= Minister for the Budget =

Minister for the Budget of Sweden
- Budgetminister
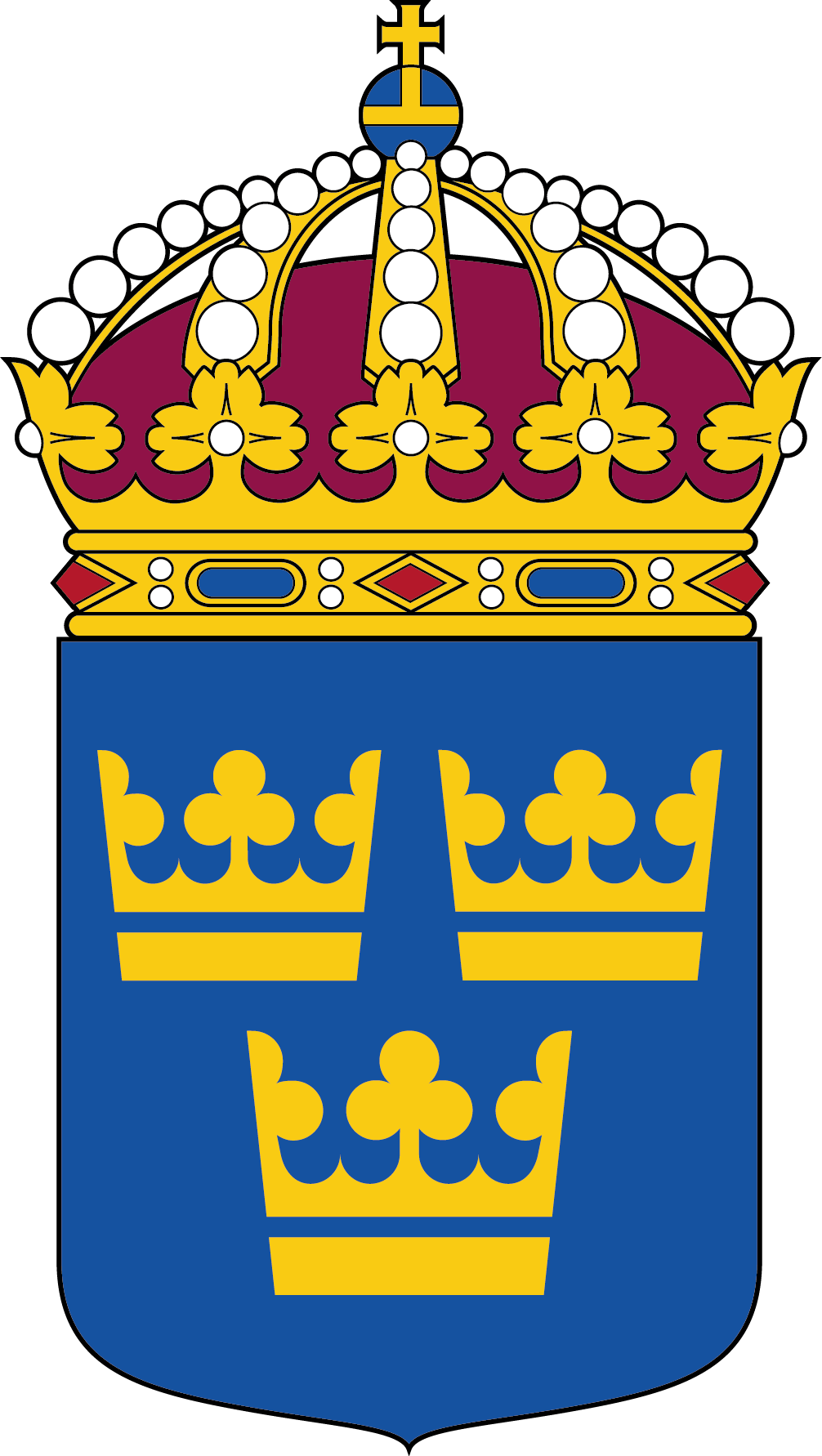
- Lesser coat of arms of Sweden
- Ministry of the Budget
- Appointer: The Prime Minister
- Term length: No fixed term Serves as long as the Prime Minister sees fit
- Formation: 25 November 1976
- First holder: Ingemar Mundebo
- Final holder: Kjell-Olof Feldt
- Abolished: 31 December 1982

The Minister for the Budget (Swedish: Budgetminister) was a member of the government of Sweden. The minister for the budget was the head of the Ministry of the Budget from 1976 to 1982 which was primarily responsible for budget regulation as well as the general administration and accounting of state funds, the state and municipal tax system. State land and buildings, alcoholic beverages, resident registration, press support and information, personnel administrative planning, personnel health care, etc. within the state's area of responsibility, administrative democracy, etc. and training of government employees.

== History ==
The post of minister for the budget was created after the 1976 general election when the Ministry of Finance was split into two; the Ministry of the Budget and the Ministry of Economics. The Ministry of the Budget would primarily work with taxes. Ingemar Mundebo of the Liberal People's Party became the first minister for the budget in Thorbjörn Fälldin's First Cabinet and he was given the task of handling taxes and salaries, while Gösta Bohman of the Moderate Party was appointed minister of economics with handling the long-term economic policy etc. The cabinet resigned on 18 October 1978 following discord in the area involving nuclear power. The cabinet was succeeded by Ola Ullsten's First Cabinet. Ingemar Mundebo became minister for the budget and minister of economics.

The cabinet resigned on 12 October 1979 following the 1979 general election to make way for a coalition majority government led by Thorbjörn Fälldin. The cabinet was succeeded by Thorbjörn Fälldin's Second Cabinet where Ingemar Mundebo again became minister for the budget. The division of duties between and minister for of budget Ingemar Mundebo and the minister of economics Gösta Bohman was the same as in the previous three-party government. In 1980, Mundebo chose to resign and at the end of June of the same year, Rolf Wirtén was appointed as minister for the budget.

The 1982 general election saw the return of the Swedish Social Democratic Party to power after six years in opposition. Kjell-Olof Feldt was appointed minister for the budget and of economics in Palme's Second Cabinet. The Ministry of Finance was re-established on 1 January 1983 and thus the Ministry of the Budget and the post of minister for the budget where abolished.

== List of officeholders ==
Color key

Independent
Historical parties: Lantmanna Moderate National Party Liberals Liberals Liberals Liberals
Present parties: Social Democrats Moderate Centre Left Liberals Christian Democrats Green Sweden Democrats

=== 1976–1982 ===
| Portrait | Minister (Born-Died) | Term | | | Political Party | Coalition | Cabinet |
| Portrait | Minister (Born-Died) | Took office | Left office | Duration | Political Party | Coalition | Cabinet |
| Ingemar Mundebo | Ingemar Mundebo (1930–2018) | 25 November 1976 | 31 July 1980 | 3 years, 249 days | Liberals | C–M–L | Fälldin I Ullsten; Fälldin II |
| Rolf Wirtén | Rolf Wirtén (1931–2023) | 1 August 1980 | 8 October 1982 | 2 years, 68 days | Liberals | C–M–L | Fälldin II; Fälldin III |
| Kjell-Olof Feldt | Kjell-Olof Feldt (1931–2025) | 8 October 1982 | 31 December 1982 | 84 days | Social Democrats | – | Palme II |
