= Fälldin II cabinet =

Government of Sweden from 1979 to 1981

Fälldin's Second Cabinet
- 44th Cabinet of Sweden

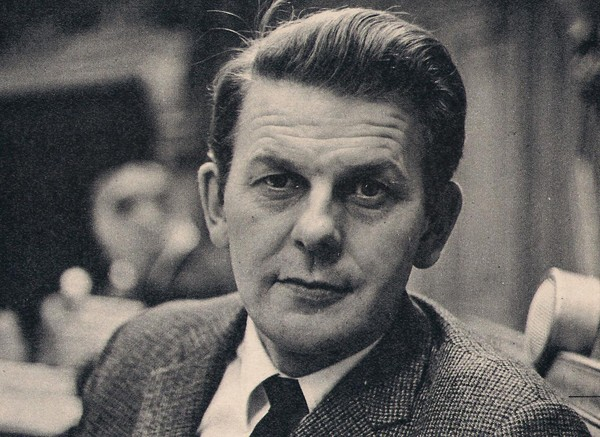
- Prime Minister Thorbjörn Fälldin
- Date formed: 12 October 1979
- Date dissolved: 22 May 1981

People and organisations
- Monarch: Carl XVI Gustaf
- Prime Minister: Thorbjörn Fälldin
- Member parties: Moderate Party; Centre Party; People's Party
- Status in legislature: Coalition majority
- Opposition parties: Social Democrats; Left Party – the Communists
- Opposition leader: Olof Palme (S)

History
- Incoming formation: 1979 election
- Outgoing formation: Withdrawal of the Moderate Party
- Election: 1979 election
- Legislature term: 1979–1982
- Predecessor: Ullsten
- Successor: Fälldin III

The Fälldin II cabinet (Swedish: regeringen Fälldin II) was the government of Sweden from 12 October 1979 to 22 May 1981. It was a coalition majority government between the Moderate Party, the Centre Party, and the People's Party, led by Prime Minister Thorbjörn Fälldin of the Centre Party. Fälldin had previously been prime minister from 1976 until he resigned in October 1978 following a vote of confidence.

The cabinet was installed following the 1979 election. It resigned when the Moderate Party withdrew from the cabinet due to the Centre Party and the People's Party having made up with the Social Democrats over taxing policy. It was succeeded by the Fälldin III cabinet.

== Ministers ==
Portfolio	Minister	Took office	Left office	Party
Prime Minister	Thorbjörn Fälldin	12 October 1979	22 May 1981	Centre
Deputy Prime Minister	Ola Ullsten	12 October 1979	22 May 1981	People's Party
Minister for Foreign Affairs	Ola Ullsten	12 October 1979	22 May 1981	People's Party
Minister of Economics	Gösta Bohman	12 October 1979	5 May 1981	Moderate
Minister of Economics	Rolf Wirtén	5 May 1981	22 May 1981	People's Party
Minister for the Budget	Ingemar Mundebo	12 October 1979	31 July 1980	People's Party
Minister for the Budget	Rolf Wirtén	31 July 1980	22 May 1981	People's Party
Minister for Education	Jan-Erik Wikström	12 October 1979	22 May 1981	People's Party
Minister for Justice	Håkan Winberg	12 October 1979	5 May 1981	Moderate
Minister for Justice	Carl Axel Petri	5 May 1981	22 May 1981	Independent
Minister for Health and Social Affairs	Karin Söder	12 October 1979	22 May 1981	Centre
Minister for Employment	Rolf Wirtén	12 October 1979	31 July 1980	People's Party
Minister for Employment	Ingemar Eliasson	31 July 1980	22 May 1981	People's Party
Minister for Agriculture	Anders Dahlgren	12 October 1979	22 May 1981	Centre
Minister for Defence	Eric Krönmark	12 October 1979	5 May 1981	Moderate
Minister for Defence	Anders Dahlgren	5 May 1981	22 May 1981	Centre
Minister for Communications	Ulf Adelsohn	12 October 1979	5 May 1981	Moderate
Minister for Communications	Olof Johansson	5 May 1981	22 May 1981	Centre
Minister for Physical Planning and Local Government	Karl Boo	12 October 1979	22 May 1981	Centre
Minister for Housing	Birgit Friggebo	12 October 1979	22 May 1981	People's Party
Minister for Enterprise	Nils G. Åsling	12 October 1979	22 May 1981	Centre
Minister of Commerce and Industry	Staffan Burenstam Linder	12 October 1979	5 May 1981	Moderate
Minister of Commerce and Industry	Jan-Erik Wikström	5 May 1981	22 May 1981	People's Party
Ministers without portfolio
Health Care	Elisabet Holm	12 October 1979	5 May 1981	Moderate
Staff	Olof Johansson	12 October 1979	22 May 1981	Centre
Minister for Schools	Britt Mogård	12 October 1979	5 May 1981	Moderate
Migration and Equality	Karin Andersson	12 October 1979	22 May 1981	Centre
Planning	Georg Danell	12 October 1979	5 May 1981	Moderate
Energy and Criminals	Carl Axel Petri	6 November 1979	22 May 1981	Independent

Preceded by Ullsten cabinet	Cabinet of Sweden; 1979–1981	Succeeded by Fälldin III cabinet
