= Minister of Economics (Sweden) =

Swedish cabinet member, 1976–1982

Minister of Economics of Sweden
- Ekonomiminister
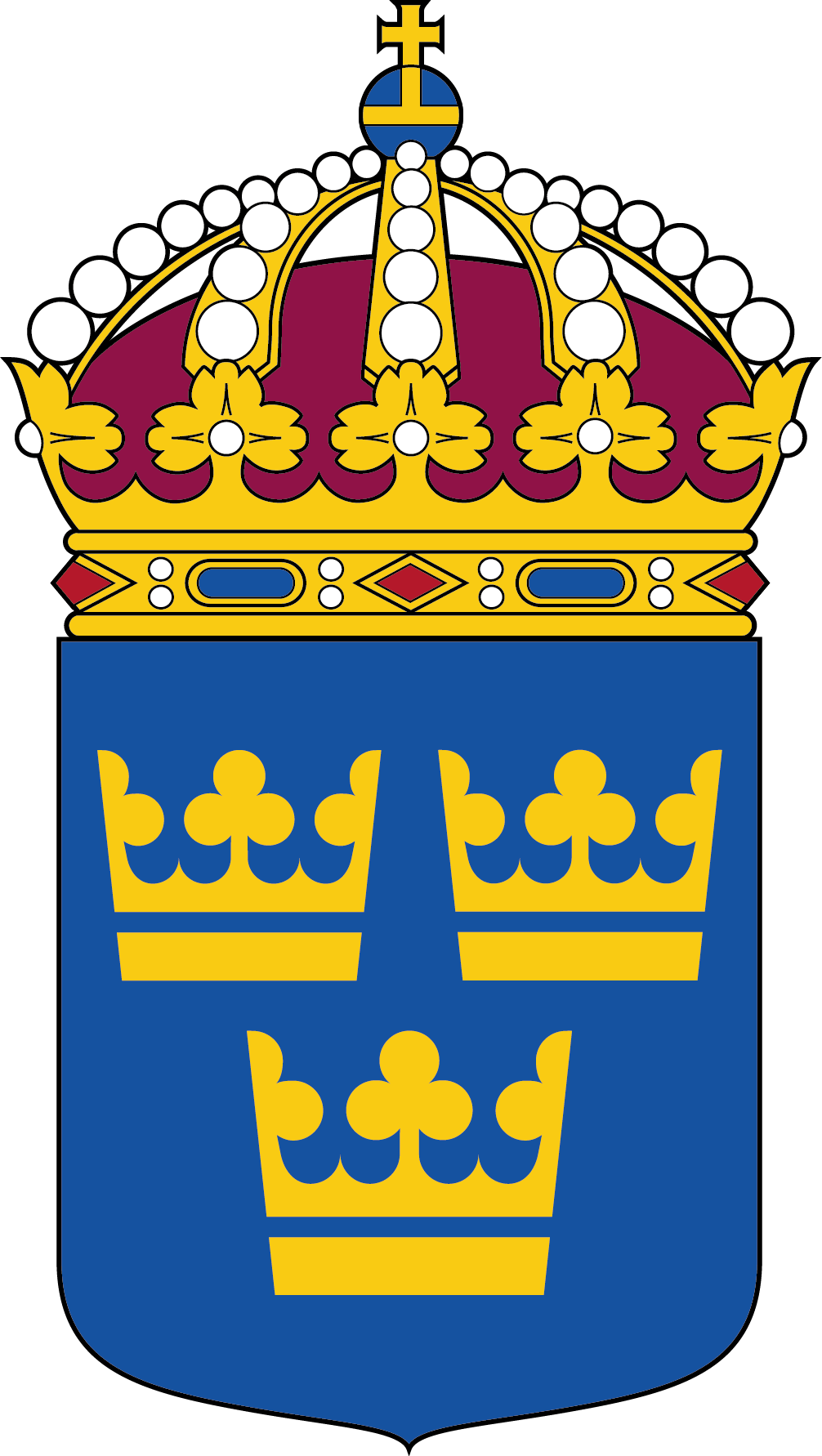
- Lesser coat of arms of Sweden
- Ministry of Economics
- Appointer: The Prime Minister
- Term length: No fixed term Serves as long as the Prime Minister sees fit
- Formation: 1976
- First holder: Gösta Bohman
- Final holder: Kjell-Olof Feldt
- Abolished: 31 December 1982

The Minister of Economics (Swedish: Ekonomiminister) was a member of the government of Sweden. The minister of economics was the head of the Ministry of Economics from 1976 to 1982 which dealt with long-term guidelines for economic policy, the principle orientation of financial and credit policy, international economic cooperation, statistics, questions regarding banking and insurance, the stock exchange and the monetary system.

== History ==
The post of minister of economics was created after the 1976 general election when the Ministry of Finance was split into two; The Ministry of Economics and the Ministry of the Budget. The Ministry of Economics would primarily work with general guidelines for economic policy and the principled direction of fiscal and credit policy measures. Gösta Bohman of the Moderate Party became the first minister of economics in Thorbjörn Fälldin's First Cabinet and he was given the task of handling the long-term economic policy, while Ingemar Mundebo of the Liberal People's Party was appointed minister for the budget with handling taxes and salaries etc. The cabinet resigned on 18 October 1978 following discord in the area involving nuclear power. The cabinet was succeeded by Ola Ullsten's First Cabinet. Ingemar Mundebo became minister of economics and minister for the budget.

The cabinet resigned on 12 October 1979 following the 1979 general election to make way for a coalition majority government led by Thorbjörn Fälldin. The cabinet was succeeded by Thorbjörn Fälldin's Second Cabinet where Gösta Bohman again became minister of economics. The division of duties between minister of economics Gösta Bohman and minister for the budget Ingemar Mundebo was the same as in the previous three-party government. Bohman resigned in May 1981 and was succeeded by the liberal Rolf Wirtén as minister of economics and for the budget in Thorbjörn Fälldin's Third Cabinet. The 1982 general election saw the return of the Swedish Social Democratic Party to power after six years in opposition. Kjell-Olof Feldt was appointed minister of economics and for the budget in Palme's Second Cabinet. The Ministry of Finance was re-established on 1 January 1983 and thus the Ministry of Economics and the post of minister of economics were abolished.

== List of officeholders ==
Color key

Independent
Historical parties: Lantmanna Moderate National Party Liberals Liberals Liberals Liberals
Present parties: Social Democrats Moderate Centre Left Liberals Christian Democrats Green Sweden Democrats

=== 1976–1982 ===
| Portrait | Minister (Born-Died) | Term | | | Political Party | Coalition | Cabinet |
| Portrait | Minister (Born-Died) | Took office | Left office | Duration | Political Party | Coalition | Cabinet |
| Gösta Bohman | Gösta Bohman (1911–1997) | 25 November 1976 | 18 October 1978 | 1 year, 327 days | Moderate | C–M–L | Fälldin I |
| Ingemar Mundebo | Ingemar Mundebo (1930–2018) | 18 October 1978 | 12 October 1979 | 359 days | Liberals | – | Ullsten Cabinet |
| Gösta Bohman | Gösta Bohman (1911–1997) | 12 October 1979 | 5 May 1981 | 1 year, 205 days | Moderate | C–M–L | Fälldin II |
| Rolf Wirtén | Rolf Wirtén (1931–2023) | 5 May 1981 | 8 October 1982 | 1 year, 156 days | Liberals | C–M–L | Fälldin II; Fälldin III |
| Kjell-Olof Feldt | Kjell-Olof Feldt (born 1931) | 8 October 1982 | 31 December 1982 | 84 days | Social Democrats | – | Palme II |
