= Fälldin I cabinet =

Cabinet and Government of Sweden from 1976 to 1978

Fälldin's First Cabinet
- 42nd Cabinet of Sweden

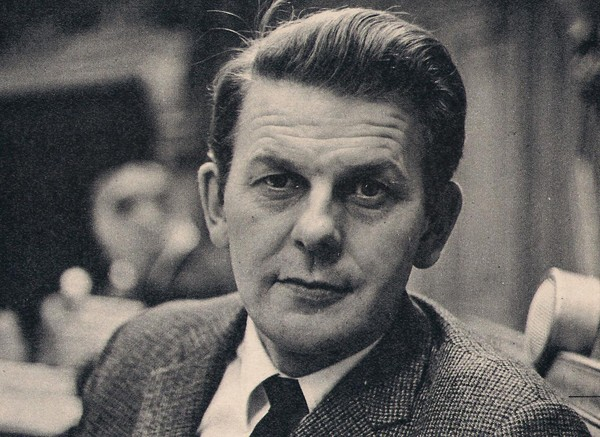
- Prime Minister Thorbjörn Fälldin
- Date formed: 8 October 1976
- Date dissolved: 18 October 1978

People and organisations
- Monarch: Carl XVI Gustaf
- Prime Minister: Thorbjörn Fälldin
- Member parties: Centre Party; Moderate Party; People's Party
- Status in legislature: Coalition majority
- Opposition parties: Social Democrats; Left Party – the Communists
- Opposition leader: Olof Palme (S)

History
- Incoming formation: 1976 election
- Outgoing formation: Nuclear power discord
- Election: 1976 election
- Legislature term: 1976–1979
- Predecessor: Palme I
- Successor: Ullsten

The Fälldin I cabinet (Swedish: regeringen Fälldin I) was the government of Sweden from 8 October 1976 to 18 October 1978. It was a coalition majority government between the Centre Party, the Moderate Party, and the People's Party, led by Prime Minister Thorbjörn Fälldin of the Centre Party. It was the first non-Social Democratic led cabinet in Sweden in 40 years, after the cabinet of Axel Pehrsson in 1936.

The cabinet was installed following the 1976 general election and resigned due to disagreements over nuclear power policy. It was succeeded by the People's Party single-party Ullsten cabinet.

== Ministers ==
Portfolio	Minister	Took office	Left office	Party
Prime Minister	Thorbjörn Fälldin	8 October 1976	18 October 1978	Centre
Deputy Prime Minister	Per Ahlmark	8 October 1976	7 March 1978	People's Party
Deputy Prime Minister	Ola Ullsten	7 March 1978	18 October 1978	People's Party
Minister for Foreign Affairs	Karin Söder	8 October 1976	18 October 1978	Centre
Minister of Economics	Gösta Bohman	8 October 1976	18 October 1978	Moderate
Minister for the Budget	Ingemar Mundebo	8 October 1976	18 October 1978	People's Party
Minister for Education	Jan-Erik Wikström	8 October 1976	18 October 1978	People's Party
Minister for Justice	Sven Romanus	8 October 1976	18 October 1978	Independent
Minister for Health and Social Affairs	Rune Gustavsson	8 October 1976	18 October 1978	Centre
Minister for Employment	Per Ahlmark	8 October 1976	7 March 1978	People's Party
Minister for Employment	Rolf Wirtén	7 March 1978	18 October 1978	People's Party
Minister for Agriculture	Anders Dahlgren	8 October 1976	18 October 1978	Centre
Minister for Defence	Eric Krönmark	8 October 1976	18 October 1978	Moderate
Minister of Communications	Bo Turesson	8 October 1976	18 October 1978	Moderate
Minister for Physical Planning and Local Government	Johannes Antonsson	8 October 1976	18 October 1978	Centre
Minister for Housing	Elvy Olsson	8 October 1976	18 October 1978	Centre
Minister for Enterprise	Nils G. Åsling	8 October 1976	18 October 1978	Centre
Minister of Commerce and Industry	Staffan Burenstam Linder	8 October 1976	18 October 1978	Moderate
Ministers without portfolio
Migration	Ola Ullsten	8 October 1976	18 October 1978	People's Party
Health Care	Ingegerd Troedsson	8 October 1976	18 October 1978	Moderate
Minister for Schools	Britt Mogård	8 October 1976	18 October 1978	Moderate
Energy	Olof Johansson	8 October 1976	18 October 1978	Centre

Preceded by Palme I cabinet	Cabinet of Sweden; 1976–1978	Succeeded by Ullsten cabinet
