= Fälldin III cabinet =

Government of Sweden from 1981 to 1982

Fälldin's Third Cabinet
- 45th Cabinet of Sweden

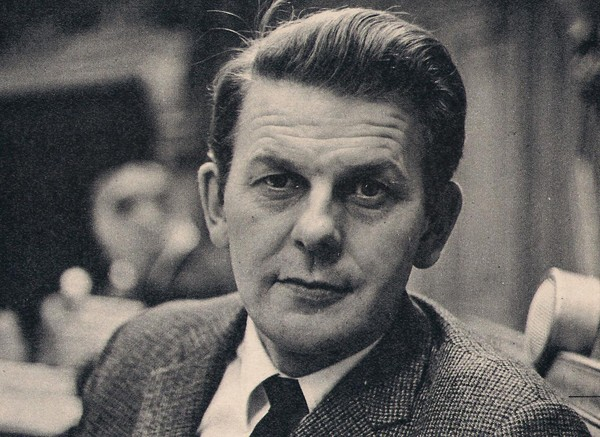
- Prime Minister Thorbjörn Fälldin
- Date formed: 22 May 1981
- Date dissolved: 8 October 1982

People and organisations
- Monarch: Carl XVI Gustaf
- Prime Minister: Thorbjörn Fälldin
- Member parties: Centre Party; People's Party
- Status in legislature: Coalition minority with flexible support from Moderate Party
- Opposition parties: Social Democrats; Left Party – the Communists
- Opposition leader: Olof Palme (S)

History
- Incoming formation: Withdrawal of the Moderate Party
- Outgoing formation: 1982 election
- Election: 1982 election
- Legislature term: 1979–1982
- Predecessor: Fälldin II
- Successor: Palme II

The Fälldin III cabinet (Swedish: regeringen Fälldin III) was the government of Sweden from 22 May 1981 to 8 October 1982. It was a coalition minority government between the Centre Party and the People's Party, led by Prime Minister Thorbjörn Fälldin of the Centre Party.

The cabinet was installed after the Moderate Party had withdrawn from the previous Fälldin II cabinet due to the Centre Party and the People's Party having made up with the Social Democrats over taxing policy. It resigned following a defeat in the 1982 general election and was succeeded by the Social Democratic Palme II cabinet.

== Ministers ==
Portfolio	Minister	Took office	Left office	Party
Prime Minister	Thorbjörn Fälldin	22 May 1981	8 October 1982	Centre
Deputy Prime Minister	Ola Ullsten	22 May 1981	8 October 1982	People's Party
Minister for Foreign Affairs	Ola Ullsten	22 May 1981	8 October 1982	People's Party
Minister of Economics/Budget	Rolf Wirtén	22 May 1981	8 October 1982	People's Party
Minister for Education	Jan-Erik Wikström	22 May 1981	8 October 1982	People's Party
Minister for Justice	Carl Axel Petri	22 May 1981	8 October 1982	Independent
Minister for Health and Social Affairs	Karin Söder	22 May 1981	8 October 1982	Centre
Minister for Employment	Ingemar Eliasson	22 May 1981	8 October 1982	People's Party
Minister for Agriculture	Anders Dahlgren	22 May 1981	4 October 1982	Centre
Minister for Agriculture	Olof Johansson	4 October 1982	8 October 1982	Centre
Minister for Defence	Torsten Gustafsson	22 May 1981	8 October 1982	Centre
Minister for Communications	Claes Elmstedt	22 May 1981	8 October 1982	Centre
Minister for Physical Planning and Local Government	Karl Boo	22 May 1981	8 October 1982	Centre
Minister for Housing	Birgit Friggebo	22 May 1981	8 October 1982	People's Party
Minister for Enterprise	Nils G. Åsling	22 May 1981	8 October 1982	Centre
Minister of Commerce and Industry	Björn Molin	22 May 1981	8 October 1982	People's Party
Ministers without portfolio
Health Care	Karin Ahrland	22 May 1981	8 October 1982	People's Party
Staff	Olof Johansson	22 May 1981	8 October 1982	Centre
Minister for Schools	Ulla Tillander	22 May 1981	8 October 1982	Centre
Migration and Equality	Karin Andersson	22 May 1981	8 October 1982	Centre

Preceded by Fälldin II cabinet	Cabinet of Sweden; 1981–1982	Succeeded by Palme II cabinet
