= Minister of Budget =

Minister of Budget may refer to:

- Minister of Budget (Belgium)
- Minister of Budget (Italy)
- Minister for the Budget (Sweden)
