= Ministry of Economics (Sweden) =

Swedish government ministry (1976–1982)

- Ekonomidepartementet

Economics ministry overview
- Formed: 25 November 1976
- Dissolved: 31 December 1982
- Superseding Economics ministry: Ministry of Finance
- Headquarters: Stockholm, Sweden
- Minister responsible: Minister of Economics
- Parent agency: Government Offices

The Ministry of Economics (Swedish: Ekonomidepartementet) was a ministry in Sweden established in 1976. The ministry dealt with long-term guidelines for economic policy, the principle orientation of financial and credit policy, international economic cooperation, statistics, questions regarding banking and insurance, the stock exchange and the monetary system. The ministry was headed by the minister of economics. The ministry ceased to exist in 1982.

== History ==
The ministry was established after the 1976 Swedish general election when the Ministry of Finance was divided into the Ministry of Economics and the Ministry of the Budget. The division officially took place on 25 November 1976 following a government decision on 11 November. Most of the old Ministry of Finance's approximately 9,000 cases a year were taken care of by the Ministry of the Budget, e.g. the taxes, the budget and salary issues. The Ministry of Economics would primarily work with general guidelines for economic policy and the principled direction of fiscal and credit policy measures. The ministry had to take over the AP fund (AP-fonden) and the other credit and fund systems as well as the monetary system, statistics and international economic cooperation. It would also handle the application of the Share Funds Act (Aktiefondslagen), the Act on Simplified Share Handling (Lagen om förenklad aktiehantering) and the Act on Registration of Shareholdings (Lagen om registrering av aktieinnehav). The ministry would also propose changes to the law for currency regulation. The Ministry of Economics took over the following companies from the Ministry of Finance: Företagskapital AB, Företagskredit AB, AB Industrikredit, Lantbruksnärningarnas sekundarkredit AB, PK-Banken and Värdepapperscentralen VPC AB.

The ministry was headed by the minister of economics. In addition, there was a state secretary, a director general for administrative affairs/legal affairs (expeditionschef/rättschef), a head of planning, a coordination office and a number of units: the Long-term Unit (Långsiktsenheten), the Short-term Unit (Kortsiktsenheten), the International Unit (Internationella enheten) and the Unit for Fiscal Policy (Enheten för finanspolitik). In 1981, the Working Group for Administrative Matters, Budget Matters, etc. (Arbetsgruppen för administrativa frågor, budgetärenden m. m.) and the Banking and Insurance Unit (Bank- och försäkringsenheten) were added. Other officials were a deputy director (kansliråd), a number of desk officers (departementssekreterare), division heads (byrådirektör), department directors, information secretaries, registrars and officials with special assignments.

The ministry was abolished after the 1982 Swedish general election and the Ministry of Finance was re-established by Palme's Second Cabinet on 1 January 1983.

== Central boards and agencies ==
The following central administrative boards and agencies belonged to the Ministry of Economics: the Royal Swedish Mint (Myntverket), Statistics Sweden, the Index Board (Indexnämnden), the Bank Inspection Board (Bankinspektionen), the National Swedish Private Insurance Inspectorate (Försäkringsinspektionen), the National Institute of Economic Research, the Economic Planning Council (Ekonomiska planeringsrådet) and the Utredningsrådet. Later the Scientific Council of the Statistics Sweden (Statistiska centralbyråns vetenskapliga råd) was added. The following also belonged to the ministry: Stockholm Stock Exchange, the National Swedish Board on Reparations [for War Damages] (Statens krigsskadenämnd) and the National Swedish War Risks Insurance Office (Statens krigsförsäkringsnämnd).

== See also ==
- Minister of Economics
