= Ullsten cabinet =

Government of Sweden from 1978 to 1979

- 43rd Cabinet of Sweden

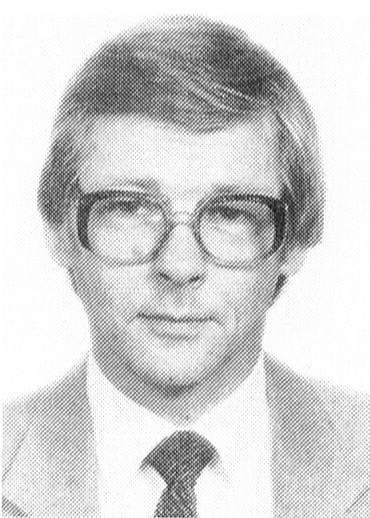
- Prime Minister Ola Ullsten
- Date formed: 18 October 1978
- Date dissolved: 12 October 1979

People and organisations
- Monarch: Carl XVI Gustaf
- Prime Minister: Ola Ullsten
- Member party: People's Party
- Status in legislature: Single-party minority with flexible support from Social Democrats and Centre Party
- Opposition parties: Moderate Party; Left Party – the Communists
- Opposition leader: Olof Palme (S)

History
- Incoming formation: Nuclear power discord
- Outgoing formation: 1979 election
- Election: 1979 election
- Legislature term: 1976–1979
- Predecessor: Fälldin I
- Successor: Fälldin II

The Ullsten cabinet (Swedish: regeringen Ullsten) was the government of Sweden from 18 October 1978 to 12 October 1979. It was a People's Party single-party minority government led by Prime Minister Ola Ullsten. It was the first People's Party led cabinet in Sweden since the cabinet of Felix Hamrin in 1932 and is the last time the party held the office of Prime Minister (as of October 2026).

The previous coalition Fälldin I cabinet resigned due to disagreements over nuclear power policy. Ullsten was then asked to form a minority government by the Speaker of the Riksdag after several failed attempts to form an active/inactive majority cabinet. The cabinet resigned following the 1979 general election to make way for the coalition majority Fälldin II cabinet.

== Ministers ==
Portfolio	Minister	Took office	Left office	Party
Prime Minister	Ola Ullsten	18 October 1978	12 October 1979	People's Party
Deputy Prime Minister	Sven Romanus	18 October 1978	12 October 1979	Independent
Minister for Foreign Affairs	Hans Blix	18 October 1978	12 October 1979	People's Party
Minister of Economics/Minister for the Budget	Ingemar Mundebo	18 October 1978	12 October 1979	People's Party
Minister for Education	Jan-Erik Wikström	18 October 1978	12 October 1979	People's Party
Minister for Justice	Sven Romanus	18 October 1978	12 October 1979	Independent
Minister for Health and Social Affairs	Gabriel Romanus	18 October 1978	12 October 1979	People's Party
Minister for Employment	Rolf Wirtén	18 October 1978	12 October 1979	People's Party
Minister for Agriculture	Eric Enlund	18 October 1978	12 October 1979	People's Party
Minister for Defence	Lars De Geer	18 October 1978	12 October 1979	People's Party
Minister for Communications	Anitha Bondestam	18 October 1978	12 October 1979	People's Party
Minister for Physical Planning and Local Government	Bertil Hansson	18 October 1978	12 October 1979	People's Party
Minister for Housing	Birgit Friggebo	18 October 1978	12 October 1979	People's Party
Minister for Enterprise	Erik Huss	18 October 1978	12 October 1979	People's Party
Minister of Commerce and Industry	Hadar Cars	18 October 1978	12 October 1979	People's Party
Minister for Migration and Gender Equality	Eva Winther	18 October 1978	12 October 1979	People's Party
Minister for Energy	Carl Tham	18 October 1978	12 October 1979	People's Party
Minister for Schools	Birgit Rodhe	18 October 1978	12 October 1979	People's Party

== Policy ==
=== Nuclear power policy ===
The Swedish nuclear energy program had been enacted by the Riksdag in 1975 which entailed an expansion to 13 nuclear power plants in total by 1985. The Riksdag had also decided that energy policy was to be re-evaluated in three years and that the safety of nuclear power was to be investigated. The previous Fälldin I cabinet had instated a committee with the task of evaluating nuclear safety. Minister for Energy Carl Tham was working on drafting a government bill regarding energy policy, with Social Democrats' Ingvar Carlsson and Birgitta Dahl following his work closely. Both the Social Democratic and Moderate parties held positive views regarding nuclear power and it was assumed that the government would not have any difficulties passing the bill.

However, everything changed following the Three Mile Island accident. While Olof Palme, the Social Democratic leader, had criticized the Fälldin I cabinet for unnecessarily delaying the expansion of nuclear power in the past, Palme and his party did a complete turn-around on the issue, demanding a popular referendum to decide the future of nuclear power on 4 April 1979. During the remainder of the spring, the parties discussed how a popular referendum was to be performed and what choices voters would have. Eventually, it was decided that voters would be able to pick three choices, all of which revolved around abolishing nuclear power at various rates (see 1980 Swedish nuclear power referendum).

=== Economic policy ===
Ingemar Mundebo, serving as Minister for the Economy and the Budget, led efforts to draft a proposal aimed at reducing the marginal tax rate and implementing an upper tax limit. The government anticipated the proposal would succeed with backing from the Centre Party and Moderates. However, in the spring of 1979, the Centre Party opposed the bill due to concerns over financial inconsistencies in its funding. As a result, the legislation failed to pass.

=== Foreign policy ===
In December 1978 it was revealed that while Sweden was supporting the East Timor independence movement, the government was simultaneously allowing the export of arms to the occupying Indonesian forces. The Minister of Commerce and Industry Hadar Cars stated that this was completely allowed.

=== Other ===
The government also managed to pass several reforms, such as increased parental insurance, corporate tax reforms, and a new education plan (Lgr80). Child corporal punishment was legally abolished during the reign of the Ullsten cabinet.

Preceded by Fälldin I cabinet	Cabinet of Sweden; 1978–1979	Succeeded by Fälldin II cabinet
