= Bondestam =

Bondestam is a surname. Notable people with the surname include:

- Anitha Bondestam (born 1941), German-born Swedish jurist
- Linda Bondestam (born 1977), Finnish illustrator and children's writer
