= Anitha Bondestam =

Swedish jurist and politician (born 1941)

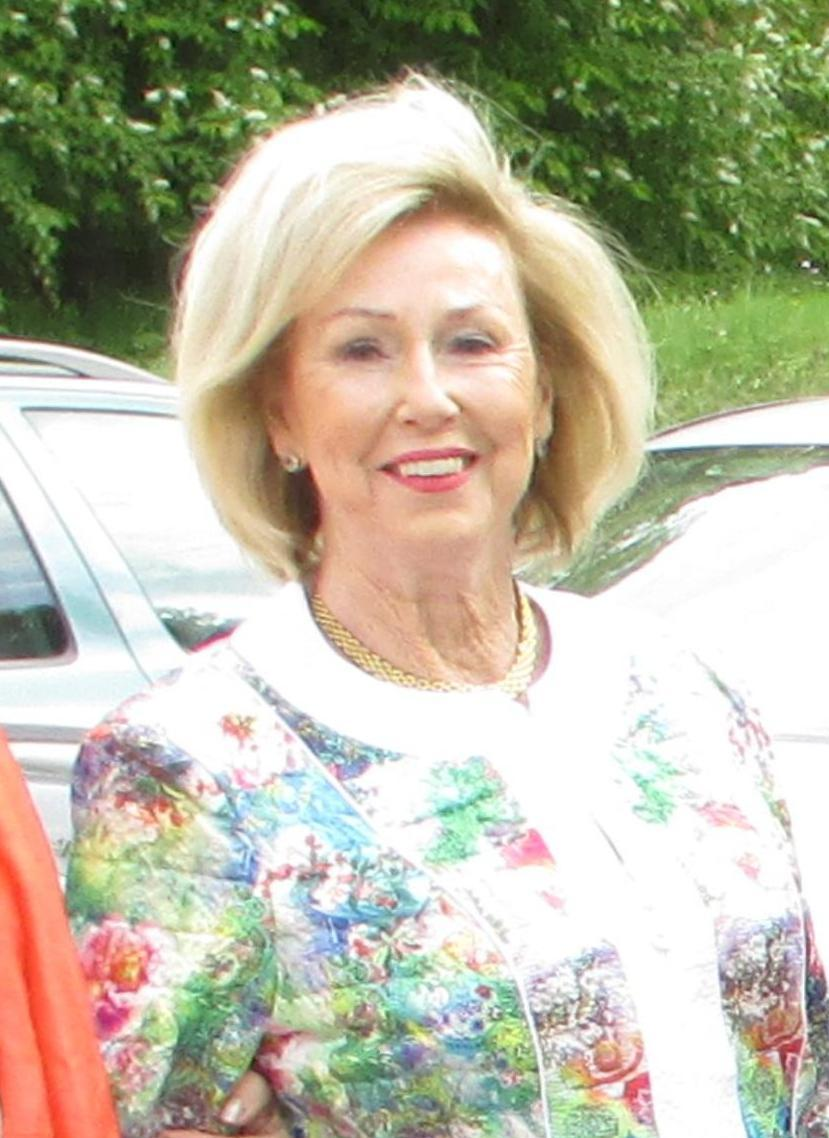
- Anitha Bondestam in 2016

Minister of Communications (Transport)
- In office 1978–1979
- Prime Minister: Ola Ullsten

Personal details
- Born: 1941 (age 84–85) Danzig, Germany
- Party: Liberal People's party
- Education: Uppsala University
- Occupation: Jurist

Anitha Bondestam (born 1941) is a German-born Swedish jurist who served as the minister of communications (Transport) in the Ullsten Cabinet in the period 1978–1979. She also held several official positions.

== Biography ==
Bondestam was born in Danzig, Germany in 1941. However, in a study by Hanna Bäck et al. (2008) it is stated that she was born in Poland.

She received a bachelor's degree in law from Uppsala University.

Bondestam started her career as a jurist at the district courts in 1964 and worked at different courts until 1974. She was a legal advisor for the ministry of commerce from 1972 to 1973 and for the ministry of justice between 1974 and 1977. She was head of operations at the ministry of communications in 1977. She served as the minister of communications (Transport) from 1978 to 1979. She was chairman of the gender equality board for two terms.

After leaving politics Bondestam served as the justice administrator of the court of appeal in Gothenburg between 1980 and 1992. Then she held other positions at the legal system.
