= Palme II cabinet =

Government of Sweden from 1982 to 1986

Palme's Second Cabinet
- 46th Cabinet of Sweden

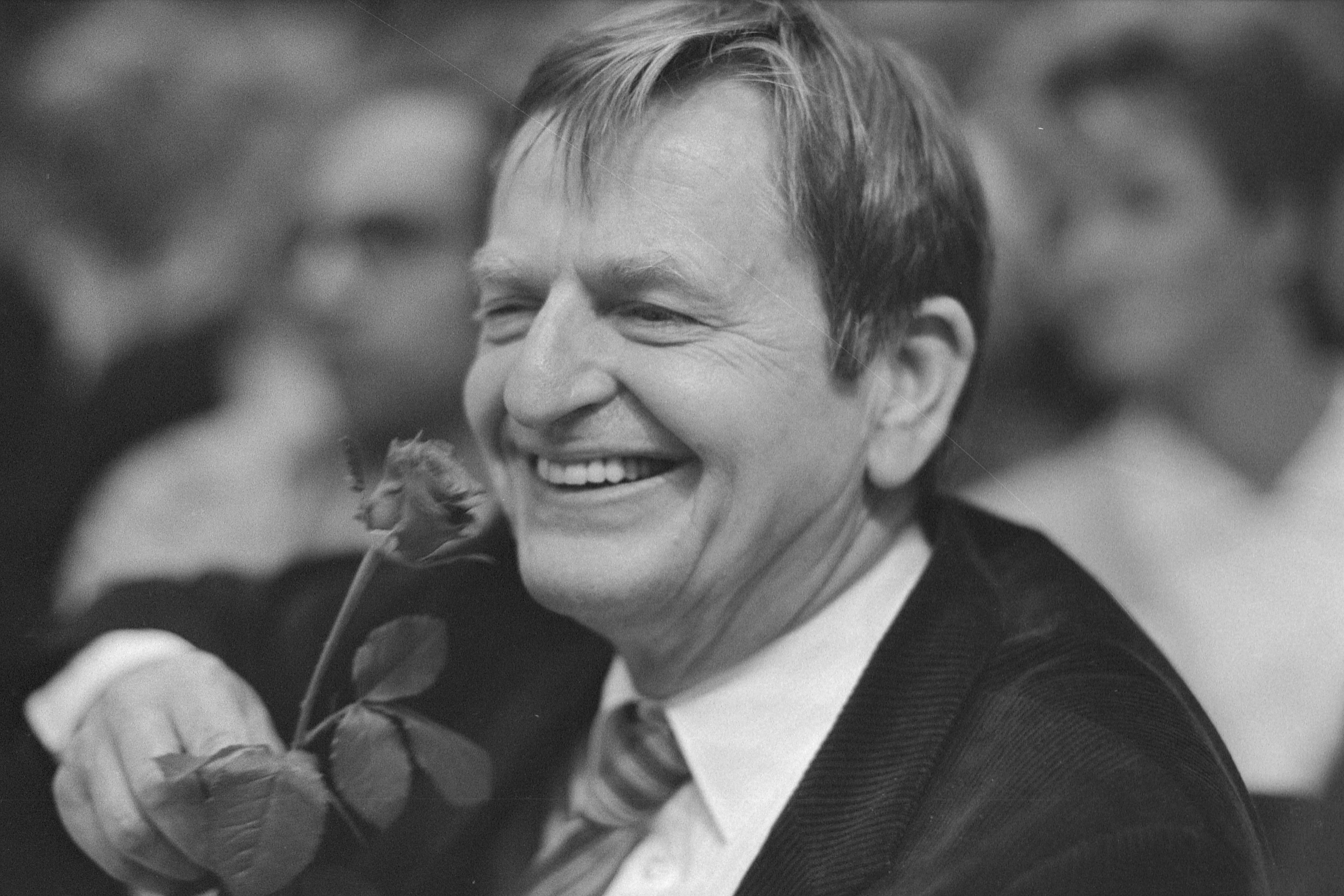
- Prime Minister Olof Palme
- Date formed: 8 October 1982
- Date dissolved: 12 March 1986

People and organisations
- Monarch: Carl XVI Gustaf
- Prime Minister: Olof Palme
- Member party: Social Democrats
- Status in legislature: Single-party minority with flexible support from Left Party – the Communists
- Opposition parties: Moderate Party; Centre Party; People's Party
- Opposition leader: Ulf Adelsohn (M)

History
- Incoming formation: 1982 election
- Outgoing formation: Assassination of Olof Palme
- Elections: 1982 election 1985 election
- Legislature terms: 1982–1985; 1985–1988
- Predecessor: Fälldin III
- Successor: Carlsson I

The Palme II cabinet (Swedish: regeringen Palme II) was the government of Sweden from 8 October 1982 to 12 March 1986. It was a Social Democratic single-party minority government led by Prime Minister Olof Palme, until his assassination on 28 February 1986. Palme had previously been prime minister from 1969 until his defeat in the 1976 general election.

The cabinet was installed following the 1982 general election. On 1 March 1986, the cabinet was dismissed because of Palme's passing, but it stayed in office as a caretaker government until 12 March led by Deputy Prime Minister Ingvar Carlsson. It was replaced by the likewise Social Democratic Carlsson I cabinet.

== Ministers ==
Portfolio	Minister	Took office	Left office	Party
Prime Minister	Olof Palme	8 October 1982	28 February 1986	Social Democrats
Deputy Prime Minister	Ingvar Carlsson	8 October 1982	12 March 1986	Social Democrats
Minister for Foreign Affairs	Lennart Bodström	8 October 1982	17 October 1985	Social Democrats
Minister for Foreign Affairs	Sten Andersson	17 October 1985	12 March 1986	Social Democrats
Minister of Economics; Minister for the Budget; Minister for Finance	Kjell-Olof Feldt	8 October 1982	12 March 1986	Social Democrats
Minister for Education	Lena Hjelm-Wallén	8 October 1982	17 October 1985	Social Democrats
Minister for Education	Lennart Bodström	17 October 1985	12 March 1986	Social Democrats
Minister for Justice	Ove Rainer	8 October 1982	10 November 1983	Social Democrats
Minister for Justice	Sten Wickbom	15 November 1983	12 March 1986	Social Democrats
Minister for Health and Social Affairs	Sten Andersson	8 October 1982	17 October 1995	Social Democrats
Minister for Health and Social Affairs	Gertrud Sigurdsen	17 October 1985	12 March 1986	Social Democrats
Minister for Employment	Anna-Greta Leijon	8 October 1982	12 March 1986	Social Democrats
Minister for Agriculture	Svante Lundkvist	8 October 1982	12 March 1986	Social Democrats
Minister for Defence	Börje Andersson	8 October 1982	1 December 1982	Social Democrats
Minister for Defence	Curt Boström	1 December 1982	17 January 1983	Social Democrats
Minister for Defence	Anders Thunborg	17 January 1983	14 October 1985	Social Democrats
Minister for Defence	Roine Carlsson	14 October 1985	12 March 1986	Social Democrats
Minister for Communications	Curt Boström	8 October 1982	30 June 1985	Social Democrats
Minister for Communications	Sven Hulterström	30 June 1985	12 March 1986	Social Democrats
Minister for Physical Planning and Local Government; Minister for Civil Service Affairs	Bo Holmberg	8 October 1982	12 March 1986	Social Democrats
Minister for Housing	Hans Gustafsson	8 October 1982	12 March 1986	Social Democrats
Minister for the Environment	Ingvar Carlsson	17 October 1982	12 March 1986	Social Democrats
Minister for Enterprise	Thage G. Peterson	8 October 1982	12 March 1986	Social Democrats
Ministers without portfolio
Energy	Birgitta Dahl	8 October 1982	12 March 1986	Social Democrats
Minister for Schools	Bengt Göransson	8 October 1982	12 March 1986	Social Democrats
Foreign Trade	Mats Hellström	8 October 1982	12 March 1986	Social Democrats
Salaries and Consumer	Bengt K Å Johansson	17 October 1985	12 March 1996	Social Democrats
International Development Cooperation	Lena Hjelm-Wallén	17 October 1985	12 March 1986	Social Democrats
Migration	Anita Gradin	8 October 1982	12 March 1986	Social Democrats

Preceded by Fälldin III cabinet	Cabinet of Sweden; 1982–1986	Succeeded by Carlsson I cabinet
