= Thorbjörn Fälldin =

Prime minister of Sweden from 1976 to 1978 and 1979 to 1982

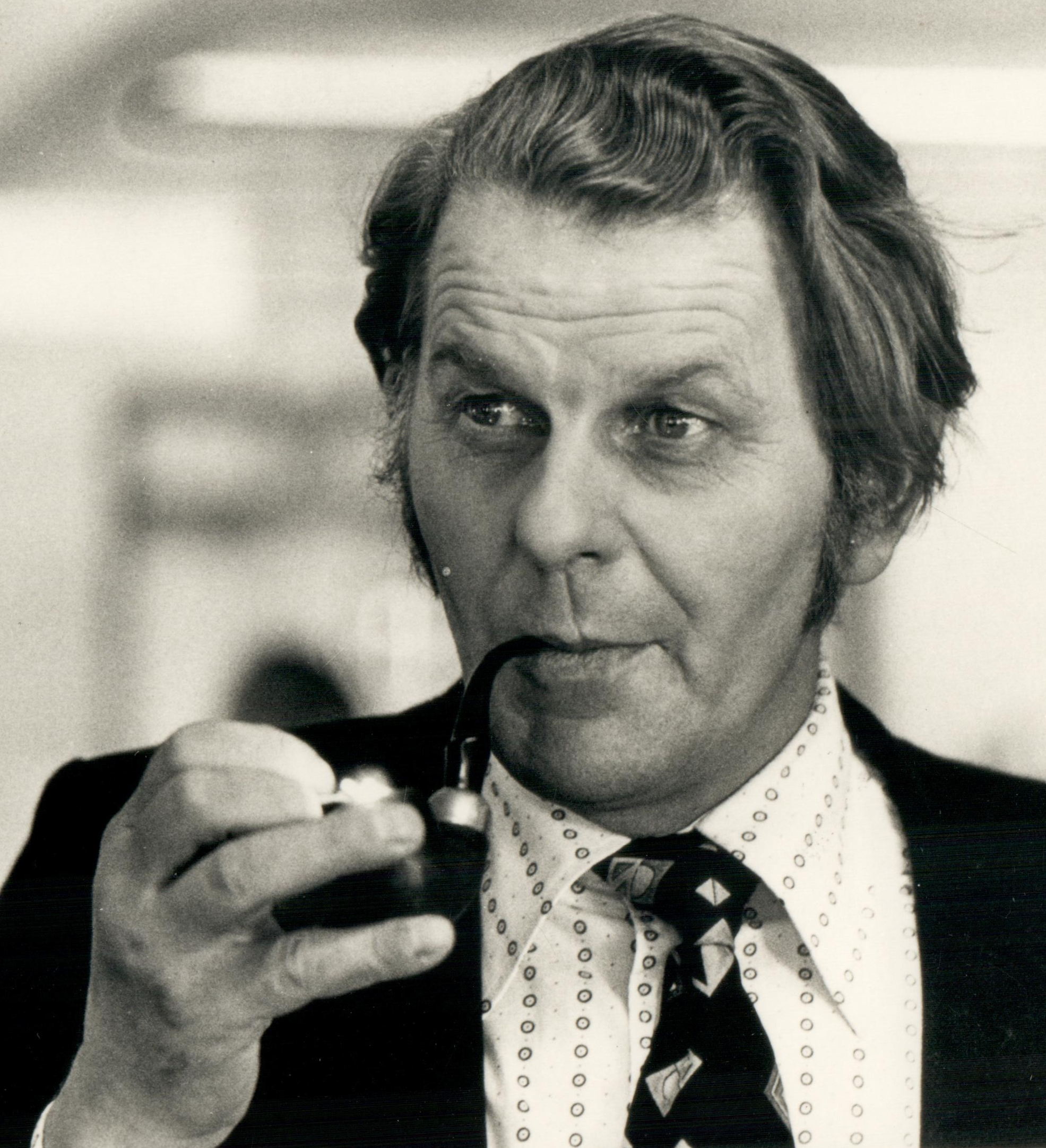
- Fälldin smoking his signature pipe

Prime Minister of Sweden
- In office 12 October 1979 – 8 October 1982
- Monarch: Carl XVI Gustaf
- Deputy: Ingemar Mundebo; Ola Ullsten
- Preceded by: Ola Ullsten
- Succeeded by: Olof Palme
- In office 8 October 1976 – 18 October 1978
- Monarch: Carl XVI Gustaf
- Deputy: Per Ahlmark; Ingemar Mundebo
- Preceded by: Olof Palme
- Succeeded by: Ola Ullsten

Leader of the Centre Party
- In office 21 June 1971 – 5 December 1985
- Preceded by: Gunnar Hedlund
- Succeeded by: Karin Söder (Acting)

Member of the Riksdag
- In office 1 January 1971 – 5 December 1985
- Constituency: Västernorrland County

Member of the Second Chamber
- In office 1958–1971
- Constituency: Västernorrland County

Personal details
- Born: Nils Olof Thorbjörn Fälldin; 24 April 1926 Högsjö, Sweden
- Died: 23 July 2016 (aged 90) Ås, Sweden
- Party: Centre
- Spouse: Solveig Fälldin (m. 1956)
- Cabinet: I; II; III

Nils Olof Thorbjörn Fälldin (24 April 1926 – 23 July 2016) was a Swedish politician and farmer who served as Prime Minister of Sweden from 1976 to 1978 and again from 1979 to 1982. From 1971 to 1985, he was leader of the Centre Party.

Upon first taking office in 1976, he was the first non-Social Democratic prime minister in 40 years, and the first since the 1930s not having worked as a professional politician since his teens. He was also the last Swedish prime minister to not be from the Social Democrats or Moderate Party.

== Early life ==
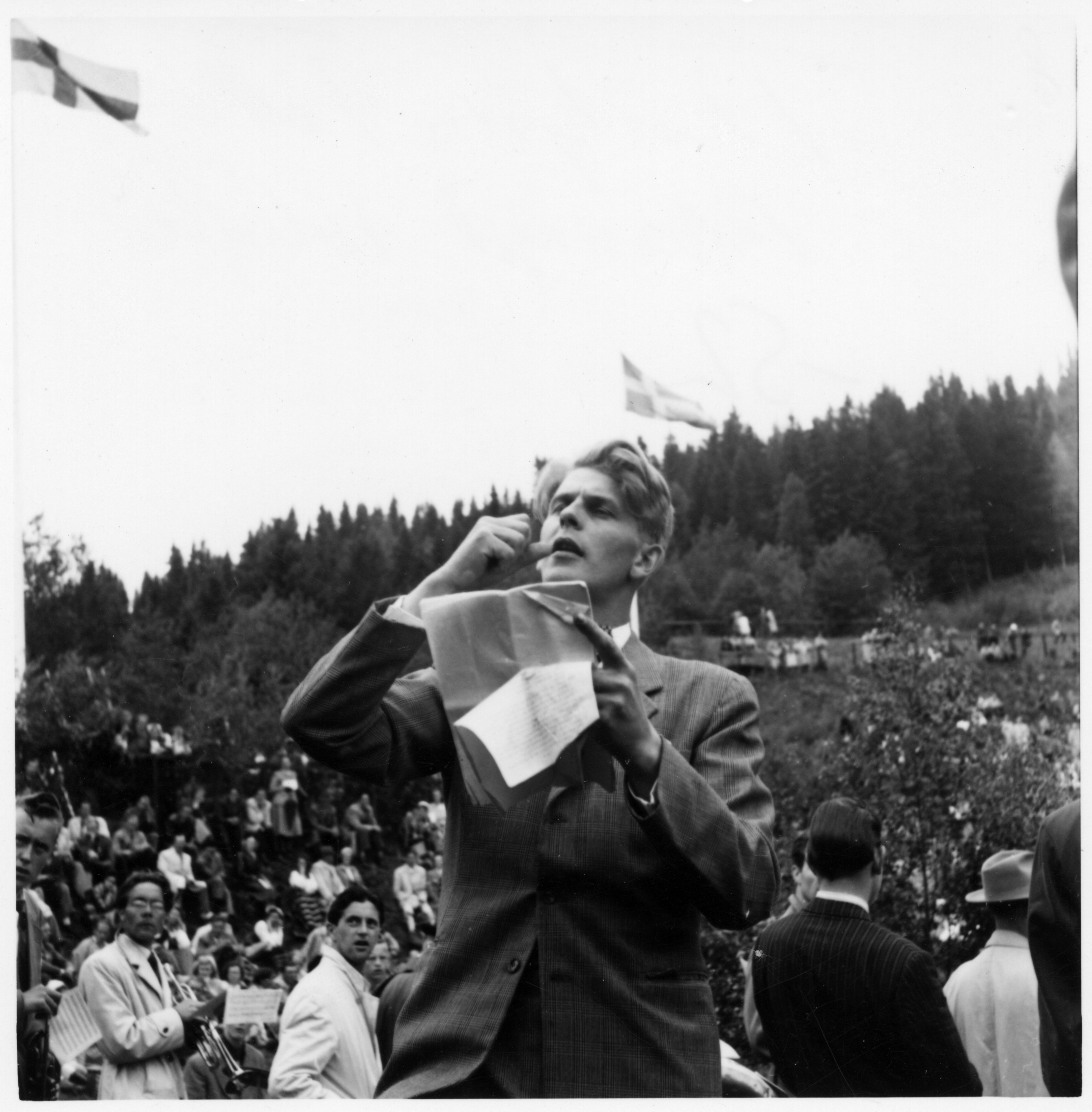
Fälldin at the Centre Party congress in Sollefteå, 1952.

Nils Olof Thorbjörn Fälldin was born on 24 April 1926 in Högsjö parish, Ångermanland. He was the son of the farmer Nils Johan Fälldin and his wife Hulda (née Olsson), who were involved in agriculturally focused political and civic associations. Fälldin grew up in a farming family in Ångermanland. He grew up on the family farm in Ramvik, which later became his home as an adult. He completed his formal schooling at the age of 19.

Fälldin worked as a sheep farmer. In 1956, he and his wife, as a newlywed young couple, took over a small farm. However, the farming authorities did not approve the purchase, as the farm was considered too small and too run down for production, and so refused to provide farm subsidies. This fight led him into the youth branch of the Swedish agrarian party Farmers' League (Bondeförbundet), which in 1958 changed its name to the Centre Party. He and his family maintained their farm throughout his political life, and when he resigned from politics in 1985, he immediately returned to it.

== Political rise ==
=== Political beginnings ===
A Centrist poster for the 1970 elections, featuring (left to right) Johannes Antonsson, party leader Gunnar Hedlund, and Fälldin. The text reads: "Experience, youthful thinking. The Centre."

Fälldin entered the Swedish national political stage when he was elected to the Second Chamber of the Swedish Riksdag in 1958 for the agrarian-rooted Centre Party. He was part of a younger generation of activists within the party that wished to expand its appeal to urban voters. He was distinguished by his skepticism of social democracy and trade unions.

Fälldin lost the seat by 11 votes in 1964. He was then elected to the party board and met with local party organizations, which raised his profile among the Centrists. In 1966 he gained a seat in the First Chamber, where he befriended the leader of the Liberal Party. Fälldin then regained his Second Chamber seat in 1968. In that election, the Centre Party overtook the Liberals as the second-largest party.

Competing against his rival Johannes Antonsson, he won a party election to became vice-chairman of the party in 1969. Fälldin was able to secure the position without the support of the chairman, Gunnar Hedlund. For the 1970 general election, the Centre Party adopted a new platform that sought to expand the party's appeal to the urban working class, and advocated for decentralization and wage equality between industrial and agricultural workers. The party again came in second, with 19.9%, an increase from the previous election.

In 1971, Fälldin succeeded Hedlund as party chairman. This made him the leader of the largest opposition party, and thus the frontrunner for prime minister from the nonsocialist bloc. Also in 1971 he became a member of the new unicameral Riksdag that replaced the bicameral. With Fälldin's ascension to the leadership, criticism of the Social Democratic Party increased.

In 1970 and 1971, the Social Democratic government proposed a plan to construct eleven nuclear reactors, which was approved nearly unanimously by the Riksdag. However, by 1973, Fälldin adopted a strong anti-nuclear stance due to his interactions with the scientist Hannes Alfvén and the anti-nuclear Centrist politician Birgitta Hambraeus. Around the same time, the government of Social Democratic prime minister Olof Palme had proposed a plan to develop 15 nuclear reactors by 1985 in response to the 1973 oil crisis, which was opposed to Fälldin's vision of a "green revolution". The Centre Party was thus the only major political party in an industrialized western country of the 1970s to take an anti-nuclear stance.

=== Election of 1973 ===
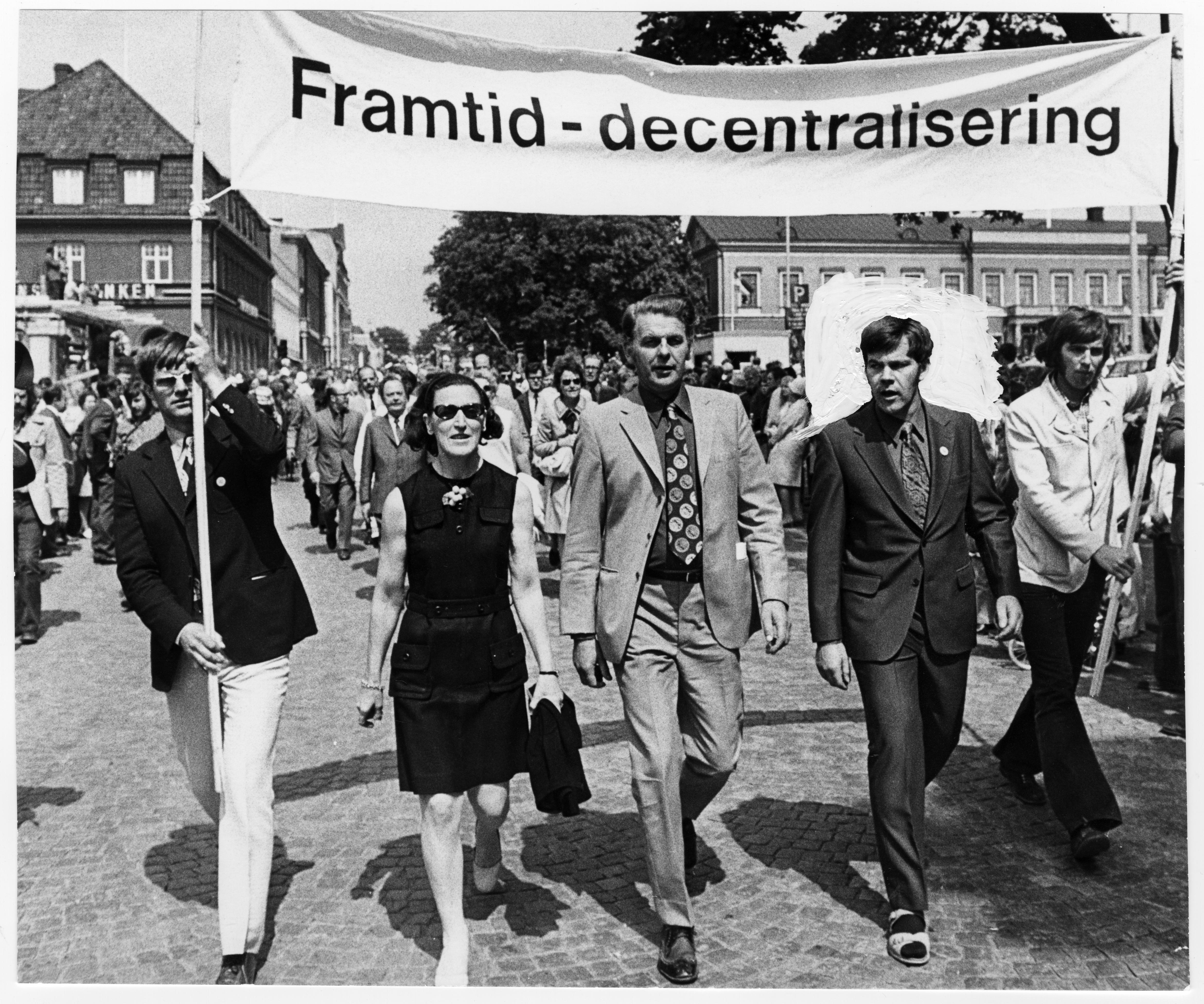
Centre Party politicians, 1972. In the center, from left to right: Sonja Fredgardh, Fälldin, and Karl Erik Olsson. The banner reads, "Future - decentralization".

During the 1973 general election, Fälldin held a live televised debate against Social Democratic party leader and prime minister Olof Palme, which were in the process of becoming a staple of Swedish politics. The members of the nonsocialist bloc emphasized different policies. Fälldin and the Centrists pushed for decentralisation, while the Liberals emphasized environmental and tax policies, and the Moderate Party placed focus on tax and educational reforms. Fälldin also accused the Social Democrats of failing to fight unemployment. Although Fälldin had recently adopted his anti-nuclear stance, nuclear power was not a major issue in the 1973 election, only first becoming a major issue in the time between the 1973 and 1976 elections.

That year, Fälldin proposed that the party should merge with the Liberal Party, but he failed to gain the support of a majority of party members. The Centre Party received 25.1% of the votes that year, their highest share for a Riksdag election up to that point and since. Both the socialist and non-socialist blocs each received 175 seats, with Palme's Social Democrats remaining in power due to the support of the Communist Party and winning drawings to end ties. The difference in votes between the blocs was over 3,700.

=== Election of 1976 ===
During the 1976 election, Fälldin again debated Palme. Although Palme was perceived as a better debater, Fälldin was perceived as a having won more sympathy with voters, contrasting with Palme's aggressive style. In particular, Fälldin emotionally criticized the government's proposed nuclear power program, which has been described as a turning point in the Centrists' favor. This also complicated the non-socialist coalition talks, as the Liberals and the Moderates had supported the government's nuclear program. Due to this, the Liberals and Moderates placed little to no emphasis on nuclear energy during the campaign, in sharp contrast to its heavy emphasis in the Centrist ads. The three parties initially agreed to a two-year pause on orders for new nuclear reactors.

During the campaign, Fälldin's political opponents praised him for honesty and similarities to rural voters, but criticized his lack of foreign policy experience and his inability to understand English. Sweden had a strong economy, which the Social Democrats touted, while stating that the opposition would cut back on the country's expansive welfare programs. The nonsocialists denied that they would remove social benefits, and criticized the country's high direct taxation.

In the election, the Social Democrats finally lost power, having governed the country for the past 44 years. The Centre party's percentage dropped slightly from the previous election, garnering 24.1%, and lost four seats, bringing their total to 86. The party had seen its share of the vote increase in every election from 1956 to 1973, with a small recession in 1964. The 1976 election would begin a consistent trend of decreases in the party's vote share, and was the last time that the Centre was the largest nonsocialist party. The nonsocialist bloc won 180 Riksdag seats combined, while Palme's Social Democrats and the Left Party obtained 169 seats. The non-Socialist parties (the Centre Party, the Liberal Party and the Conservative Moderate Party) formed a coalition government, and, as the Centre Party was the largest of the three, Fälldin was elected prime minister by the Riksdag and confirmed by king Carl XVI Gustaf during a Council of State, being the first person appointed in this manner under the new 1974 Instrument of Government.

== Premiership ==
=== Administration and elections ===
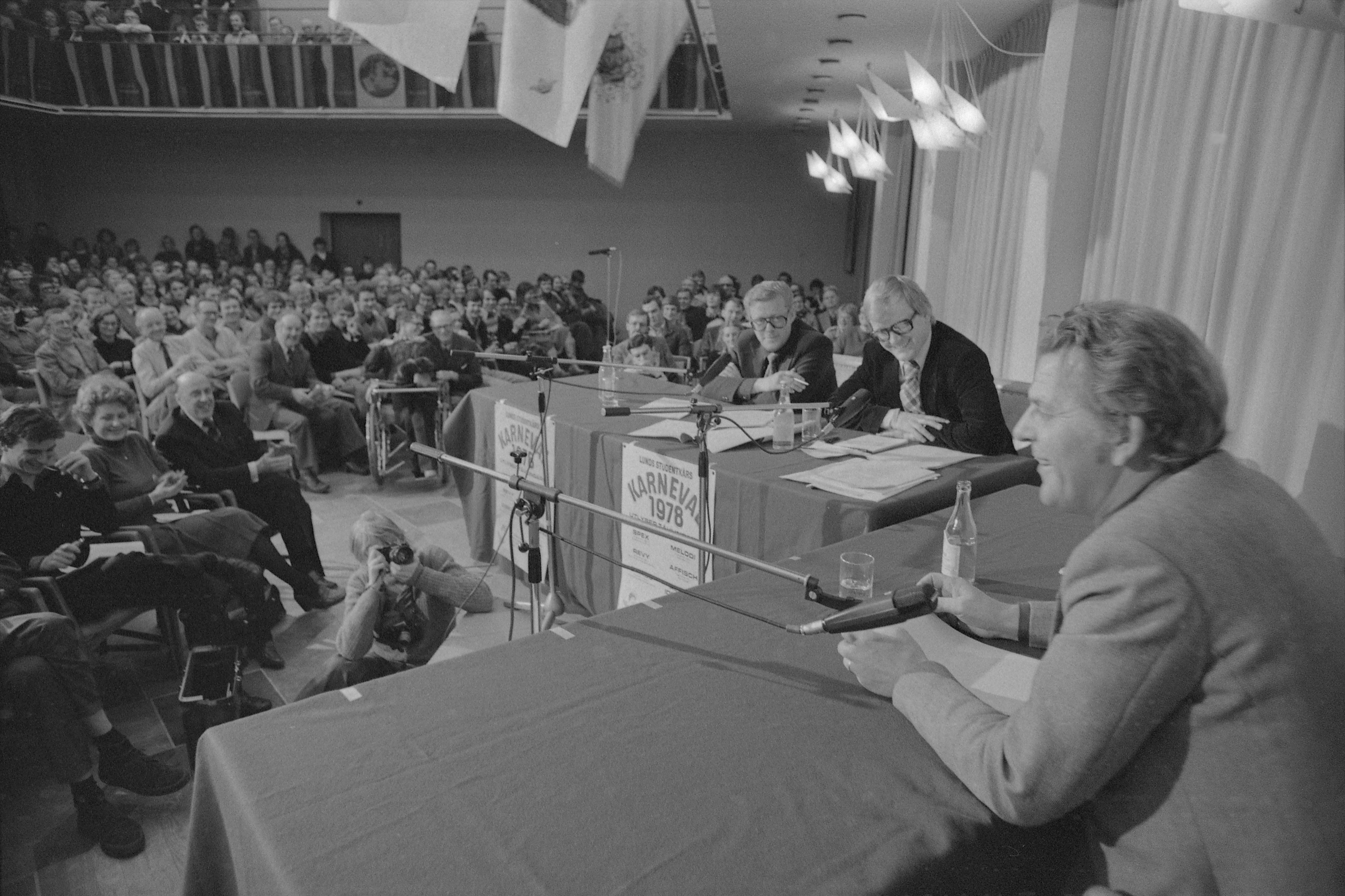
Fälldin (right) speaking to Studentafton in Lund (1978)

Fälldin's initial tenure was the first time a member of the Centre Party headed a Swedish government since Axel Pehrsson-Bramstorp's brief government forty years earlier, in 1936. Fälldin and his first government took office on 7 October 1976. It consisted of 8 Centrists, 6 Moderates, 5 Liberals, and the independent minister of justice. Fälldin appointed Liberal leader Per Ahlmark to the newly created position of deputy prime minister and as minister for employment. Moderate Party leader Gösta Bohman became the finance minister. He also appointed fellow Centrist Karin Söder to serve as foreign minister, making her the first woman to hold that role. There were four other women in the cabinet. He also made the anti-nuclear Olof Johansson the energy minister. Ahlmark left party politics in March of 1978, and was succeeded as deputy prime minister by the new Liberal leader, Ola Ullsten.

Two years later, however, the coalition fell apart over the issue of Swedish dependency on nuclear power (with the Centre Party taking a strong anti-nuclear stand), which caused the Centrists to leave the government. Fälldin presented his resignation on 5 October 1978, and was succeeded on 18 October by Ola Ullsten, who formed a minority Liberal government. That year, Fälldin also sued Aftonbladet for 1 krona after they published a satirical interview with him from a mental hospital in which they claimed he had schizophrenia. Fälldin claimed that this was illegal, but later lost the case.

Following the 1979 election, Fälldin regained the post of prime minister, despite his party suffering major losses and losing its leading role in the centre-right camp, primarily due to public disenchantment with the Centre Party over its compromise on nuclear power with the nuclear-friendly Moderates, and he again formed a coalition government with the Liberals and the Moderates. This cabinet also lasted for two years. On 4 May 1981, the Moderates withdrew from the coalition due to disagreements over tax policy. However, they offered tacit support to the government so as not to trigger an early election. Fälldin continued as prime minister until the election in 1982, when the Social Democrats regained power as the Socialist bloc won a majority in the Riksdag. On 8 October 1982, Fälldin was succeeded by Palme.

=== Economic policy ===
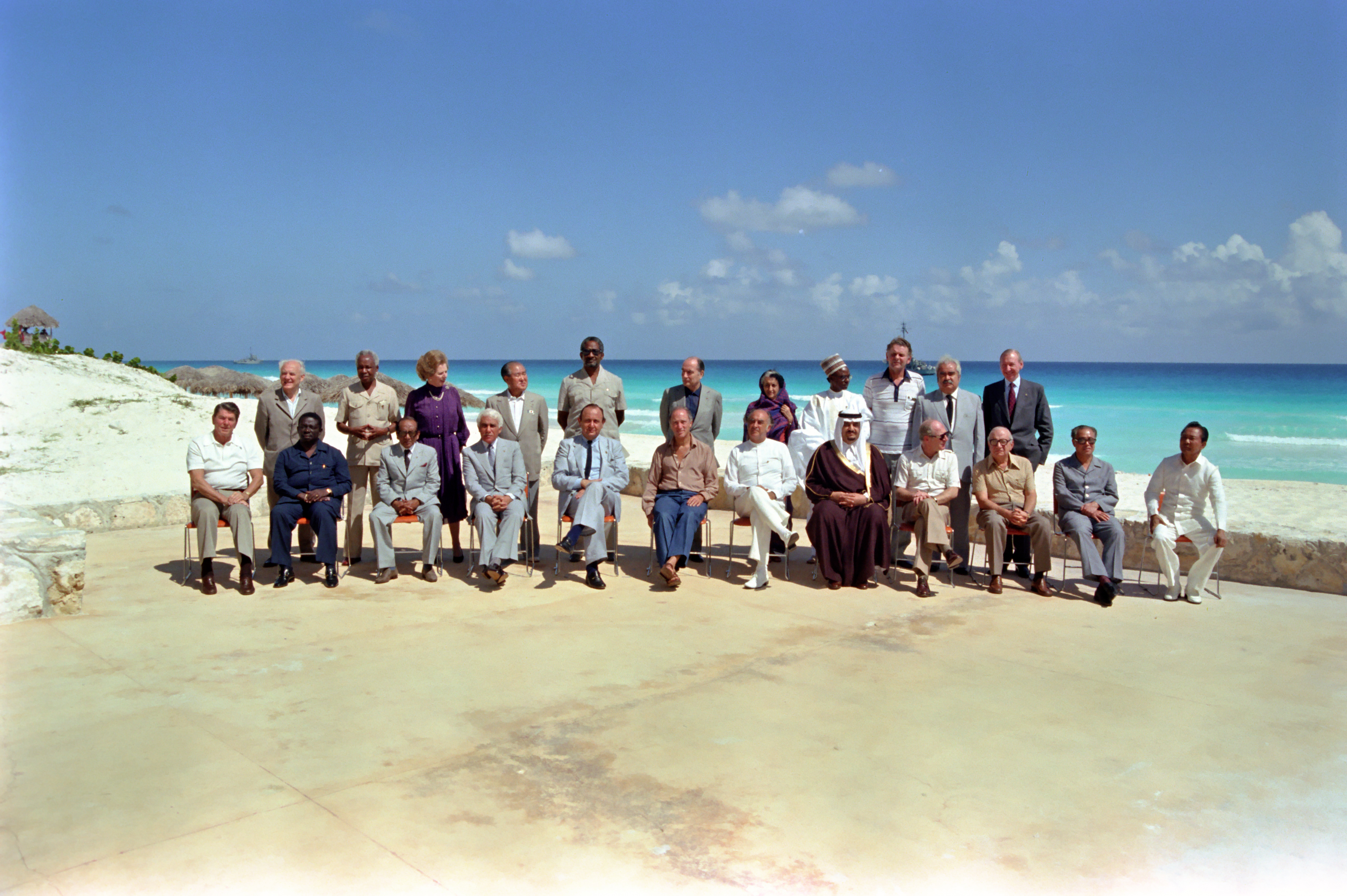
Heads of state at the North–South Summit in 1981. Fälldin is the third from the right in the standing row.

Although their goal was to prove that an alternative to the Social Democrats existed, the nonsocialist governments pursued similar policies. Fälldin once commented on the similarities in social policy, commenting that, as far as was concerned, "it is hard to see any difference between the Center Party and the Liberal Party on the one hand and the social democrats on the other, when it comes to social responsibility for people."

Shortly after assuming office, Fälldin's government received requests by many industrial firms for state support. Fälldin at first resisted, but eventually the government began to intervene in various sectors of the economy. Many credits and loans were issued, and in many cases, industries were nationalized. Under the six years of opposition government, a greater proportion of industries were nationalized than any of the Social Democratic governments.

Bohman proposed a conservative economic program that would involve reductions in state planning, but Fälldin rejected this. According to sociologist Gøsta Esping-Andersen, Fälldin's government used "full steam Keynesian economics". Fälldin pursued a mix of tax cuts and spending increases, which resulted in Sweden developing unprecedentedly high annual deficits. However, he also took some steps to decrease spending. Plans were made to decrease part-time pension benefits from 65 to 50% of income. It also increased fees for certain types of medical care and housing, and, following Denmark's model, shifted some management of social services onto local governments. Plans were also developed to reduce sick pay from 90% to 80% of income, intended to be implemented in 1983, but these plans were scrapped following Fälldin's defeat in 1982. In 1981, Fälldin agreed with the Social Democrats to delay certain tax cuts until 1983, which caused Bohman to resign from his position and pull the Moderates out of the coalition.

=== Social policy ===
In 1980, Fälldin was asked for his opinion about women being granted abortion rights in the previous half decade. He stated that he would have preferred a more restrictive abortion law, with exceptions for rape and threats to the mother's life. However, the government did not introduce such a law and Fälldin did not push for it. Nevertheless, the statement resulted in protests due to fears of threats to the existing law.

=== Foreign policy ===
Sweden's relations with the United States had deteriorated during Palme's premiership due to his criticism of the Vietnam War. The U.S. viewed Fälldin as more pro-American due to his less anti-American rhetoric. However, his actual policy did not adopt a strong pro-American shift, and he soon reiterated the government's commitment to Swedish neutrality.

Fälldin was critical of the European Community (EC), and did not assign a high priority to relations with the organization. He did not want Sweden to form closer ties with the EC, a policy which would be sharply reversed by the Social Democrats in the 1980s. Fälldin attended the North–South Summit in October of 1981.

== Post-premiership ==
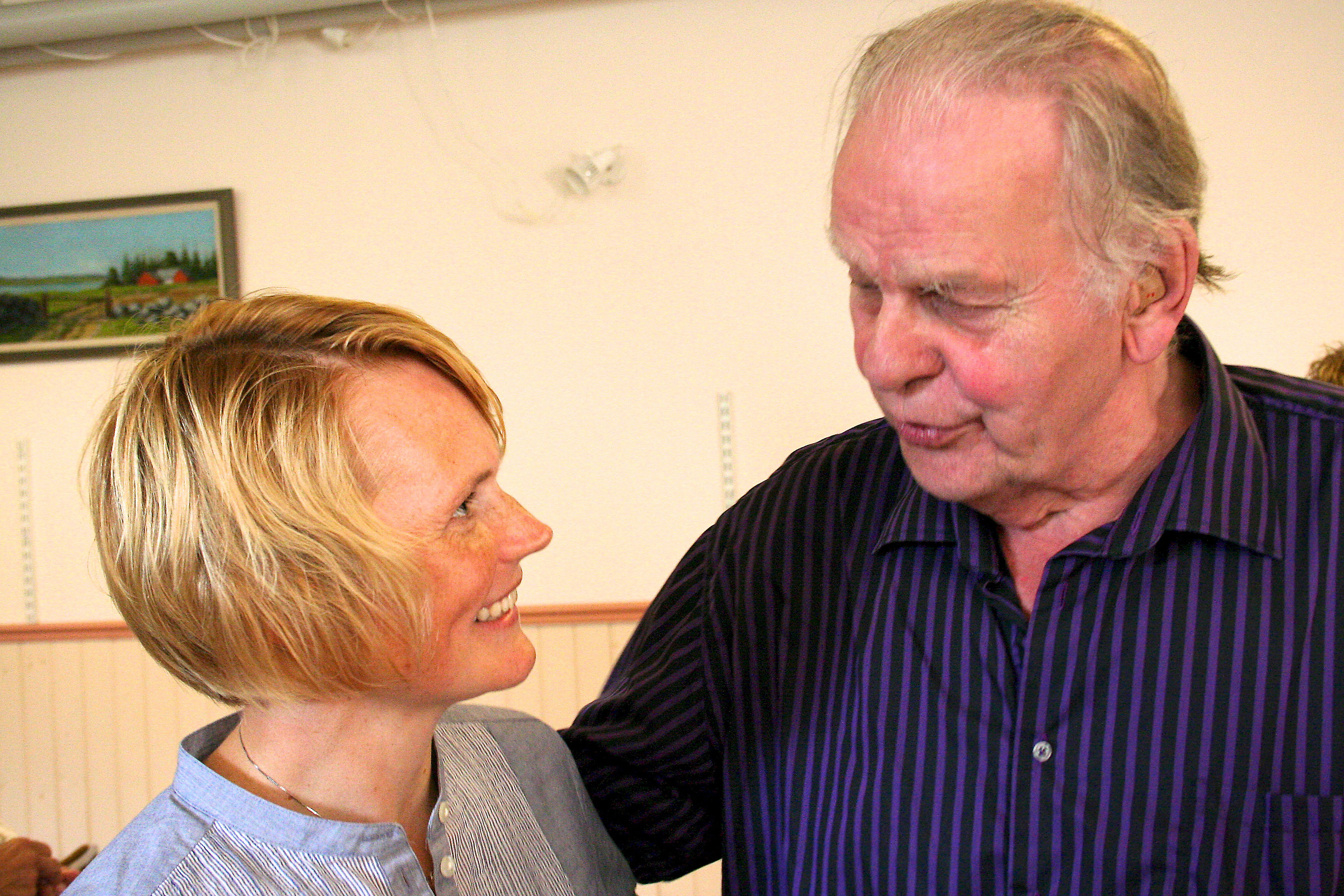
Fälldin with Centrist politician Anna-Karin Hatt in 2011.

After a disastrous second election defeat in 1985, in which the party received 12.45% of votes, Fälldin faced massive criticism from his party. He resigned as party leader on 5 December 1985. He was succeeded by Söder. He then retired from politics. His posts after that time included chairman of Föreningsbanken, Foreningen Norden, and Televerket. Fälldin was offered the position of a county governor, but he turned the offer down. Several subsequent Centre Party leaders personally sought his advice.

Fälldin was the first person to receive a membership card for the organization Smokepeace, founded in 1989. The group sought to lobby against smoking bans and for the rights of smokers. It was thought that Fälldin's involvement would attract more attention from politicians. In 1989, Fälldin and the group's chairman Bengt Öste began the group's first advertising campaign with a press conference.

== Personal life ==
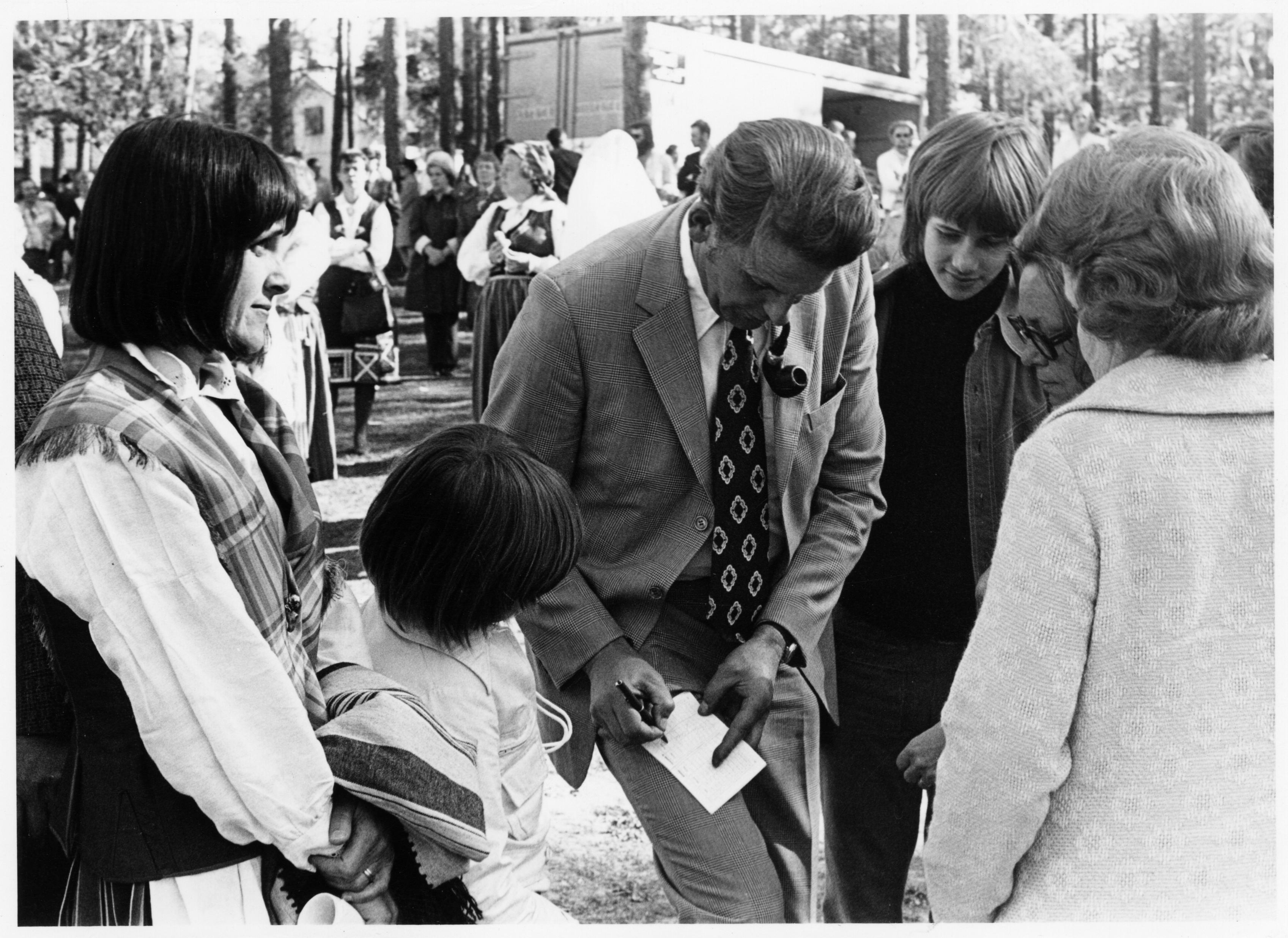
Fälldin smoking his signature pipe and signing an autograph in the 1960s. His wife Solveig is to the left.

In 1956, he married Solveig Öberg (born 1935), daughter of the farmer Albert Öberg and Sofia (née Näsman). They had three children; Eva, Nicklas, and Pontus; as well as several grandchildren and great-grandchildren. Fälldin was one of the board members of the Knut and Alice Wallenberg Foundation in the 1970s.

Fälldin was a pipe smoker, but he quit in 1996 after receiving coronary artery surgery. In his final years, his health deteriorated, and he was treated for many illnesses, including angina, pneumonia, and dizziness. He died at the age of 90, on 23 July 2016. The funeral was held on 11 August 2016 in Härnösand Cathedral, and he was buried at Högsjö Cemetery in Högsjö, Härnösand Municipality.

== Legacy ==
During his 27 years as a national politician, Fälldin was generally appreciated in most political camps for his straightforwardness, unpretentiousness, and willingness to listen to all views. His two periods as Prime Minister were far from easy; trying to get three very different parties to work together in a coalition, while Sweden underwent its worst recession since the 1930s. Fälldin's popularity came through his image as a simple northern sheep farmer whose political career stemmed from strong moral conviction. Although Fälldin's government was relatively short-lived, Christine Agius credits him with influencing the Social Democrats upon their return to power in 1982.

Fälldin refused to allow security concerns to rule his life. During his years as prime minister, he lived on his own in a small rented apartment in central Stockholm, while his family ran the farm up in northern Sweden. He did his own cooking and carried out refuse in the morning to the communal dustbins in the backyard, before taking a brisk 15-minute walk to his office, shadowed at a distance by an unmarked police car which had been waiting outside the apartment block; his only concession to the security concerns.

While serving as prime minister during the U 137 crisis in October–November 1981, Fälldin is remembered for the simple answer "Hold the border!" (Håll gränsen!) to the request for instructions from the Supreme Commander of the Swedish Armed Forces when faced with a suspected Soviet raid to free the stranded submarine. During the 2024 European Parliament election in Sweden, the Centre Party used the phrase as a slogan, representing the party's support of stopping imports of Russian fossil fuel and ending EU subsidies to fossil fuels.

The U 137 crisis was dramatized in the 2024 Swedish satirical series Whiskey on the Rocks. Fälldin was portrayed by the Swedish actor Rolf Lassgård, who was reportedly Fälldin's favorite actor.

== Awards and decorations ==
- Grand Cross of the Order of the White Rose of Finland (November 1990)
- (Norway) Commander with Star of the Royal Norwegian Order of Merit (1 July 1999)

== Cabinets ==
- Fälldin I Cabinet
- Fälldin II Cabinet
- Fälldin III Cabinet

Party political offices
Preceded by Gunnar Hedlund	Chairman of the Centre Party of Sweden; 1971–1985	Succeeded by Karin Söder
Political offices
Preceded by Olof Palme	Prime Minister of Sweden; 1976–1978	Succeeded by Ola Ullsten
Preceded by Ola Ullsten	Prime Minister of Sweden; 1979–1982	Succeeded by Olof Palme
