= Minister for Infrastructure (Sweden) =

Swedish cabinet position

Minister for Infrastructure of Sweden
- Infrastrukturminister
- Lesser coat of arms of Sweden

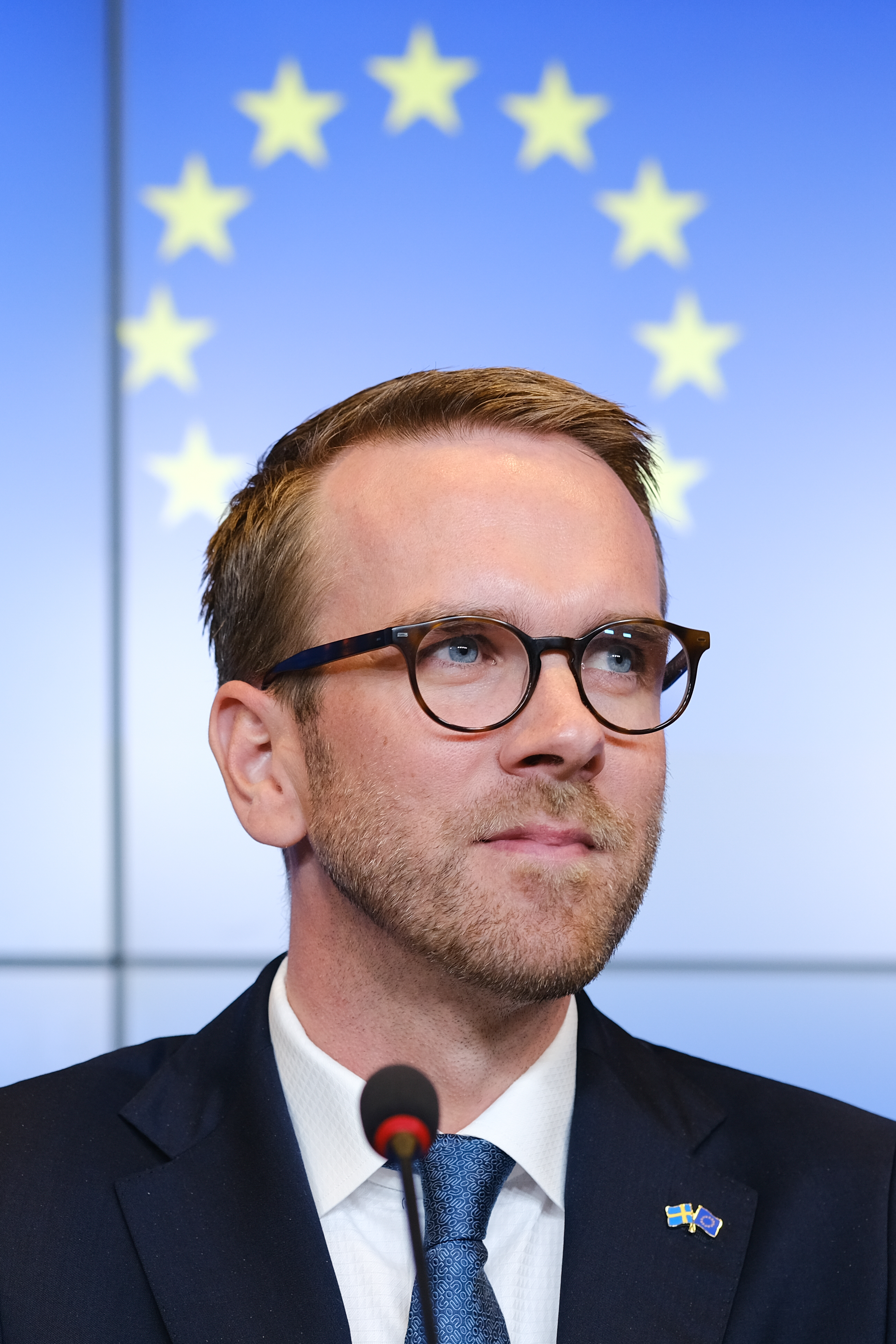
- Incumbent; Andreas Carlson since 18 October 2022
- Appointer: The Prime Minister
- Term length: No fixed term; Serves as long as the Prime Minister sees fit
- Formation: 1920
- First holder: Carl Svensson
- Website: www.regeringen.se/sb/d/13484

The Minister for Infrastructure (Swedish: Infrastrukturminister) is a cabinet minister within the Government of Sweden and appointed by the Prime Minister of Sweden.

== History ==
The office was formed in 1920 as the Minister of Communications (Transport) (Note: Minister of Communications (Transport); (Br) Minister of Transport [and of Civil Aviation]) (Swedish: Kommunikationsminister) which headed the Ministry of Communications (Transport). The office was renamed to Minister for Infrastructure in 2000.

The minister is responsible for issues regarding railways, rapid transit, roads, bridges, ferries, shipping, sea lanes, ports, aviation, transportation, communication and communication research. The current Minister for Infrastructure is Andreas Carlson, appointed on 18 October 2022.

== List of ministers ==
=== Communications (transport) ===
Portrait		Ministers of Communications (Transport) (Born-Died)	Term			Political party	Coalition	Cabinet
Portrait		Ministers of Communications (Transport) (Born-Died)	Took office	Left office	Duration	Political party	Coalition	Cabinet
1	Carl Svensson	Carl Svensson (1879–1938)	1 July 1920	27 October 1920	118 days	Social Democrats	S	Branting I
2	Walter Murray	Walter Murray (1871–1957)	27 October 1920	13 October 1921	351 days	Independent	Caretaker	De Geer d.y. von Sydow
3	Anders Örne	Anders Örne (1881–1956)	13 October 1921	19 April 1923	1 year, 188 days	Social Democrats	S	Branting II
4	Sven Lübeck	Sven Lübeck (1877–1941)	19 April 1923	18 October 1924	1 year, 182 days	Electoral League	National Party	Trygger
5	Viktor Larsson	Viktor Larsson (1869–1950)	18 October 1924	7 June 1926	1 year, 232 days	Social Democrats	S	Branting III; Sandler
6	Carl Meurling	Carl Meurling (1876–1963)	7 June 1926	2 October 1928	2 years, 117 days	Independent	Free-minded–L	Ekman I
7	Theodor Borell	Theodor Borell (1869–1944)	2 October 1928	7 June 1930	1 year, 248 days	Electoral League	Electoral League	Lindman II
8	Ola Jeppsson	Ola Jeppsson (1887–1941)	7 June 1930	24 September 1932	2 years, 109 days	Free-minded People's	Free-minded	Ekman II; Hamrin
9	Henning Leo	Henning Leo (1885–1953)	24 September 1932	19 June 1936	3 years, 269 days	Social Democrats	S	Hansson I
10	Arthur Heiding	Arthur Heiding (1883–1973)	19 June 1936	28 September 1936	101 days	Centre	C	Pehrsson-Bramstorp
11	Albert Forslund	Albert Forslund (1881–1954)	28 September 1936	16 December 1938	2 years, 79 days	Social Democrats	S–C	Hansson II
12	Gerhard Strindlund	Gerhard Strindlund (1890–1957)	16 December 1938	13 December 1939	362 days	Centre	S–C	Hansson II
13	Gustaf Andersson	Gustaf Andersson (1884–1961)	13 December 1939	30 September 1944	4 years, 292 days	Liberals	S–C–M–L	Hansson III
14	Fritiof Domö	Fritiof Domö (1889–1961)	30 September 1944	31 July 1945	304 days	Moderate	S–C–M–L	Hansson III
15	Torsten Nilsson	Torsten Nilsson (1905–1997)	31 July 1945	1 October 1951	6 years, 62 days	Social Democrats	S	Hansson IV; Erlander I
16	Sven Andersson	Sven Andersson (1910–1987)	1 October 1951	22 March 1957	5 years, 172 days	Social Democrats	S–C	Erlander II
17	Sture Henriksson	Sture Henriksson (1917–1957)	22 March 1957	22 April 1957 †	31 days	Social Democrats	S–C	Erlander II
18	Gösta Skoglund	Gösta Skoglund (1903–1988)	26 April 1957	25 November 1965	8 years, 217 days	Social Democrats	S–C (BF left in October 1957)	Erlander II; Erlander III
19	Olof Palme	Olof Palme (1927–1986)	25 November 1965	28 September 1967	1 year, 307 days	Social Democrats	S	Erlander III
20	Svante Lundkvist	Svante Lundkvist (1919–1991)	29 September 1967	30 June 1969	1 year, 275 days	Social Democrats	S	Erlander III
21	Bengt Norling	Bengt Norling (1925–2002)	1 July 1969	8 October 1976	7 years, 100 days	Social Democrats	S	Erlander III; Palme I
22	Bo Turesson	Bo Turesson (1914–1997)	8 October 1976	18 October 1978	2 years, 10 days	Moderate	C–M–L	Fälldin I
23	Anitha Bondestam	Anitha Bondestam (born 1941)	18 October 1978	12 October 1979	359 days	Liberals	L	Ullsten
24	Ulf Adelsohn	Ulf Adelsohn (born 1941)	12 October 1979	5 May 1981	1 year, 205 days	Moderate	C–M–L	Fälldin II
–	Olof Johansson	Olof Johansson (born 1937); Acting	5 May 1981	22 May 1981	17 days	Centre	C–M–L	Fälldin II
25	Claes Elmstedt	Claes Elmstedt (1928–2018)	22 May 1981	8 October 1982	1 year, 139 days	Centre	C–L	Fälldin III
26	Curt Boström	Curt Boström (1926–2014)	8 October 1982	30 June 1985	2 years, 265 days	Social Democrats	S	Palme II
27	Roine Carlsson	Roine Carlsson (1937–2020)	1 July 1985	17 October 1985	108 days	Social Democrats	S	Palme II
28	Sven Hulterström	Sven Hulterström (born 1938)	18 October 1985	29 January 1989	3 years, 104 days	Social Democrats	S	Palme II; Carlsson I
29	Georg Andersson	Georg Andersson (born 1936)	30 January 1989	4 October 1991	2 years, 248 days	Social Democrats	S	Carlsson I Carlsson II
30	Mats Odell	Mats Odell (born 1947)	4 October 1991	7 October 1994	3 years, 3 days	Christian Democrats	M–C–L–KD	Bildt
31	Ines Uusman	Ines Uusman (born 1948)	7 October 1994	7 October 1998	4 years, 0 days	Social Democrats	S	Carlsson III; Persson
32	Björn Rosengren	Björn Rosengren (born 1942)	7 October 1998	31 December 1998	85 days	Social Democrats	S	Persson
=== Infrastructure ===
Portrait		Minister for Infrastructure (Born-Died)	Term			Political Party	Coalition	Cabinet
Portrait		Minister for Infrastructure (Born-Died)	Took office	Left office	Duration	Political Party	Coalition	Cabinet
1	Björn Rosengren	Björn Rosengren (born 1942)	1 January 1999	16 October 2000	1 year, 289 days	Social Democrats	S	Persson
2	Ulrica Messing	Ulrica Messing (born 1968)	16 October 2000	6 October 2006	5 years, 355 days	Social Democrats	S	Persson
3	Åsa Torstensson	Åsa Torstensson (born 1958)	6 October 2006	5 October 2010	3 years, 364 days	Centre	M–C–L–KD	Reinfeldt
4	Catharina Elmsäter-Svärd	Catharina Elmsäter-Svärd (born 1965)	5 October 2010	3 October 2014	3 years, 363 days	Moderate	M–C–L–KD	Reinfeldt
5	Anna Johansson	Anna Johansson (born 1971)	3 October 2014	27 July 2017	2 years, 297 days	Social Democrats	S–MP	Löfven I
6	Tomas Eneroth	Tomas Eneroth (born 1966)	27 July 2017	18 October 2022	5 years, 83 days	Social Democrats	S–MP	Löfven I Löfven II
7	Andreas Carlson	Andreas Carlson (born 1987)	18 October 2022	Incumbent	3 years, 339 days	Christian Democrats	M–KD–L	Kristersson Cabinet
