= Ingemar Mundebo =

Swedish politician (1930–2018)

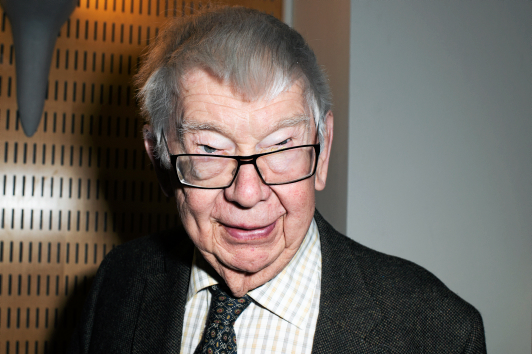
- Born: Kurt Allan Ingemar Mundebo; 15 October 1930; Emmaboda, Sweden
- Died: 7 September 2018 (aged 87); Lidingö, Sweden
- Occupation: politician

Kurt Allan Ingemar Mundebo (15 October 1930 – 7 September 2018) was a Swedish politician who was a member of the Liberal People's Party and former Minister for the Budget (1976–1980) and minister for the economy (1978–1979).

Mundebo was Member of Parliament of Sweden for Stockholm between 1965 and 1980. He was also the Governor of Uppsala County between 1980 and 1986.

== Biography ==
Mundebo was a farm worker from 1944 to 1950 and studied at a folk high school from 1948 to 1950. He took a degree in social work in 1954, a bachelor's degree in 1957 and a licentiate degree in 1964. He was a folk high school teacher from 1956 to 1960 and then a lecturer at the Stockholm Institute for Social Work from 1960 to 1964 and was employed as an administrator at Stockholm University from 1964.

Following the 1976 election Mundebo became Minister for the Budget in the Fälldin I Cabinet. During the Ullsten Cabinet (1978–1979), which only consisted of the Liberal People's Party, he was simultaneously Minister for the Economy. Following the 1979 election, he stayed on as Minister for the Budget in the Fälldin II Cabinet until he was appointed Governor of Uppsala County in 1980.

Mundebo was director general of the Swedish National Accounting and Audit Bureau (Riksrevisionsverket) from 1986 to 1993 and was a director general in the Ministry of Finance from 1993 to 1995.

After his retirement, he enrolled as a postgraduate student at Stockholm University and received a PhD in 2008 with a thesis on management within the Swedish government.

Mundebo was a member of the Royal Gustavus Adolphus Academy from 1981, of the Royal Society of Sciences in Uppsala from 1985 and of the Royal Swedish Academy of Engineering Sciences from 1986.
