= Gösta Bohman =

Swedish politician (1911–1997)

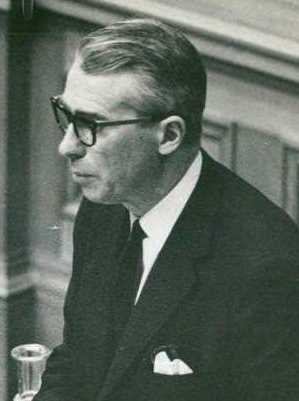

Leader of the Moderate Party
- In office 14 November 1970 – 25 October 1981
- Preceded by: Yngve Holmberg
- Succeeded by: Ulf Adelsohn

Minister of Economics
- In office 12 October 1979 – 5 May 1981
- Prime Minister: Thorbjörn Fälldin
- Preceded by: Ingemar Mundebo
- Succeeded by: Rolf Wirtén
- In office 25 November 1976 – 18 October 1978
- Prime Minister: Thorbjörn Fälldin
- Preceded by: Office established
- Succeeded by: Ingemar Mundebo

Minister for Finance
- In office 8 October 1976 – 24 November 1976
- Prime Minister: Thorbjörn Fälldin
- Preceded by: Gunnar Sträng
- Succeeded by: Office abolished

Personal details
- Born: 15 January 1911 Stockholm, Sweden
- Died: 12 August 1997 (aged 86) Stockholm, Sweden
- Party: Moderate Party
- Spouse(s): Gunnel Mossberg (m. 1939; div. 1953) (m. 1960; died 1994)
- Children: 5, including Kajsa and Mia
- Relatives: Carl Bildt (son-in-law)
- Education: Stockholm University College
- Awards: Illis quorum 1987

Bo Gösta Bohman (15 January 1911 – 12 August 1997) was a Swedish politician and the leader of the Swedish liberal conservative Moderate Party from 1970 to 1981, during a period in which the party strengthened its position in Swedish politics. He served as minister of economics during the three-party centre-right Swedish governments 1976–1978 and 1979–1981. He has since become a model for many Moderate politicians, especially in the Moderate Youth League. His leadership saw a period of liberalisation of the Moderate policies, a process which continues to this day.

== Early life ==
Bohman was born on 15 January 1911 in Stockholm, Sweden, to Conrad Bohman, a managing director, and his wife, Berta (née Gabrielsson). He completed his studentexamen (upper secondary school exam) in 1930 and his reserve officer exam in 1932. In 1943, he reached the rank of captain in the Svea Artillery Regiment's reserve. He earned a law degree (Candidate of Law) in 1936.

== Career ==
Bohman served as a court clerk from 1936 to 1939 before becoming an assistant director at the Stockholm Master Builders' Association (Stockholms byggmästarförening) from 1939 to 1942. In 1942, he was appointed acting secretary to the town-building department (stadsbyggnadsroteln). He then served as secretary of the Stockholm Chamber of Commerce (Stockholms handelskammare) from 1942 to 1948, later becoming its deputy CEO from 1948 to 1970. He was chairman of the Moderate Party from 1970 to 1981 and served as minister of economics from 1976 to 1978 and again from 1979 to 1981.

He was a member of the Stockholm City Real Estate Board (Stockholms stads fastighetsnämnd) from 1945 to 1961 and chairman of the Stockholm Association of Reserve Officers (Reservofficerssällskapet i Stockholm) from 1954 to 1957. In 1958, he was elected to the Second Chamber of Parliament (Right Party). He participated in the Defence Committees of 1960 and 1962, the 1964 Defence Inquiry, and several parliamentary committees, including those on administrative courts, budget reform, and government organization. He chaired the 1964 Fortifications Inquiry and held various leadership or advisory roles in business organizations.

Bohman was a member of parliament from 1958 to 1991, serving as chairman of the Committee of Supply (1965–1970), a member of the Committee on Foreign Affairs (1967–1973), and the Advisory Council on Foreign Affairs (1966–1976). He chaired the Stockholm Conservative Association (Stockholmshögerns förbund) from 1961 to 1963 and was first vice chairman of the Moderate Party from 1965 to 1970. He also served on the Swedish National Commission for UNESCO (Svenska unescorådet) (1959–1963), the Consultative Assembly of the Council of Europe (1963–1976, 1979), the National Swedish Accounting and Audit Bureau (Riksrevisionsverket) (1963–1974), the Swedish Post Office Board (Poststyrelsen) (1965–1970), and the Swedish National Police Board (1985–1993).

== Personal life ==
In 1939, Bohman married librarian Gunnel Mossberg (1913–1994), the daughter of the lawyer Torsten Mossberg and Elin (née Björlin). They had five children: Inger (born 1942), Kajsa (born 1943), Hans Johan (born 1945), Maria (born 1953), and Eva-Lotta (born 1955). His daughter Maria "Mia" Bohman Bildt was married to former Prime Minister of Sweden Carl Bildt from 1984 to 1997.

During the 1980s, his wife Gunnel became increasingly absent and uncontactable. In 1990, Bohman wrote a book about his experiences, The Story of Gunnel - in the Shadow of Alzheimer's.

Gösta Bohman was known for his love for the Stockholm archipelago, where he had a house on a little island in an archipelago named Sundskär located within the Norrtälje Municipality, and often used similes inspired by it in speech and articles. His book Thoughts On My Sweden (Tankar om mitt Sverige) outlined his political views in this context. He also wrote the book Sundskär, En övärld i havsbandet (Sundskär, An archipelago neighboring the sea).

== Awards and decorations ==
=== Swedish ===
- (Sweden) Illis quorum, 18th size (1987)
- (Sweden) Commander of the Order of the Polar Star (6 June 1969)
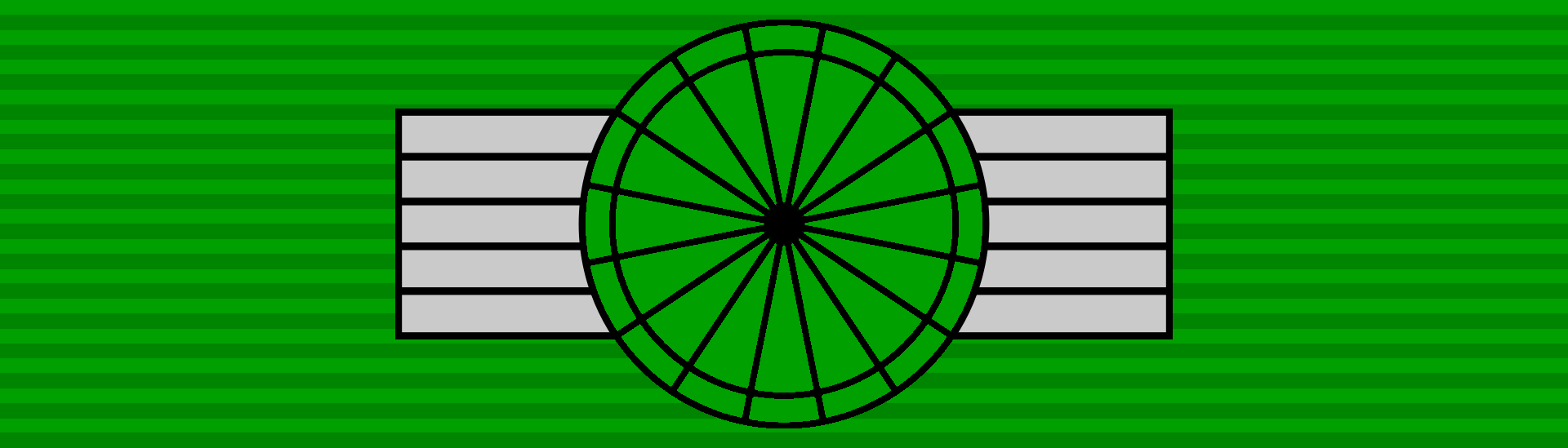
- (Sweden) Commander of the Order of Vasa (6 June 1964)
- (Sweden) Swedish Reserve Officers' Association Badge of Honor (Svenska reservofficersföreningens hederstecken)

=== Foreign ===
- (Italy) 2nd Class / Commander of the Order of the Star of Italian Solidarity
- (Finland) Pro Benignitate Humana
- (Finland) The Finnish Reserve Officers' Association's Golden Badge of Merit
- (Norway) Norwegian Conscript Officers' Golden Badge of Merit

== Bibliography ==
- Bohman, Gösta (1997). Till minne av Gösta Bohman (in Swedish). [Stockholm]: [Moderata samlingspartiet]. SELIBR 2347946.
- Bohman, Gösta; Bohman, Gunnel (1996). I världskrigets skugga: brev under beredskap (in Swedish). Stockholm: Norstedt. ISBN 9119638221. SELIBR 7157158.
- Bohman, Gösta; Larsson Ask, Björn (1993). Sundskär: en övärld i havsbandet (in Swedish). Stockholm: Norstedt. ISBN 911929042X. SELIBR 7156265.
- Bohman, Gösta (1990). Sagan om Gunnel: i Alzheimers skugga (in Swedish). Stockholm: Bonnier. ISBN 9100550817. SELIBR 7148585.
- Bohman, Gösta, ed. (1987). Vad kan medborgaren göra?: om maktbegränsning och civilmotstånd i demokratins Sverige. Makten och friheten, 99-0698818-5 (in Swedish). Stockholm: Timbro. ISBN 9175661349. SELIBR 7648195.
- Bohman, Gösta; Rydén, Sven (1985). I lä av en sjöbod: politiska betraktelser (in Swedish). Stockholm: Bonnier. ISBN 9100466107. SELIBR 7147077.
- Bohman, Gösta (1984). Maktskifte (in Swedish). Stockholm: Bonnier. ISBN 9100462497. SELIBR 7146878.
- Bohman, Gösta, ed. (1982). Demokratins villkor (in Swedish). Stockholm: Sv. tidskrift. ISBN 9197038016. SELIBR 7791279.
- Bohman, Gösta; Gummesson, Ola (1981). Kurs mot framtiden: ett friare och öppnare Sverige (in Swedish). Stockholm: Norstedt. ISBN 9118133711. SELIBR 7153392.
- Bohman, Gösta; Holmberg, John-Henri (1979). Tankar och tal: anföranden och essayer i urval, 1975-1979 (in Swedish). Stockholm: Moderata samlingspartiet. ISBN 9185816019. SELIBR 7752594.
- Bohman, Gösta (1977). Våra möjligheter att klara krisen. Handelsbankens småskriftsseries, 0348-0739 ; 9 (in Swedish). Stockholm: Sv. handelsbanken. SELIBR 146818.
- Bohman, Gösta (1976). Fritid i frihet: tankar om skärgård och svensk natur, om markägande och den egna stugan (in Swedish). Stockholm: Moderata samlingspartiet. SELIBR 248976.
- Bohman, Gösta (1976). De mindre företagen i dagens politiska miljö (in Swedish). [Stockholm?]: Publisher unknown. SELIBR 331888.
- Bohman, Gösta (1974). Den nya individualismen. Debattskrift/Moderata samlingspartiet ; 2 (in Swedish). Norrköping: Publisher unknown. SELIBR 755706.
- Bohman, Gösta (1974). Tankar om mitt Sverige. Partiledaren har ordet, 99-0344177-0 ; 2 (in Swedish). Stockholm: Askild & Kärnekull. ISBN 9170082685. SELIBR 7589397.
- Bohman, Gösta (1970). Inrikes utrikespolitik: det handlar om Vietnam. En Geber pocket, 99-0125087-0 (in Swedish). Stockholm: Geber. SELIBR 8079568.

Party political offices
Preceded by Yngve Holmberg	Leader of the Swedish Moderate Party; 1970–1981	Succeeded by Ulf Adelsohn
