= Ola Ullsten =

Swedish politician and diplomat (1931–2018)

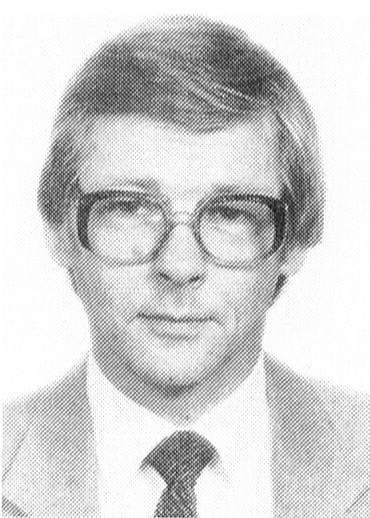

Prime Minister of Sweden
- In office 18 October 1978 – 12 October 1979
- Monarch: Carl XVI Gustaf
- Deputy: Sven Romanus
- Preceded by: Thorbjörn Fälldin
- Succeeded by: Thorbjörn Fälldin

Minister for Foreign Affairs
- In office 12 October 1979 – 8 October 1982
- Prime Minister: Thorbjörn Fälldin
- Preceded by: Hans Blix
- Succeeded by: Lennart Bodström

Deputy Prime Minister of Sweden
- In office 1 August 1980 – 8 October 1982
- Prime Minister: Thorbjörn Fälldin
- Preceded by: Ingemar Mundebo
- Succeeded by: Ingvar Carlsson
- In office 7 March 1978 – 18 October 1978
- Prime Minister: Thorbjörn Fälldin
- Preceded by: Per Ahlmark
- Succeeded by: Sven Romanus

Leader of the Liberal People’s Party
- In office 4 March 1978 – 1 October 1983
- Preceded by: Per Ahlmark
- Succeeded by: Bengt Westerberg

Personal details
- Born: Stig Kjell Olof Ullsten; 23 June 1931 Teg, Sweden
- Died: 28 May 2018 (aged 86) Öja, Sweden
- Party: Liberal People's Party
- Spouse(s): Evi Esko (m. 1961; div. 1981) Louise Beaudoin (m. 1989)
- Children: With Evi Esko: Maria Ullsten; Katarina Ullsten; With Louise Beaudoin: Nicolas Beaudoin-Ullsten; Christian Beaudoin-Ullsten
- Cabinet: Ullsten’s cabinet

Stig Kjell Olof "Ola" Ullsten (23 June 1931 – 28 May 2018) was a Swedish politician and diplomat who was Prime Minister of Sweden from 1978 to 1979 and leader of the Liberal People's Party from 1978 to 1983. He also served as Deputy Prime Minister briefly in 1978 and then again from 1980 to 1982 and served as Minister for Foreign Affairs from 1979 to 1982. Ullsten is Sweden's only Liberal prime minister since the 1930s.

== Background and early career ==
Stig Kjell Olof Ullsten was born in Teg, Västerbotten, a small town that would ultimately be annexed as a part of county capital Umeå. He was the son of forestry inspector Carl Augustin Ullsten and schoolteacher Kristina Ullsten. Ullsten joined the Liberal Youth of Sweden and the People's Party in the spring of 1958.

In his youth he made several travels to the United States, and in 1959 took an active part in the successful campaign to elect liberal Republican Nelson Rockefeller governor of New York. He served as the head of the Liberal Youth of Sweden between 1962 and 1964 and was elected to parliament in 1964.

== Ministerial and political appointments ==
Upon the formation in 1976 of the first non-socialist government in Sweden in 40 years, he was appointed Minister for International Development. When Liberal Party leader Per Ahlmark resigned in 1978, Ullsten was elected party leader.

== Prime Minister of Sweden ==
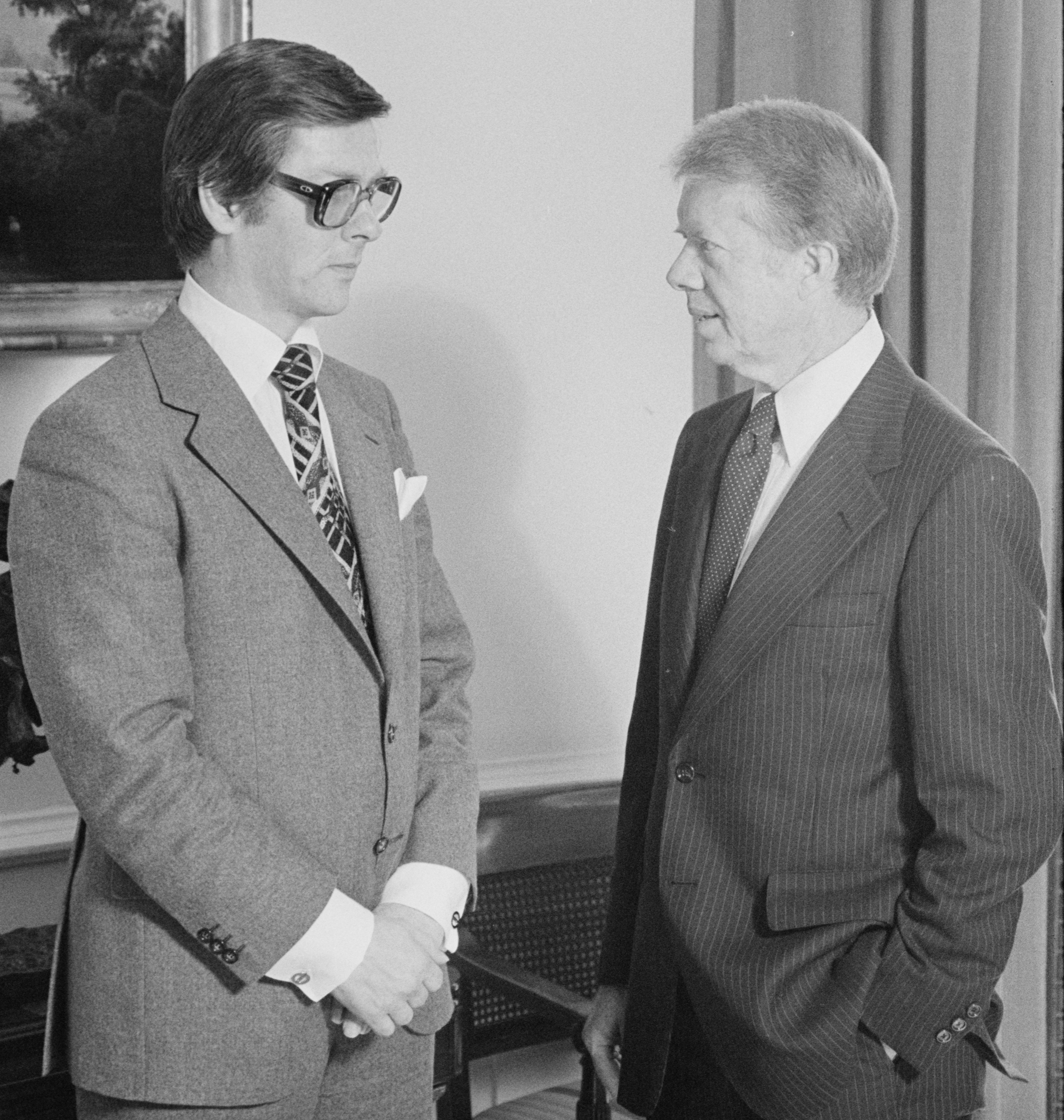
Ullsten speaking with Jimmy Carter in January 1979

Sweden's center-right coalition government broke up later in 1978, mainly owing to disagreements over energy policy. The prime minister, Thorbjörn Fälldin, presented his resignation on 5 October, and Ullsten succeeded him as prime minister on 18 October, heading a minority government consisting of Liberal Party and independent ministers. After the successful survival of the coalition in the 1979 parliamentary elections, he resigned as prime minister in favor of Fälldin, his predecessor.

== Later career ==
He then went on to serve as Minister for Foreign Affairs under the new three-party government of Thorbjörn Fälldin from 1979 to 1982. He has later served as the Swedish Ambassador to Canada, also accredited to The Bahamas from 1984 to 1989 and Italy, also accredited to Albania from 1989 to 1995.

== Personal life ==
In 1961 he married Evi Esko, daughter of the teachers Roman Esko and Elsa Tammik. They divorced in 1981 and in 1989 Ullsten married Louise Beaudoin (born 1954).

Ullsten died on 28 May 2018 at the age of 86 after an unspecified illness. At the time of his death, he had four children and three grandchildren.

== Awards ==
Ullsten was awarded the Illis quorum by the government of Sweden in 2001.

== Bibliography ==
- Folkpartiet och reformerna : liberala riksdagsinitiativ 1902-1960 (1960)
- Guide-lines for international development co-operation (1978)
- Liberaler om utveckling (1978)
- Sweden and the developing countries (1979)
- Vad ska vi göra med kulturpolitiken? : anföranden och kommentarer kring den svenska kulturpolitikens "fem-årsdag" (1979)
- Lättsinnet i siffror : en sammanfattning av socialdemokraternas ställningstaganden till de 15 viktigaste besparingsförslagen (1982)
- Kämpande liberalism : anförande (1982)
- Ola Ullsten : partiledaren, demokraten, internationalisten, folkpartisten, statsministern, idédebattören (1983)
- Så blev det (2013)

== See also ==
- Ullsten Cabinet

Party political offices
Preceded by Per Ahlmark	Leader of the Swedish Liberal People's Party; 1978–1983	Succeeded by Bengt Westerberg
Political offices
Preceded by Thorbjörn Fälldin	Prime Minister of Sweden; 1978–1979	Succeeded by Thorbjörn Fälldin
Preceded by Hans Blix	Minister for Foreign Affairs; 1979–1982	Succeeded by Lennart Bodström
Diplomatic posts
Preceded by Kaj Björk	Ambassador of Sweden to Canada; 1984–1989	Succeeded by Håkan Berggren
Preceded by Kaj Björk	Ambassador of Sweden to The Bahamas; 1985–1989	Succeeded by Håkan Berggren
Preceded by Sven Fredrik Hedin	Ambassador of Sweden to Italy; 1989–1995	Succeeded by Torsten Örn
Preceded by Jan af Sillén	Ambassador of Sweden to Albania; 1992–1995	Succeeded by Torsten Örn
