= 1979 Swedish general election =

- 16 September 1979

All 349 seats in the Riksdag 175 seats needed for a majority
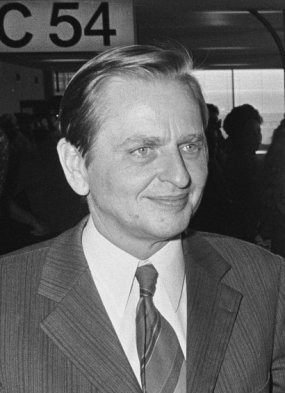

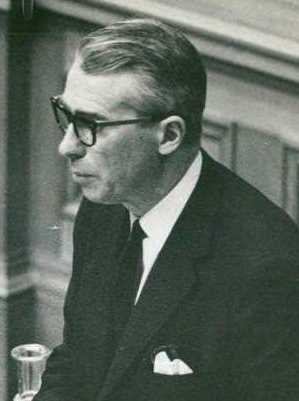

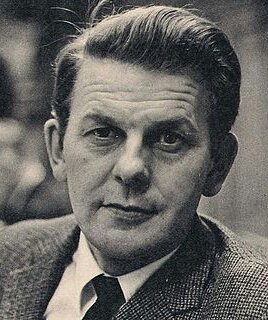

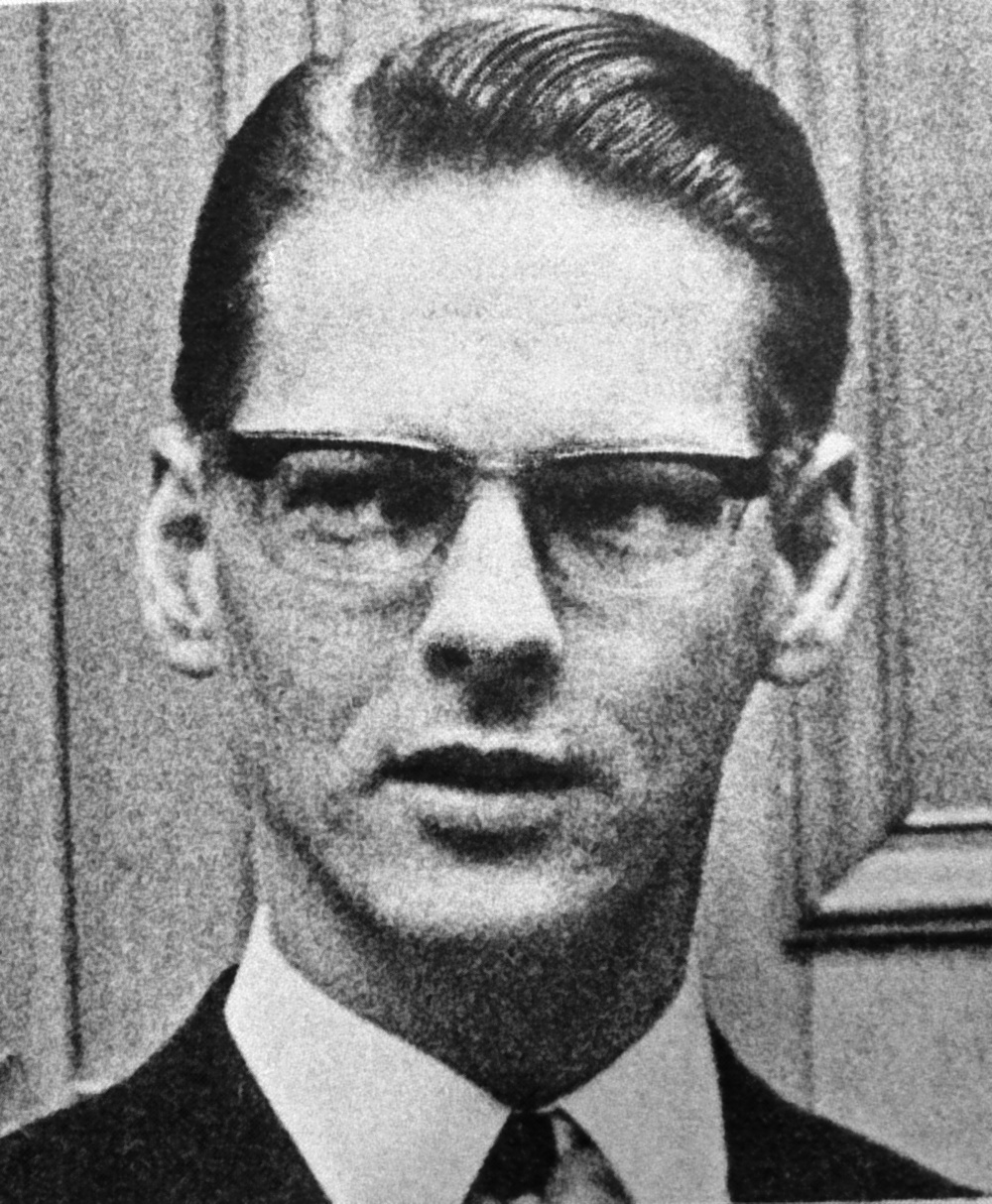

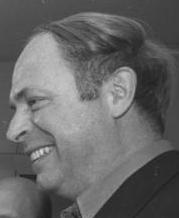
	First party	Second party	Third party
Leader	Olof Palme	Gösta Bohman	Thorbjörn Fälldin
Party	Social Democrats	Moderate	Centre
Last election	152	55	86
Seats won	154	73	64
Seat change	▲2	▲18	▼22
Popular vote	2,356,234	1,108,406	984,589
Percentage	43.24%	20.34%	18.07%
Swing	▲0.49 pp	▲4.75 pp	▼6.01 pp
	Fourth party	Fifth party
Leader	Ola Ullsten	Lars Werner
Party	People's Party	Left Communists
Last election	39	17
Seats won	38	20
Seat change	▼1	▲3
Popular vote	577,063	305,420
Percentage	10.59%	5.61%
Swing	▼0.47 pp	▲0.86 pp
- Map of the election, showing the distribution of constituency and levelling seats, as well as the largest political bloc within each constituency.
PM before election
Ola Ullsten
People's Party
Elected PM
Thorbjörn Fälldin
Centre

General elections were held in Sweden on 16 September 1979. Although the Swedish Social Democratic Party remained the largest party, winning 154 of the 349 seats in the Riksdag, the liberal interim government of Ola Ullsten was succeeded by another centre-right coalition government composed of the People's Party, the Moderate Party and the Centre Party, led by Centre Party leader Thorbjörn Fälldin. The three parties together won 175 seats, compared to the 174 won by the Social Democrats and Communists. It was the only time that non-socialist parties retained power in an election between 1928 and 2010. The Moderates dramatically increased their representation in the Riksdag, becoming the largest party of the non-socialist bloc, a position they maintained until 2022.

Despite the unexpected victory, the coalition split in 1981 when the Moderates withdrew support in protest at Fälldin's tax policies, which they viewed as "too leftist". Despite not being the leader of the coalition party with the most seats, Fälldin had been the designate Prime Minister since his earlier resignation in 1978, upon disagreement over the question of nuclear power.

== Debates ==
1979 Swedish general election debates
Date	Time	Organizers	Moderators	P Present I Invitee N Non-invitee					
Date	Time	Organizers	Moderators	S	M	C	L	V	Refs
		Sveriges Television	Ingemar Odlander	P Olof Palme	P Gösta Bohman	P Thorbjörn Fälldin	P Ola Ullsten	P Lars Werner	

== Results ==
Party	Votes	%	Seats	+/–
Swedish Social Democratic Party	2,356,234	43.24	154	+2
Moderate Party	1,108,406	20.34	73	+18
Centre Party	984,589	18.07	64	–22
People's Party	577,063	10.59	38	–1
Left Party Communists	305,420	5.61	20	+3
Christian Democratic Unity	75,993	1.39	0	0
Communist Party	10,862	0.20	0	0
Workers Party Communists	10,725	0.20	0	New
Other parties	19,346	0.36	0	0
Total	5,448,638	100.00	349	0
Valid votes	5,448,638	99.43		
Invalid/blank votes	31,488	0.57		
Total votes	5,480,126	100.00		
Registered voters/turnout	6,040,461	90.72		
Source: Nohlen & Stöver

=== Seat distribution ===
Constituency	Total seats	Seats won						
Constituency	Total seats	By party					By coalition	
Constituency	Total seats	S	M	C	F	V	Right	Left
Älvsborg North	9	4	2	2	1		5	4
Älvsborg South	8	3	2	2	1		5	3
Blekinge	6	3	1	1	1		3	3
Bohus	11	4	3	2	2		7	4
Fyrstadskretsen	21	9	6	2	3	1	11	10
Gävleborg	13	7	1	3	1	1	5	8
Gothenburg	19	7	5	2	3	2	10	9
Gotland	2	1		1			1	1
Halland	10	4	2	3	1		6	4
Jämtland	5	3		2			2	3
Jönköping	13	5	3	3	2		8	5
Kalmar	10	5	2	2	1		5	5
Kopparberg	13	6	2	3	1	1	6	7
Kristianstad	11	5	3	2	1		6	5
Kronoberg	7	3	2	2			4	3
Malmöhus	11	5	3	2	1		6	5
Norrbotten	11	6	1	2	1	1	4	7
Örebro	12	6	2	2	1	1	5	7
Östergötland	17	8	3	3	2	1	8	9
Skaraborg	10	4	2	3	1		6	4
Södermanland	11	6	2	2	1		5	6
Stockholm County	33	13	9	4	4	3	17	16
Stockholm Municipality	31	11	9	3	4	4	16	15
Uppsala	10	4	2	2	1	1	5	5
Värmland	12	6	2	2	1	1	5	7
Västerbotten	10	5	1	2	1	1	4	6
Västernorrland	12	6	1	3	1	1	5	7
Västmanland	11	5	2	2	1	1	5	6
Total	349	154	73	64	38	20	175	174
Source: Statistics Sweden

=== By municipality ===
Votes by municipality. The municipalities are the color of the party that got the most votes within the coalition that won relative majority.

Cartogram of the map to the left with each municipality rescaled to the number of valid votes cast.

Map showing the voting shifts from the 1976 to the 1979 election. Darker blue indicates a municipality voted more towards the parties that formed the centre-right bloc. Darker red indicates a municipality voted more towards the parties that form the left-wing bloc.

Votes by municipality as a scale from red/Left-wing bloc to blue/Centre-right bloc.

Cartogram of vote with each municipality rescaled in proportion to number of valid votes cast. Deeper blue represents a relative majority for the centre-right coalition, brighter red represents a relative majority for the left-wing coalition.
