= 1982 Swedish general election =

1982 election for the Swedish parliament

- 19 September 1982

All 349 seats in the Riksdag 175 seats needed for a majority
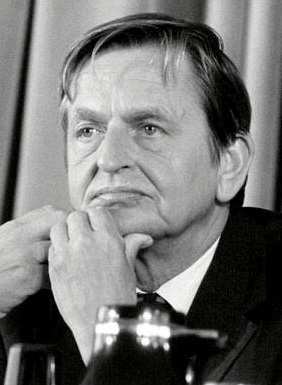

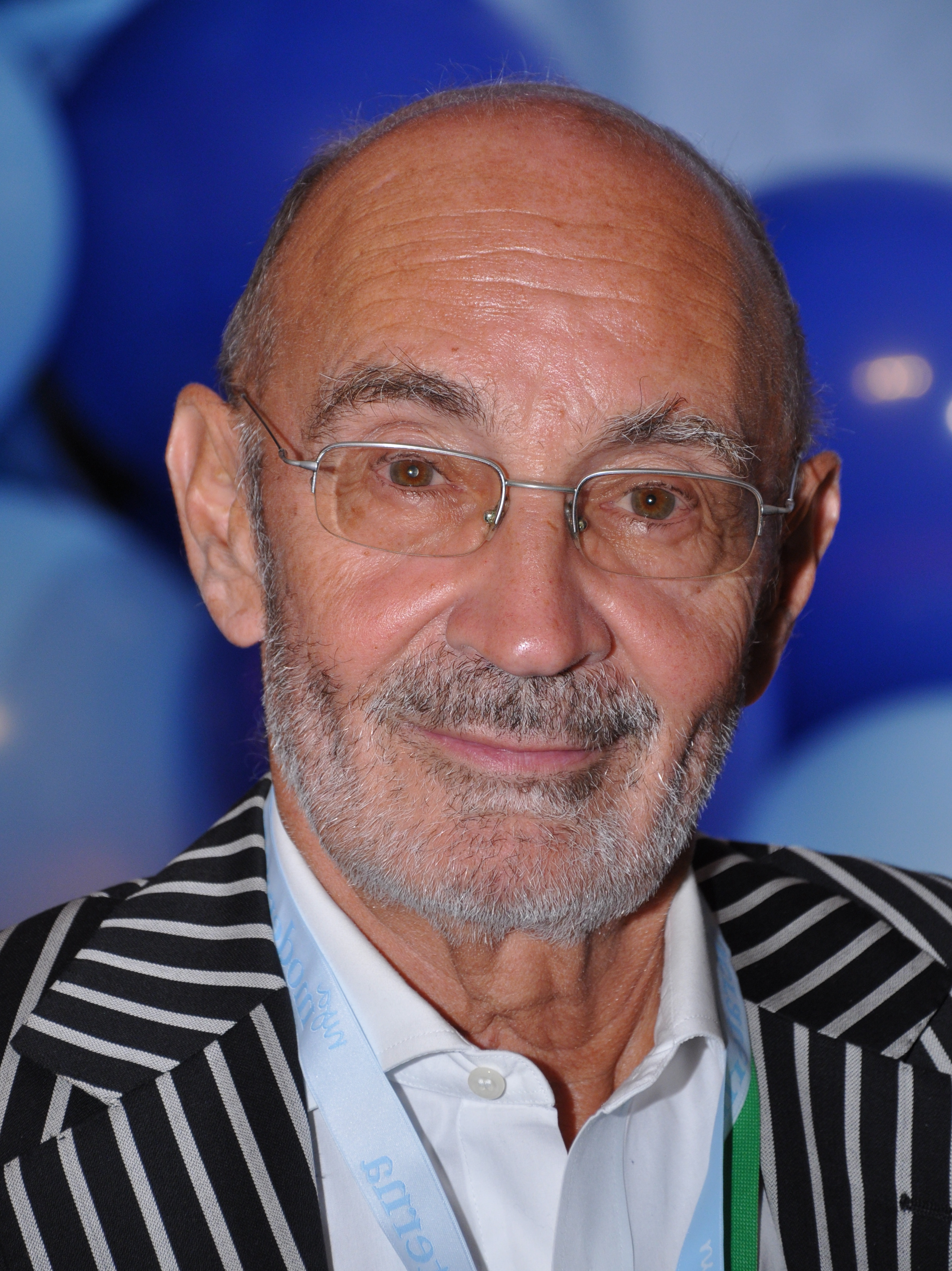

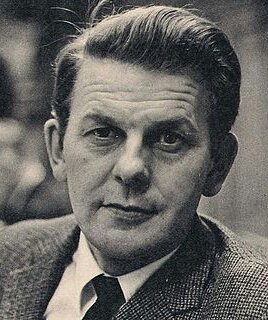

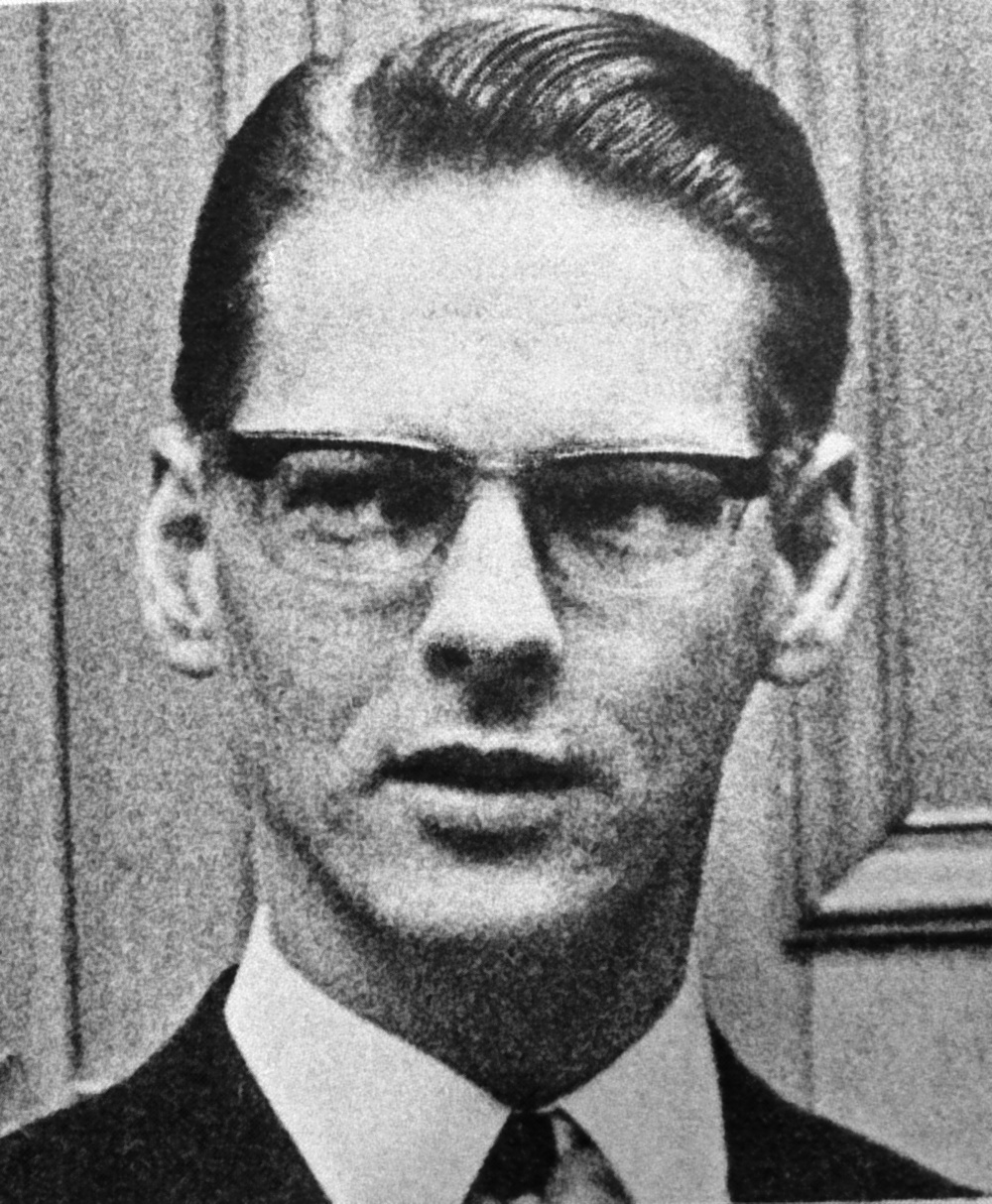

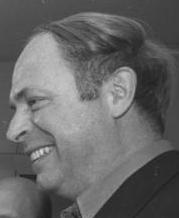
	First party	Second party	Third party
Leader	Olof Palme	Ulf Adelsohn	Thorbjörn Fälldin
Party	Social Democrats	Moderate	Centre
Last election	154	73	64
Seats won	166	86	56
Seat change	▲12	▲13	▼8
Popular vote	2,533,250	1,313,337	859,618
Percentage	45.61%	23.64%	15.48%
Swing	▲2.37 pp	▲3.30 pp	▼2.59 pp
	Fourth party	Fifth party
Leader	Ola Ullsten	Lars Werner
Party	People's Party	Left Communists
Last election	38	20
Seats won	21	20
Seat change	▼17	Steady
Popular vote	327,770	308,899
Percentage	5.90%	5.56%
Swing	▼4.69 pp	▼0.05 pp
- Map of the election, showing the distribution of constituency and levelling seats, as well as the largest political bloc within each constituency.
PM before election
Thorbjörn Fälldin
Centre
Elected PM
Olof Palme
Social Democrats

General elections were held in Sweden on 19 September 1982. They saw the return of the Swedish Social Democratic Party to power after six years in opposition, the longest period in opposition by the Social Democrats since the 1910s. The center-right coalition of Thorbjörn Fälldin had earlier suffered a loss upon the breakup of the government in 1981, the year before the election, when the rightist Moderate Party chose to withdraw from the government, protesting against the centrist tax policies of the Fälldin government. After regaining power, Social Democratic leader Olof Palme succeeded in being elected Prime Minister again, having earlier held power between 1969 and 1976.

The 2,533,250 votes for the Social Democrats is, in spite of a larger electorate, as of 2022 the highest number of people voting for a single party in Swedish electoral history, although the party had previously recorded higher percentage shares.

== Election campaign ==
The campaign running up to the 1982 elections can be characterized as orderly, with few unexpected problems and no scandals making it to the media. Similarly to previous elections, coverage focused heavily on party-leaders, with the debate between the Social Democratic leader Olof Palme, and the prime minister, Thorbjörn Fälldin televised in full length. However, grassroots activism played a more substantial role than before: parties engaged more in door-to-door canvassing, and candidates were more available to the public for 'street corner meetings'. Economic issues dominated the campaign, with all parties aiming to address the effects of the economic downturn and low growth in the country, partially caused by the oil crisis. It also became the dominant view that the further expansion of the public sector is not sustainable. While tensions where clearly visible within the governing parties, the main dividing line was clearly between the Social Democrats and the 'bourgeois bloc" (Moderate Party, People's Party and Centre Party). The latter (with the backing of the Swedish Employers' Confederation) focused their attack on the wage-earner funds proposal by the Social Democrats, stating that the implementation thereof would in effect destroy the market economy, and turn Sweden into a socialist society. Instead, their proposals contained contractionary policies, and reductions in public expenditure. The Social Democrats in turn blamed the economic hardships on the previous governments' incapability, criticized them for partly dismantling the traditional Swedish welfare system, and proposed expansion and new investments to revive the economy.

== Debates ==
1982 Swedish general election debates
Date	Time	Organizers	Moderators	P Present I Invitee N Non-invitee					
Date	Time	Organizers	Moderators	S	M	C	L	V	Refs
		Sveriges Television	Lars Orup [sv]	P Olof Palme, Kjell-Olof Feldt	P Ulf Adelsohn	P Thorbjörn Fälldin	P Ola Ullsten	P Lars Werner	

== Results ==
Party	Votes	%	Seats	+/–
Swedish Social Democratic Party	2,533,250	45.61	166	+12
Moderate Party	1,313,337	23.64	86	+13
Centre Party	859,618	15.48	56	−8
People's Party	327,770	5.90	21	−17
Left Party Communists	308,899	5.56	20	0
Christian Democratic Unity	103,820	1.87	0	0
Green Party	91,787	1.65	0	New
Workers Party Communists	5,745	0.10	0	0
Other parties	10,376	0.19	0	0
Total	5,554,602	100.00	349	0
Valid votes	5,554,602	99.07		
Invalid/blank votes	52,001	0.93		
Total votes	5,606,603	100.00		
Registered voters/turnout	6,130,993	91.45		
Source: Nohlen & Stöver

=== Seat distribution ===
Constituency	Total seats	Seats won						
Constituency	Total seats	By party					By coalition	
Constituency	Total seats	S	M	C	F	V	Left	Right
Älvsborg North	10	5	2	2	1		5	5
Älvsborg South	7	3	2	2			3	4
Blekinge	6	4	1	1			4	2
Bohus	10	4	3	2	1		4	6
Fyrstadskretsen	19	9	6	2	1	1	10	9
Gävleborg	12	7	2	2		1	8	4
Gothenburg	18	8	5	1	2	2	10	8
Gotland	2	1		1			1	1
Halland	10	4	3	2	1		4	6
Jämtland	5	3	1	1			3	2
Jönköping	13	6	3	3	1		6	7
Kalmar	9	5	2	2			5	4
Kopparberg	12	6	2	3		1	7	5
Kristianstad	11	5	3	2	1		5	6
Kronoberg	7	3	2	2			3	4
Malmöhus	13	6	4	2	1		6	7
Norrbotten	10	7	1	1		1	8	2
Örebro	12	6	2	2	1	1	7	5
Östergötland	17	8	4	3	1	1	9	8
Skaraborg	12	5	3	3	1		5	7
Södermanland	11	6	2	2	1		6	5
Stockholm County	34	14	12	3	2	3	17	17
Stockholm Municipality	31	12	11	2	2	4	16	15
Uppsala	11	5	2	2	1	1	6	5
Värmland	13	6	3	2	1	1	7	6
Västerbotten	10	5	1	2	1	1	6	4
Västernorrland	13	7	2	3		1	8	5
Västmanland	11	6	2	1	1	1	7	4
Total	349	166	86	56	21	20	186	163
Source: Statistics Sweden

=== By municipality ===
Votes by municipality. The municipalities are the color of the party that got the most votes within the coalition that won relative majority.

Cartogram of the map to the left with each municipality rescaled to the number of valid votes cast.

Map showing the voting shifts from the 1979 to the 1982 election. Darker blue indicates a municipality voted more towards the parties that formed the centre-right bloc. Darker red indicates a municipality voted more towards the parties that form the left-wing bloc.

Votes by municipality as a scale from red/Left-wing bloc to blue/Centre-right bloc.

Cartogram of vote with each municipality rescaled in proportion to number of valid votes cast. Deeper blue represents a relative majority for the centre-right coalition, brighter red represents a relative majority for the left-wing coalition.

=== After the election ===
A central economic issue surrounding the 1982 election was the Social Democratic Party’s proposed economic stabilization strategy, which combined a large currency devaluation with wage restraint and industrial competitiveness policies. Shortly after returning to office, the government of Olof Palme implemented a 16 percent devaluation of the Swedish krona, arguing that the measure was necessary to restore export competitiveness after years of declining industrial productivity. Economists described the policy as a shift from demand-side management toward a supply-side export-led strategy, aimed at reducing the persistent current-account deficits of the late 1970s and early 1980s. The devaluation formed part of a broader “Third Way” approach in which the state sought to promote industrial restructuring through cooperation between employers, unions, and the government, while avoiding severe cuts to the welfare state. Although the policy was controversial, especially among critics who argued that it risked fueling inflation, scholars note that it played a significant role in stabilizing export industries and shaping Sweden’s economic trajectory during the 1980s.
