= List of government ministries of Sweden =

This is a list of Swedish government ministries.

== Current ministries ==
Ministry	Formed	Employees (2024)	Total budget in SEK (2025)	Head	
Ministry	Formed	Employees (2024)	Total budget in SEK (2025)	Title	Titleholder
Climate and Enterprise (Klimat- och näringsdepartementet)	1 January 2023	346	466 million	Minister for Business and Industry Minister for the Environment	Ebba Busch Romina Pourmokhtari
Culture (Kulturdepartementet)	1 December 1991	105	133 million	Minister for Culture	Parisa Liljestrand
Defence (Försvarsdepartementet)	1 July 1920	245	357 million	Minister for Defence	Pål Jonson
Education and Research (Utbildningsdepartementet)	1 January 1968 (Note: The ministry was established on 16 May 1840 as the Ministry of Education and Ecclesiastical Affairs and changed its name to the Ministry of Education on 1 January 1968.)	217	264 million	Minister for Education Minister for Upper Secondary School, Higher Education and Research	Simona Mohamsson Lotta Edholm
Employment (Arbetsmarknadsdepartementet)	1 January 1974	170	213 million	Minister for Employment	Johan Britz
Finance (Finansdepartementet)	16 May 1840	554	694 million	Minister for Finance	Elisabeth Svantesson
Foreign Affairs (Utrikesdepartementet)	16 May 1840	1,284	3.342 billion	Minister for Foreign Affairs	Maria Malmer Stenergard
Health and Social Affairs (Socialdepartementet)	1 July 1920	333	426 million	Minister for Health and Social Affairs	Jakob Forssmed
Justice (Justitiedepartementet)	16 May 1840	387	492 million	Minister for Justice	Gunnar Strömmer
Rural Affairs and Infrastructure (Landsbygds- och infrastrukturdepartementet)	1 January 2023 (Note: The ministry has its origins in the Ministry for Rural Affairs (2011–2014) and the Ministry of Infrastructure (2019–2022).)	299	383 million	Minister for Rural Affairs Minister for Infrastructure and Housing	Peter Kullgren Andreas Carlson

== Former ministries ==
Ministry	Formed	Removed from Cabinet	Superseded and/or tasks taken over by	Last Cabinet-level head	
Ministry	Formed	Removed from Cabinet	Superseded and/or tasks taken over by	Title	Titleholder
Agriculture (Jordbruksdepartementet)	31 March 1900	31 December 2010	Ministry for Rural Affairs	Minister of Agriculture	Eskil Erlandsson
Budget (Budgetdepartementet)	25 November 1976	31 December 1982	Ministry of Finance	Minister for the Budget	Kjell-Olof Feldt
Civil Service Affairs (Civildepartementet)	16 May 1840 1 July 1950 1 January 1983	1 July 1920 31 December 1973 1 July 1996	Ministry of Social Affairs and the Ministry of Communications Ministry of Local Government Ministry of the Interior	Minister for Civil Service Affairs	Carl Svensson Hans Gustafsson Jörgen Andersson
Commerce and Industry (Handelsdepartementet)	1 July 1920	31 December 1982	Ministry for Foreign Affairs	Minister of Commerce and Industry	Lennart Bodström
Communications (Kommunikationsdepartementet)	1 July 1920	31 December 1998	Ministry of Enterprise and Innovation	Minister of Communications	Björn Rosengren
Economics (Ekonomidepartementet)	25 November 1976	31 December 1982	Ministry of Finance	Minister of Economics	Kjell-Olof Feldt
Education and Ecclesiastical Affairs (Ecklesiastikdepartementet)	16 May 1840	31 December 1967	Ministry of Education and Cultural Affairs	Minister of Education and Ecclesiastical Affairs	Olof Palme
Environment (Note: Has operated under different names: Ministry of the Environment and Energy (Miljö- och energidepartementet) (1987–1990, and 2015–2019); Ministry of the Environment (Miljödepartementet) (1990–1991, 1995–2004, 2007–2015, and 2019–2022); Ministry of the Environment and Natural Resources (Miljö- och naturresursdepartementet) (1991–1994); Ministry of the Environment and Community Development (Miljö- och samhällsbyggnadsdepartementet) (2005–2006)) (Miljödepartementet)	1 January 1987	31 December 2022	Ministry of Climate and Enterprise	Minister for the Environment	Annika Strandhäll
Housing (Bostadsdepartementet)	1 January 1974	30 November 1991	Six different ministries	Minister for Housing	Birgit Friggebo
Infrastructure (Infrastrukturdepartementet)	1 April 2019	31 December 2022	Ministry of Rural Affairs and Infrastructure	Minister for Infrastructure	Tomas Eneroth
Integration and Gender Equality (Integrations- och jämställdhetsdepartementet)	1 January 2007	31 December 2010	Ministry of Justice, Ministry of Education, and the Ministry of Employment	Minister for Integration and Gender Equality	Nyamko Sabuni
Ministry of the Interior (Inrikesdepartementet)	1 July 1947 1 July 1996	31 December 1973 31 December 1998	Ministry of Employment and the Ministry of Housing Several different ministries	Minister of the Interior	Ingemund Bengtsson Lars-Erik Lövdén (Note: Acting between 16 November 1998 to 31 December 1998.)
Land Defence (Lantförsvarsdepartementet)	16 May 1840	30 June 1920	Ministry of Defence	Minister of War	Per Albin Hansson
Local Government (Kommundepartementet)	1 January 1974	31 December 1982	Ministry for Civil Service Affairs	Minister for Physical Planning and Local Government	Bo Holmberg
Naval Affairs (Sjöförsvarsdepartementet)	16 May 1840	30 June 1920	Ministry of Defence	Minister for Naval Affairs	Bernhard Eriksson
Rural Affairs (Landsbygdsdepartementet)	1 January 2011	31 December 2014	Ministry of Enterprise and Innovation	Minister for Rural Affairs	Eskil Erlandsson
Supply (Folkhushållningsdepartementet)	15 October 1939	30 June 1950	Several different ministries	Minister of Supply	John Ericsson
