= Palme I cabinet =

First cabinet of Olof Palme

Olof Palme's First Cabinet
- 41st Cabinet of Sweden

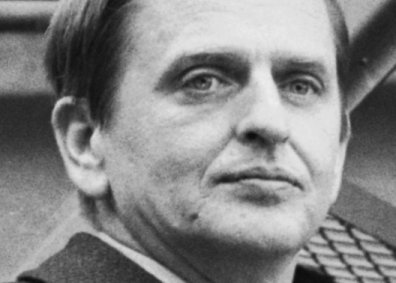
- Prime Minister Olof Palme
- Date formed: 14 October 1969
- Date dissolved: 8 October 1976

People and organisations
- Monarch: Gustaf VI Adolf (1969–1973); Carl XVI Gustaf (1973–1976)
- Prime Minister: Olof Palme
- Member party: Social Democrats
- Status in legislature: Single-party majority (upper & lower house; 1969–1970); Single-party minority (1970–1976) with flexible support from Left Party – the Communists
- Opposition parties: Centre Party; People's Party; Moderate Party; Left Party – the Communists (1969–1970)
- Opposition leader: Gunnar Hedlund (C; 1969–1971); Thorbjörn Fälldin (C; 1971–1976)

History
- Incoming formation: Resignation of Tage Erlander
- Outgoing formation: 1976 election
- Elections: 1970 election 1973 election 1976 election
- Legislature terms: 1969–1970; 1971–1973; 1974–1976
- Predecessor: Erlander III
- Successor: Fälldin I

The Palme I cabinet (Swedish: regeringen Palme I) was the government of Sweden from 14 October 1969 to 8 October 1976. It was a Social Democratic single-party government led by Prime Minister Olof Palme. During the reign of this cabinet, the Swedish bicameral parliament was abolished and replaced with the current unicameral one.

The cabinet was installed as incumbent Prime Minister Tage Erlander left the party chairmanship. It began as a majority government in both the upper and lower house after the Social Democrats received 50.1 percent of the votes in the 1968 general election. After the 1970 general election, the cabinet continued in the new unicameral parliament as a minority government with flexible support from the Left Party – the Communists. The cabinet resigned following a defeat in the 1976 general election and was succeeded by the centre-right Fälldin I cabinet.

Swedish politics during the reign of this cabinet was eventful. During this period, a wave of major strikes broke out and the IB affair, a covert domestic espionage program perpetrated by the state was uncovered. The Norrmalmstorg robbery and subsequent hostage situation took place in 1973, and two years later the West German Embassy siege occurred.

== Ministers ==
Portfolio	Minister	Took office	Left office	Party
Prime Minister's Office
Prime Minister	Olof Palme	14 October 1969	8 October 1976	Social Democrats
Ministry of Justice
Minister for Justice	Lennart Geijer	14 October 1969	8 October 1976	Social Democrats
Ministry of Foreign Affairs
Minister for Foreign Affairs	Torsten Nilsson	14 October 1969	30 June 1971	Social Democrats
Minister for Foreign Affairs	Krister Wickman	30 June 1971	3 November 1973	Social Democrats
Minister for Foreign Affairs	Sven Andersson	3 November 1973	8 October 1976	Social Democrats
Minister for International Development Cooperation	Gertrud Sigurdsen	3 November 1973	8 October 1976	Social Democrats
Minister for Disarmament and Religious Affairs	Alva Myrdal	14 October 1969	3 November 1973	Social Democrats
Ministry of Defence
Minister for Defence	Sven Andersson	14 October 1969	31 October 1973	Social Democrats
Minister for Defence	Eric Holmqvist	3 November 1973	8 October 1976	Social Democrats
Ministry of Health and Social Affairs
Minister for Health and Social Affairs	Sven Aspling	14 October 1969	3 November 1973	Social Democrats
Minister for Families, Youth and Immigrants	Camilla Odhnoff	14 October 1969	3 November 1973	Social Democrats
Ministry of Communications
Minister for Communications	Bengt Norling	14 October 1969	8 October 1976	Social Democrats
Ministry of Finance
Ministry for Finance	Gunnar Sträng	14 October 1969	8 October 1976	Social Democrats
Minister for Wages	Bertil Löfberg	14 October 1969	1 November 1975	Social Democrats
Minister for Wages and Nordic Cooperation	Kjell-Olof Feldt	1 November 1975	8 October 1976	Social Democrats
Ministry of Education
Minister for Education	Ingvar Carlsson	14 October 1969	3 November 1973	Social Democrats
Minister for Education	Bertil Zachrisson	3 November 1973	8 October 1976	Social Democrats
Minister for Teaching	Sven Moberg	14 October 1969	3 November 1973	Social Democrats
Minister for Schools	Lena Hjelm-Wallén	4 January 1974	8 October 1976	Social Democrats
Ministry of Agriculture
Minister for Agriculture	Ingemund Bengtsson	14 October 1969	3 November 1973	Social Democrats
Minister for Agriculture	Svante Lundkvist	3 November 1973	8 October 1976	Social Democrats
Ministry of Commerce and Industry
Minister of Commerce and Industry	Nils Gunnar Lange	14 October 1969	9 October 1970	Social Democrats
Minister of Commerce and Industry	Kjell-Olof Feldt	3 October 1970	1 November 1975	Social Democrats
Minister for Nordic Cooperation	Kjell-Olof Feldt	3 October 1970	1 November 1975	Social Democrats
Ministry of the Interior/Ministry of Employment
Minister of the Interior	Eric Holmquist	14 October 1969	3 November 1973	Social Democrats
Minister of the Interior	Ingemund Bengtsson	3 November 1973	31 December 1973	Social Democrats
Minister for Employment	Ingemund Bengtsson	1 January 1974	8 October 1976	Social Democrats
Minister for Immigrants and Equality	Anna-Greta Leijon	3 November 1973	8 October 1976	Social Democrats
Ministry of Housing
Minister for Housing	Ingvar Carlsson	3 November 1973	8 October 1976	Social Democrats
Ministry for Civil Service Affairs
Minister for Civil Service Affairs	Svante Lundkvist	14 October 1969	3 November 1973	Social Democrats
Minister for Civil Service Affairs	Hans Gustafsson	3 November 1973	31 December 1973	Social Democrats
Minister for Physical Planning and Local Government	Hans Gustafsson	1 January 1974	8 October 1976	Social Democrats
Minister for Religious Affairs	Hans Gustafsson	3 November 1973	8 October 1976	Social Democrats
Ministry of Industry
Minister for Industry	Krister Wickman	14 October 1969	30 June 1971	Social Democrats
Minister for Industry	Rune B. Johansson	30 June 1971	8 October 1976	Social Democrats

Preceded by Erlander III cabinet	Government of Sweden; 1969–1976	Succeeded by Fälldin I cabinet
