= Ministry of Local Government (Sweden) =

- Kommundepartementet

Ministry overview
- Formed: 1 January 1974
- Dissolved: 31 December 1982
- Superseding Ministry: Ministry for Civil Service Affairs
- Headquarters: Mynttorget 2, Stockholm, Sweden
- Minister responsible: Minister for Physical Planning and Local Government
- Parent agency: Government Offices (Note: Before 1 January 1975, the Government Offices was called the Royal Chancery.)

The Ministry of Local Government (Swedish: Kommundepartementet, Kn) was a ministry in Sweden established in 1974. The ministry was responsible for the county administrative boards, the municipalities, the tax charge offices, the local enforcement offices, etc., and later also questions regarding the Church of Sweden and other religious communities. The ministry was headed by the minister for physical planning and local government. The ministry ceased in 1982 and the Ministry for Civil Service Affairs took over its tasks.

== History ==
The Ministry of Local Government was created in 1974 and was a continuation of the Ministry for Civil Service Affairs that had existed since 1969. The ministry was responsible for the county administrative boards, the municipalities, the tax charge offices (skattemyndigheterna), the local enforcement offices (kronofogdemyndigheterna), etc. And later also questions regarding the Church of Sweden and other religious communities (from 1 July 1977). The head of the ministry was the minister for physical planning and local government. During the ministry's first year in 1974, the following officials sorted under the minister: one state secretary, one director general for administrative affairs (expeditionschef) and director general for legal affairs (rättschef) as well as a number of other officials for different fields; one senior administrative officer (byrådirektör) for Länsstyrelserna m. m. ("County Administrative Boards etc."), one deputy director (kansliråd) for Personalärenden ("Personnel Affairs"), one deputy director for Planerings- och budgetsekretariat ("Planning and Budget Secretariat") and one deputy director for Kommunerna ("The Municipalities"). Other officials included desk officer (departementssekreterare), information officer (informationssekreterare), senior registry clerk (registrator), officials with special assignments and a secretary to the cabinet minister.

In 1982, there was one state secretary, one director general for administrative affairs, one director general for legal affairs and a head of the legal secretariat and a number of officials for different fields; one director (departementsråd) in each of the Länsstyrelserna I : Budget m. m. (La) ("County Administrative Boards I: Budget, etc.") and the Länsstyrelserna II: Planering, personal m. m. (Lp) ("County Administrative Boards II: Planning, Personnel, etc."), five desk officers; one director and five desk officers in the Förhållandet stat—kommun, administrativ indelning (Ka) ("State-Municipality Relationship, Administrative Division"); one director and four desk officers in the Kommunal demokrati, folkrörelserna m. m. (Kd) ("Municipal Democracy, Popular Movements, etc."); one director, one adviser and three desk officers in the Kyrkan (Ky) ("The Church"); one head and two advisers in the Räddningstjänst m. m. (Rt) ("Emergency Services, etc."); one head and four advisers in the Rättssekretariatet (R) ("Legal Secretariat"); one director and three desk officers in the Planerings- och budgetsekretariatet (PBS)/Kommunernas och landstingskommunernas ekonomi ("The Planning and Budget Secretariat (PBS)/The Finances of Municipalities and County Councils"); as well as four other officials (director, information officer, senior registry clerk and a secretary to the cabinet minister).

The Ministry of Local Government ceased on 31 December 1982. On 1 January 1983, the Ministry for Civil Service Affairs took its place. Almost all duties were moved to the newly established Ministry for Civil Service Affairs from the Ministry of Local Government plus wages, staff and rationalization from the Ministry of the Budget.

== Central boards and agencies ==
In 1974, among other things, the following central boards and agencies (centrala ämbetsverk) belonged to the ministry: the National [Swedish] Fire Service Inspectorate (Statens brandinspektion), the National [Swedish] Fire Service College (Statens brandskola), the Organization Board of the [Swedish] County Administrations (Länsstyrelsernas organisationsnämnd) and the National [Swedish] Board for Municipal War Emergency Planning (Riksnämnden för kommunal beredskap). From 1975 to 1982, the following central boards and agencies belonged to the ministry: the National [Swedish] Fire Service Board (Statens brandnämnd), the Organization Board of the [Swedish] County Administrations and the National [Swedish] Board for Municipal War Emergency Planning.

== Location ==
From 1974 to 1982, the ministry was located in Kanslihuset at Mynttorget 2 in Stockholm.

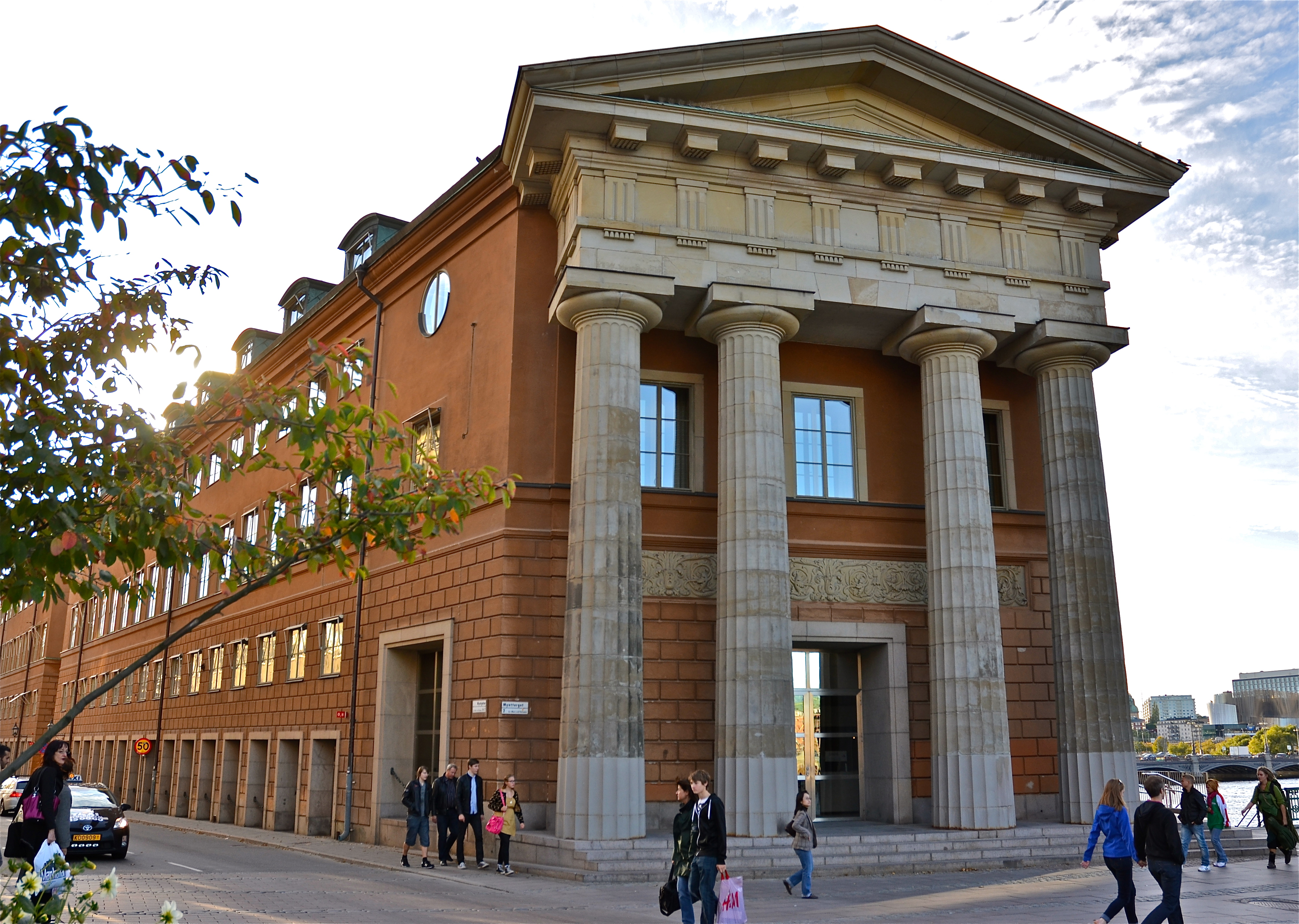
Mynttorget 2

== See also ==
- Minister for Physical Planning and Local Government
