= Ministry of Infrastructure (Sweden) =

- Infrastrukturdepartementet

Ministry overview
- Formed: 1 April 2019
- Dissolved: 31 December 2022
- Superseding Ministry: Ministry of Rural Affairs and Infrastructure
- Headquarters: Stockholm, Sweden
- Minister responsible: Minister for Infrastructure
- Parent agency: Government Offices

The Ministry of Infrastructure (Swedish: Infrastrukturdepartementet) was a ministry within the Government of Sweden. It operated between 2019 and 2022.

A new ministry under the name Ministry of Rural Affairs and Infrastructure was created on 1 January 2023.

== History ==
The Ministry of Infrastructure was formed on 1 April 2019 and took over some responsibilities previously handled by the Ministry of Enterprise and Innovation, the Ministry of Finance and the Ministry of the Environment.

The ministry was succeeded by the Ministry of Rural Affairs and Infrastructure on 1 January 2023 as the responsibilities carried out by the Ministry of Infrastructure was merged with those carried out by the Minister for Rural Affairs, then sorted under the Ministry of Enterprise.

== Government agencies ==
At the time of its closure, the Ministry was principal for the following government agencies:

- Authority for Digital Management
- Civil Aviation Administration
- Electrical Safety Authority
- Energy Market Inspectorate
- National Road and Transport Research Institute
- Oil Crisis Board
- State Energy Authority
- Svenska kraftnät
- Swedish Maritime Administration
- Swedish Post and Telecom Authority
- Swedish Transport Administration
- Swedish Transport Agency
- Trafikanalys
