= Ministry of Communications (Sweden) =

- Kommunikationsdepartementet

Communications ministry overview
- Formed: 1 July 1920
- Dissolved: 31 December 1998
- Superseding Communications ministry: Ministry of Enterprise and Innovation
- Headquarters: Stockholm, Sweden
- Minister responsible: Minister of Communications
- Parent agency: Government Offices (Note: Before 1 January 1975, the Government Offices was called the Royal Chancery.)

The Ministry of Communications (Transport) (Note: [Royal Swedish] Ministry of Communications (Transport); (British equivalent roughly) the Ministry of Transport; (American equivalent roughly) the Interstate Commerce Commission, (abbreviated) ICC; (for telework matters) the Federal Communications Commission, (abbreviated) FCC or [Royal Swedish] Ministry of Transport and Communications.) (Swedish: Kommunikationsdepartementet) was a ministry in Sweden, established in 1920 in connection with the division of the Ministry for Civil Service Affairs. The department dealt with administrative matters concerning, among other things, railways and tramways, post telegraph and telephone, canals, roads, bridges, ferries, air traffic, geotechnical, meteorological and hydrological surveys, radio broadcasting and electrical installations. The ministry was headed by the minister of communications (transport). In 1999, the ministry was replaced by the Ministry of Enterprise and Innovation.

== History ==
The Ministry of Communications was established in 1920 in connection with the division of the Ministry for Civil Service Affairs. The Ministry of Communications handles administrative matters concerning, among other things, railways and tramways, post telegraph and telephone, canals, roads, bridges, ferries, air traffic, geotechnical, meteorological and hydrological surveys, the radio service, electrical installations, state waterfalls, insofar as these matters do not belong to another department, development planning and the construction industry in general, government land and buildings in so far as such matters do not belong to another ministry. It also handles legislative matters regarding, among other things, the construction and maintenance of roads, traffic safety, radio and permits for or bans on air traffic over Swedish territory. Under the head of the ministry, who was colloquially known as the minister of communications (transport), was a state secretary as well as a director general for administrative affairs (expeditionschef) and a series of agencies headed by deputy directors (kansliråd) and in addition an agency for technical matters as well as first and second administrative officers (kanslisekreterare), first agency engineer (byråingenjör), registrar and amanuenses. The Ministry of Communications is one of the ministries that has a rapporteur in the Supreme Administrative Court of Sweden.

The Ministry of Communications included, among other things, the following central government agencies: the Swedish Post Office Board (Generalpoststyrelsen), the National Swedish Road Board (Väg- och vattenbyggnadsstyrelsen), the National Board of Public Building (Byggnadsstyrelsen), the National Swedish Board of Telecommunications Services (Telegrafstyrelsen), the National Swedish Railway Board (Järnvägsstyrelsen), the River Regulation Division and the Civil Aviation Administration.

In 1999, the "grand ministry" of the Ministry of Enterprise and Innovation was created through a merger of the Ministry of Communications, the Ministry of Employment and the Ministry of Enterprise and Innovation and parts of the Ministry of the Interior (which ceased at the same time).

== Location ==
Until 1973, the ministry was located in Kanslihuset at Mynttorget 2 in Stockholm. From 1974 to 1994, the ministry was located at Vasagatan 8-10. From 1995, the ministry was located in Departementets hus at Jakobsgatan 26.

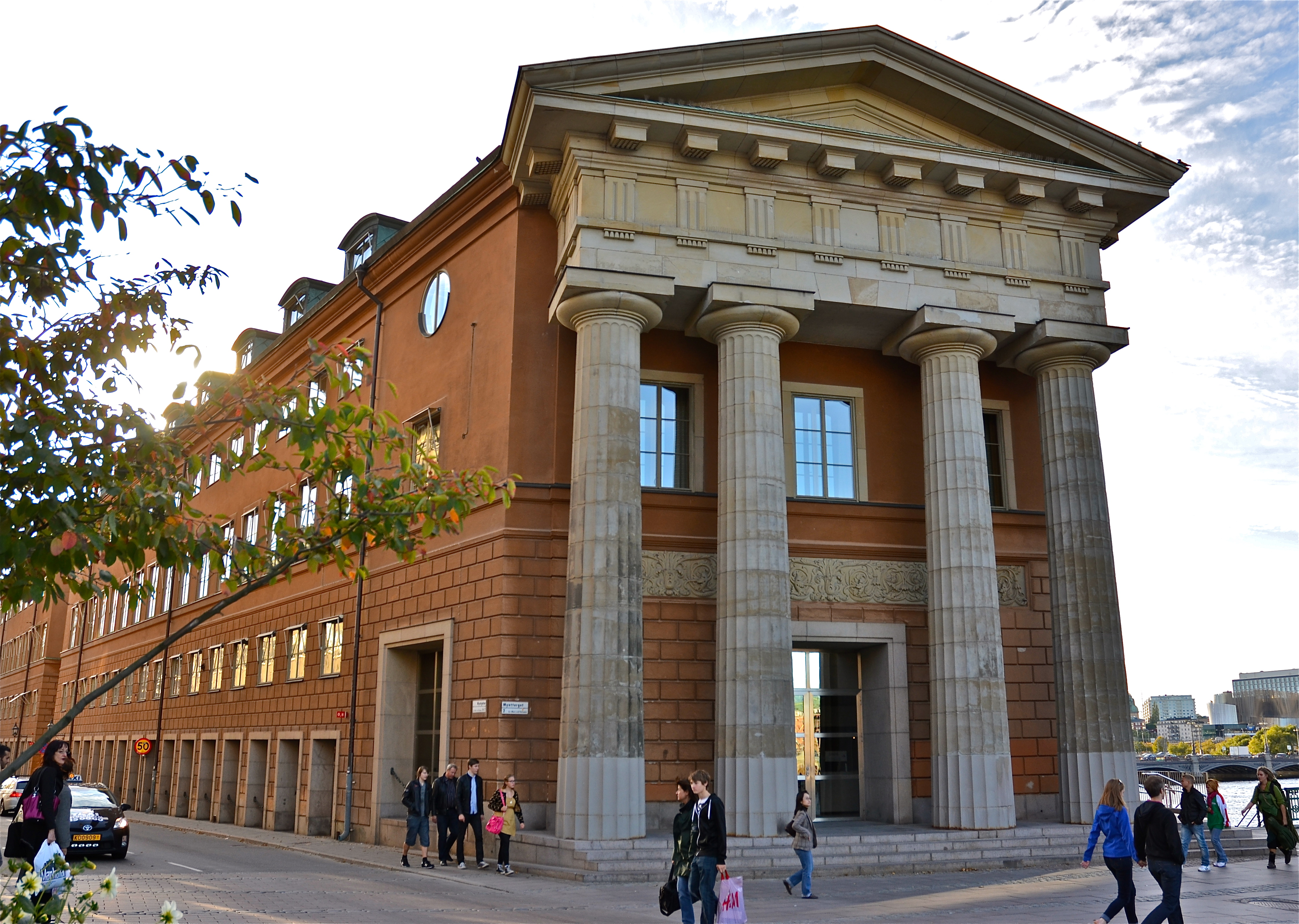
Mynttorget 2

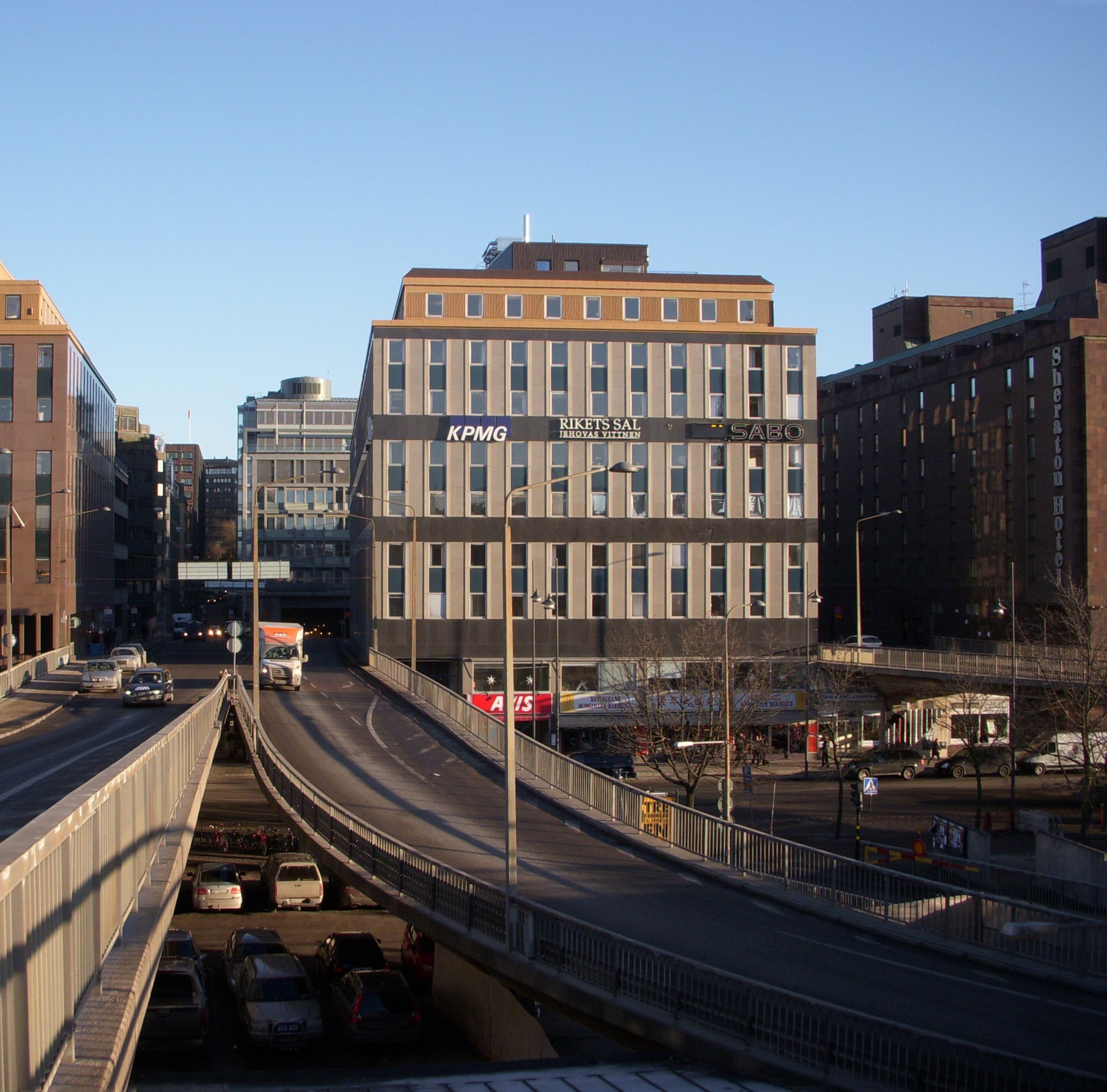
Vasagatan 8-10

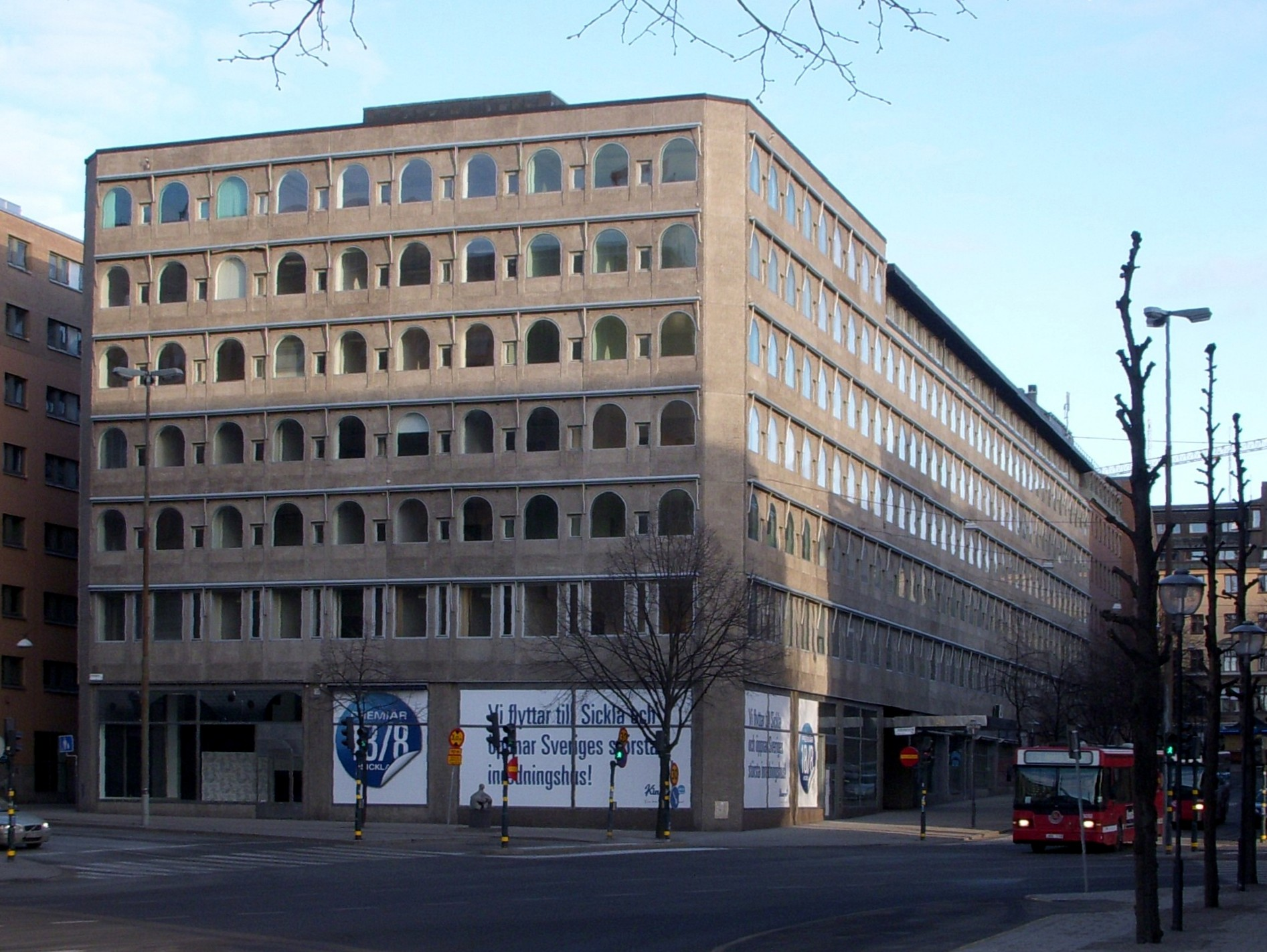
Jakobsgatan 26

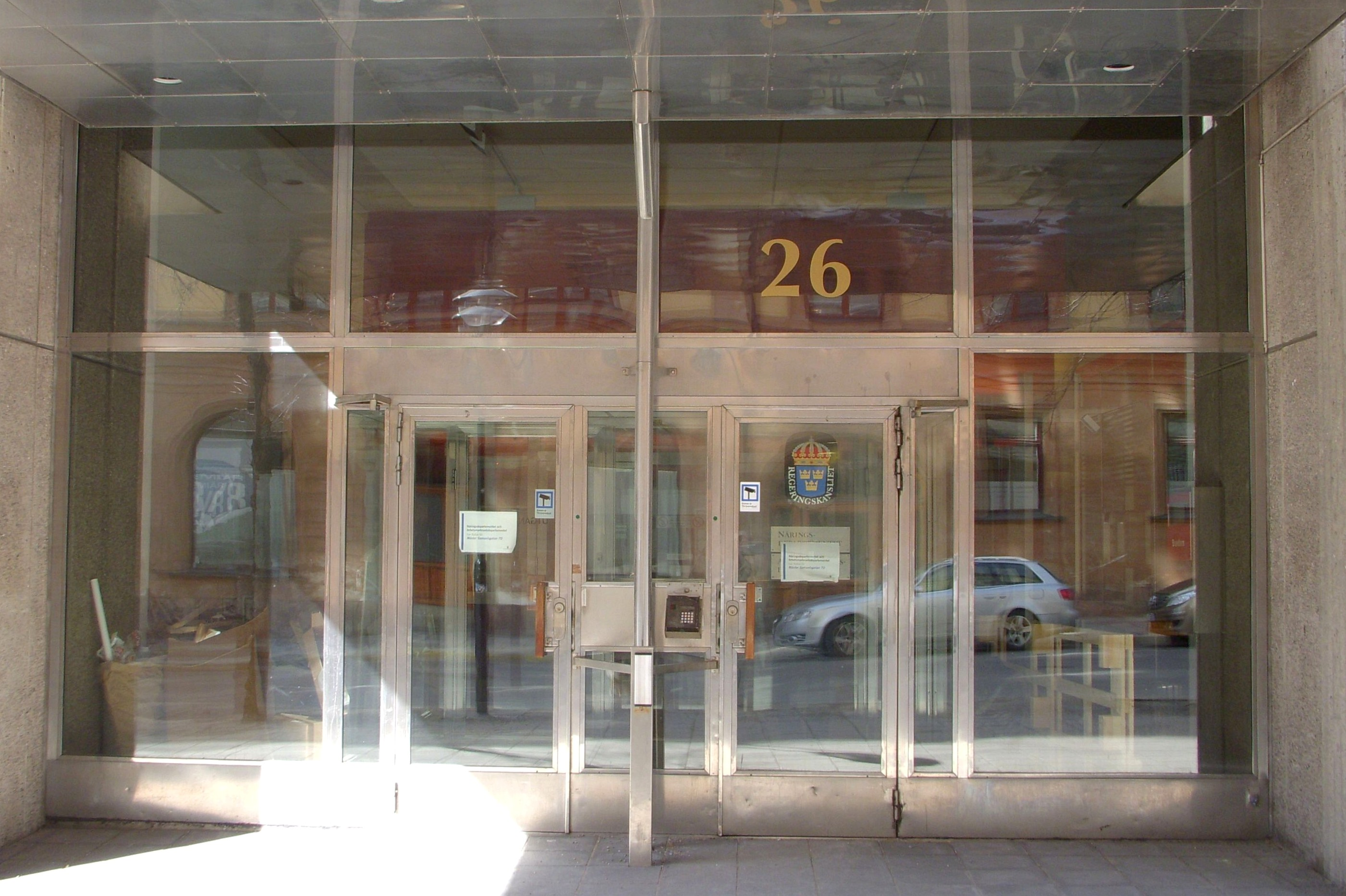
Entrance to Jakobsgatan 26
