= Minister for Physical Planning and Local Government =

Minister for Physical Planning and Local Government of Sweden
- Kommunminister
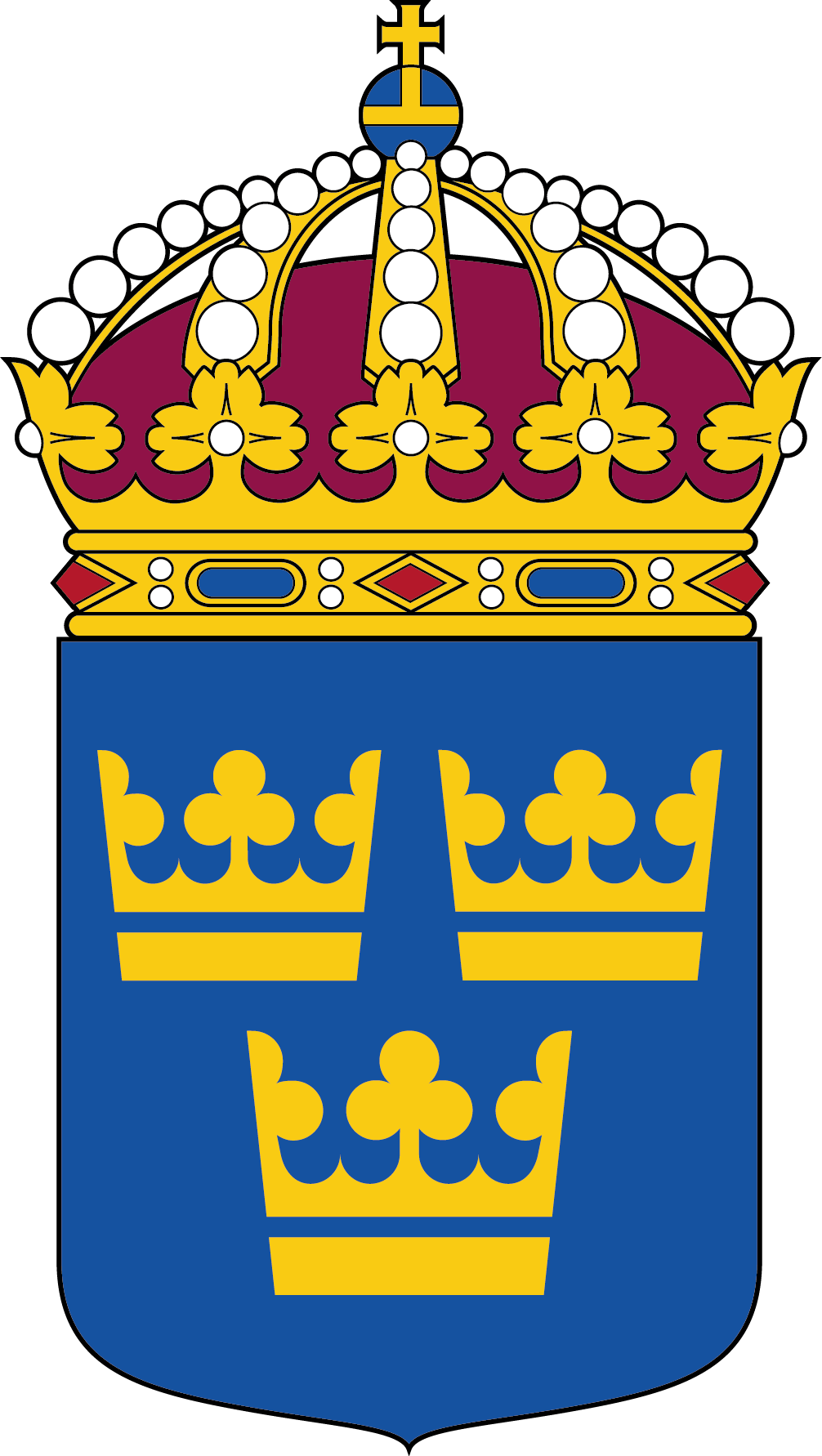
- Lesser coat of arms of Sweden
- Ministry of Local Government
- Appointer: The Prime Minister
- Term length: No fixed term Serves as long as the Prime Minister sees fit
- Formation: 1 January 1974
- First holder: Hans Gustafsson
- Final holder: Bo Holmberg
- Abolished: 31 December 1982

The Minister for Physical Planning and Local Government (Swedish: Kommunminister) was a member of the government of Sweden. The minister for physical planning and local government was the head of the Ministry of Local Government from 1974 to 1982 which was responsible for the county administrative boards, the municipalities, the tax charge offices, the local enforcement offices, etc., and later also questions regarding the Church of Sweden and other religious communities.

== History ==
The post of minister for physical planning and local government was created in connection with the establishment of the Ministry of Local Government in 1974. The minister and his ministry were responsible for the county administrative boards, the municipalities, the tax charge offices (skattemyndigheterna), the local enforcement offices (kronofogdemyndigheterna), etc., and later also questions regarding the Church of Sweden and other religious communities (from 1 July 1977). Hans Gustafsson, social democratic city manager in Ronneby, became the first minister for physical planning and local government in Olof Palme's First Cabinet. He had experience from both the municipality and the county council, starting as a bookbinder who via Brunnsvik and the South Swedish School of Social Work and Public Administration (Sydsvenska socialinstitutet) in Lund became a municipal accountant and municipal director (kommunaldirektör). He was also district chairman in Blekinge. After the 1976 Swedish general election, Johannes Antonsson became minister in the Fälldin's First Cabinet after he declined the post as foreign minister.

In 1978, the municipal commissioner (kommunalråd) from Gothenburg, Bertil Hansson became minister in the Ullsten Cabinet. The cabinet resigned on 12 October 1979 following the 1979 general election to make way for a coalition majority government led by Thorbjörn Fälldin. Karl Boo, vice chairman of the Swedish Association of Local Authorities (Svenska Kommunförbundet), and member of the Avesta municipal council and municipal board, became minister in Thorbjörn Fälldin's Second Cabinet. After the 1982 Swedish general election, Bo Holmberg became minister for civil service affairs in Palme's Second Cabinet with responsibility for, among other things, municipal issues. The Ministry of Local Government ceased on 31 December 1982 and its tasks were taken over by the Ministry for Civil Service Affairs and thus the post of minister for physical planning and local government disappeared.

== List of officeholders ==
Color key

Independent
Historical parties: Lantmanna Moderate National Party Liberals Liberals Liberals Liberals
Present parties: Social Democrats Moderate Centre Left Liberals Christian Democrats Green Sweden Democrats

=== 1976–1982 ===
Portrait	Minister (Born-Died)	Term			Political Party	Coalition	Cabinet
Portrait	Minister (Born-Died)	Took office	Left office	Duration	Political Party	Coalition	Cabinet
Hans Gustafsson	Hans Gustafsson (1923–1998)	1 January 1974	8 October 1976	2 years, 281 days	Social Democrats	–	Palme I
Johannes Antonsson	Johannes Antonsson (1921–1995)	8 October 1976	18 October 1978	2 years, 10 days	Centre	C–M–L	Fälldin I
Bertil Hansson	Bertil Hansson (1918–2013)	18 October 1978	12 October 1979	359 days	Liberals	–	Ullsten
Karl Boo	Karl Boo (1918–1996)	12 October 1979	8 October 1982	2 years, 361 days	Centre	C–M–L	Fälldin II; Fälldin III
Bo Holmberg	Bo Holmberg (1942–2010)	8 October 1982	31 December 1982	84 days	Social Democrats	–	Palme II
