= Minister for Public Administration =

Minister for Public Administration may refer to:

- Minister for Public Administration (Italy)
- Minister for Public Administration (Sweden)
