= Ministry for Civil Service Affairs =

- Civildepartementet
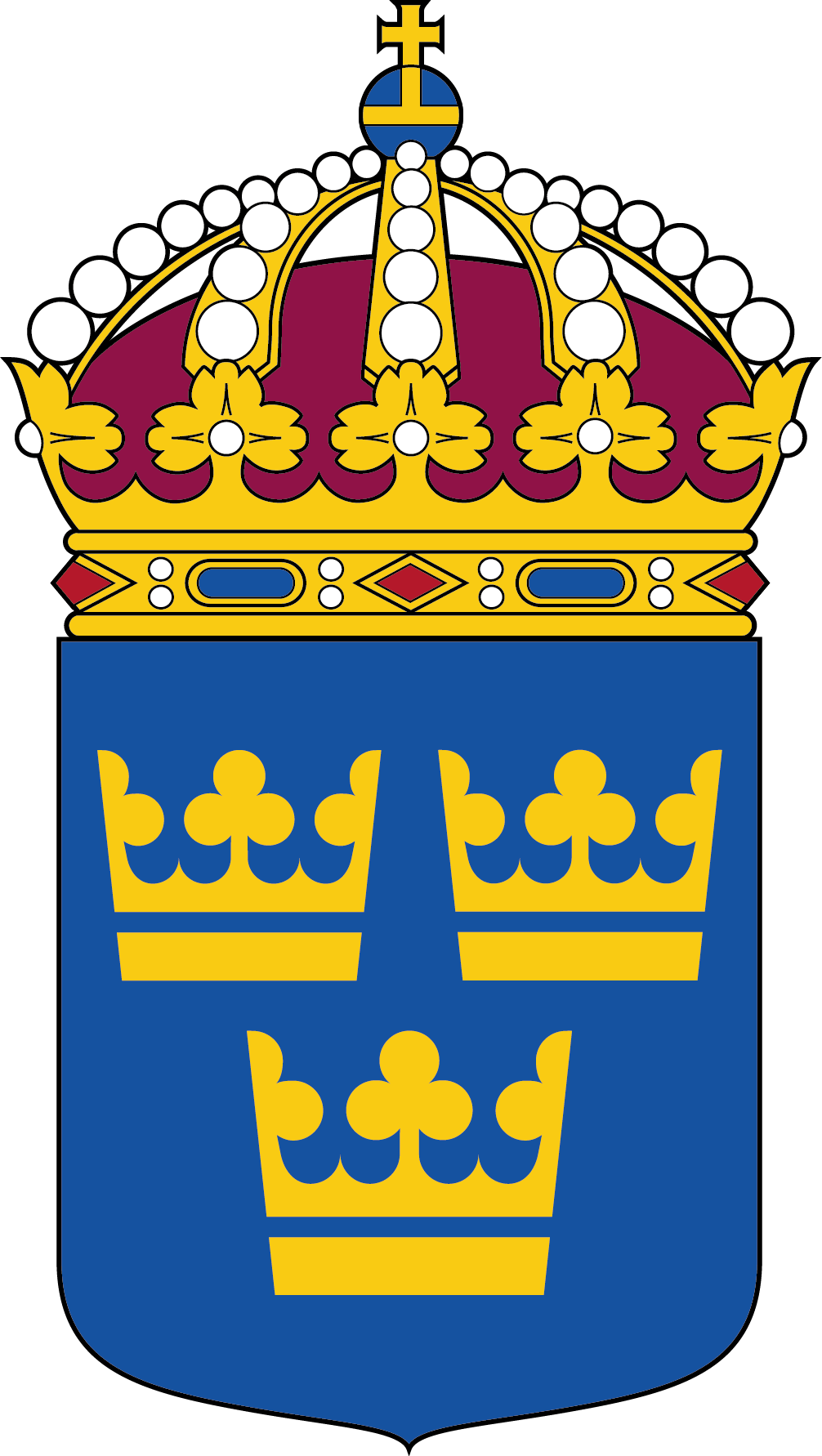

Agency overview
- Formed: 1840 (first time); 1950 (second time); 1983 (third time)
- Dissolved: 1920 (first time); 1969 (second time); 1996 (third time)
- Superseding agencies: Ministry of Social Affairs (1920); Ministry of Communications (1920); Ministry of Local Government (1969); Ministry of the Interior (1996)
- Headquarters: Stockholm, Sweden
- Minister responsible: Minister for Civil Service Affairs
- Parent agency: Government Offices (Note: Before 1 January 1975, the Government Offices was called the Royal Chancery.)

The Ministry for Civil Service Affairs (Note: Ministry for Civil Service Affairs or Ministry of Physical Planning and Local Government.) (Swedish: Civildepartementet) was a ministry in Sweden, established through the 1840 ministerial reform. The ministry and its most important areas of responsibility were agriculture, bergsrörelse, trade, shipping, factories, crafts and other industries, public roads and other communications. The ministry was headed by the minister for civil service affairs. In 1920, the Ministry for Civil Service Affairs was replaced by two ministries: the Ministry of Social Affairs and the Ministry of Communications (Transport). The Ministry for Civil Service Affairs was re-established in 1950 and then handled the wage and pension system until 1969 when it became the Ministry of Local Government. In 1983, the Ministry for Civil Service Affairs was re-established and operated until 1996, when the Ministry for Civil Service Affairs was transformed into the Ministry of Internal Affairs which was disestablished two years later.

== History ==
The Ministry for Civil Service Affairs was one of seven ministries that were established through the 1840 ministerial reform. The others were the Ministry of Justice, the Ministry for Foreign Affairs, the Ministry of Land Defence, the Ministry for Naval Affairs, the Ministry of Finance and the Ministry of Ecclesiastical Affairs. In 1900, an eighth ministry was added: the Ministry of Agriculture. Through the Ministry for Civil Service Affairs, matters concerning the lantregeringen (county administrative boards) as well as rural municipalities, köping's and cities were prepared and presented – in accordance with the Royal Statute of 31 March 1900 and Royal Proclamation of 30 January 1903. Other matters were communications (excluding road, ferry and bridge maintenance issues), in particular rail and postal services, telegraphs, telephones and other electrical installations, road, waterway and port facilities, medical and quarantine services, public health as well as civilian health care institutions, concerning the insurance and health insurance system as well as other social issues, concerning flammable oils and explosive goods and suchlike, concerning the borders of Sweden and the special status of the Laplanders, and finally in general all civil matters not assigned to another ministry.

Among actual legal issues, the Ministry for Civil Service Affairs' handling included issues concerning the establishment, repeal, amendment or declaration of municipal statutes (except those relating to the church or education system) as well as legislative issues concerning insurance institutions and health insurance funds as well as compensation for occupational injuries. The cases were presented before the King by the head of the ministry, who was a cabinet minister and had the title "Minister and Head of the Ministry for Civil Service Affairs", but in everyday speech was usually called the minister for civil service affairs. For the preparation and handling of cases, the minister had at his disposal an office, which in 1906 consisted of a director general for administrative affairs (expeditionschef), four directors (byråchef) (deputy directors, kansliråd), five administrative officers (kanslisekreterare), a senior registry clerk, an advisor assistant in the preparation of insurance matters and a number of extra ordinary officials.

Under the Ministry for Civil Service Affairs were the following central government offices: the Swedish Post Office Board (Generalpoststyrelsen), the National Swedish Board of Health, the National Swedish Road Board (Väg- och vattenbyggnadsstyrelsen), the National Swedish Board of Telecommunications Services (Telegrafstyrelsen), the National Swedish Railway Board (Järnvägsstyrelsen), the National Swedish Insurance Office (Riksförsäkringsanstalten) and the National Swedish Private Insurance Inspectorate (Försäkringsinspektionen). Sorting under this ministry was also: the King in Council's commanding officer (Note: Refers to the highest administrative authority in a county (in Stockholm the Office of the Governor of Stockholm; in Finland a governorate).) in addition to landsstaten, the city administrations, government offices and officials, who did not hold judicial positions, the postal service, the medical service, the quarantine service, the staff of the road and waterway construction districts and the Road and Waterway Construction Service Corps, the telegraph service, the railway service, the executive boards for canals and port works, the public insurance institutions and more. The number of people who were employed in the Ministry for Civil Service Affairs with associated government offices and institutions at the beginning of the 20th century amounted to about 35,000. Most of the matters belonging to the Ministry for Civil Service Affairs were presented, before the introduction of the ministerial reform (1840), by the State Secretary at the then Kammarexpeditionen; some of the cases were presented by the State Secretary at the Trade and Finance Office (Handels- och finansexpeditionen).

In 1920, the Ministry for Civil Service Affairs was replaced by two ministries: the Ministry of Social Affairs and the Ministry of Communications (Transport). In 1950, the Ministry for Civil Service Affairs was re-established for the wage and pension system. In 1969, the Ministry for Civil Service Affairs was completely emptied of its old contents and would instead be responsible for the county administrative boards, the municipalities and the national physical planning and then went by the name Ministry of Physical Planning and Local Government. In 1974, the name was changed to the Ministry of Local Government which then ceased on 31 December 1982. On 1 January 1983, the Ministry for Civil Service Affairs came in its place as a pure ministry for issues concerning the public sector, for example for issues of working and employment conditions, co-determination and gender equality, Sweden's administrative division, rationalization and audit in central government, computer technology in public administration, statistics, public information, co-determination issues but also administrative matters concerning the Royal Court and Palace Administration (Slottsstaten). In June 1996, the Ministry for Civil Service Affairs was reorganized into the Ministry of the Interior.

== Location ==
In 1983, when the ministry was re-established, it was located at Tysta Marigången 2 and at Rödbodgatan 6 at Norrmalm in Stockholm. By 1984 it had moved across the street to Tegelbacken 2. In 1992, the ministry moved a couple blocks to Fredsgatan 8.

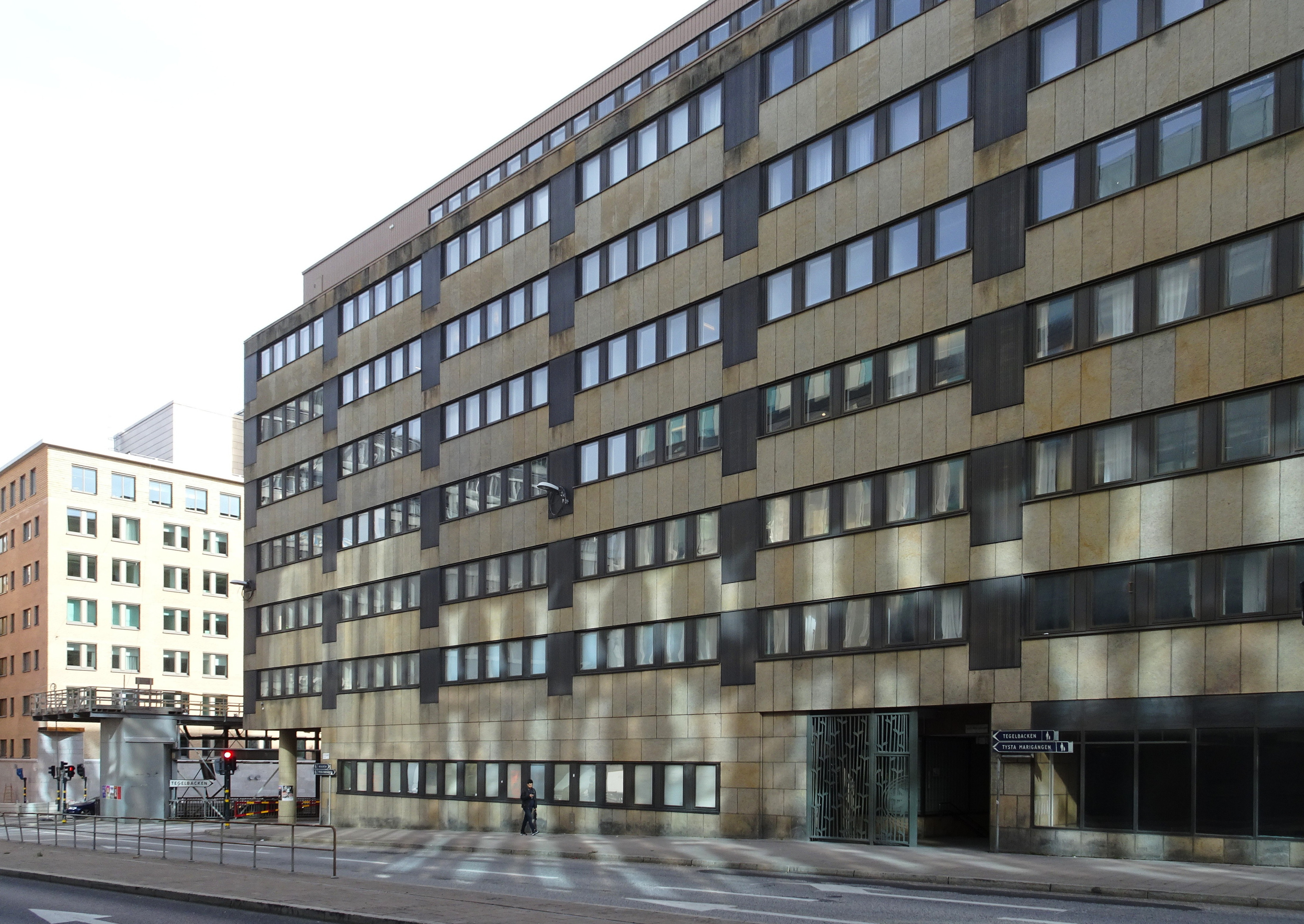
Entrance to Tysta Marigången

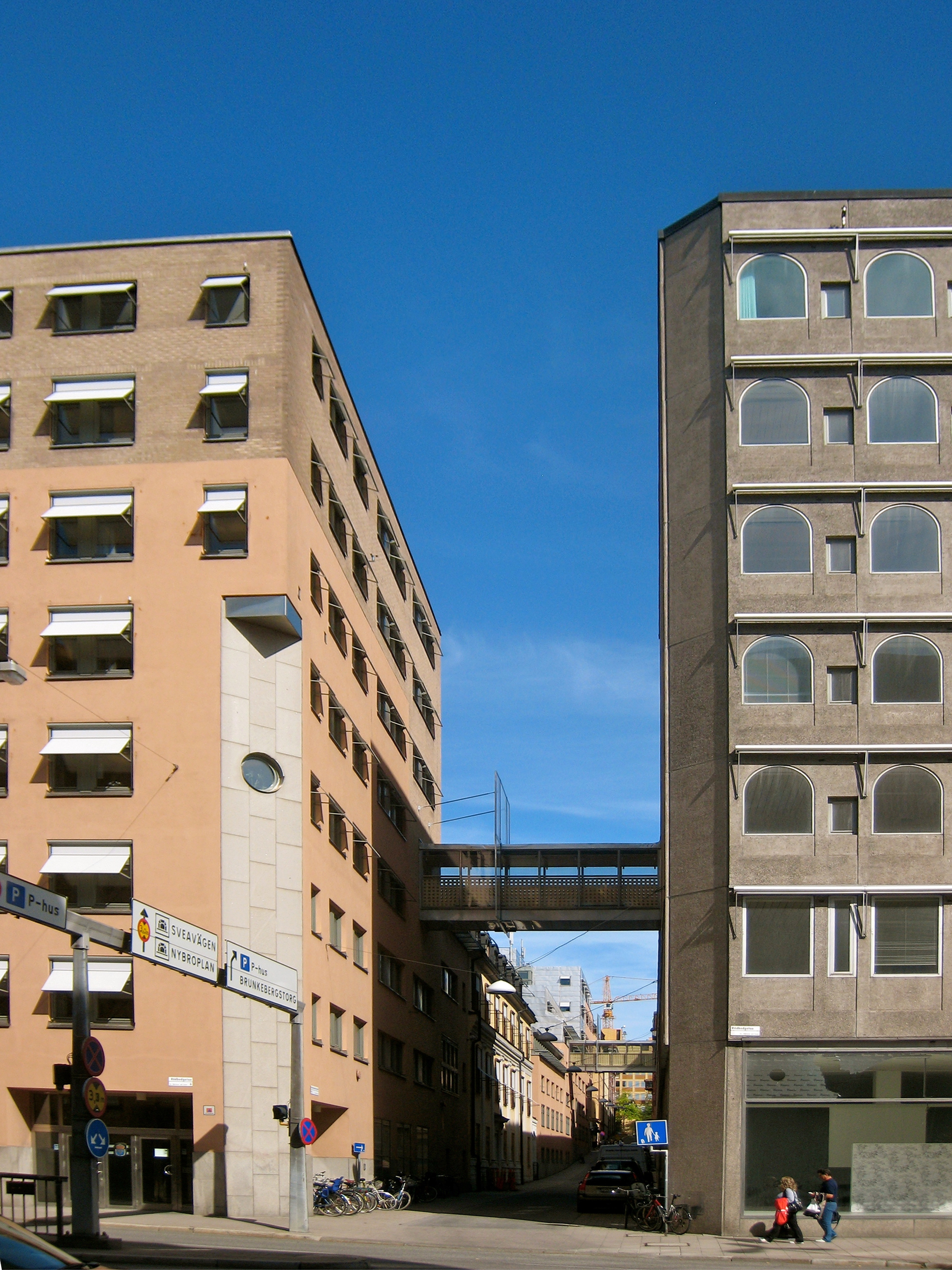
Rödbodgatan 6 (left)

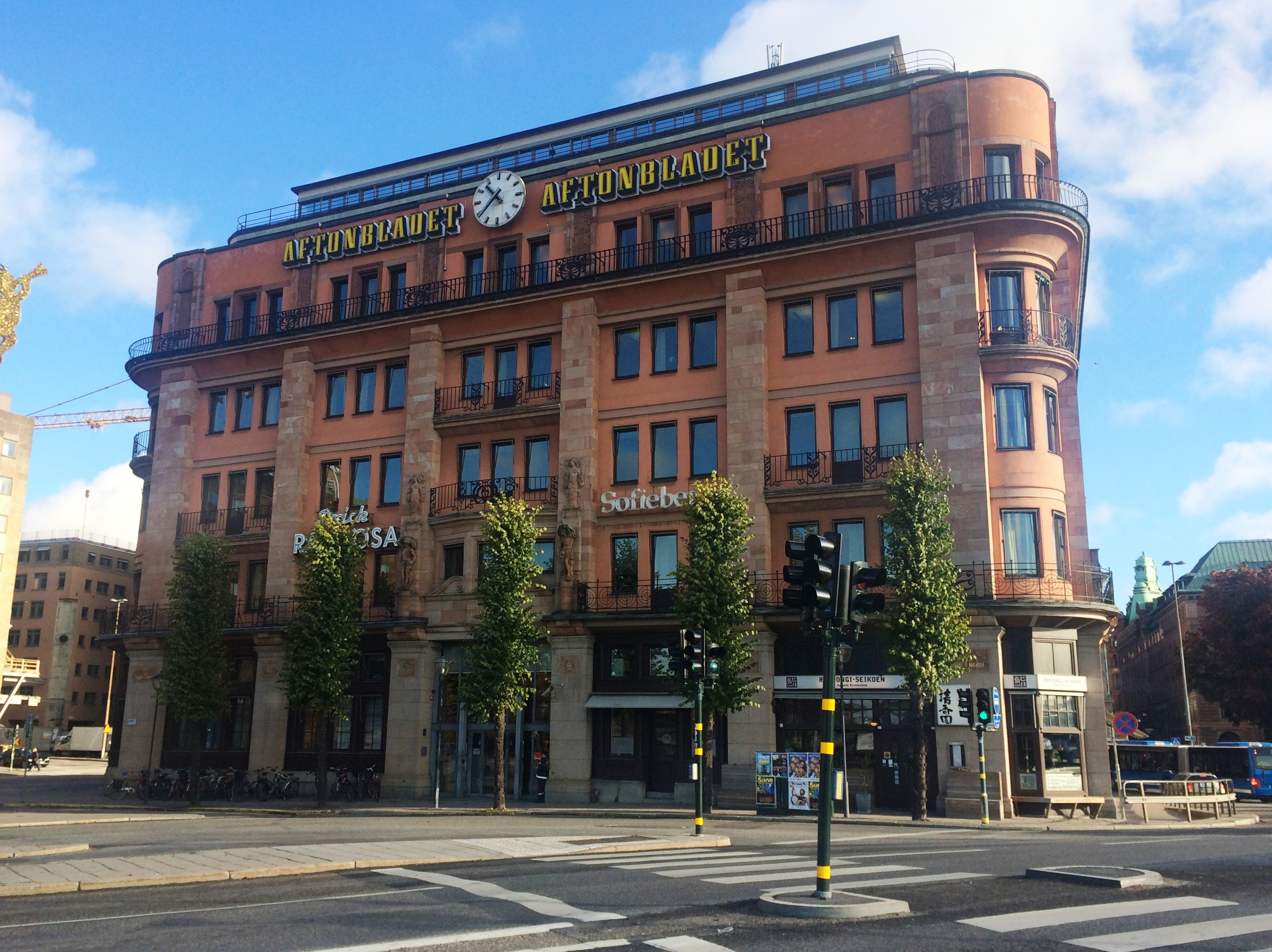
Tegelbacken 2

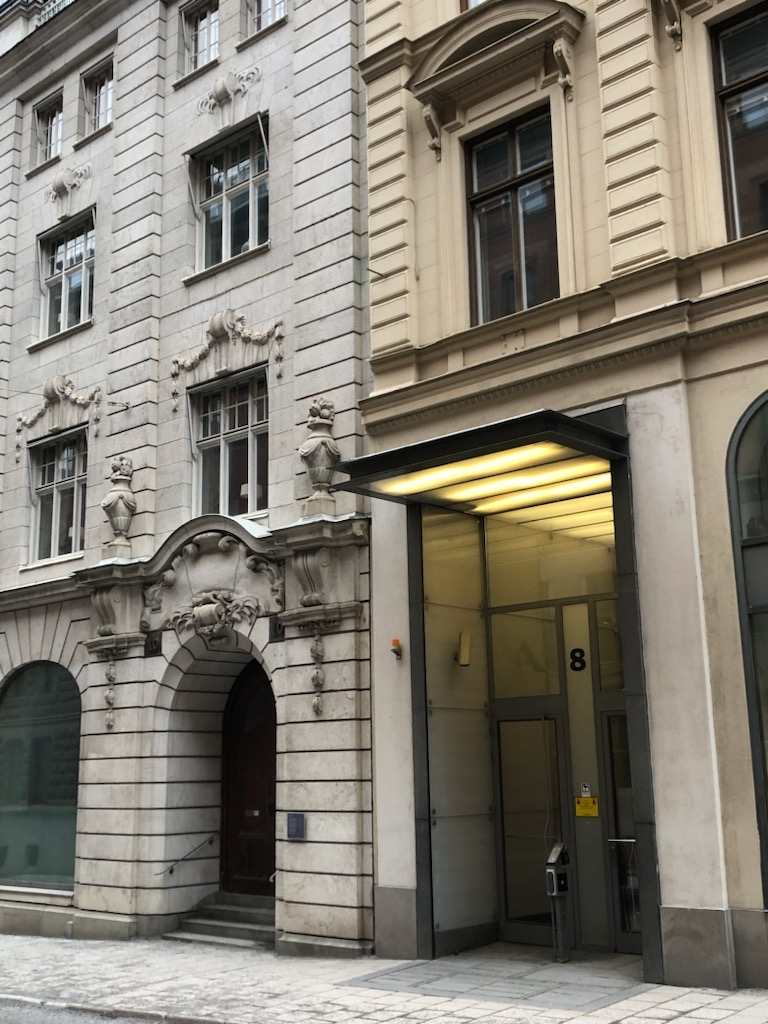
Fredsgatan 8

== See also ==
- Minister for Civil Service Affairs
