= Ministry of Housing (Sweden) =

- Bostadsdepartementet

Housing ministry overview
- Formed: 1 January 1974
- Dissolved: 30 November 1991
- Superseding Housing ministry: Six different ministries
- Headquarters: Stockholm, Sweden
- Minister responsible: Minister for Housing
- Parent agency: Government Offices (Note: Before 1 January 1975, the Government Offices was called the Royal Chancery.)

The Ministry of Housing [and Local Government] (Swedish: Bostadsdepartementet, Bo (Note: The abbreviation was initially B and was later changed to Bo.)) was a ministry in Sweden established in 1974. The department dealt with matters concerning housing policy: housing supplement for families with children, the housing system, rent regulation and planning and building issues including physical national planning. The ministry was headed by the minister of housing [and local government]. The ministry ceased after the 1991 Swedish general election.

== History ==
At the end of 1973, the Ministry of the Interior caesed and its tasks were taken over by other ministries, such as the Ministry of Labor and the Ministry of Housing, which was established on 1 January 1974. The ministry's most important issues had to do with housing policy: housing supplement for families with children, the housing system, rent regulation and planning and building issues including physical national planning.

When it was formed in 1974, the department consisted, in addition to the minister, of a state secretary, director general for administrative affairs (expeditionschef), director-general for legal affairs (rättschef) and heads of subject areas; a deputy director-general (departementsråd) for housing, a deputy director-general for physical national planning, a deputy director (kansliråd) for planning and building matters, and a deputy director for land and geographical surveying matters. Other officials consisted of a deputy director at the International Secretariat, government law secretaries (regeringsrättssekreterare), desk officers (departementssekreterare), information secretaries, registrars and officials with special assignments. In 1991, the ministry consisted of the following units and secretariats: the Housing Unit (Bostadsenheten), the Planning Unit (Planenheten), the Rent and Property Unit (Hyres- och fastighetsenheten), the Planning and Budget Secretariat (Planerings- och budgetsekretariatet), the International Secretariat (Internationella sekretariatet) and the Legal Secretariat (Rättssekretariatet).

In 1974, the following central boards and agencies (centrala ämbetsverk) belonged to the ministry: the National Swedish Housing Board (Bostadsstyrelsen), the Swedish Council for Building Research (Statens råd för byggnadsforskning), the National Swedish Institute for Building Research (Statens institut för byggnadsforskning), the National Swedish Rent Tribunal (Statens hyresråd), the National Swedish Board of Physical Planning and Building (Statens planverk), the National Swedish Water Supply and Sewage Tribunal (Statens va-nämnd), the National Swedish Land Survey Board, Geographical Survey Office of Sweden (Rikets allmänna kartverk) and the Geographical Survey Commission (Kartverkskommissionen).

In 1991, the following central boards and agencies belonged to the ministry: the Swedish Central Board for Real Property Data (Centralnämnden för fastighetsdata), the Fund for Humidity and Mould Damage (Fonden för fukt- och mögelskador), Lantmäteriet, the Regional Housing Committees (Länsbostadsnämnderna), the Swedish Urban Environment Council (Stadsmiljörådet), the National Swedish Institute for Building Research (Statens institut för byggnadsforskning), the National Swedish Land Survey Administration (Statens lantmäteriverk), the Swedish Council for Building Research (Statens råd för byggnadsforskning) and the National Swedish Water Supply and Sewage Tribunal (Statens va-nämnd).

The ministry ceased on 30 November 1991. When the ministry ceased, its tasks were distributed among six different ministries.

== Location ==
During its entire existence from 1974 to 1991, the ministry was located in Departementets hus at Jakobsgatan 26 in Stockholm.

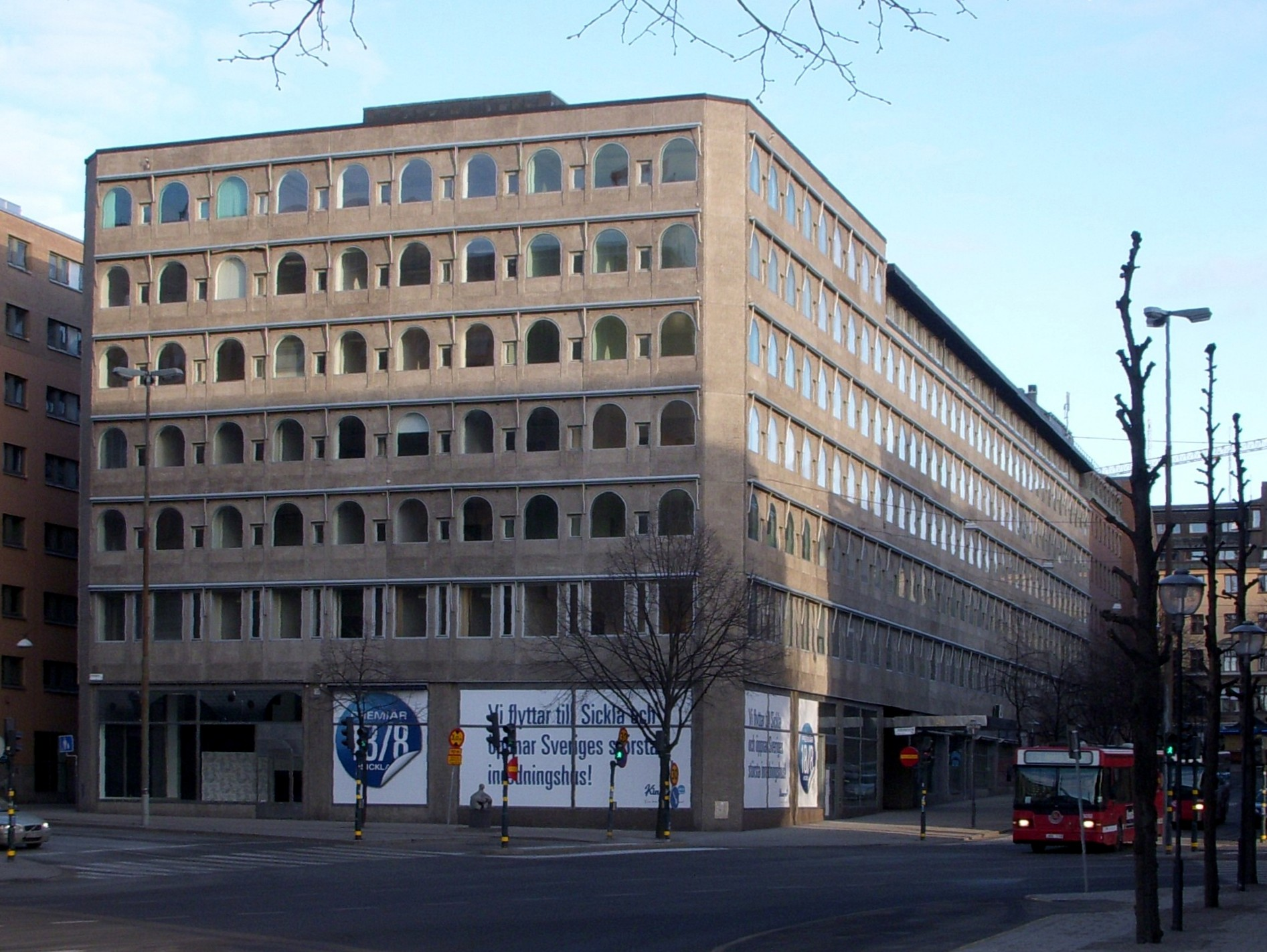
Jakobsgatan 26

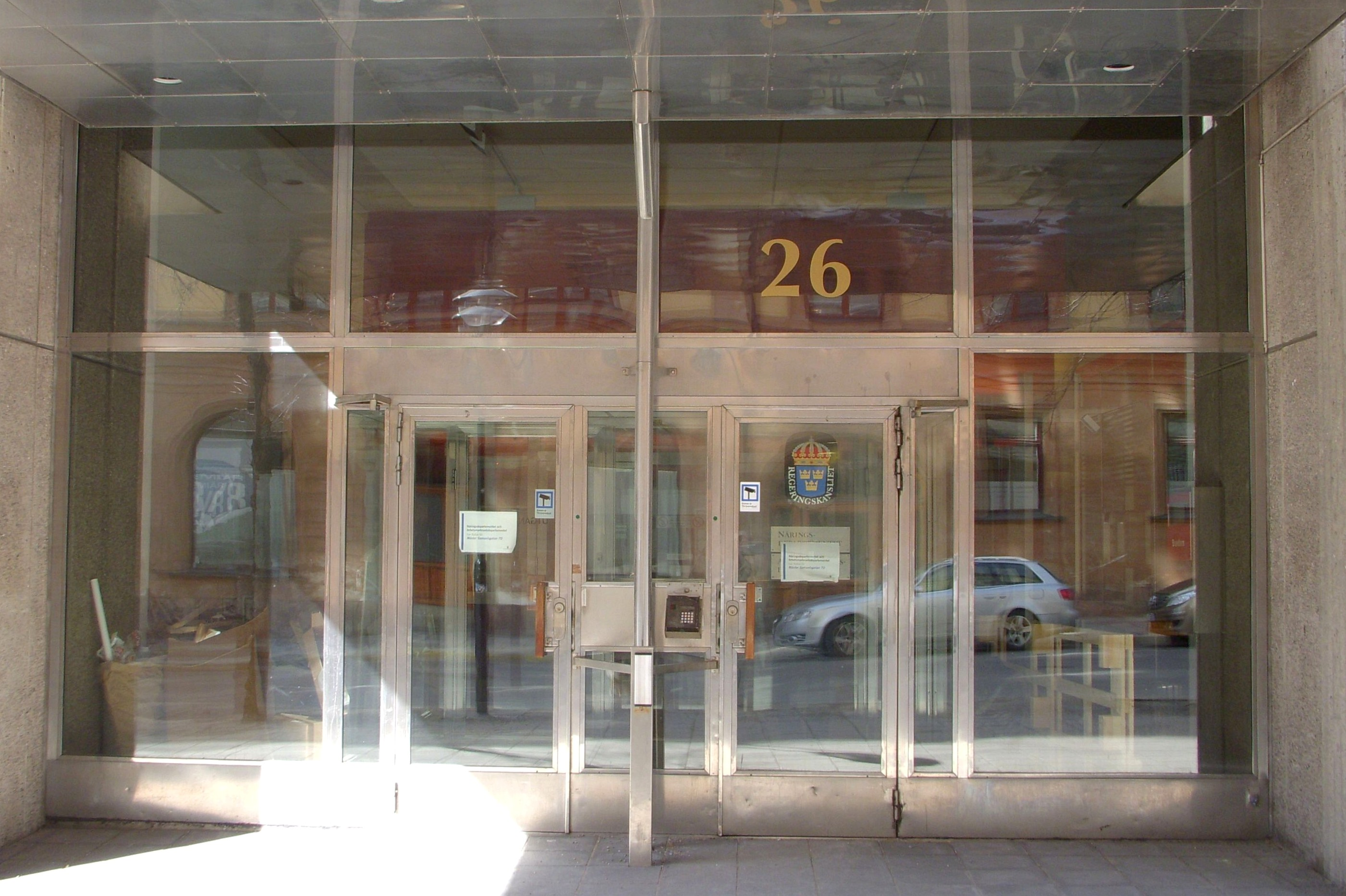
Entrance to Jakobsgatan 26

== See also ==
- Minister for Housing
