= Hans Gustafsson =

Swedish politician (1923–1998)

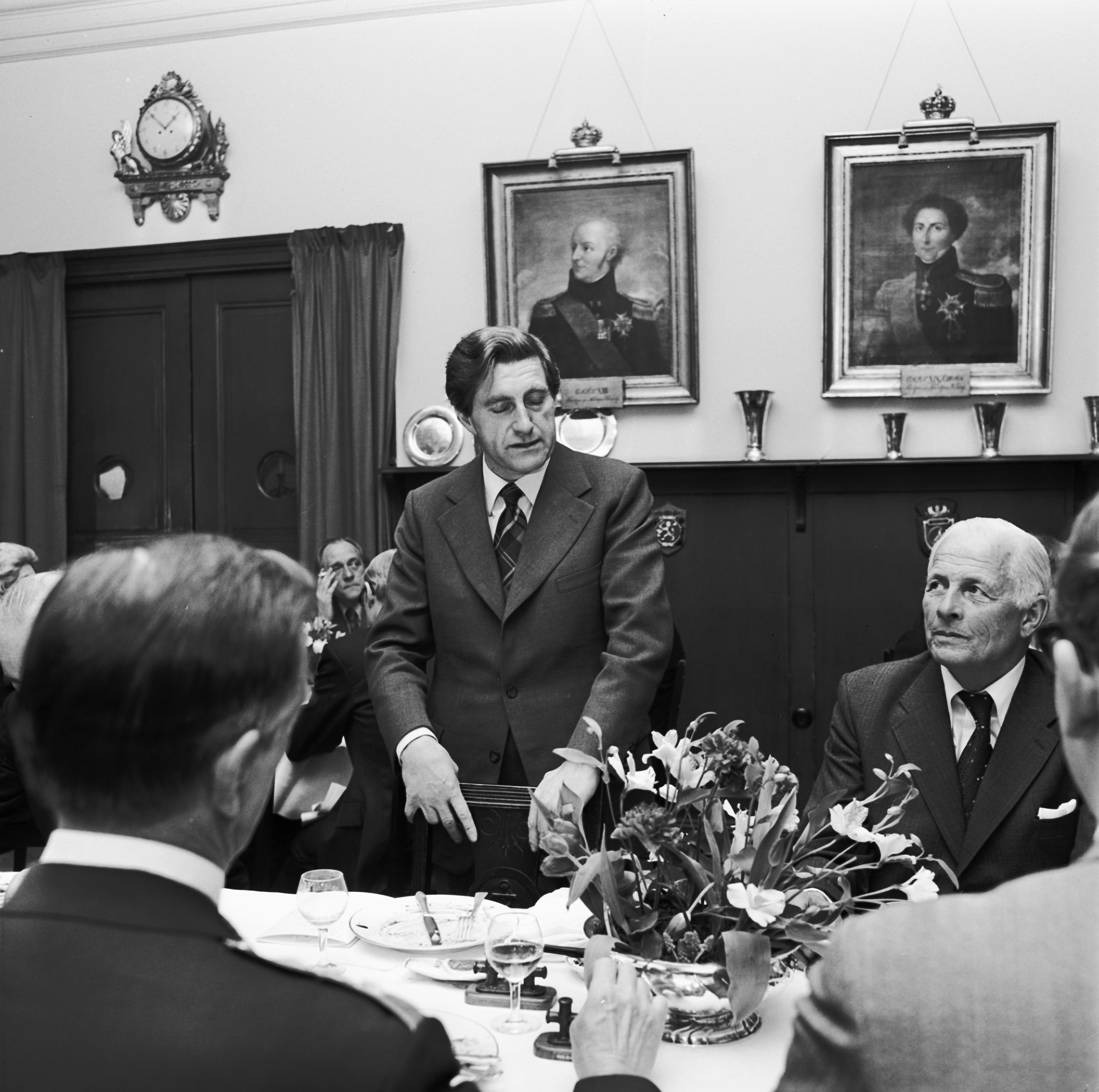
- Gustafsson in 1976

Minister for Housing
- In office 8 October 1982 – 4 October 1988
- Prime Minister: Olof Palme; Ingvar Carlsson
- Preceded by: Birgit Friggebo
- Succeeded by: Ulf Lönnqvist

Minister for Physical Planning and Local Government
- In office 1 January 1974 – 8 October 1976
- Preceded by: None
- Succeeded by: Johannes Antonsson

Minister for Civil Service Affairs
- In office 3 November 1973 – 31 December 1973
- Preceded by: Svante Lundkvist
- Succeeded by: None

Personal details
- Born: Hans Ingvar Gustafsson; 21 December 1923 Kvidinge, Sweden
- Died: 25 August 1998 (aged 74) Ronneby, Sweden
- Party: Social Democratic Party

Hans Ingvar Gustafsson (21 December 1923 – 25 August 1998) was a Swedish social democratic politician who held several government posts and was a member of the Swedish Parliament.

== Biography ==
Gustafsson was born on 21 December 1923. He was appointed minister for civil service in 1973, and then he served as minister for physical planning and local government for two years between 1974 and 1976. His last ministerial post was the minister of housing which he held from 1982 to 1988 in the second cabinet of Olof Palme and in the first cabinet of Ingvar Carlsson.

Gustafsson was also a member of the Social Democratic Party and served in the parliament for eighteen years in the period of 1976–1994 representing Blekinge County constituency. He died on 25 August 1998.
