= Minister for Civil Service Affairs =

Swedish cabinet position

Minister for Public Administration of Sweden
- Civilminister
- Lesser coat of arms of Sweden

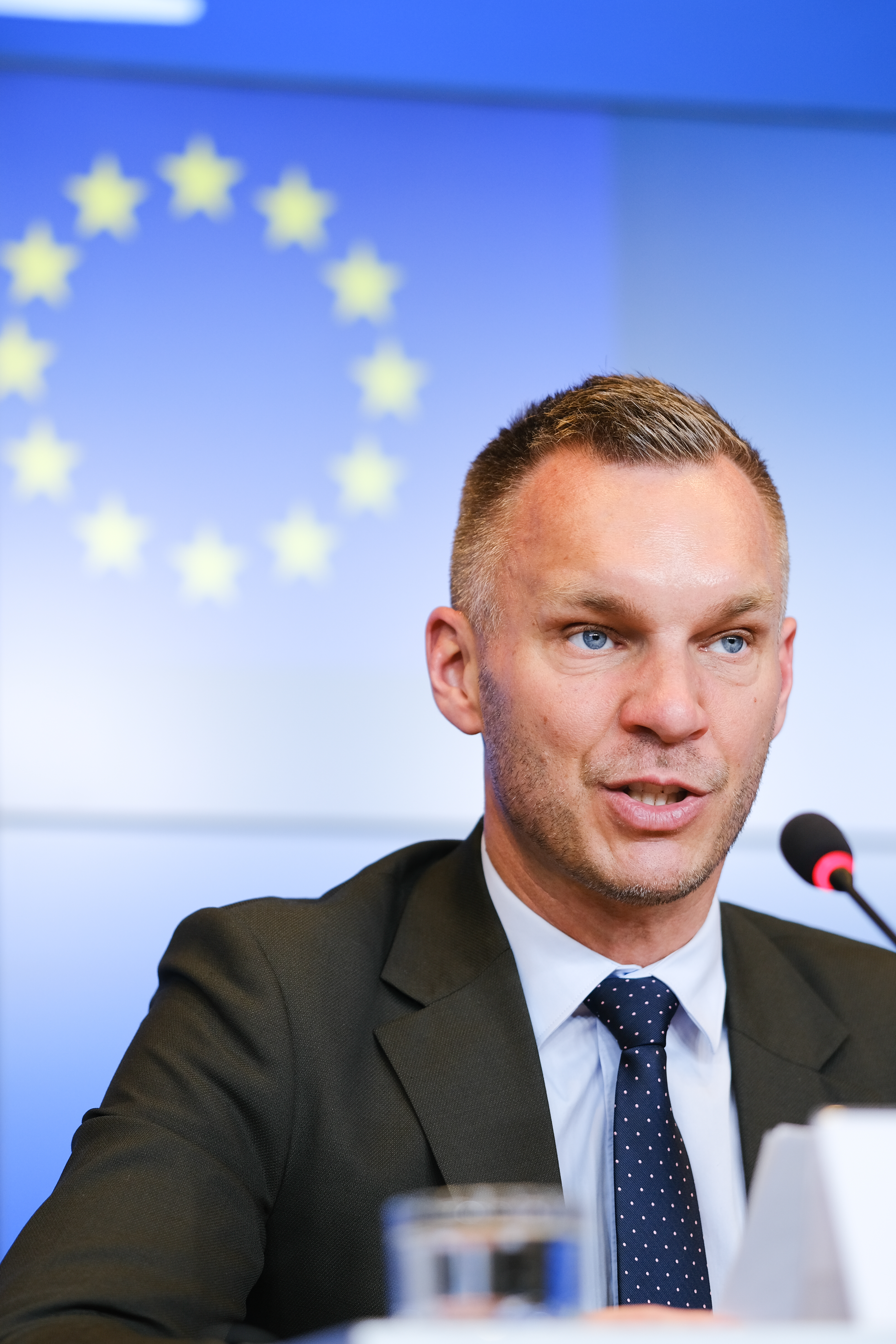
- Incumbent; Erik Slottner since 18 October 2022
- Ministry of Finance (formerly the Ministry for Civil Service Affairs)
- Appointer: The Prime Minister
- Term length: No fixed term Serves as long as the Prime Minister sees fit
- Formation: 1840
- First holder: Olof Fåhræus

The Minister for Civil Service Affairs (Swedish: Civilminister), since 2010 called Minister for Public Administration, is a member of the Government of Sweden. The minister for civil service affairs was the head of the Ministry for Civil Service Affairs from 1840 to 1996. It was reintroduced as a minister without portfolio post in 2010. Its tasks includes government procurement and an overall responsibility for municipalities and regions.

== History ==
The post was created when the Ministry for Civil Service Affairs was established in 1840. Through the Ministry for Civil Service Affairs, matters concerning the lantregeringen (county administrative boards) as well as rural municipalities, köping's and cities were prepared and presented. Other matters were communications (excluding road, ferry and bridge maintenance issues), in particular rail and postal services, telegraphs, telephones and other electrical installations, road, waterway and port facilities, medical and quarantine services, public health as well as civilian health care institutions, concerning the insurance and health insurance system as well as other social issues, concerning flammable oils and explosive goods and suchlike, concerning the borders of Sweden and the special status of the Laplanders, and finally in general all civil matters not assigned to another ministry. Among actual legal issues, the Ministry for Civil Service Affairs' handling included issues concerning the establishment, repeal, amendment or declaration of municipal statutes (except those relating to the church or education system) as well as legislative issues concerning insurance institutions and health insurance funds as well as compensation for occupational injuries. The cases were presented before the King by the minister for civil service affairs, who was a cabinet minister and had the title "Minister and Head of the Ministry for Civil Service Affairs", but in everyday speech was usually called the minister for civil service affairs. For the preparation and handling of cases, the minister had at his disposal an office, which in 1906 consisted of a director general for administrative affairs (expeditionschef), four directors (byråchef) (deputy directors, kansliråd), five administrative officers (kanslisekreterare), a senior registry clerk, an advisor assistant in the preparation of insurance matters and a number of extra ordinary officials.

In 1920, the Ministry for Civil Service Affairs was replaced by two ministries and hence the post of minister for civil service affairs disappeared. In 1950 the post was re-introduced when the ministry was re-established for the wage and pension system. In 1969, the ministry was completely emptied of its old contents and the minister and its ministry would instead be responsible for the county administrative boards, the municipalities and the national physical planning and then went by the name Ministry of Physical Planning and Local Government. In 1973, the post disappeared again when the ministry was renamed the Ministry of Local Government which then ceased on 31 December 1982. On 1 January 1983, the minister post was reintroduced once again as the Ministry for Civil Service Affairs came in its place as a pure ministry for issues concerning the public sector, for example for issues of working and employment conditions, co-determination and gender equality, Sweden's administrative division, rationalization and audit in central government, computer technology in public administration, statistics, public information, co-determination issues but also administrative matters concerning the Royal Court and Palace Administration (Slottsstaten). In June 1996, the Ministry for Civil Service Affairs was reorganized into the Ministry of the Interior and the post disappeared again.

In 2010, the post was reintroduced as the minister for public administration which is a minister without portfolio attached to the Ministry of Finance. Its tasks now includes government procurement and an overall responsibility for municipalities and regions.

== List of officeholders ==
Color key

Independent
Historical parties: Lantmanna Moderate National Party Liberals Liberals Liberals Liberals
Present parties: Social Democrats Moderate Centre Left Liberals Christian Democrats Green Sweden Democrats

Status

Denotes acting minister for civil service affairs

=== 1840–1920 ===
Portrait	Minister (Born-Died)	Term			Political Party	Coalition	Cabinet
Portrait	Minister (Born-Died)	Took office	Left office	Duration	Political Party	Coalition	Cabinet
Olof Fåhræus	Olof Fåhræus (1796–1884)	16 May 1840	23 September 1847	7 years, 130 days	Independent	–	Charles XIV John; Oscar I
Fredrik Fåhræus	Fredrik Fåhræus (1796–1865)	23 September 1847	16 December 1856	9 years, 84 days	Independent	–	Oscar I
Ludvig Almqvist	Ludvig Almqvist (1818–1884)	16 December 1856	2 November 1860	3 years, 322 days	Independent	–	Oscar I Charles XV
Gerhard Lagerstråle	Gerhard Lagerstråle (1814–1887)	2 November 1860	1 June 1868	7 years, 212 days	Independent	–	Charles XV
Axel Gustav Adlercreutz	Axel Gustav Adlercreutz (1821–1880)	4 June 1868	3 June 1870	1 year, 213 days	Independent	–	Charles XV
Axel Bergström	Axel Bergström (1823–1893)	3 June 1870	11 May 1875	4 years, 342 days	Independent	–	Oscar II
Carl Johan Thyselius	Carl Johan Thyselius (1811–1891)	11 May 1875	19 April 1880	4 years, 344 days	Independent	–	De Geer the Elder
Fredrik Hederstierna	Fredrik Hederstierna (1828–1900)	19 April 1880	5 October 1883	3 years, 169 days	Independent	–	Posse; Thyselius
Carl Johan Thyselius	Carl Johan Thyselius (1811–1891)	5 October 1883	30 November 1883	56 days	Independent	–	Thyselius
Edvard von Krusenstjerna	Edvard von Krusenstjerna (1841–1907)	30 November 1883	12 October 1889	5 years, 316 days	Independent	–	Thyselius; Themptander; Bildt
Lennart Groll	Lennart Groll (1845–1896)	12 October 1889	6 October 1896	6 years, 360 days	Independent	–	Boström I
Edvard von Krusenstjerna	Edvard von Krusenstjerna (1841–1907)	6 October 1896	5 July 1902	5 years, 272 days	Independent	–	Boström I von Otter
Hjalmar Westring	Hjalmar Westring (1857–1926)	5 July 1902	2 August 1905	3 years, 28 days	Independent	–	Boström II; Ramstedt
Johan Widén	Johan Widén (1856–1933)	2 August 1905	7 November 1905	97 days	Lantmanna	–	Lundeberg
Axel Schotte	Axel Schotte (1857–1922)	7 November 1905	29 May 1906	203 days	Liberals	–	Staaff I
Julius Juhlin	Julius Juhlin (1861–1934)	29 May 1906	4 December 1907	1 year, 189 days	Independent	–	Lindman I
Hugo E. G. Hamilton	Hugo E. G. Hamilton (1849–1928)	4 December 1907	7 October 1911	3 years, 307 days	Independent	–	Lindman I
Axel Schotte	Axel Schotte (1857–1922)	7 October 1911	17 February 1914	2 years, 133 days	Liberals	–	Staaff II
Oscar von Sydow	Oscar von Sydow (1873–1936)	16 February 1914	29 June 1917	3 years, 133 days	Independent	–	Hammarskjöld
Walter Murray	Walter Murray (1871–1957)	29 June 1917	19 October 1917	112 days	Independent	National Party–Electoral League	Swartz
Axel Schotte	Axel Schotte (1857–1922)	19 October 1917	28 November 1919	2 years, 40 days	Liberals	L–S	Edén
Fredrik Holmquist	Fredrik Holmquist (1857–1922)	28 November 1919	10 March 1920	103 days	Liberals	L–S	Edén
Carl Svensson	Carl Svensson (1879–1938)	10 March 1920	30 June 1920	112 days	Social Democrats	–	Branting I
=== 1950–1973 ===
Portrait	Minister (Born-Died)	Term			Political Party	Coalition	Cabinet
Portrait	Minister (Born-Died)	Took office	Left office	Duration	Political Party	Coalition	Cabinet
John Lingman	John Lingman (1901–1962)	1 July 1950	28 November 1954	4 years, 150 days	Social Democrats	–	Erlander I Erlander II
Gunnar Lange	Gunnar Lange (1909–1976)	29 November 1954	12 September 1955	287 days	Social Democrats	–	Erlander II
Sigurd Lindholm	Sigurd Lindholm (1904–1990)	12 September 1955	16 September 1965	10 years, 4 days	Social Democrats	–	Erlander II; Erlander III
Hans Gustafsson	Hans Gustafsson (1912–1981)	16 September 1965	1 July 1969	3 years, 288 days	Social Democrats	–	Erlander III
Svante Lundkvist	Svante Lundkvist (1919–1991)	1 July 1969	3 November 1973	4 years, 125 days	Social Democrats	–	Erlander III; Palme I
Hans Gustafsson	Hans Gustafsson (1923–1998)	3 November 1973	31 December 1973	58 days	Social Democrats	–	Palme I
=== 1983–1996 ===
Portrait	Minister (Born-Died)	Term			Political Party	Coalition	Cabinet
Portrait	Minister (Born-Died)	Took office	Left office	Duration	Political Party	Coalition	Cabinet
Bo Holmberg	Bo Holmberg (1942–2010)	1 January 1983	4 October 1988	5 years, 277 days	Social Democrats	–	Palme II; Carlsson I
Bengt K. Å. Johansson	Bengt K. Å. Johansson (1937–2021)	4 October 1988	4 October 1991	2 years, 351 days	Social Democrats	–	Carlsson I Carlsson II
Inger Davidson	Inger Davidson (born 1944)	21 October 1991	7 October 1994	2 years, 351 days	Christian Democrats	C–M–L–KD	Bildt
Marita Ulvskog	Marita Ulvskog (born 1951)	7 October 1994	22 March 1996	1 year, 167 days	Social Democrats	–	Carlsson III
Jörgen Andersson	Jörgen Andersson (born 1946)	22 March 1996	30 June 1996	100 days	Social Democrats	–	Persson
=== 2010–present ===
Portrait	Minister (Born-Died)	Term			Political Party	Coalition	Cabinet
Portrait	Minister (Born-Died)	Took office	Left office	Duration	Political Party	Coalition	Cabinet
Stefan Attefall	Stefan Attefall (born 1960)	5 October 2010	3 October 2014	3 years, 363 days	Christian Democrats	Alliance	Reinfeldt
Ardalan Shekarabi	Ardalan Shekarabi (born 1978)	3 October 2014	1 October 2019	4 years, 363 days	Social Democrats	S–MP	Löfven I Löfven II
Lena Micko	Lena Micko (born 1955)	1 October 2019	30 November 2021	2 years, 60 days	Social Democrats	S–MP	Löfven II; Löfven III
Ida Karkiainen	Ida Karkiainen (born 1988)	30 November 2021	18 October 2022	322 days	Social Democrats	–	Andersson
Erik Slottner	Erik Slottner (born 1980)	18 October 2022	Incumbent	3 years, 324 days	Christian Democrats	M–KD–L	Kristersson
