= Karl Boo =

Swedish politician (1918–1996)

Member of the Parliament of Sweden
- In office 1961–1988

Minister for Physical Planning and Local Government
- In office 1979–1982

President of the Swedish Association of Local Authorities
- In office 1977–1980

Karl Boo (9 September 1918 – 22 February 1996) was a Swedish politician. He was a member of the Centre Party. He was a member of the Parliament of Sweden (lower chamber) 1961–1970, and of the unicameral parliament 1970–1988. From 1979 to 1982 he was minister for physical planning and local government in the Government of Sweden.

From 1977 to 1980, Boo was the president of the Swedish Association of Local Authorities (Svenska Kommunförbundet), an association that existed from 1969 to 2007 (now part of the Swedish Association of Regions) to interact with the Riksdag of Sweden.

Preceded by Inge Hörlén	President of the Swedish Association of Local Authorities; 1977–1980	Succeeded by Inge Hörlén
