= Carl Johan Thyselius =

His Excellency Carl Johan Thyselius
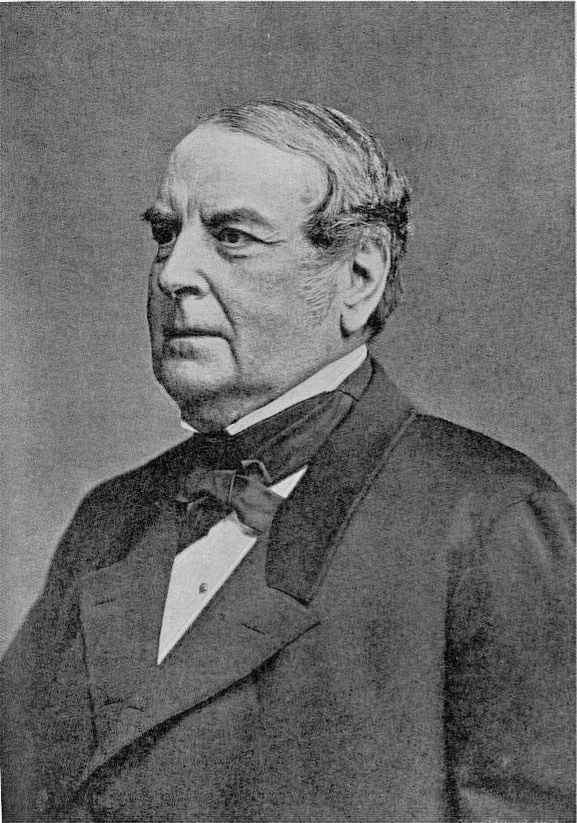

Prime Minister of Sweden
- In office 13 June 1883 – 16 May 1884
- Monarch: Oscar II
- Preceded by: Arvid Posse
- Succeeded by: Robert Themptander

Personal details
- Born: 8 June 1811 Österhaninge, Sweden
- Died: 11 January 1891 (aged 79) Stockholm, Sweden
- Party: Independent conservative
- Spouse: Charlotta Melart
- Education: Uppsala University

Carl Johan Thyselius (8 June 1811 – 11 January 1891) was a politician, state official, Justice of the Supreme Court of Sweden 1856–1860, minister of education and ecclesiastical affairs 1860–1863, Minister for Civil Service Affairs (responsible for trade, industry and ship transport) 1875–1880, and served as Prime Minister from 1883 to 1884.

== Biography ==
Carl Johan Thyselius was born in Österhaninge, Södermanland County, as the son of the vicar and future bishop Pehr Thyselius and Christina Margareta Bergsten.

Typical for his time, after an education in administration at Uppsala University, he combined a successful career in high-level official positions with major political assignments. He was, among other things, Justice of the Supreme Court of Sweden 1856–1860, minister of education and ecclesiastical affairs 1860–1863, president of the Kammarkollegiet 1864–1875 and minister for civil service affairs 1875–1880. After Arvid Posse's resignation in 1883, Thyselius reluctantly became Prime Minister at the request of Oscar II for one year.

He died on 11 January 1891 in Stockholm.

== Personal life ==
In 1848, Thyselius married Charlotta Melart, with whom he had a daughter.

Thyselius was Sweden's first prime minister not descended from the nobility. He was furthermore 72 years and 5 days old upon accession, making him the oldest person to become Prime Minister in Swedish history to this day.

== See also ==
- Prime Minister of Sweden
- List of Swedish politicians

Political offices
Preceded by Arvid Posse	Prime Minister of Sweden; 13 June 1883–16 May 1884	Succeeded by Robert Themptander
