= Ministry of the Budget =

Swedish government department (1976–1982)

Ministry of Commerce and Industry
- Handelsdepartementet

Budget ministry overview
- Formed: 25 November 1976
- Preceding Budget ministry: Ministry of Finance
- Dissolved: 31 December 1982
- Superseding Budget ministry: Ministry of Finance
- Headquarters: Stockholm
- Minister responsible: Minister for the Budget
- Parent agency: Government Offices

The Ministry of the Budget (Swedish: Budgetdepartementet, B) was a ministry in Sweden established in 1976. The ministry was primarily responsible for budget regulation as well as the general administration and accounting of state funds, the state and municipal tax system. The ministry was headed by the minister for the budget. The ministry ceased to exist in 1982.

== History ==
The ministry was established after the 1976 Swedish general election when the Ministry of Finance was divided into the Ministry of the Budget and the Ministry of Economics. The division officially took place on 25 November 1976 following a government decision on 11 November. Most of the old Ministry of Finance's approximately 9,000 cases a year were taken care of by the Ministry of the Budget, e.g. the taxes, the budget and salary issues. The Ministry of Economics would primarily work with general guidelines for economic policy and the principled direction of fiscal and credit policy measures.

The ministry was primarily responsible for budget regulation as well as the general administration and accounting of state funds, the state and municipal tax system. State land and buildings, alcoholic beverages, resident registration, press support and information, personnel administrative planning, personnel health care, etc. within the state's area of responsibility, administrative democracy, etc. and training of government employees. The ministry's internal organization initially consisted of a Budget Department (BA) which would be responsible for the state budget and related issues. Furthermore, there were a number of so-called sakområden ("subject areas") for various issues and a secretariat for statistical data. In 1978, a secretariat for personnel policy matters (PP) was added to the Government Offices (Regeringskansliet). A part of this secretariat that dealt with negotiation issues regarding the personnel in the Government Offices was transferred in 1979 to the newly established body Government Office's Negotiation Delegation (Regeringskansliets förhandlingsdelegation), from 1982 the Government Office's Personnel Policy Delegation (Regeringskansliets personalpolitiska delegation, RPD). The PP Secretariat was merged in 1983 with the ministry's Organization Department where the RPD was also brought and then formed the independent Administrative Office of the Government Offices (Regeringskansliets förvaltningskontor). In 1978–79, certain internal reorganizations were made and from 1980 the ministry had the organization that would exist as long as the Ministry of the Budget remained.

The ministry was headed by the minister for the budget. In addition, there was two state secretaries, two directors general for administrative affairs (expeditionschef), two directors general for legal affairs (rättchef), a head of budget and other officials in different fields.

The ministry was abolished after the 1982 Swedish general election and the Ministry of Finance was re-established by Palme's Second Cabinet on 1 January 1983.

== Central boards and agencies ==
In 1976, the following central administrative boards and agencies belonged to the Ministry of the Budget: the Legal, Financial and Administrative Services Agency, the Swedish Agency for Administrative Development (Statskontoret), the Swedish Board of Customs (Generaltullstyrelsen), the National [Swedish] Board of Public Building (Byggnadsstyrelsen), the National [Swedish] Computing Centre for Administrative Data Processing (Datamaskincentralen för administrativ databehandling), the Auditor General of the National [Swedish] Accounting and Audit Bureau (Riksrevisionsverket), the National Swedish Tax Board, Nämnden för rättsärenden, the Seamen's Tax Committee (Sjömansskattenämnden), the Board of General Tax (Duty) on the Consumption of Electric Energy and Fuels (Energiskattenämnden), Reklamskattenämnden, the Inter-Municipal Fiscal Court of Appeal (Mellankommunala skatterätten), the Board of Taxation Equalization (Skatteutjämningsnämnden), Kilometerskattenämnden, the National [Swedish] Board for Municipal Negotiations (Statens förhandlingsnämnd), the Joint Government-Municipal Land Utilization Board (Stats-kommunala marknämnden), the National [Swedish] Board for Civic Information (Nämnden för samhällsinformation), the National Swedish Collective Bargaining Office, SAV's Pay Delegation (SAV:s lönedelegation), the National [Swedish] Civil Service Pensions Board (Statens tjänstepensionsnämnd), the National [Swedish] Employment Security Board (Trygghetsnämnden), Skiljenämnden i vissa trygghetsfrågor, Statsverkens arbetsstudieråd, Statsverkens yrkesråd, the National [Swedish] Government Employee Pensions Board (Statens personalpensionsverk), the National [Swedish] Government Employee Administration Board (Statens personalnämnd), Statens regionala hälsoråd, the National [Swedish] Official Quarters Committee (Statens tjänstebostadsnämnd), the National [Swedish] Government Employee Housing Delegation (Statens personalbostadsdelegation), Statens grupplivnämnd, the National [Swedish] Government Employee Training Board (Statens personalutbildningsnämnd), the Board for Certain Staff Relocation Issues (Nämnden för vissa omplaceringsfrågor), Statens maskinpersonalnämnd, Statstjänstenämnden, Statsförvaltningens centrala förslagsnämnd, Statens och kommunernas samarbetsnämnd i lönefrågor, National [Swedish] Working Environment Board (Statens arbetsmiljönämnd), Skiljenämnden för arbetarskyddsfrågor, Statens ansvarsnämnd, Statens förhandlingsråd, the National [Swedish] Land Utilization Delegation (Statens markdelegation), and the Den nämnd som avses i särskilt huvudavtal för den offentliga sektorn.

== See also ==
- Minister for the Budget
