= Ministry of the Interior (Sweden) =

- Inrikesdepartementet

Interior ministry overview
- Formed: 1 July 1947 (1st time); 1 July 1996 (2nd time)
- Dissolved: 31 December 1973 (1st time); 31 December 1998 (2nd time)
- Superseding Interior ministry: Ministries of Employment and Housing (1st time)
- Headquarters: Mynttorget 2, Stockholm, Sweden
- Minister responsible: Minister of the Interior
- Parent agency: Government Offices (Note: Before 1 January 1975, the Government Offices was called the Royal Chancery.)

The Ministry of the Interior (Note: Ministry of the Interior; (British equivalent roughly) the Home Office; (Scotland) the Scottish Home Department; (American equivalent roughly) the Department of the Interior; (also) the Ministry for Home Affairs or the Ministry of Labour and Housing.) (Swedish: Inrikesdepartementet, In) was a ministry in Sweden established in 1947. The department dealt with matters concerning general health and medical care, the police service, the fire service, and the local government. The ministry was headed by the minister of the interior. At the end of 1973, the Ministry of the Interior ceased to exist and the activities were taken over by other ministries, such as the Ministry of Employment and the Ministry of Housing. In 1996, the former Ministry for Civil Service Affairs changed its name to the Ministry of the Interior and was called that until 1998, when the ministry ceased.

== History ==
The Ministry of the Interior was established on 1 July 1947 (King in Council's charter 1947:319 regarding the state ministries). From the Ministry for Social Affairs to the new ministry, matters relating to general health and medical care were transferred, which also included child disability care, pharmacies, midwifery, public dentistry as well as forensic examinations, sobriety activities and treatment for alcoholics and the treatment of loiters, etc., the lantregeringen (county administrative boards), the administrative divisions of Sweden, rural municipalities, cities etc. From the Ministry of Justice, matters relating to the use of the Aliens Act, the police service and the majority of matters relating to public order and security, as well as civil defence and matters relating to elections, were transferred. From the Ministry of Communications (Transport) matters concerning the fire service were transferred. The Ministry of the Interior also dealt with legislative matters in matters belonging to its administrative area, primarily municipal, police, food, hospital and health care legislation as well as the public order and health care statute regulations.

The ministry's tasks were largely unchanged until the 1960s, when several large redistributions of matters between different ministries gave the Ministry of the Interior a different work area than it originally had. From the Ministry of the Interior, on 1 July 1963, matters relating to public health and medical care were transferred back to the Ministry for Social Affairs. At the same time, matters concerning housing and labor market issues were transferred from the Ministry for Social Affairs to the Ministry of the Interior (SFS 1963:214). On 1 July 1966, the Ministry of the Interior handed over matters concerning the police service and public order and security to the Ministry of Justice. At the same time, the Ministry of the Interior took care of matters concerning the localization of businesses (SFS 1966:256). On 1 March 1967, matters concerning the Office of the Governor of Stockholm, county administrative boards, municipalities, cities, etc. were transferred from the Ministry of the Interior to the Ministry of Communications (Transport) and matters relating to civil defence and psychological defence to the Ministry of Defence (SFS 1967:47). On 1 July 1967 matters relating to elections to the Riksdag were transferred to the Ministry of Communications (Transport) (SFS 1967:355). At the end of 1973, the Ministry of the Interior ceased to exist and the activities were taken over by other ministries, such as the Ministry of Employment and the Ministry of Housing. Like other ministries, the Ministry of the Interior was initially divided into departments and agencies. With the ministry reform of 1965 (SFS 1965:386), this structure ceased and the ministry was divided into a number of so-called units and secretariats.

Among other things, the following central boards and agencies (centrala ämbetsverk) belonged to the Ministry of the Interior: the National Swedish Board of Health, Näringsrådet, the National Swedish Bacteriological Laboratory (statens bakteriologiska laboratorium), the National Swedish Laboratory for Forensic Chemistry (statens rättskemiska laboratorium), the National Swedish Pharmaceutical Laboratory (statens farmaceutiska laboratorium), Mental Illness Board (sinnessjuknämnden), the Central Board of Hospital Planning (centrala sjukvårdsberedningen), the National Swedish Institute of Public Health (statens institut för folkhälsan), National Swedish Laboratory of Forensic Science, the National Swedish Police College (statens polisskola), the State Police (statspolisen), the National Swedish Office for Aliens (statens utlänningskommission), the Swedish Civil Defence Board, the National Swedish Fire Service Inspectorate (statens brandinspektion) and the National Swedish Fire Service College (statens brandskola).

In 1974, the Ministry of the Interior was renamed the Ministry of Employment. In 1996, the former Ministry for Civil Service Affairs changed its name to the Ministry of the Interior and was called that until 1998, when the ministry ceased.

== Structure ==
The Ministry of the Interior, whose head was colloquially known as the minister of the interior, was divided into two main departments, the State Secretary Department and the Director General for Administrative Affairs' Department. Under the former was the Law Office (Lagbyrån), under the latter the Landsstaten Department (Landsstatsavdelningen) and the Medical Office (Medicinalbyrån). The State Secretary Department was active at the Ministry of the Interior between 1 July 1947 and 30 June 1965. Then the Planning and Budget Secretariat (Planerings- och budgetsekretariatet, PB) took over from 1 July 1965. The State Department was active within the Ministry of the Interior between 1 July 1947 and 28 February 1967. Matters relating to health care were prepared by the Ministry of the Interior between 1947 and 30 June 1963, then by the Ministry for Social Affairs. The Second Office/Police Office/Police Unit (Andra byrån/Polisbyrån/Polisenheten) operated between 1 January 1956 and 28 February 1967. On 1 July 1966, police affairs were taken over by the Ministry of Justice. The Localization Unit (Lokaliseringsenheten) was active at the Ministry of the Interior from 1 July 1965. On 1 July 1963, labor market matters were transferred from the Ministry for Social Affairs to the Ministry of the Interior. The Housing Agency/Housing Unit (Bostadsbyrån/Bostadsenheten) operated at the Ministry of the Interior from 1 July 1963, when matters relating to housing were transferred from the Ministry for Social Affairs to the Ministry of the Interior.

=== 1947-07-01 – 1955-12-30 ===
- Departments and offices: State Secretary Department (Statssekreteraravdelningen, Sa), Landsstaten Department (Landsstatsavdelningen, L), Medical Office (Medicinalbyrån, M), Supreme Administrative Court Office (Regeringsrättsbyrån, R), Law Office (Lagbyrån, SaL)
- Remark: Alien cases, police cases, fire service, civil defence and some other cases of smaller scope were handled during the period by L.

=== 1956-01-01 – 1956-10-30 ===
- Departments and offices: State Secretary Department (Statssekreteraravdelningen, Sa), Landsstaten Department (Landsstatsavdelningen, L), 1st Office (1:a byrån, 1B), 2nd Office (2:a byrån, 2B), Supreme Administrative Court Office (Regeringsrättsbyrån, R), Law Office (Lagbyrån, SaL)
- Remark: The 1st Office dealt with medicinal matters. The 2nd Office dealt with various matters, including pharmacy cases, sales activities, aliens and civil defence cases.

=== 1956-11-01 – 1963-06-30 ===
- Departments and offices: State Secretary Department (Statssekreteraravdelningen, S), Landsstaten Department (Landsstatsavdelningen, L), Medical Office (Medicinalbyrån, M, former 1B), Second Office (Andra byrån, A, former 2B), Supreme Administrative Court Office (Regeringsrättsbyrån, R), Law Office (Lagbyrån, SaL, until 30 December 1958), Legal Department (Rättsavdelningen, Ra, from 1 January 1959), AL Office (AL-byrån) (1 July 1960 – 30 December 1960)
- Remark: The AL Office handled police cases that had previously been handled at L. After 1 January 1961, such cases were handled by A.

=== 1963-07-01 – 1965-06-30 ===
- Departments and offices: State Secretary Department (Statssekreteraravdelningen, Sa), Landsstaten Department (Landsstatsavdelningen, L), Legal Department (Rättsavdelningen, Ra), Labor Market Office (Arbetsmarknadsbyrån, A), Housing Office (Bostadsbyrån, B), Police Office (Polisbyrån, P, former A), Supreme Administrative Court Office (Regeringsrättsbyrån, IR), Civil Defence Office (Civilförsvarsbyrån, C, 1 July 1964 – 30 June 1965)
- Remark: The Medical Office was transferred to the Ministry for Social Affairs. The Labor Market and Housing Office came from the Ministry for Social Affairs. The C Office was added out of the P Office. After 1 July 1965, it merged again with the P Office.

=== 1965-07-01 – 1967-02-28 ===
- Departments and offices: Planning and Budget Secretariat (Planerings- och budgetsekretariatet, PB), Landsstaten Department (Landsstatsavdelningen, La), Legal Secretariat (Rättssekretariatet, R), Labor Market Unit (Arbetsmarknadsenheten, A), Housing Unit (Bostadsenheten, B), Police Unit (Polisenheten, P), Localization Unit (Lokaliseringsenheten, Lok), Supreme Administrative Court Office (Regeringsrättsbyrån, IR), International Secretariat (Internationella sekretariatet, I, from 1 January 1967)
- Remark: On 1 July 1966, police affairs were taken over by the Ministry of Justice (The P unit remained).

=== 1967-03-01 – ===
- Departments and offices: Planning and Budget Secretariat (Planerings- och budgetsekretariatet, PB, 31 March 1967 – 1 August 1969 the Budget Secretariat (Budgetsekretariatet, Bs), Legal Secretariat (Rättssekretariatet, R), International Secretariat (Internationella sekretariatet, IS), Labor Market Unit (Arbetsmarknadsenheten, A), Housing Unit (Bostadsenheten, B), Localization Unit (Lokaliseringsenheten, L), Immigrant Unit (Invandrarenheten, IM, from 1 July 1971)
- Remark: The A unit dealt with alien cases until 30 June 1971, after which the handling of such cases was taken over by IM. The IM unit also dealt with matters concerning refugees, adaptation measures for immigrants, acquisition and loss of Swedish citizenship, as well as consular matters concerning the department's personnel. Matters concerning unarmed service were dealt with by the A unit. Construction industry issues, etc. was handled by the B unit.

== Location ==
Until 1973, the ministry was located in Kanslihuset at Mynttorget 2 in Stockholm.

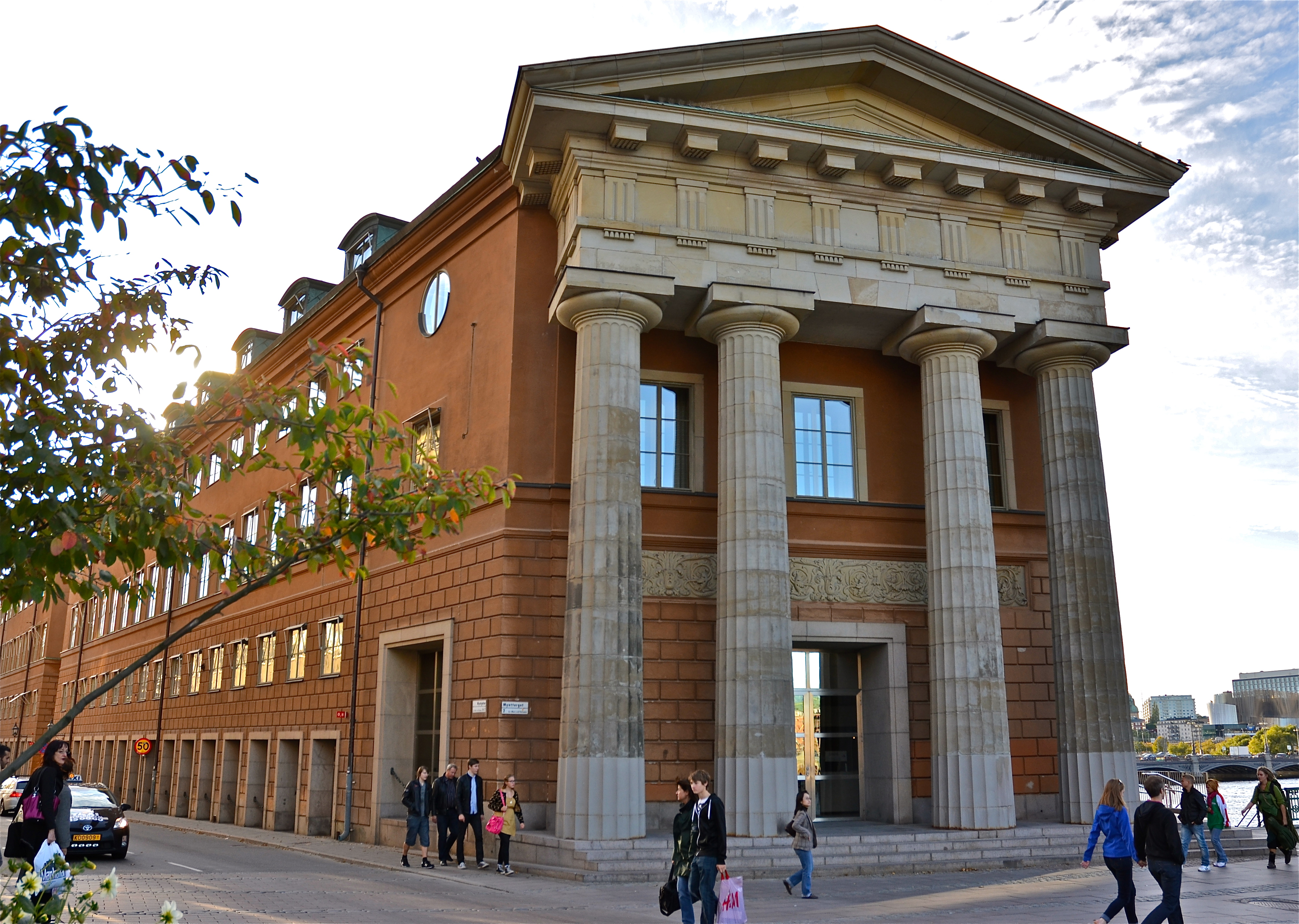
Mynttorget 2

== See also ==
- Minister of the Interior
