= Bo Holmberg =

Swedish politician (1942–2010)

Governor of Södermanland
- In office 1996–2005

Member of the Swedish Parliament for Västernorrland
- In office 1985–1996

Personal details
- Born: 17 November 1942 Härnösand, Sweden
- Died: 11 February 2010 (aged 67)
- Spouse: Anna Lindh (m. 1991; died 2003)
- Children: 2

Bo Lindor Holmberg (17 November 1942 – 11 February 2010) was a Swedish politician, Governor of Södermanland, and husband of former Minister for Foreign Affairs Anna Lindh.

== Biography ==
Holmberg's first major political assignment was as a Commissioner of the Västernorrland County Council from 1976 to 1982. In 1982, he was made minister for physical planning and local government in the newly elected Social Democrat Government, and in the following year minister for civil service affairs, on which post he remained until 1988. He then served as a Member of the Parliament for his home constituency of Västernorrland until being appointed Governor of Södermanland on 1 July 1996. His term ended in 2005.

Holmberg was married to Lindh from 1991 until she was assassinated in 2003. They had two sons, David and Filip.

Holmberg was found dead in his apartment on Södermalm in Stockholm on 11 February 2010 at age 67. He is buried at Gudmundrå Cemetery in Kramfors.

== See also ==
- List of Södermanland Governors, Government of Sweden
