= Ministry of Rural Affairs and Infrastructure (Sweden) =

Government ministry of Sweden

- Landsbygds- och infrastrukturdepartementet
- Lesser Coat of Arms

Agency overview
- Formed: 1 January 2023
- Preceding agencies: Ministry of Infrastructure (2022); Ministry of Rural Affairs (2014)
- Jurisdiction: SFS 2022:1873
- Headquarters: Herkulesgatan 17, Stockholm
- Employees: 299 (2024)
- Annual budget: SEK 383 million (2025)
- Ministers responsible: Peter Kullgren, Head of the Ministry Minister for Rural Affairs; Andreas Carlson, Minister for Infrastructure and Housing
- Parent agency: Government Offices (Note: Before 1 January 1975, the Government Offices was called the Royal Chancery.)
- Website: www.government.se/government-of-sweden/ministry-of-rural-affairs-and-infrastructure/

The Ministry of Rural Affairs and Infrastructure (Swedish: Landsbygds- och infrastrukturdepartementet) is a ministry in the Government of Sweden responsible for policies related to rural areas, food and land- and water-based industries, regional development, transport and infrastructure, housing, and community planning.

The ministry is currently headed by the Minister for Rural Affairs, Peter Kullgren of the Christian Democrats.

== History ==
The ministry was established on 1 January 2023 when the responsibilities of the Ministry of Infrastructure was merged with the responsibilities carried out by the Minister for Rural Affairs, then sorted under the Ministry of Enterprise, forming the Ministry for Rural Affairs and Infrastructure.

It's located on Herkulesgatan 17 in Stockholm.

== Government agencies and other bodies ==
The Ministry of Rural Affairs and Infrastructure is principal for 15 government agencies and one state-owned company.

=== Agencies ===
- National Board of Housing, Building and Planning
- Maritime Administration
- National Road and Transport Research Institute
- Transport Administration
- Transport Agency
- Transport Analysis
- Civil Aviation Administration
- University of Agricultural Sciences
- National Veterinary Institute
- Forest Agency
- National Food Agency
- Mapping, Cadastral and Land Registration Authority
- Board of Agriculture
- Central Ethical Committee on Animal Experiments
- Veterinary Disciplinary Board

=== State-owned companies ===
- Statens Bostadsomvandling AB (Sbo)

== Policy areas ==
- Housing and community planning
- Regional development
- Rural affairs
- Transport and infrastructure

== See also ==
- Agriculture in Sweden
- Telecommunications in Sweden
- Ministry of Agriculture/for Rural Affairs (1900–2014)
