= Johannes Antonsson =

Swedish politician (1921–1995)

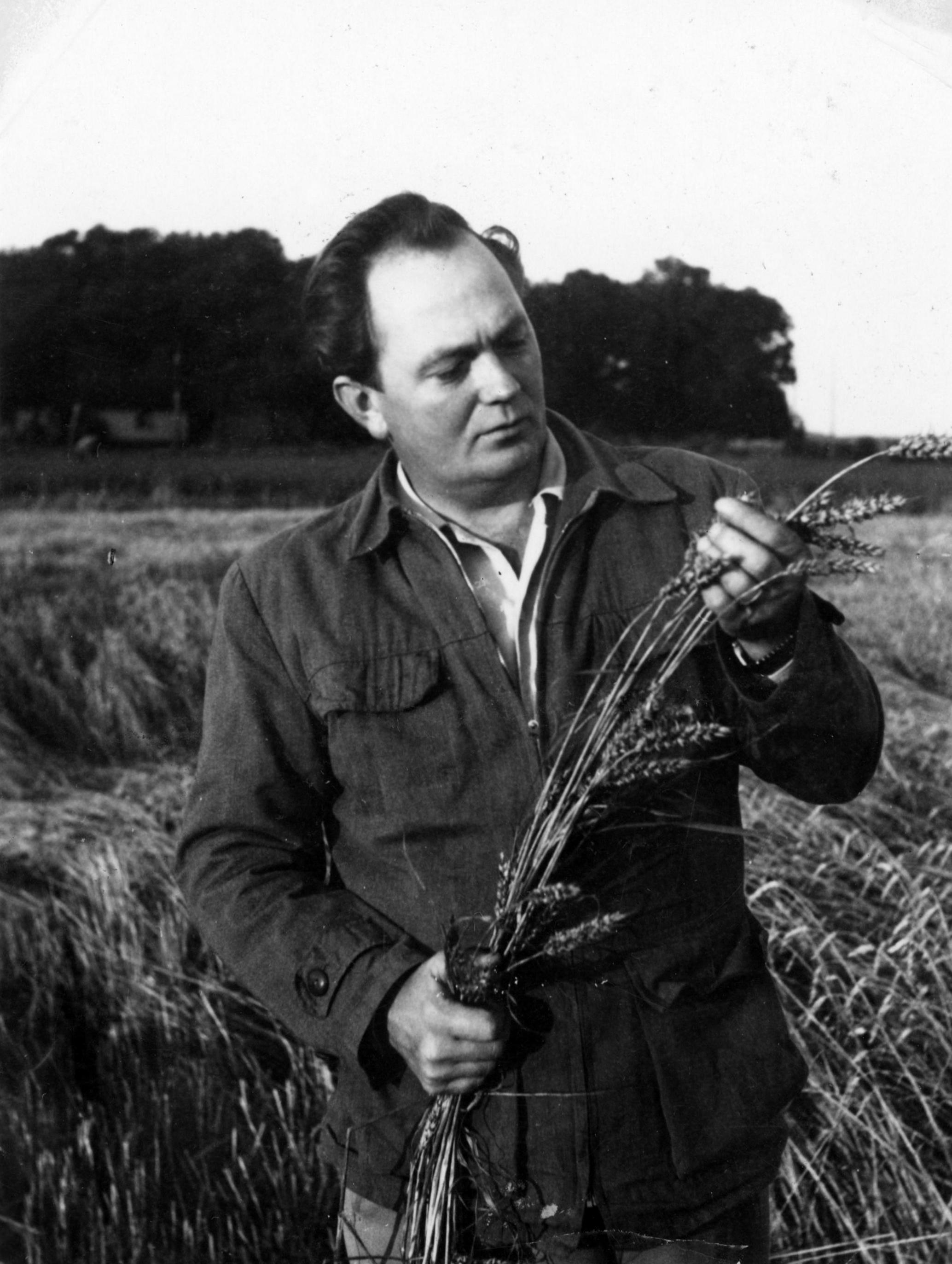

member of the Riksdag
- In office 1958–1979

Minister for Physical Planning and Local Government
- In office 1976–1978

Governor of the province of Halland
- In office 1979–1986

Personal details
- Born: 20 November 1921
- Died: 25 August 1995
- Political party: Centre Party

Johannes Antonsson (20 November 1921 – 25 August 1995) was a Swedish politician for the Centre Party. A member of the Riksdag from 1958 to 1979, he was minister for physical planning and local government from 1976 to 1978, and Governor of the province of Halland from 1979 to 1986. He also served as vice-chairman of the Centre Party from 1969 to 1979.
