= Vasagatan, Stockholm =

Street in Stockholm, Sweden

Coordinates: 59°19′55″N 18°03′28″E

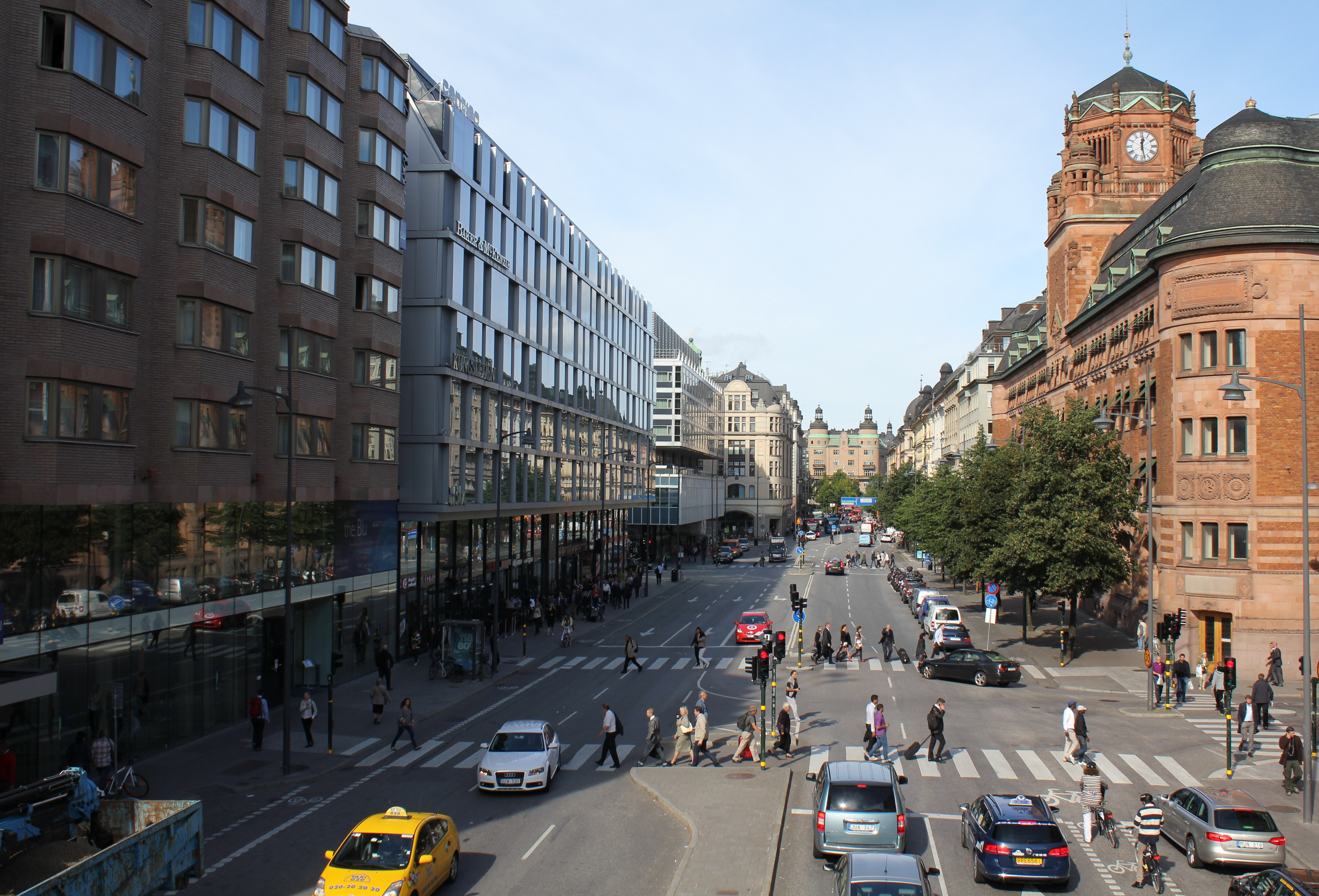
Vasagatan in 2012

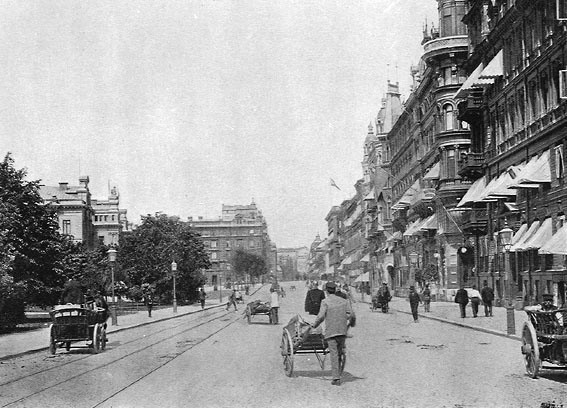
Vasagatan sometime around 1900.

Vasagatan is a major street in central Stockholm named after King Gustav Vasa.

In its southern end it is connected to the old town Gamla Stan by the bridge Vasabron, from where it stretches north to the public square Norra Bantorget. It passes in front of the Stockholm Central Station and is intercepted by Kungsgatan.

== Buildings ==
- Central Post Office Building
- Stockholm Central Station

== See also ==
- Geography of Stockholm
