= Svante Lundkvist =

Swedish politician (1919–1991)

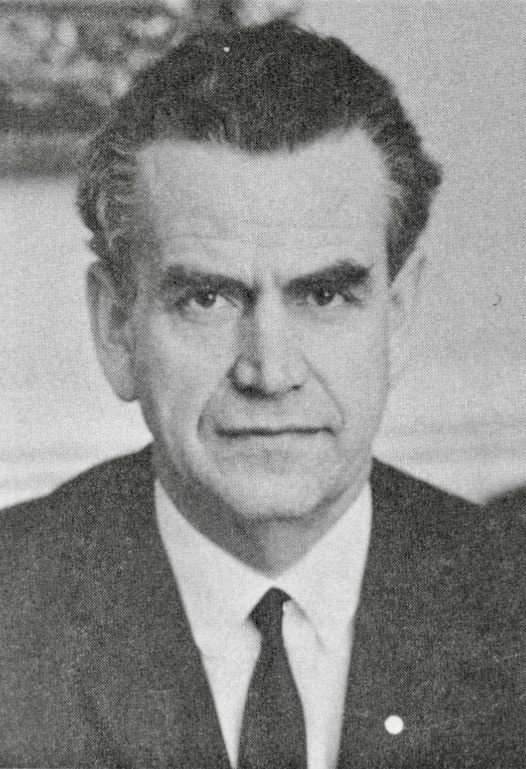

Personal details
- Born: Karl Svante Lundkvist; 20 July 1919 Eskilstuna, Sweden
- Died: 9 July 1991 (aged 71) Eskilstuna, Sweden
- Party: Social Democratic Party

Svante Lundkvist (20 July 1919 – 9 July 1991) was a Swedish trade unionist and social democratic politician. He held various cabinet posts, including minister of communication, minister of civil service affairs and minister of agriculture. He was a long-term member of the Parliament serving between 1959 and 1986.

== Early life and education ==
Lundkvist was born in Eskilstuna on 20 July 1919. He received a university degree in 1935 and started his career at the post office. His political career also began during this period. He was a member of the Social Democratic Youth Union and involved in trade union activities in the local branch of the Swedish Postmen's Union.

== Career and activities ==
At age 24 he became the president of the Postmen's Union's youth branch. Later he was elected to the council of the Postmen's Union and was appointed head of the Södermanland district of the Social Democratic Party. He became a city councillor in Eskilstuna of which he was elected as chairman in 1957.

Lundkvist was elected to the Parliament in 1959 for the Social Democratic Party and served there until 1986. He was appointed minister of state in 1965. In this capacity, he was responsible for civil defense and municipality and county councils, and his term ended in 1967. He was the minister of communication between 1967 and 1969. Next he served as the minister of civil service affairs from 1969 to 1973. He was appointed minister of agriculture in 1973 and remained in office until 1976. During his term as agriculture minister Lundkvist signed the Nordic Environmental Protection Convention on behalf of Sweden on 19 February 1974.

Lundkvist was again named as the minister of agriculture in 1982, and his term ended in 1986. His state secretary was Ulf Lönnqvist. Lundkvist was replaced by Mats Hellström as agriculture minister.

In August 1984 Agriculture Minister Lundkvist initiated meetings with other Scandinavian countries, Austria, Canada, France, the Netherlands, Switzerland, and West Germany to discuss the limits of vehicle emissions as a response to the European Economic Community's decision on the topic dated May 1984. Although France left the group after the first meeting, Lichtenstein joined it which has been called the Stockholm Group. However, Lundkvist's second term as agriculture minister witnessed some conflicts due to the high prices of agricultural products and delayed agricultural reforms. In May 1985 one of the largest demonstrations in the history of Sweden took place in Stockholm with the participation of nearly 25,000 farmers who marched to the headquarters of the Social Democratic Party. One of their slogans directed Lundkvist asking his resignation. Because he supported a state-controlled agricultural policy in which investments would be limited. His proposal was just the opposite of the Finance Minister Kjell-Olof Feldt's view who proposed a deregulation of agricultural policy to make agricultural markets efficient.

Lundkvist also served as the chairman of the Swedish film review board.

== Death ==
Lundkvist died in his hometown on 9 July 1991.
