= Borders of Sweden =

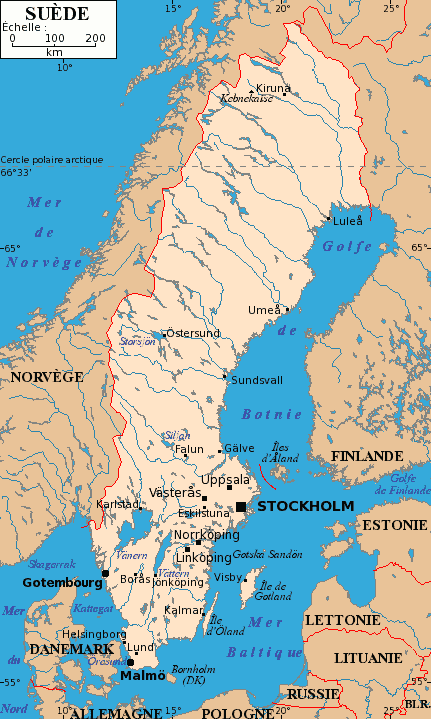

The borders of Sweden are as follows:

- The Sweden–Denmark border
- The Sweden–Finland border
- The Sweden–Norway border
