= Government Offices of Sweden =

Government Offices
- Regeringskansliet

Agency overview
- Formed: 1 January 1975
- Preceding agency: Royal Chancery
- Headquarters: Stockholm, Sweden
- Employees: 5,100
- Annual budget: SEK 9.512 billion (2024)
- Agency executive: Ulf Kristersson, Prime Minister of Sweden
- Key document: SFS 1996:1515
- Website: www.regeringen.se/regeringskansliet/

The Government Offices (Swedish: Regeringskansliet, RK), formerly known as the Royal Chancery (Swedish: Kunglig Majestäts kansli) before 1975, is a government agency in Sweden responsible for supporting the government in governing the country and implementing its policies. The Government Offices comprise the Prime Minister's Office, ten ministries, and the Government Offices' Office for Administrative Affairs (Regeringskansliets förvaltningsavdelning). The ministries handle their respective policy areas, while the Government Offices Office for Administrative Affairs provides overarching support, services, and development. The Prime Minister's Office leads and coordinates the work of the Government Offices, with the Prime Minister serving as its head.

== History ==
In 1974, the Swedish constitution was amended to redefine the organization of the state. The King transferred all power to the parliament and the government. At the same time, the Royal Chancery was renamed from the Kunglig Majestäts kansli to Regeringskansliet (Government Offices). This change in terminology reflected a significant shift in Sweden's system of government, marking the full establishment of parliamentary rule.

Since 1997, the Government Offices have been organized as a single agency, comprising the Prime Minister's Office, all ministries, and the Government Offices Office for Administrative Affairs, which functions as a shared administrative body for the entire organization. The Prime Minister serves as the head of the Government Offices agency.

== Tasks and leadership ==
=== Tasks ===
The Government Offices are tasked with preparing government matters and otherwise assisting the government and its ministers in their work.

=== Leadership ===
The Prime Minister is the head of the Government Offices. The Prime Minister appoints one of the cabinet ministers as a deputy to serve as the head of the Government Offices when the Prime Minister is unavailable. The deputy also assumes the role of head of the Government Offices to the extent determined by the Prime Minister. If both the Prime Minister and the deputy are unavailable, the duties of the head are carried out by the person appointed by either the Prime Minister or the deputy.

In the day-to-day management of the Government Offices, the Prime Minister is assisted by a state secretary in the Prime Minister's Office, a permanent secretary (förvaltningschef), and a director-general for legal affairs (rättschef) in the Prime Minister's Office.

The permanent secretary is responsible for the overall planning of the Government Offices, as well as for the budget and follow-up. The permanent secretary is also responsible for administrative matters that involve multiple ministries or committees across different policy areas. Additionally, the permanent secretary is in charge of the personnel policy within the Government Offices, except for matters related to the allocation of workplace environment responsibilities. The permanent secretary may issue guidelines and provide advice within their area of responsibility.

The director-general for legal affairs in the Prime Minister's Office is responsible for coordinating legal and linguistic matters within the Government Offices to ensure consistency and high quality in legislation and administration. The director-general for legal affairs may issue handbooks, guidelines, and advice within their area of responsibility. Such materials may also be directed to government agencies. The director-general for legal affairs is the publisher of the Swedish Code of Statutes.

The head of a ministry is the cabinet minister appointed by the Prime Minister according to Chapter 7, Section 1 of the Instrument of Government. Senior officials in the ministries include state secretaries, the state secretary for foreign affairs, directors-general for administrative affairs (expeditionschef), and directors-general for legal affairs. Senior officials in the Prime Minister's Office include state secretaries, the permanent secretary, director-general for legal affairs, the EU chief, head of human resources, the special senior official for crisis management, and the national security advisor (nationella säkerhetsrådgivaren). Senior officials also include directors-general for trade policy (utrikesråd) in the Ministry for Foreign Affairs, the head of budget and financial advisers (finansråd) in the Ministry of Finance, and the planning director in the Ministry of Justice.

== Organisation ==
In the Government Offices, the following are included:

- Prime Minister's Office (SB)
- Ministry of Justice (Ju)
- Ministry for Foreign Affairs (UD)
- Ministry of Defence (Fö)
- Ministry of Health and Social Affairs (S)
- Ministry of Finance (Fi)
- Ministry of Education and Research (U)
- Ministry of Climate and Enterprise (KN)
- Ministry of Culture (Ku)
- Ministry of Employment (A)
- Ministry of Rural Affairs and Infrastructure (LI)
- Government Offices' Office for Administrative Affairs (Regeringskansliets förvaltningsavdelning, FA)

== Location ==
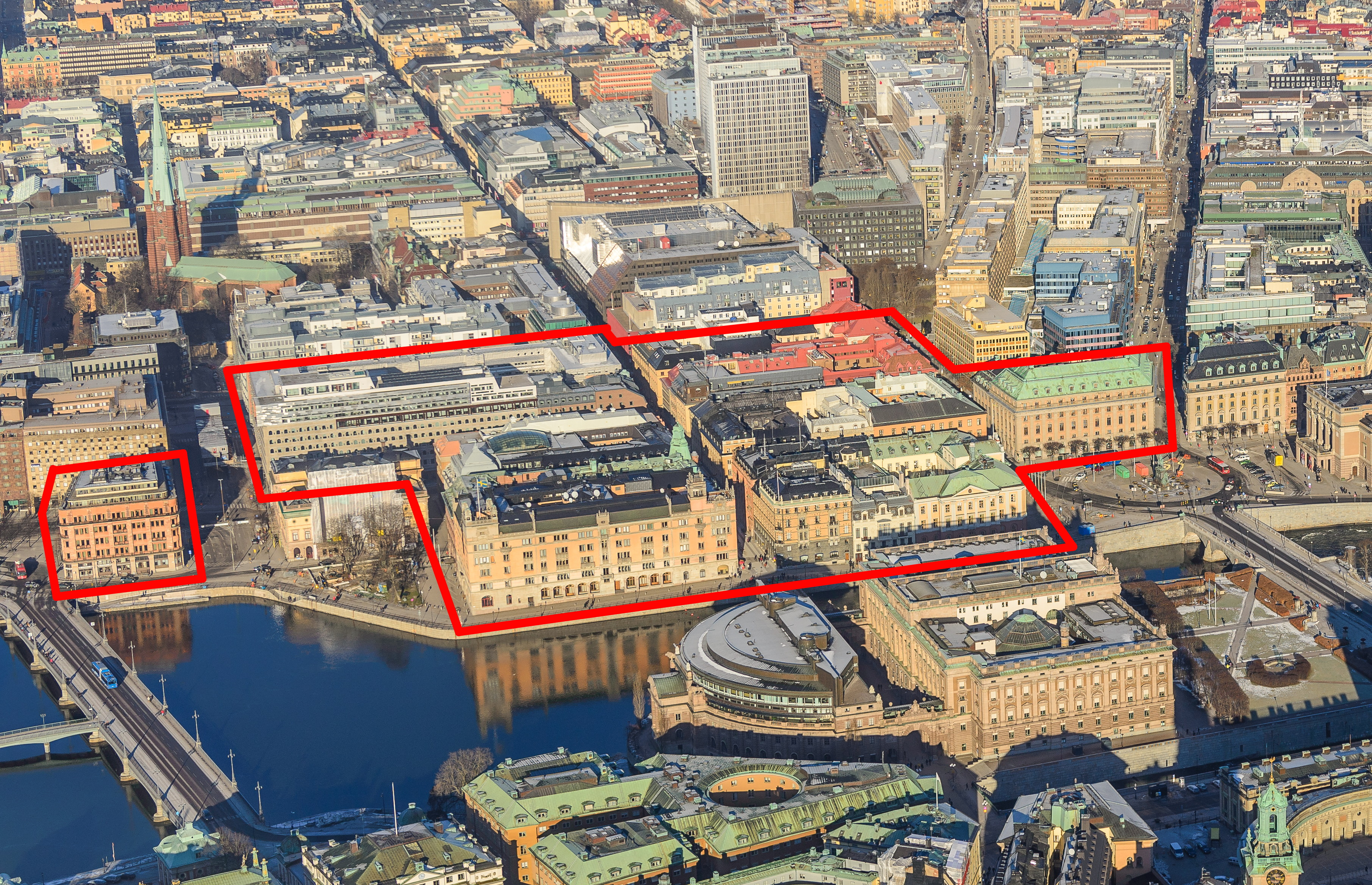
The Government Quarter of Stockholm

In the mid-1960s, planning began for an expansion of the Government Offices in the southern Klara district. The Parliament had vacated its building on Helgeandsholmen for several years, and in 1975, it decided to move back to its "own building." This prompted the acceleration of plans for the ministry expansion, as Parliament needed to use the chancery building (Kanslihuset). In 1981, the Prime Minister's Office and the Ministry of Justice moved out of the chancery and into Rosenbad. Prior to this, several ministries had already relocated from Gamla stan to other premises. After 1981, the remaining ministries in Gamla stan moved across Stockholms ström to southern Klara. The Ministry of Education was the last to relocate, in 1993. In 2008, parts of the Government Offices moved into the former Central Post Office Building on Mäster Samuelsgatan/Vasagatan. After all these relocations, the entire Government Offices is now situated north of Stockholms ström—gathered together but still spread across different buildings. Most ministries, the Prime Minister's Office, and the Government Offices Office for Administrative Affairs (Regeringskansliets förvaltningsavdelning) are connected through an underground tunnel system.
