= State secretary (Sweden) =

Political office in Sweden

State secretary (Swedish: statssekreterare) is the title of the senior political appointee, second in rank to the cabinet minister (Swedish: Statsråd) in charge of the ministry. Unlike ministers, state secretaries are not members of the government.

Each cabinet minister is appointed a state secretary to help with administrative duties. Some cabinet ministers of higher rank, like the prime minister and the minister for finance, have more than one state secretary. If a minister dies or resigns, or if a government changes, the state secretary also turns in their resignation.

For historical reasons, the state secretary in the Ministry for Foreign Affairs has another title (Swedish: kabinettssekreterare, in English literally "cabinet secretary"). State secretaries tend to, more often than ministers, hail from a fixed civil servant background or a professional background relevant to the area of responsibility of their ministry.

== See also ==
- Secretary of state
- Ministerial governance
