= Erlander =

Erlander is a Swedish surname. Notable people with the surname include:

- Aina Erlander (1902–1990), Swedish lecturer wife of Tage
- Sven Erlander (1934–2021), Swedish mathematician and academic
- Tage Erlander (1901–1985), Swedish politician and statesman, Prime Minister of Sweden from 1946 to 1969
