= Gunnar Hedlund =

Swedish politician (1900–1989)

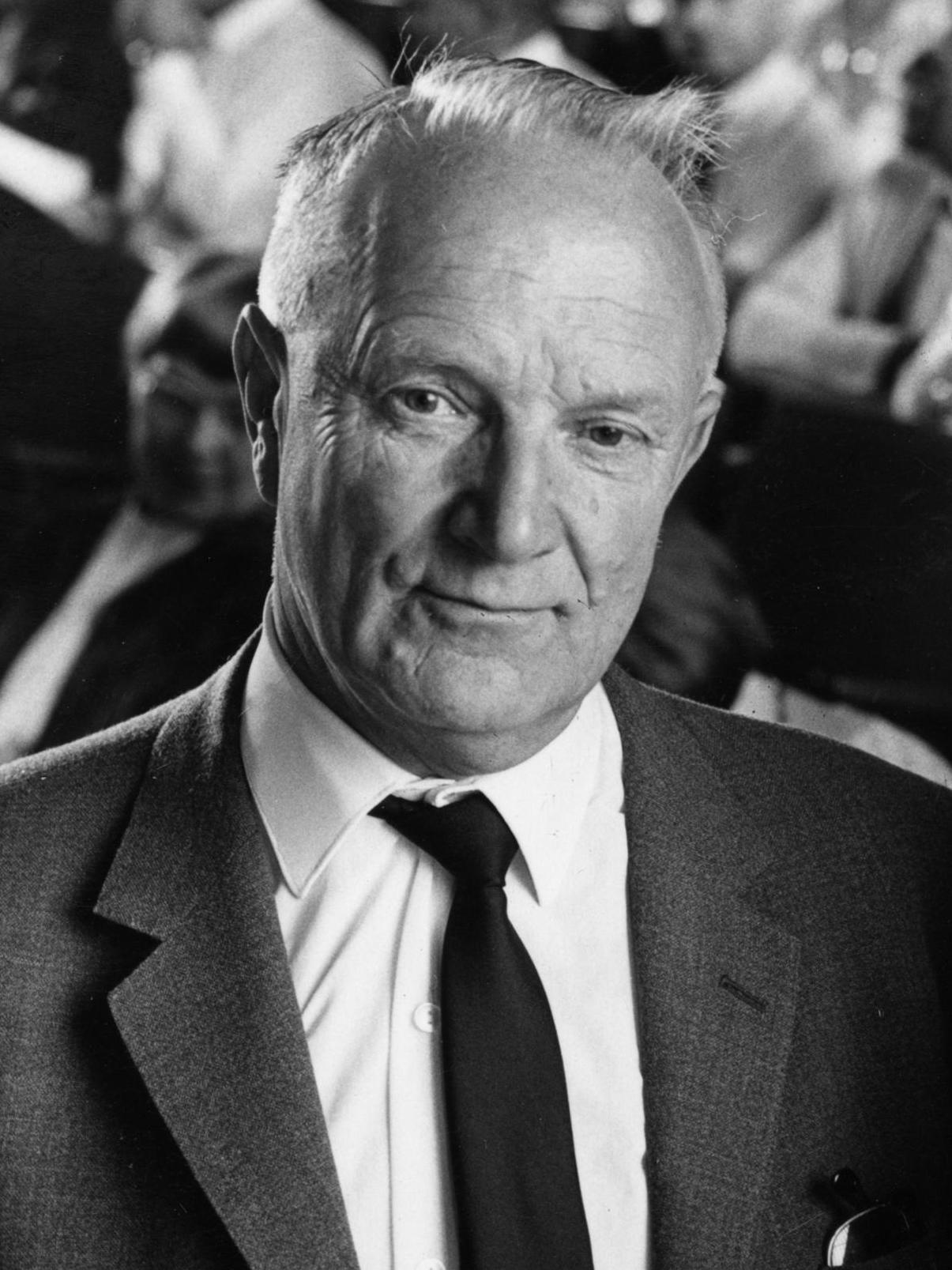
- Hedlund in 1966

Minister of the Interior
- In office 1 October 1951 – 31 October 1957
- Prime Minister: Tage Erlander
- Preceded by: Eije Mossberg
- Succeeded by: Rune B. Johansson

Leader of the Centre Party
- In office 20 June 1949 – 21 June 1971
- Preceded by: Axel Pehrsson-Bramstorp
- Succeeded by: Thorbjörn Fälldin

Personal details
- Born: 1 October 1900 Sollefteå, Sweden
- Died: 26 November 1989 (aged 89) Stockholm, Sweden
- Party: Centre Party

Gunnar Hedlund (1 September 1900 – 26 November 1989) was a Swedish politician and jurist who served as Minister of the Interior from 1951 to 1957. From 1949 to 1971, he led the Centre Party (C), playing a crucial role in transforming the rural-focused interest group into a broader center-right party.

== Biography ==
Hedlund was born in Helgum, Sollefteå Municipality, Ångermanland. In 1926, he became a member of the municipal council of Helgum, and became its chairman in 1930. He was very active in associations connected with silviculture. In 1938, he defended a dissertation at Uppsala University and became Juris Doctor.

In 1942, he was elected to the Riksdag’s Second Chamber, representing Västernorrland as a member of The Farmers’ League, (Swedish: Bondeförbundet), later known as the Centre Party after 1957. In 1948, long-time party leader Axel Pehrsson-Bramstorp suffered a cerebral hemorrhage and, as newly-elected vice party chairman, Hedlund became acting party leader before being formally elected chairman the following year.

In 1951, the Centre Party entered into a coalition government with the Social Democrats, with Hedlund becoming Minister of the Interior, succeeding Eije Mossberg.

The Social Democrats, led by Prime Minister Tage Erlander, wanted a new, compulsory contributory pension plan to be superimposed on the existing basic "people's pension". The Centre Party opposed this compulsory approach, favoring voluntary solutions or other alternatives, as the measure was highly controversial and created a deep divide between the coalition partners.

As the dispute over the pension reform escalated, continued cooperation in the government proved impossible. The Centre Party decided to leave the coalition, leading to a government crisis and the resignation of the cabinet in October 1957. The crisis eventually resulted in a snap election in 1958, which was largely dominated by the pension issue.

The Centre Party grew steadily from 1958 and, in 1968, it became the second-largest party in Sweden.

In the 1970 general election, Hedlund was initially open to the idea of forming another coalition with the Social Democrats in order for them to stay in power. However, he became an opponent of Social Democratic leader and prime minister Olof Palme during the election campaign, and the coalition never happened.

In 1971, Hedlund resigned as chairman and was succeeded by Thorbjörn Fälldin. Hedlund retained a seat in the Riksdag until 1976.

In retirement, he met for dinners and political talks with his former political rival, Liberal leader Bertil Ohlin.

== Awards and decorations ==
- (Sweden) Commander Grand Cross of the Order of the Polar Star (23 November 1955)
- Illis quorum (1984)

Party political offices
Preceded by Axel Pehrsson-Bramstorp	Chairman of the Centre Party of Sweden; 1949—1971	Succeeded by Thorbjörn Fälldin
