= Tage Erlander =

Prime Minister of Sweden from 1946 to 1969

His Excellency Tage Erlander
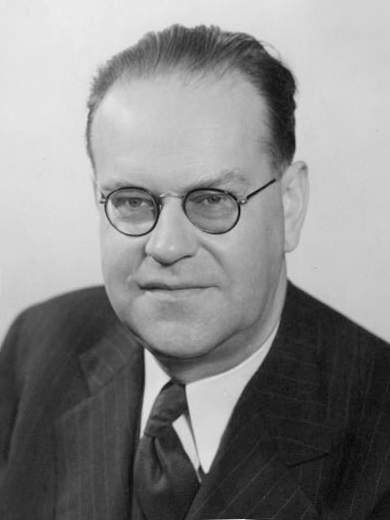
- Erlander in 1949

25th Prime Minister of Sweden
- In office 11 October 1946 – 14 October 1969
- Monarchs: Gustaf V (1946–1950); Gustaf VI Adolf (1950–1969)
- Preceded by: Per Albin Hansson; Östen Undén (acting)
- Succeeded by: Olof Palme

Leader of the Social Democratic Party
- In office 11 October 1946 – 1 October 1969
- Preceded by: Per Albin Hansson
- Succeeded by: Olof Palme

Minister of Education and Ecclesiastical Affairs
- In office 31 July 1945 – 11 October 1946
- Prime Minister: Per Albin Hansson
- Preceded by: Georg Andrén
- Succeeded by: Josef Weijne

Personal details
- Born: Tage Fritjof Erlander; 13 June 1901 Ransäter, Sweden
- Died: 21 June 1985 (aged 84) Huddinge, Sweden
- Party: Social Democrat
- Height: 6 ft 4 in (1.92 m)
- Spouse: Aina Andersson (m. 1930)
- Children: Sven Erlander; Bo Erlander
- Education: Lund University
- Cabinet: Erlander I cabinet: Erlander II cabinet; Erlander III cabinet
- Awards: Illis quorum, 1984

Tage Fritjof Erlander (Swedish: [ˈtɑ̂ːgɛ ɛˈɭǎnːdɛr]; 13 June 1901 – 21 June 1985) was a Swedish politician and statesman who served as Prime Minister of Sweden and leader of the Social Democratic Party from 1946 to 1969. During his record-long premiership, Erlander was an architect of the "Swedish Model" and oversaw a major expansion of the welfare state (Folkhemmet), marked by social equality, economic growth, and the development of extensive public services. Referred to as "Sweden’s longest prime minister" for both his towering height and his unprecedented 23-year tenure as head of government, (Note: Urho Kekkonen, President of Finland from 1956 to 1982, was in power for over 25 years. However, he was a head of state, while Erlander was a head of government, and although Kekkonen won elections in Finland, he has been described as an autocrat.) he was known for his moderation, pragmatism, self-ironic humour, and modesty.

Born into poverty in Ransäter, Erlander later studied at Lund University. He was elected to Lund's municipal council in 1930 and, in 1932, was elected as a Member of the Riksdag. Appointed as a member of the World War II coalition government in 1944, Erlander rose unexpectedly to the leadership upon the death of Prime Minister Per Albin Hansson in October 1946, maintaining the position of the Social Democrats as the dominant party in the country. Known for his moderation and pragmatism, Erlander often sought approval from the liberal-conservative opposition for his policies, de facto dropping all pretences of wide-scale nationalizations whilst introducing reforms such as universal health insurance, pension additions, and a growing public sector, although stopping short of raising tax levels above the average OECD levels at the time. Until the 1960s, income taxes were lower in Sweden than in the United States.

For most of his time in power, Erlander ran a minority government of the Social Democrats. From 1951 to 1957, he instead ran a coalition with the Farmers' League. For most of his time in office, the Social Democrats held a majority of seats in the upper house (Swedish: Första Kammaren), allowing Erlander to remain in power following the 1956 general election, when the right-wing parties won a majority. A snap election in 1958 then reversed this result.

In foreign policy, he initially sought an alliance of Nordic countries, but without success, instead maintaining strict neutrality while spending heavily on the military (but ultimately rejecting nuclear capability and signing the nuclear non-proliferation treaty in 1968). Erlander's mandate coincided with the post–World War II economic expansion, in Sweden known as the record years, in which Sweden saw its economy grow to one of the ten strongest in the world, and subsequently joined the G10.

In the 1968 general election, he won his seventh and most successful victory, with the Social Democrats winning an absolute majority of the popular vote and seats in the lower chamber (Andra Kammaren). Erlander resigned the following year during a process of major constitutional reform, and was succeeded by his long-time protégé and friend Olof Palme. He continued to serve as a member of the Riksdag until he resigned in 1973. Afterwards, Erlander continued to speak on political matters and published his memoirs. He died in 1985. He was considered one of the most popular leaders in the world by the end of the 1960s, and one of the most popular prime ministers in the history of Sweden.

== Early life and education ==
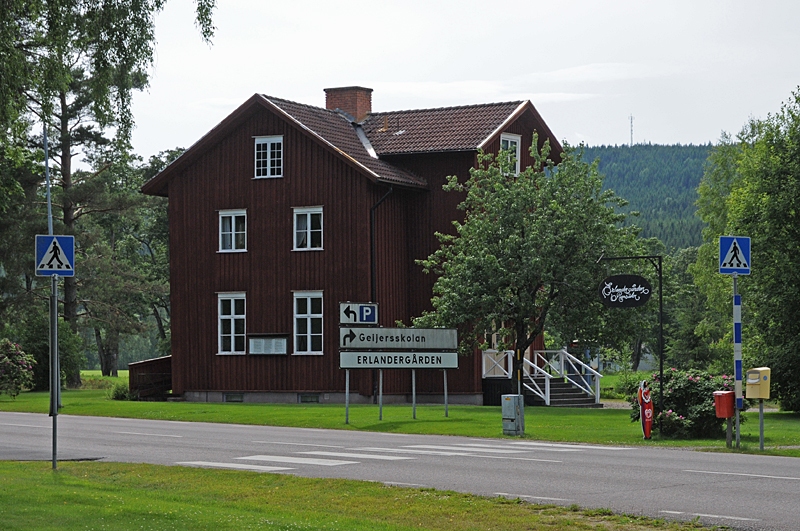
Erlandergården, Erlander's childhood home and schoolhouse, now a museum

Tage Fritjof (Note: Some biographers have spelled Erlander's middle name as Fritiof or Frithiof) Erlander was born in Ransäter, Värmland County on June 13, 1901, on the top floor of the house today known as Erlandergården. His parents were Alma Erlander (née Nilsson) and Erik Gustaf Erlander. (Note: Erik Gustaf Erlander was originally named Erik Gustaf Andersson (the surname Andersson being a patronymic referring to his father Anders Erlandsson), but he later changed his surname to Erlander, which his son Tage and his descendants kept.) Erik Gustaf was a teacher and cantor who married Alma Nilsson in 1893. Erlander had an older brother, Janne Gustaf Erlander (born 1893), an older sister, Anna Erlander (born 1894), and a younger sister, Dagmar Erlander (born 1904). Erlander's paternal grandfather, Anders Erlandsson, worked as a smith at an ironworks, and his maternal grandfather was a farmer who held a public office in his home municipality. On his maternal grandmother's side, Erlander descended from Forest Finns, who migrated to Värmland from the Finnish province of Savonia in the 17th century.

According to Erlander, his father was very religious, supportive of universal suffrage, pro-free market, anti-trade union, and liberal. Erlander also said that his father became increasingly anti-socialist as he aged, speculating that his father was unhappy with his son's eventual election to parliament as a member of a socialist party.

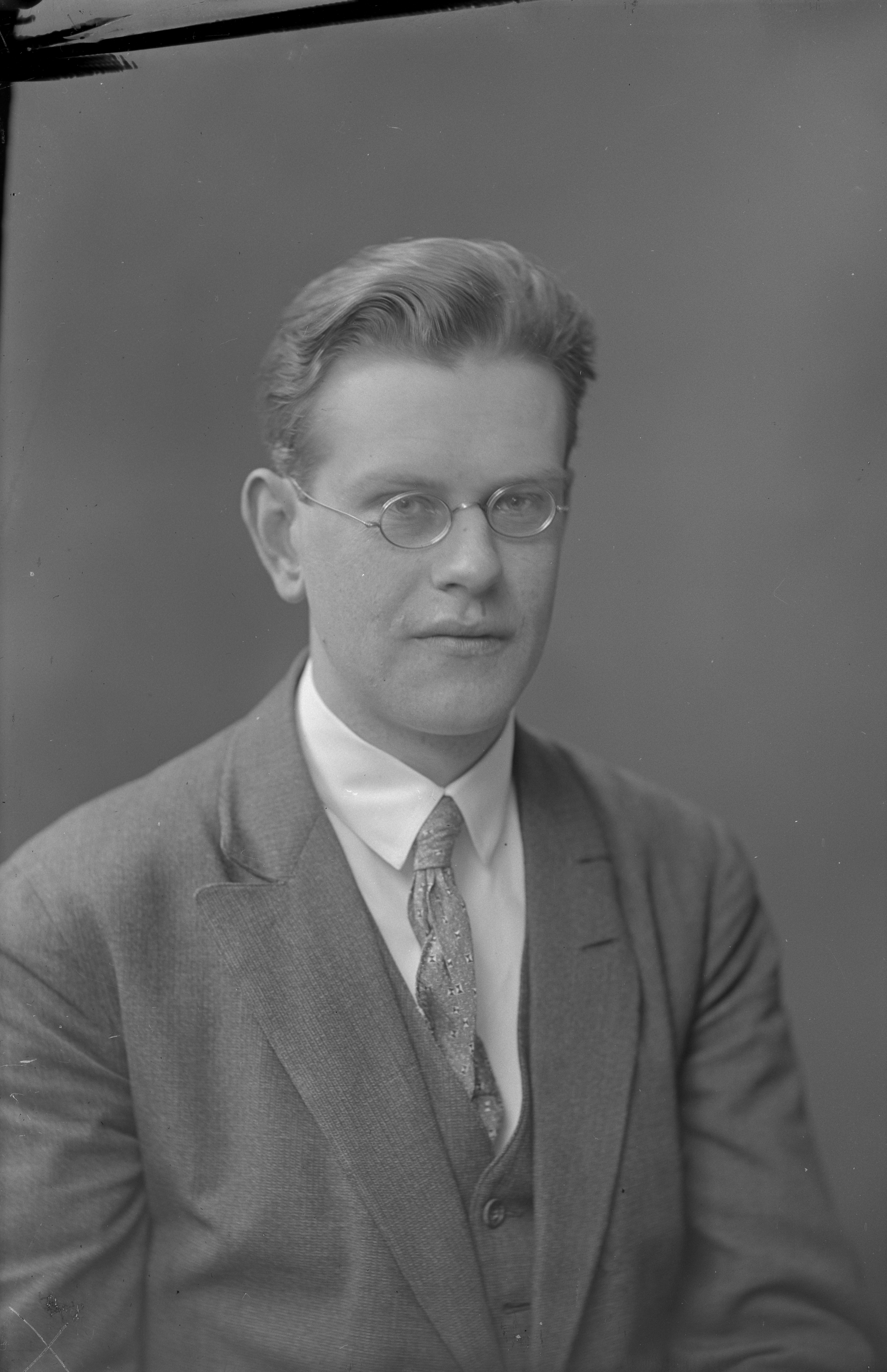
Erlander in 1925, photographed by Per Bagge

The Erlander family was initially poor, although Erik Gustaf was able to make money through selling homemade furniture and exporting lingonberries to Germany. As a child, Erlander lived on the second floor of Erlandergården, and attended school on the first floor. He later attended schools in Karlstad, living in a boarding house for children of clergymen. He was reportedly a good student in high school.

From 1921 to 1922, Erlander carried out his mandatory military service at a machine gun factory in Malmslätt. In September 1920, his father enrolled him at Lund University rather than Uppsala University, as he felt Lund was more affordable. As a student at Lund, Erlander was heavily involved in student politics and met many politically radical students. He was exposed to societal and economic injustices, and began to identify with socialism. Beginning in autumn of 1923, Erlander read the writings of Karl Marx. He met his future wife, fellow student Aina Andersson. They began working together in the chemistry department in 1923. He also met and studied natural sciences with fellow student and future physicist Torsten Gustafson, who would later serve as an advisor on nuclear affairs to Erlander during his premiership. In addition to his scientific studies, Erlander also read some economics, and was an active member of Wermlands Nation, where he was elected Kurator (head executive) in 1922. In 1926, he led student opposition to celebrations of the 250th anniversary of the Battle of Lund. He graduated with a degree in political science and economics in 1928.

From 1928 to 1929 he completed his compulsory military service in the Signal Corps and eventually went on to become a reserve Lieutenant. Erlander's first major job was a member of the editorial staff of the encyclopedia Svensk upplagsbok from 1928 to 1938. In 1930 Tage and Aina married, although in his memoirs he stated that they both opposed the institution. They spent their first few years of marriage apart, as Erlander was working in Lund while Aina was working in Karlshamn, and they only saw each other on holidays. Their first son, Sven Bertil Erlander, was born on May 25, 1934, in Halmstad, and their second son, Bo Gunnar Erlander, was born in Lund on May 16, 1937.

== Early political career ==
=== MP and state secretary ===
Erlander (back left row, second from left) with the Lund Academic Association in 1930, photographed by Per Bagge

Erlander joined the Social Democratic Party in 1928, and was elected to the Lund municipal council in 1930. He was involved in improving poor city housing, lowering unemployment, and installing a new bathhouse. He served on the council until 1938.

He was elected as a member of the Riksdag (parliament) in 1932, for Fyrstadskretsen, which he would represent until 1944. He began making political connections, and attracted the attention of prominent Social Democratic politician and Minister for Social Affairs Gustav Möller. In 1938, Möller appointed Erlander as a state secretary at the Ministry of Social Affairs. After Erlander became a state secretary, he and Aina, with their children, moved to Stockholm. In 1941, Sweden's Population Commission was created under Erlander's leadership. He served as its chairman, and it put forward proposals on grants and regulations of daycare centers and play schools.

As a state secretary, Erlander was one of the most senior officials responsible for the establishment of internment camps in Sweden during World War II. Various types of camps were set up, primarily to house and detain refugees and foreigners arriving to Sweden, to house interned German and Allied military personnel (e.g. pilots who had crashed in Sweden), and to replace the military draft for pro-Soviet Communists and others who were viewed as unreliable and hostile to Sweden's political system; instead of being stationed in the armed forces, they were conscripted to work camps organized to build infrastructure. Writing in his memoirs in the 1970s, Erlander downplayed his knowledge of the camps, as, according to journalist Niclas Sennerteg, Erlander knew about their existence long before he claimed and was integral to their design and function.

In 1942, Erlander and Möller initiated a nationwide census of the Swedish Travelers, a branch of the Romani people.

=== In Hansson's government ===
Erlander ascended to Prime Minister Per Albin Hansson's World War II coalition cabinet in 1944 as a minister without portfolio, a post he held until the next year. Following the 1944 general election, he began representing the Malmöhus County.

In the summer of 1945, as part of Hansson's post-war cabinet, he became minister of education and ecclesiastical affairs. It has been suggested that Erlander was chosen for the position due to his lack of experience with educational policies, as he was not associated with factional divides regarding debates over Sweden's educational system. Erlander was initially skeptical about accepting the role, but he eventually grew accustomed to it, despite not holding the office very long.

Erlander largely left ecclesiastical matters to other politicians, instead focusing on tangible educational reforms. Influenced by his experiences at Lund University, he proposed larger investments in research and higher education. He was a major driving force behind successful laws providing free school lunches and textbooks. On October 29, 1945, Erlander was visited by Austro-Swedish nuclear physicist Lise Meitner, to discuss Sweden investing in nuclear physics and technology following the atomic bombings of Hiroshima and Nagasaki. In 1946, Möller introduced a new pension proposal, a uniform one which would lift all pensioners above the poverty line, which Erlander and Minister for Finance Ernst Wigforss opposed, but it passed in the Riksdag.

At the 1945 Social Democratic party conference, Per Nyström presented a motion to update Swedish schooling. The conference was split on how much schooling should be mandatory, with some arguing it should only extend to elementary school. Despite the disagreements, the conference requested the party executive create a special committee to develop school programs. The committee was divided on whether students should be separated by abilities, a practice known as streaming. It never reached a consensus, but finished a draft for a new school program requiring nine years of universal mandatory education, although it was never submitted to the party. In 1946, Erlander, as minister of education, created a second committee, the Schools Commission, despite the first one being still active. This new committee, chaired by Erlander, was composed mainly of appointed party members. By 1948, after Erlander had become prime minister, the second committee also proposed nine years of mandatory schooling, but the question of when to begin streaming was still debated.

=== Succeeding Hansson ===
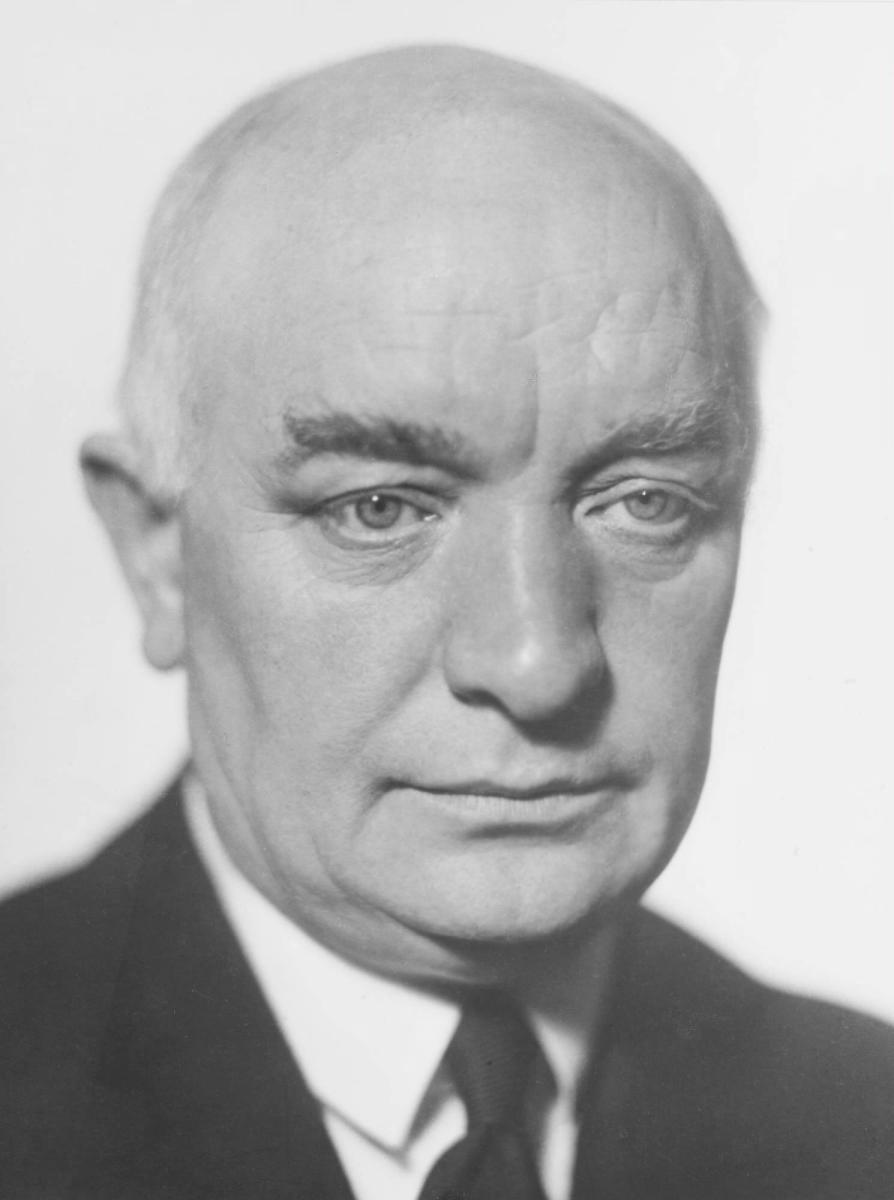
The death of Per Albin Hansson unexpectedly led to the selection of Erlander as prime minister

Prime Minister Hansson suddenly died on October 6, 1946. Foreign Minister Östen Undén was chosen to serve as interim prime minister until a successor could be chosen. Erlander and his wife were in Lund when Hansson died, and when they returned to the Grand Hôtel, they were informed of his death by Minister of Defense Allan Vougt.

On October 6, Hansson's cabinet and the Social Democrat executive committee met, and the executive committee scheduled a full board party meeting for October 9, as did the Social Democratic party caucus. Erlander first learned of his possible selection as prime minister and party leader on October 7. Erlander himself was reluctant and had little interest in becoming prime minister, saying he would only do so if the desire from the party was strong enough.

At the October 9 meeting, the board voted 15 to 11 in favor of Erlander becoming prime minister, and the caucus voted 94 to 72 to make Erlander party leader. The choice was considered surprising and controversial, and some believed Gustav Möller, who received the 72 remaining votes, was Hansson's obvious successor, including Möller himself. The choice of Erlander has been attributed to younger party members wanting a younger generation to lead and Erlander being viewed as a greater figure of change, as he was experienced in areas seen as important to Social Democrats such as social and educational policies, and was able to foster cooperation between people with differing views.

== Premiership and party leadership ==
=== First government: 1946–1951 ===
==== Ascension and first actions ====
After Erlander was chosen as prime minister, Hansson's cabinet all submitted their resignations, as was routine. King Gustaf V met Erlander on October 13, asking him to form a new government. Erlander asked all cabinet members to withdraw their resignations.

Upon meeting Erlander at Drottningholm and asking him to form a new government, Gustaf encouragingly told Erlander that times were difficult, and that a younger man serving as prime minister was best for Sweden. He also assured Erlander that "things would work out well", and that the two of them would get along as initially he had some disagreements with Per Albin Hansson, who was ideologically a republican.

In the two years leading up to the 1948 election, Erlander visited numerous Social Democratic organizations across the country to solidify his support and explain party policies. Within his first 365 days in office, he made between seventy and eighty public appearances outside of Stockholm. Social Democratic newspapers began writing positively about Erlander‘s speaking events. Nonsocialist newspapers became more critical of Erlander, first casting him as an irrelevant figure, then as an unreliable and uninspiring tactician. These perceived attacks made Erlander more popular within the party.

==== First cabinet ====
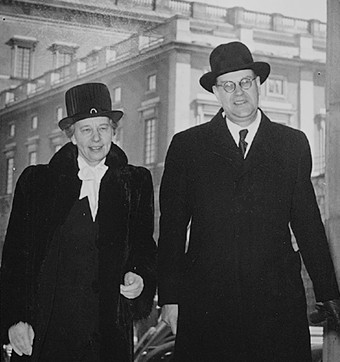
Erlander with Karin Kock (left) in 1947

Erlander inherited 14 ministers from Hansson. Overall, Erlander allowed his cabinet ministers a great deal of freedom, as he did not want to become overly involved in coordinating them daily, but he did monitor them. Over his premiership, Hansson's ministers slowly left the government. Minister of Commerce Gunnar Myrdal implemented policies such as selling the Soviet Union machinery on a fifteen-year credit and a 17% appreciation of the Swedish krona. The former, conceived by his predecessor, was viewed as less economically attractive due to stronger trading partners existing post-war, and the latter worsened Sweden's trade deficit. Due to the backlash, he resigned in 1947, becoming the first minister to leave Erlander's government.

Erlander appointed Josef Weijne to replace him as minister of education and ecclesiastical affairs. In 1947, Karin Kock became the first woman in Swedish to hold a cabinet position when she became a minister without portfolio, and in 1948 she became minister of supply. Kock was suggested by Riksdag member Ulla Wohlin, who would serve in Erlander's third cabinet as Sweden's third female cabinet minister. Kock left the post in 1949, and the office was abolished the following year.

Weijne died in office in 1951, and Erlander appointed Hildur Nygren to succeed him, making her the second woman in Sweden to become a cabinet minister.

==== Election of 1948 ====
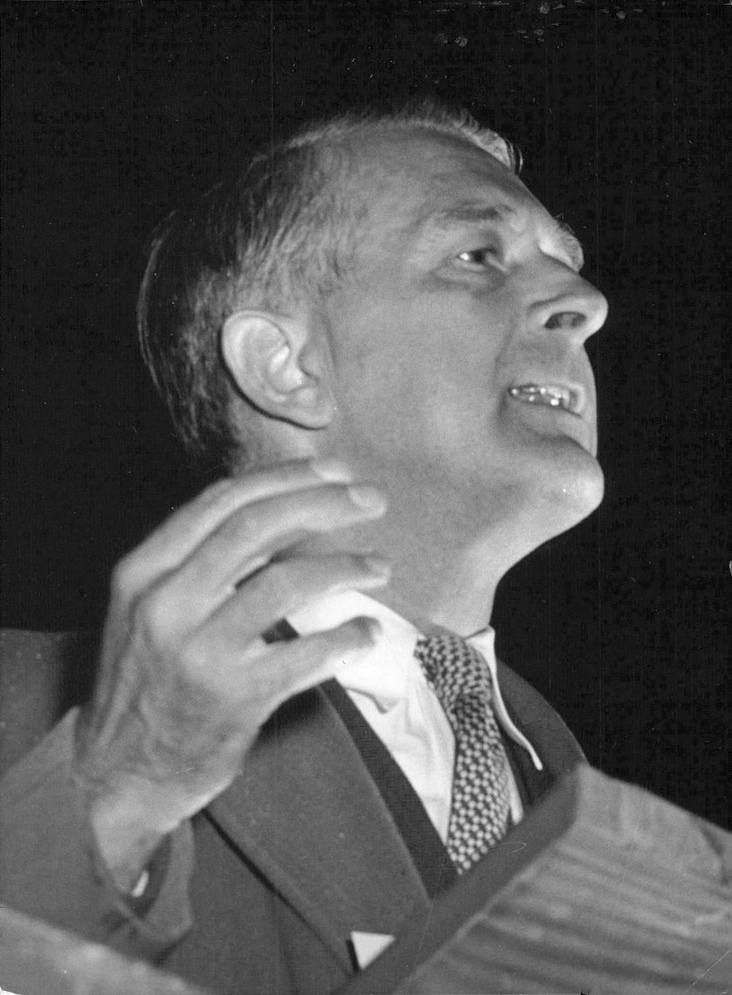
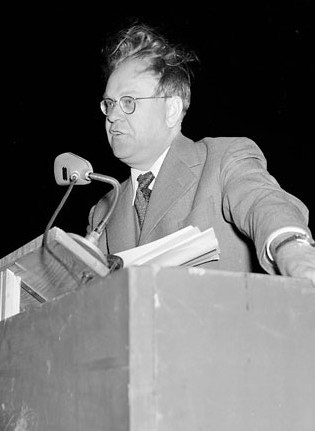
Bertil Ohlin and Erlander during a debate held in September 1952. Their debates are considered among Sweden's most notable.

Going into the 1948 election, Erlander's first as party leader and prime minister, many Social Democrats expected their party to lose, including Erlander's future protégé and later prime minister Ingvar Carlsson. The Liberal People's Party was becoming a major opposition party with their new leader, Bertil Ohlin. During the World War II coalition government, Ohlin had served as Hansson's minister of commerce, but he opposed Hansson's various social policy proposals During Erlander's government he generally came to support many of the Social Democrats' policies. Despite this, Erlander, still partially influenced by Ohlin's opposition to the Hansson government, harbored a strong dislike of the Liberals and their leader. In speeches and during Riksdag debates, Erlander frequently attacked the Liberals with accusations including irresponsibility, opportunism, and irreconcilability. Erlander viewed Ohlin as "stiff, self-righteous, arrogant, bossy, and lacking in principles", while Ohiln wrote in his memoirs that Erlander was "evasive, ungenerous, uncertain, quick to take offense, and a somewhat unfair debater." Their political rivalry is considered one of the most notable in modern Swedish history.

Despite fears, the Social Democrats won 46.13%. In the Andra kammaren ("Second chamber" or lower house) of the Riksdag, the Social Democrats secured 112 out of 230 total seats. The Liberals came in second with 22.8% of the vote, one of their largest victories. Erlander himself had now been elected as a representative of Stockholm County, following his four years a Malmöhus representative.

Following this election, the Social Democrats remained in power, but desired to maintain a long-term majority, so they offered to form a coalition government with the Centre Party. (Note: Named the Farmers' League until 1957. Also previously known as the Agrarian Union or Agrarian Party.) They declined, but this had no impact on Erlander's ability to form a government on time, as the talks were public but informal.

=== Coalition government: 1951–1957 ===
==== Socialist–Centrist cabinet ====
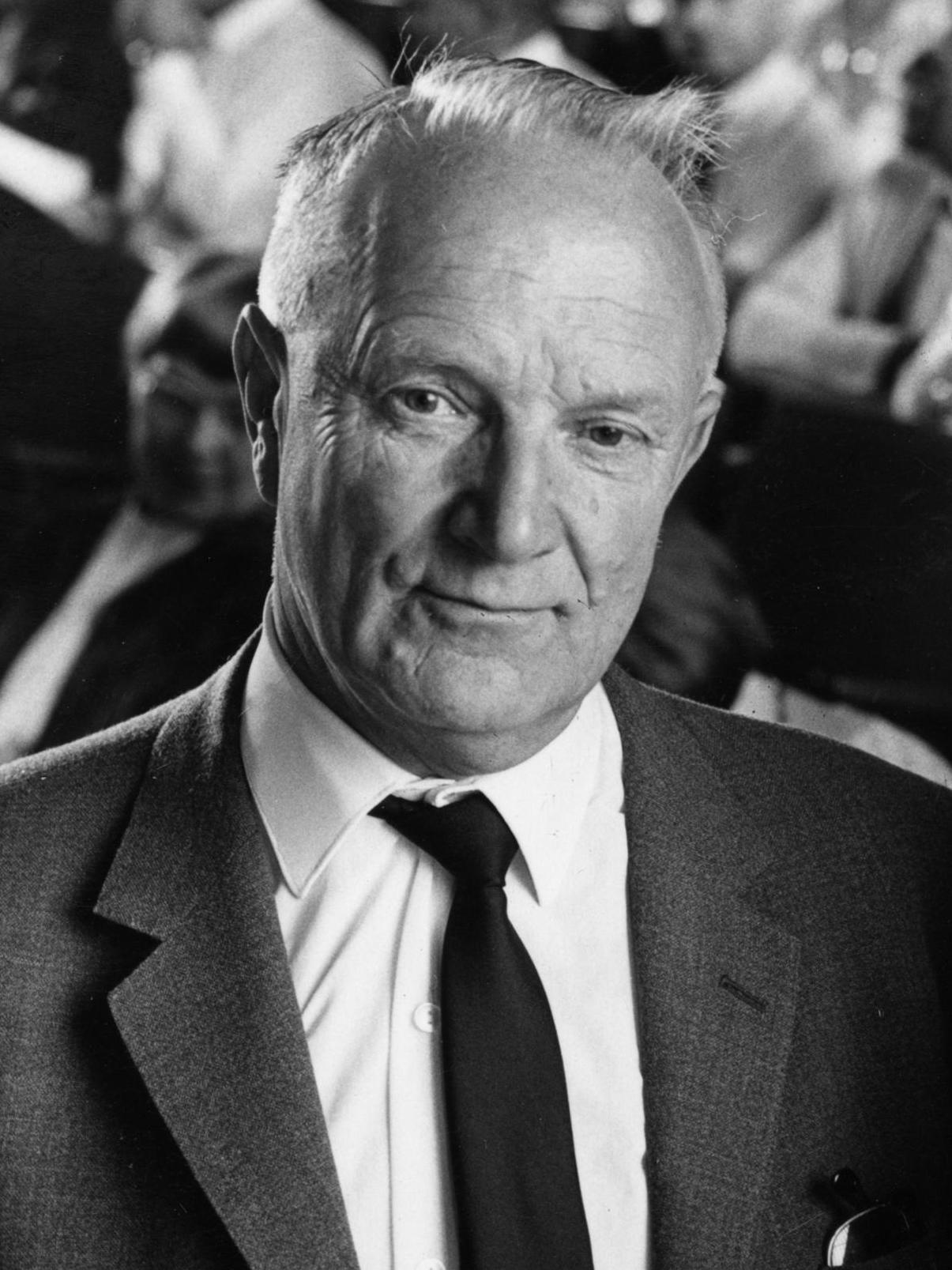
Centrist leader Gunnar Hedlund, Minister for Home Affairs in the coalition government.

In 1951, Erlander formed a coalition with the Centre Party. He added four Centrists to his cabinet that year. His working relationship with the party's leader, Gunnar Hedlund, is known to have been good. Erlander and Hedlund, while disagreeing on some issues, shared a common desire to outmaneuver the Liberals and the Moderate Party. (Note: Named the Right Party until 1969) The voter bases of both parties are also considered to have been similar. Under the coalition, Hedlund became minister for home affairs.

One of the positions that the Centrists demanded be given to one of their own was the minister of education, which had been held by Hildur Nygren since earlier that year. Erlander did not get along with Nygren, and used the negotiations as an excuse to remove her. The coalition government was formed on October 1, 1951.

==== Election of 1952 ====
In the 1952 general election, the Social Democrats won 46%, a slight decrease from the previous election. The Centrists obtained 10.7%, which was also a decrease for them. The Liberals gained 24.4%, an increase from their previous percentage.

==== Gustaf VI Adolf and Haijby scandal ====
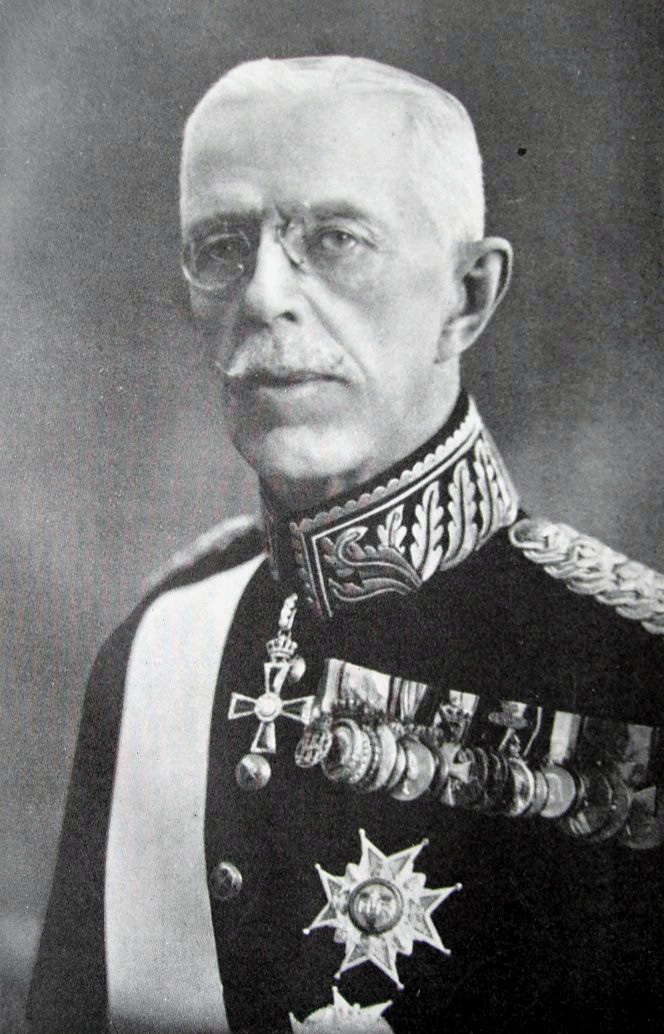
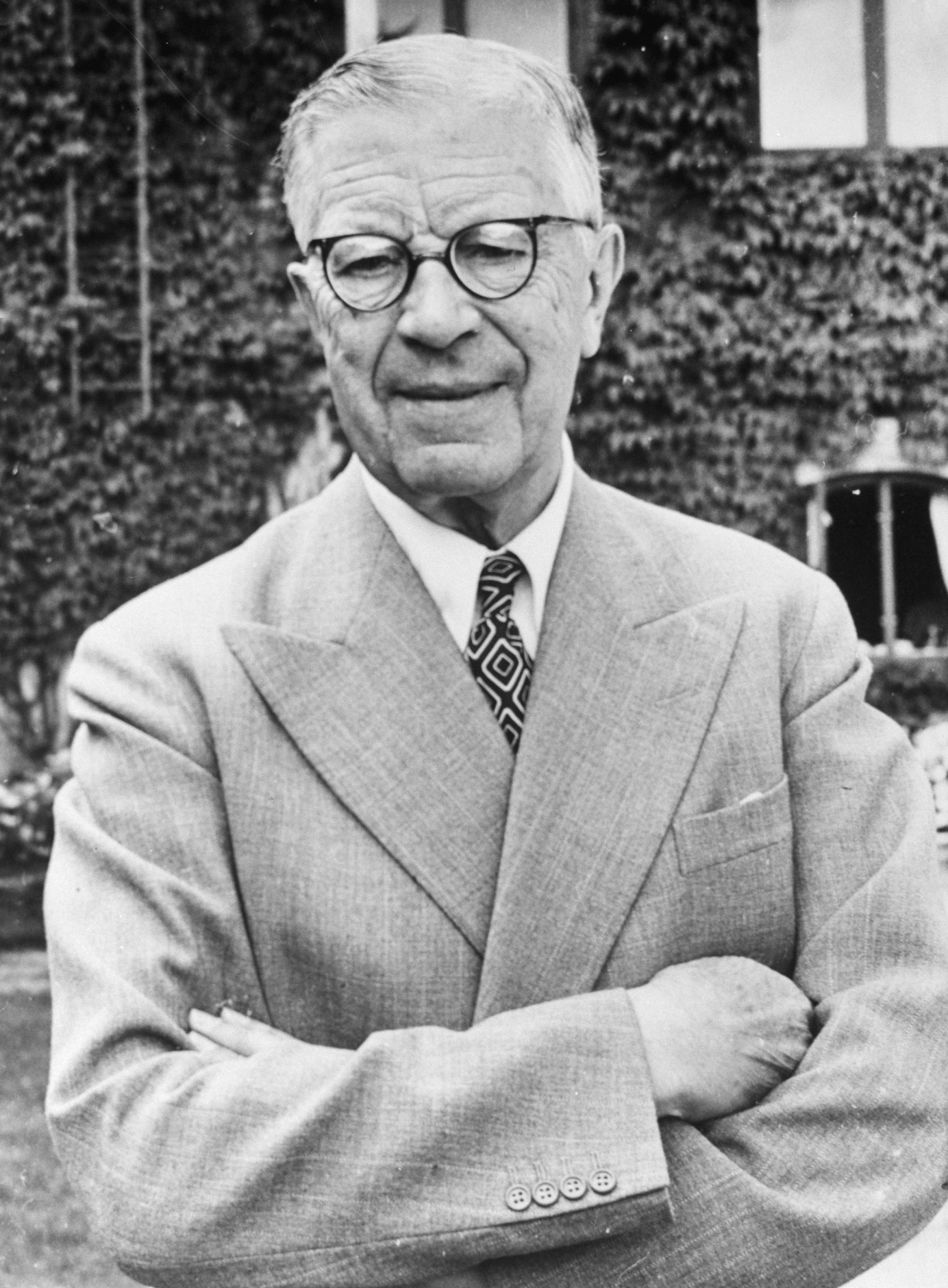
Kings Gustaf V and Gustaf VI Adolf

Erlander served under King Gustaf V for 4 years, and the two had a mutual respect. Gustaf, aged 88 upon Erlander's ascension to the premiership, was not very politically active. In 1950, upon the death of his father, Crown Prince Gustaf VI Adolf became king. Erlander was also on good terms with Gustaf VI, but at times disapproved of the new king's more hands-on involvement in political matters than his father, and during Gustaf VI's time as Crown Prince, Erlander saw him as a "rather stiff individual who lacked perspective".

In 1947, Kurt Haijby, who had previously been arrested multiple times on suspected homosexual acts, wrote a memoir about his experiences, which included previous claims that he had a sexual relationship with Gustaf V. The Stockholm police bought most of the stock to prevent distribution, and the government took charge of the affair. According to Erlander, Minister of the Interior Eije Mossberg opened a cabinet meeting by stating, "The King is homosexual!" to which Wigforss replied, "At his age? How vigorous!" One of the only copies that got out was read by Erlander. He reportedly believed the allegations. According to journalist Maria Schottenius, Erlander later told her of how he was tormented for decades by the "Haijbyskiten" (Swedish: "Haijby shit").

==== Election of 1956 ====
In the 1956 general election, the party won 44.58%, a larger decrease than the previous one. Erlander at one point stated that the setback was due to, among other things, "Christian anti-socialist agitation." Their coalition partners, the Centrists, garnered 9.45%.

==== Pension referendum and coalition collapse ====
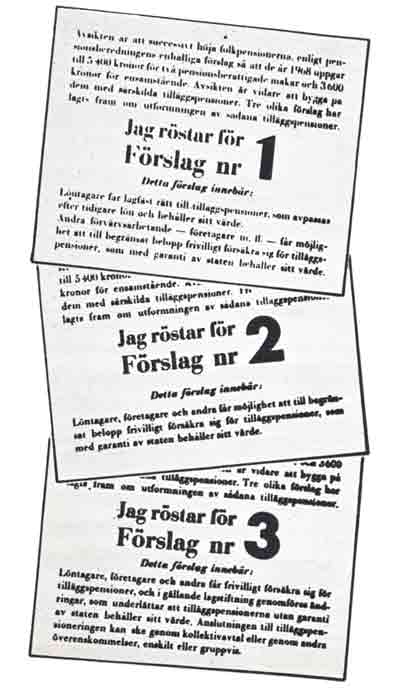
Balots from the 1957 pension referendum

Despite the ideological similarities between the Social Democrats and the Centrists, a major issue was Sweden's proposed pension system. Erlander desired a system that was mandatory for all citizens, while Hedlund wanted the pensions to be voluntary. A referendum on the issue in 1957 included three proposals for pensions systems, one by the Social Democrats, another by the Centrists, and the third by the right. The Social Democrats' proposal won with 45.8% of the vote, while the right's garnered 35.3% and the Centrists' 15%.

As a result of the pension referendum, the coalition dissolved that year, with the Centre Party withdrawing on October 24. Following this, the king facilitated inter-party dialogue, specifically asking about the possibility of the Social Democrats forming a coalition with the three non-socialist parties. Erlander was appointed formateur/informateur, but was very reluctant to create a four-party government. The king then designated the Liberals and Moderates as formateurs, and asked them to explore creating a non-socialist government. The Centrists stated that they were unwilling to join the other two parties in a coalition, and the plans failed. On October 29, Erlander was asked to form a minority government, to which he agreed. Erlander was thus allowed to remain prime minister and formateur, leading a minority government into the next election.

=== Final government: 1957–1969 ===
==== Third cabinet and "the boys" ====
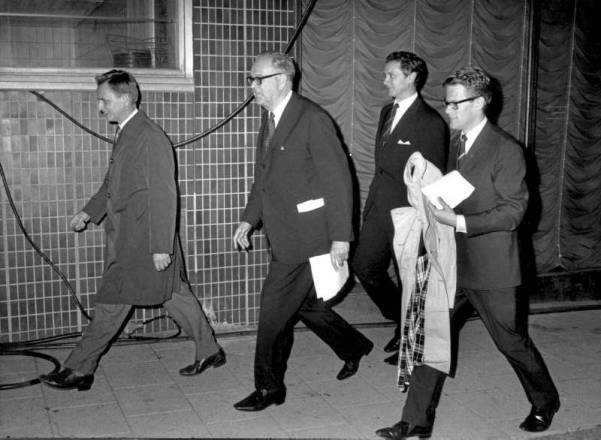
Erlander (left) in 1968, with three of "the boys": Olof Palme (far left), Sten Andersson (right), and Ingvar Carlsson (far right).

On October 31, 1957, Erlander's all-Social Democratic government was sworn in. Nine of the ten cabinet ministries Erlander inherited from Hansson's cabinet existed by the end of Erlander's premiership. Three additional ministries were created, with Erlander's final cabinet having twelve ministries by 1968. Altogether, 57 people served in Erlander's cabinets.

In August 1953, Erlander hired Olof Palme to serve as his personal secretary. In 1963, he ascended to the cabinet as a minister without portfolio. Palme became Minister of Communications in 1965, and in 1967 became Minister of Education. Beginning with Palme, Erlander began to hire a larger group of personal staff, including typists and stenographers, consisting of young Social Democrats such as Palme, Ingvar Carlsson, and Bengt K. Å. Johansson. In the 1960s, Erlander began to call his group of young aides "the boys". Erlander frequently consulted the boys on speeches he planned to make, although according to Olle Svenning, he was rarely satisfied with the speeches they wrote.

==== Election of 1958 and ATP ====
Social Democratic efforts for a universal pension system continued. In 1958, a bill was proposed that would provide uniform, state-administered pensions to all Swedes over the age of 67. Left wing parties supported the bill, while right wing parties opposed it. It was defeated in a vote of 117 against to 111 for. Following this loss, Erlander asked the king to temporarily dissolve the Riksdag and called for a snap election. In the ensuing election, the party won 46.2%, an increase from the 1956 election. This was the third, and, as of 2024, last snap election in Swedish history.

In the spring of 1959, the Social Democratic pension system was again being voted on in the Riksdag. In the second chamber, the vote was evenly split, 115 for and 115 against. Ture Königson, a Liberal, chose to vote in support of the Socialist's proposal. Königson preferred his party's pension plan, but desired a secure future for Sweden's older workers, and reasoned that the Socialists' plan was better than a permanent political stalemate. Through his vote, the smallest possible margin, the pension plan passed. The system, called Allmän tilläggspension (Swedish: "General supplementary pension") or ATP for short, was successful implemented in 1960.

==== Election of 1960 ====
In the 1960 general election, the Social Democrats' percentage of the vote was up to 47.79%, another increase from the previous election. Erlander described the election as an "ideological breakthrough", which allowed the Social Democrats to pursue further reform.

==== Wennerström scandal ====
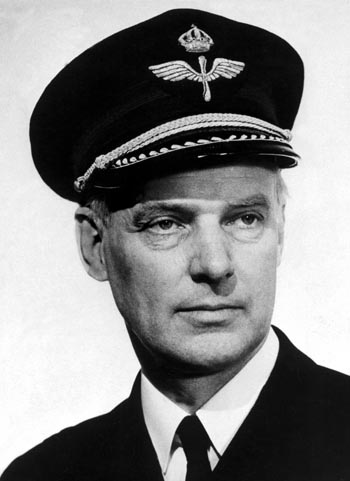
The Soviet-backed espionage of Col. Stig Wennerström would cause one of the biggest scandals of Erlander's premiership

On June 20, 1963, Col. Stig Wennerström was arrested on his way to work, and charged with espionage. He soon admitted to spying for the Soviet Union for 15 years, and it was later estimated that had sold around 160 Swedish defense secrets to the Soviet government. Minister of Defence Sven Andersson had been informed of suspicions against Wennerström four years earlier and had become personally suspicious of him two years earlier, as had Foreign Minister Undén. Erlander, however, had not known about the suspicions until the day Wennerström was arrested. Undén's successor, Foreign Minister Torsten Nilsson informed him via telephone the day of the arrest while Erlander was in a restaurant in Italy on vacation with his wife, and asked him to return to Sweden immediately.

Upon returning to Sweden, in response to criticism over the lack of government coordination, Erlander stated on television that, "It is impossible for the government to be informed of every person who is under suspicion. We need more proof in a democratic society before we can take action." It later surfaced that twice in 1962, meetings were scheduled with Erlander to discuss Wennerström, but the first was canceled due to the minister of Justice being ill, and the second was canceled due to Erlander's schedule being full. Opposition parties demanded a parliamentary investigation, and Bertil Ohlin led the opposition's push for the censure of Sven Andersson and Östen Undén for negligence. In 1964, after two days of debate in the Riksdag, Andersson was not found guilty of gross negligence, and Ohlin dropped plans for a vote of censure. Simultaneously, the lower chamber voted 116 to 105 to clear Undén of negligence charges. Erlander stated that he would regard votes of censure as a question of confidence in his entire cabinet, and that it was "a tragedy" that Wennerström's arrest and trial became a political issue.

Also in 1964, Wennerström was found guilty on three counts of gross espionage, was stripped of his rank, and was ordered to pay the government $98,000 of the $200,000 he was paid by the Soviet government. He was sentenced to life imprisonment. (Note: Wennerdtröm would be eligible for parole in ten years. He was pardoned and released in 1974) The entire arrest, trial, investigation, and scandal took up much of Erlander's energy for almost a year.

==== Election of 1964 ====
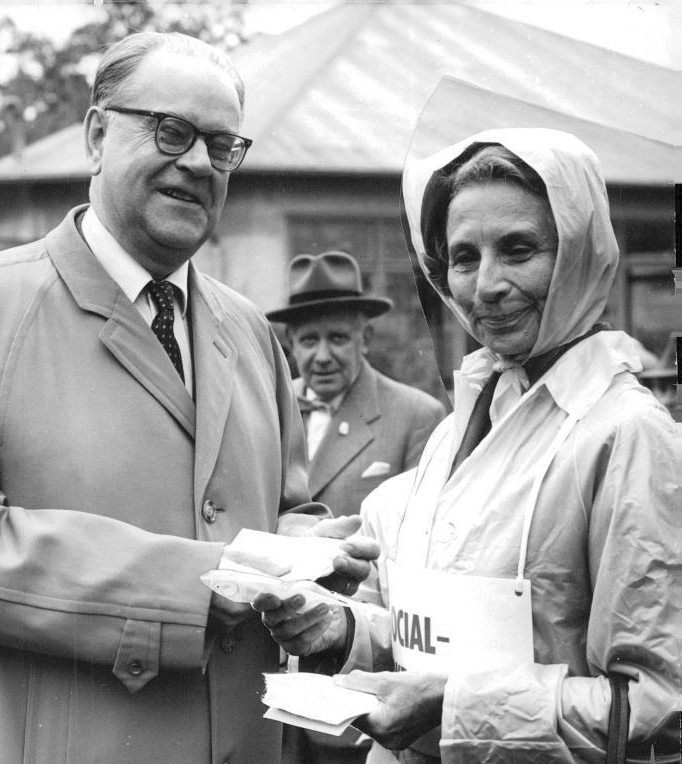
Erlander and Aina with their ballot papers during the 1964 election

In the 1964 general election, the Social Democrats won 47.27% of the vote, a slight decrease overall from 1960, but the party now obtained a majority in the second chamber. The Social Democratic campaign slogan was, "You never had it so good". The Left Party (Note: Named the Communist Party until 1967, when they changed their name to Left Party - The Communists, and in 1990 they chose their current name.) made larger gains that year, as they won 3 new seats in the second chamber (in addition to the 5 they previously won) and were the only party to increase their percentage from the previous election.

==== Traffic change ====
In a 1955 referendum, a proposal was put forward to switch Sweden from left-handed driving to right-handed driving. The referendum results overwhelmingly rejecting the proposal, with 82.9 percent of voters voting no to the switch and only 15.5% in support, although the voter turnout was considered low. Despite the general lack of support, efforts continued well into the next decade. In 1963, the Riksdag voted in a majority to switch traffic to the right side, despite the public's rejection of the idea in the 1955 referendum. This sparked backlash, and in response, Erlander stated, "The referendum was only advisory, after all."

Following the 1963 Riksdag vote, the project began to go underway. Olof Palme, now Minister for Communications (Transport), oversaw the project, which was often seen as a way to bring Sweden in line with the driving standards of most of Europe.

Debates were held over the proposed change, with pro-switch politicians arguing the change would reduce the number of traffic accidents. A massive advertising campaign was carried out to shift public opinion. On September 3, 1967, an event known as Dagen H, Sweden began the drastic change, with an estimated 360,000 street signs needing to be changed overnight. The final cost was expected to exceed 800 million Swedish krona. Initially the number of accidents went down, but the number reached pre-1967 levels by 1969.

==== Unicameral Riksdag ====
In 1954, Erlander met Prime Minister of the United Kingdom Winston Churchill, and the two discussed different electoral systems. Churchill was surprised to learn that Sweden did not have a system of majority voting in single-member constituencies. Erlander explained the reason was because that system would benefit the Social Democrats. Churchill replied, "A statesman must not hesitate to do the right thing, even if it benefits his own party."

In March 1967, Sweden's political parties finally agreed to replace the bicameral Riksdag with a unicameral chamber that would be directly elected. The Första kammaren ("First chamber" or upper house) voted to abolish itself on May 17, 1968, 117 for and 13 against. The Riksdag would fully become unicameral in 1971, after Erlander had retired from the premiership.

==== Republic of Jamtland ====
In 1963, actor Yngve Gamlin humorously declared himself president of the Republic of Jamtland, a breakaway state in Swedish territory. In 1967, Erlander invited Gamlin to Harpsund. However, when discussions did not go the way he hoped they would, Gamlin stole the plug from Erlander's boat, Harpsundsekan.

==== Election of 1968 ====
In the 1968 general election, Erlander's final election as prime minister, his party won 50.1%, the Social Democrats' largest victory under his leadership. They had also obtained a proper majority. This would be the last bicameral election in Sweden.

=== Popularity and public image ===
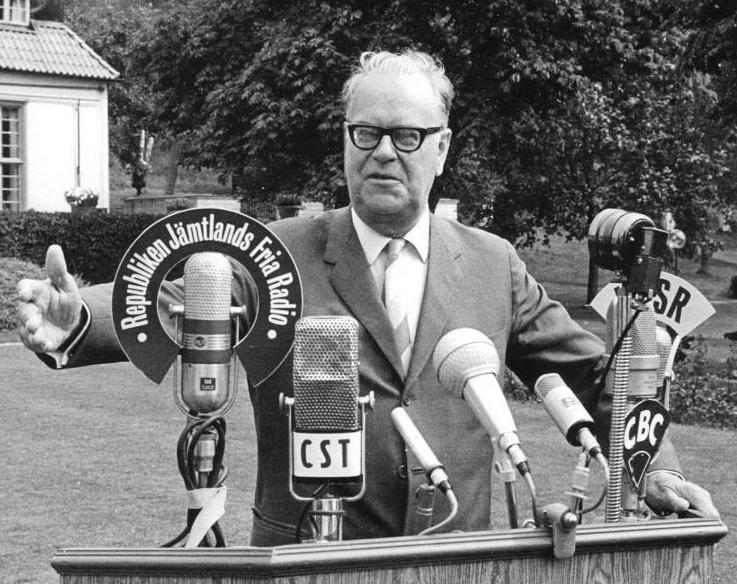
Erlander speaks to the Republic of Jamtland's free radio in 1967.

Erlander was initially somewhat controversial, paritially because he was not considered an obvious successor to Per Albin Hansson. (Note: There is disagreement over whether Hansson would have supported Erlander. There is no written evidence of his opinion, but some verbal evidence exists. Hansson was asked at a summer 1946 dinner in Uppsala about who would succeed him. Hansson said the party would choose, but he thought it could be Erlander. According to Hansson's wife Sigrid, days before he died he said, "Now I know who is going to succeed me. It will be Tage Erlander." She told this to many people on many occasions, including the Erlanders.) When he became prime minister, many Swedes didn't know who he was, and he was often seen as being in Hansson's shadow politically during the early years of his premiership. He was initially both praised and criticized for having been a university graduate. Critics believed he had not risen as far as Hansson, and he had not been a traditional worker. Liberal newspapers were optimistic, as Erlander had more education and administrative experience than Hansson, which was seen as beneficial to the party. His youth also won him both praise and concern. He was seen as a figure whose youth and stronger left-leaning ideals could bring new energy to the party. However, as he was younger than several members in his cabinet, it was feared that he would be unable to maintain party unity.

Despite initial fears about party instability, throughout his premiership, Erlander became increasingly known as a unifying figure within his party, as he came to be viewed as a centrist who would sometimes utilized both left-leaning and right leaning policies, although overall the party moved more towards the left. Erlander's nationwide support during his premiership was at its strongest in the 1960s. While making radio broadcasts, he was criticized for his "unpleasant" voice. His popularity increased as television began to play an important role in Swedish politics, as Erlander's amiable and humorous personality was more apparent. Historian Dick Harrison cites a 1962 appearance on Lennart Hyland's popular talk show Hylands hörna where Erlander told a humorous story about a priest as the beginning of his growing popularity among the Swedish public. Also attributed to his rise in popularity was an increased emphasis on his poverty-ridden childhood and less emphasis was placed on his time at university, improving his image as a "man of the people".

Erlander's debating style was controversial, and was criticized by many, including writer Stig Ahlgren. During debates, Erlander was often known to change between serious and comical tones, and those he debated were often frustrated as they could not keep pace with him.

In 1967, standard public opinion polls began in Sweden. In February, 65 percent of Social Democrats approved of his party leadership, 25 percent were unsure, and 10 percent thought his leadership was poor. In November of that same year, his approval ratings had reached 77 percent, and reached 84 percent in May 1968. After the 1968 general election, his approval within the party was 95 percent. In 1969, 54% of the general population polled showed approval of him as prime minister, while 80% approved of his leadership of the Social Democratic Party.

Erlander garnered a number of nicknames during his tenure as prime minister. He became known as "Sweden's longest Prime Minister" referring to both his physical stature – 192 cm (6 ft 4 in) (Note: Erlander's height has been given as both 6 feet 4 inches and 6 feet 3 inches. 192 centimeters technically falls between the two inches, and other figures of the same height, such as Lyndon B. Johnson, are often cited as 6 feet 3 1/2 inches. This article uses 6 feet 4 inches for consistency with sources.) (Note: Carl Bildt, Prime Minister of Sweden from 1991 to 1994, is also 1.92 meters tall, meaning they are tied for the tallest Swedish prime minister.) – and his record tenure of 23 years (the Swedish word lång meaning both 'long' and 'tall'). Political cartoons often mocked Erlander by exaggerating his height. By the 1960s, he became generally affectionately referred to as "Tage" (as opposed to Erlander, Mr. Erlander, Prime Minister Erlander, etc.) within the Social Democratic Party, similar to how Per Albin Hansson had become known more as "Per Albin".

Erlander coined the phrase "the strong society", describing a society with a growing public sector taking care of the growing demand on many services that an affluent society creates. The public sector, particularly its welfare state institutions, grew considerably during his tenure as prime minister, while nationalizations were rare. In order to maintain employment for his vast electorate and Swedish sovereignty as a non-NATO member, the armed forces was greatly expanded, reaching an impressive level by the 1960s, while nuclear capability was ultimately dropped after outcries, not least from the Social Democratic Women's League.

=== Resignation and succession ===
On 1 October 1969, Erlander resigned as prime minister at 68, with an absolute majority for the Social Democrats in the second chamber since 1968. Erlander was succeeded by 42-year-old Olof Palme, who, although more radical and more controversial, had in many ways been Erlander's student and protégé, and was endorsed by Erlander. Palme was later asked when Erlander first hinted to him that he wanted him as his successor. Palme stated, "It never happened." Prior to the announcement of Palme, President of Finland Urho Kekkonen asked Erlander who his successor would be, and Erlander did not give a concrete answer. Kekkonen then asked if it would be Palme, to which Erlander responded, "Never, he is far too intelligent for a Prime Minister".

== Domestic policies ==
=== Housing policy ===
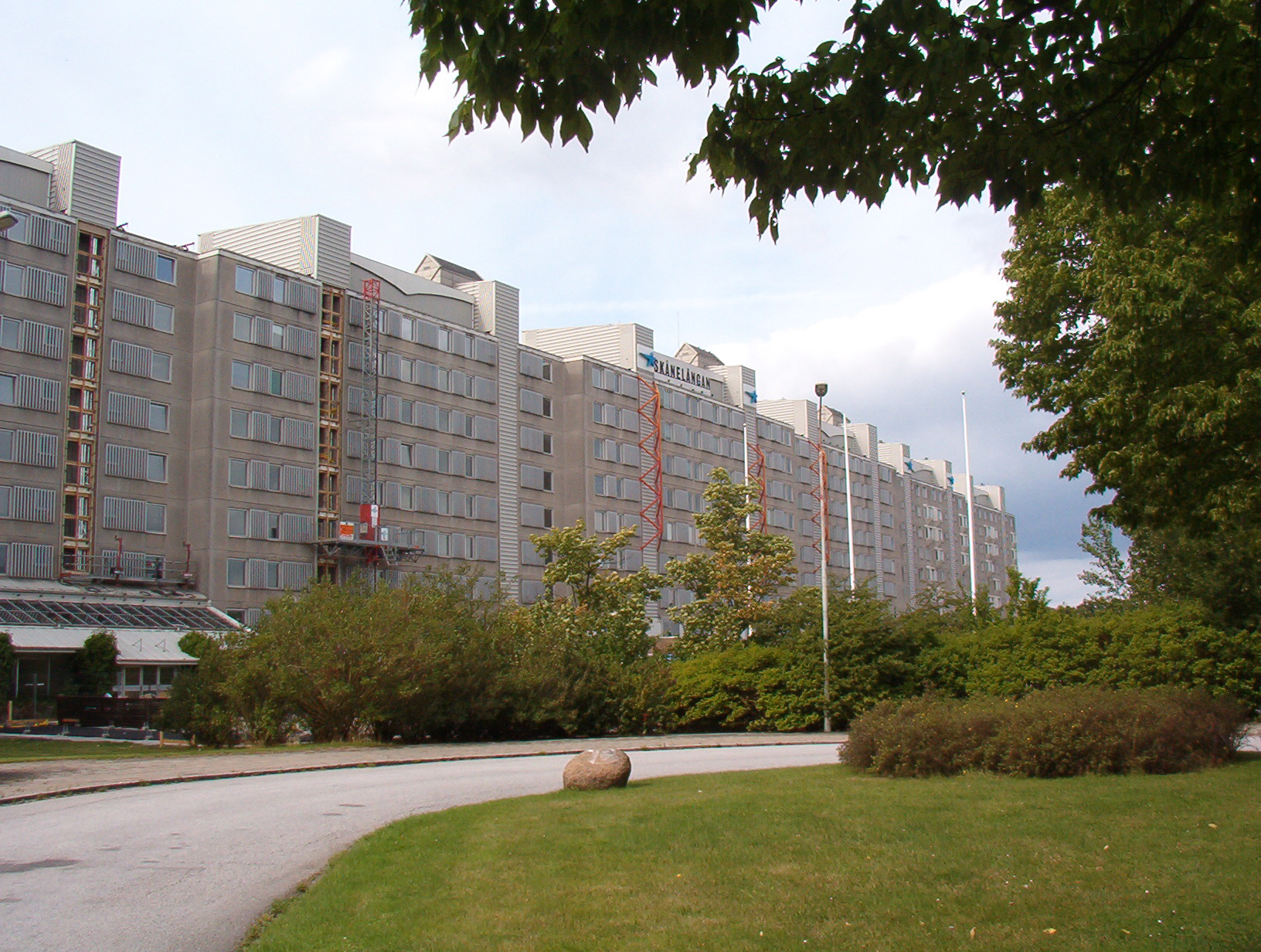
A housing complex in Rosengård created as part of the Million Programme

Following World War II, Sweden increasingly developed a housing shortage in larger cities. In response, at the 1964 Social Democratic Party conference, the party adopted the Million Programme, a plan to build one million homes in the span of ten years. The proposal successfully passed through the Riksdag in 1965. The motto for the program was, "A good home for everyone."

In 1966, during the early period of the project, during a debate he was asked what a young couple should do if they wanted to buy an apartment and start a family in Stockholm. Erlander answered, "stand in the housing queue." It was intended as an honest answer, but was unpopular, as the wait for an apartment in Stockholm was found to be ten years long, and it is said to have been the cause of Social Democratic losses in the municipal elections that year.

Additionally, critics argued that the Million Programme created a form of segregation, with more recent evidence indicating that creating uniformity and separating this housing from more high-quality housing was part of the plan. In 1965, in response to this criticism, Erlander defended the program by arguing that American racial tensions and segregation didn't exist in and couldn't be reproduced in Sweden. Erlander stated, "We Swedes live in an infinitely more fortunate situation. The population of our country is homogeneous, not only in regard to race, but also in many other aspects." Critics also argued that the new housing was somewhat ugly and visually monotonous.

Despite this, the goal of 1,000,000 homes was successfully reached by 1974, with 1,006,000 homes built, which, at the time, solved most of the problem, though not all of it. The Social Democrats were eventually able to recover from the municipal losses.

A number of other housing initiatives were embarked upon under Erlander. In 1947, housing allowances for families with children were introduced, and later for pensioners in 1954. In 1947, a special law was passed “setting up principles governing the construction and operation of homes for the aged.” Over 400 new homes for the aged were constructed between 1947 and 1961, while many more were modernized. In 1956, a law on tenancy security was introduced that provided tenants with (as noted by one study) “the right to stay in their homes.”

=== Economic policy ===
In 1959, Erlander's government proposed raising the previously lowed income taxes, partially to provide funding for recent welfare programs. Conservative parties opposed the proposal, and the Left Party abstained from voting in the Second Chamber, allowing the proposal to go into law.

In 1962, Sweden joined the G10, being one of ten countries that agreed to provide an additional $6 billion each in funding to the International Monetary Fund.

In 1964, Erlander's government proposed a new budget that would begin on July 1 of that year. The total budget would be $4.858 billion (in 1964), an increase from the previous budget by $475 million. The expected deficit was $180 million, and to prevent it from increasing, Erlander's government proposed ending deductions of old-age pension fees from taxable income. About half the budget was expected to be spent on welfare-related benefits and programs.

On average, during Erlander's premiership, Sweden's GNP increased roughly 2.5% a year. It rose 5% in 1963 and 6% in 1964.

=== Health and welfare policy ===
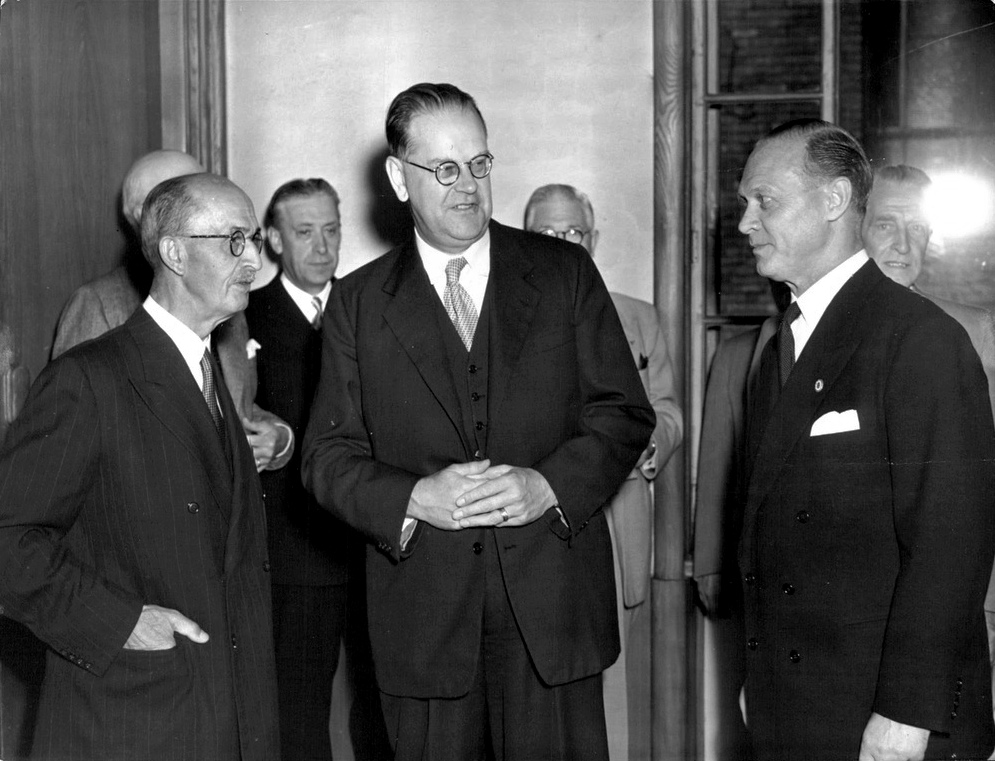
Erlander (center) in 1951 with Lt. Col. Ernst Bredberg (left) and glazier Gerhard Nilsson (right)

In 1948, a universal flat-rate pension was introduced, together with a general child allowance. In 1951, county councils were given responsibility for the care of chronically ill persons, who previously had received support from the poor relief system, and in 1967 became responsible for mental healthcare. In 1955, a national health insurance system was introduced. In 1956, the Social Democrats sponsored a law on "social help" which further extended social services. That same year, the length of time in which unemployment benefit was payable was increased. In 1960, the income test for the children’s pension was removed. A 1962 law eliminated an income test which had previously been required (as noted by one study) "for the approval of a National Disability Pension." Also in 1962, the Building Chamber was amended, implying (as noted by one study) “that public spaces shall be reasonably accessible for people with mobility impairment.”

An Act of 1964 regarding advance payments of maintenance allowances provided (as noted by one study) “considerably improved protection of the children of divorced persons and children of unmarried mothers.” That same year, a special allowance for the care of disabled children was introduced. In 1966, the right to disablement benefit was extended, while in 1967 changes were made to the health insurance scheme including the abolition of the waiting period and a rise in the sickness allowance. In 1967, the first Social Welfare Act for the Mentally Retarded was introduced. This gave, as noted by one study, “people with educational impairment the right to education and daily activities.” In 1968, a new institute for the care of handicapped persons was established, and that same year the Social Assistance Act was amended, with the local social welfare committees now required by law (as noted by one study) “to find out the needs of individuals for care and to ensure that these are met satisfactorily.” Also in 1968, a new scheme of special financial support was introduced to help unemployed persons; particularly those between the ages of 60 and 66. That same year, waiting days for sickness cash benefits were brought to an end while the compensation rate was increased to 80% of net earnings.

=== Labour policy ===
A number of laws concerning vacations, worker's safety and working hours were introduced during the course of Erlander's premiership. The Swedish Workers' Protection Act of 1949 introduced new rights in the workplace such as a 12-week maternity leave period and workers' delegates in all employments (as noted by one study) “statutory powers, protection against victimization, and special access to the Government inspectors." Agricultural workers were also included under the scope of this new law, which also introduced (as noted by one study) “the principle of the prohibition of night work.” Royal notifications were also made in 1949 that aimed to improve health and safety in various industries. In June 1949, an Act was issued respecting (as noted by one study) “rights in the inventions of employees.” A new Merchant Seamen Act was introduced in 1952 with the aim of improving the economic rights and employment conditions of seamen. Under the Occupational Injury Insurance Act of 1954, occupational diseases became compensable to a much larger extent, while the group of individuals entitled to compensation was expanded. In 1957, legislation was passed that provided for a gradual reduction in the statutory workweek.

Travel allowances related to the transfer of unemployed workers were liberalized in 1957, and the following year these allowances were supplemented by family allowances and in 1959 by starting allowances. The latter, as noted by one study, “was a lump-sum payment to enable workers to live until they can draw their first paycheck.” In 1962, amendments were made the Seamen’s Act with the aim of ensuring that alien persons employed in the Swedish Merchant Navy service would have the same fringe benefits as their Swedish counterparts. Amendments were also made to the Labour Welfare Act, in which the special provisions referring to extended nightly rest for women employed in the crafts or in industrial work were abolished. This aimed to ensure that provisions related to nightly rest would apply equally to men and women. In 1964, amendments were made to the Vacation Act with the aim of ensuring that a vacation (as noted by one study) “should not coincide with sick-leave or any other vacation-qualifying absence from work such as _e.g. the Defence Forces' refresher training.” Under the State Officials Act of 1965, public officials were granted bargaining rights. The duration of paid holidays was also increased by law; to 3 weeks in 1951 and later to 4 weeks in 1963.

=== Education policy ===
In 1947, state grants for securing improvements in school conditions were introduced. Vocational education was promoted, with the Swedish parliament in 1955 deciding to vote credits for establishing and expanding trade schools. Also in 1955, a reform was carried out with the aim of increasing significantly state aid to school libraries. Laws were passed in 1955 and 1958 that provided state subsidies to municipally organized vocational schools and folk high schools. Laws were passed in 1964 that led to an expansion of higher education and also set up a special preparatory vocational school. A further general scholarship for pupils aged 16 and above was introduced in 1958. In 1962, compulsory school attendance for children with mobility impairment was introduced. In 1964, a new and extended study allowance system was set up.

In 1950, a new nine-year comprehensive educational system was preliminarily authorized, and a pilot programme was launched. In 1962, an Education Act set out a timetable for when comprehensive education would be generally adopted. The transfer to comprehensive school was eventually completed in the early Seventies. In 1965, it was decided by the government to subsidise adult education organisations that provided immigrants with courses in the Swedish language. In 1967, a reform of adult education was carried out that led to the establishment the following year of a service called Municipal Adult Education. This sought to provide adults aged 20 and over (as noted by one study) “with skills at levels corresponding to compulsory school.” Entrance exams to State secondary schools and to corresponding school types were also ended for pupils who had reached (as noted by one study) “ the prescribed standards in the appropriate class of the elementary school.”

=== Nuclear weapons ===
The question of nuclear weapons as a means to deter a possible attack remained a divisive factor in Swedish society and among Social Democrats and prompted diplomatic agreements with the United States, guaranteeing intervention in the case of an invasion. Erlander was initially in favor of acquiring nuclear weapons as a means of defense, but received criticism for this position. Following a 1954 report by Supreme Commander Nils Swedlund, who advocated for Sweden acquiring nuclear weapons to maintain neutrality, Erlander sought to avoid public debate on the issue so his party could develop a unified position and then collaborate with the opposition. However, the Social Democrats became split on the issue while the Moderates publicly pushed for nuclear weapons. The largest opposition within Erlander's party came from the Social Democrat Women's Organization (SSKF).

The first government meeting on the issue occurred in November 1955, and the Social Democratic Party held a discussion in February 1956. Erlander had his anti-nuclear foreign minister Östen Undén discuss ongoing UN nuclear disarmament talks. Erlander also proposed delaying the decision until 1958, because, according to him, the government lacked sufficient knowledge about the technical prerequisites to have nuclear weapons, and that he did not want to complicate the disarmament talks by producing nuclear weapons at that time. After Undén's presentation, SSKF chair Inga Thorsson declared that her organization publicly opposed nuclear weapons, but the board ultimately followed Erlander's proposed postponement.

During a March 1959 debate in the Riksdag, Erlander implied that he did not want to add to the "limited number of countries" with atomic weapons, pending the results of a nuclear summit. Sweden signed the nuclear non-proliferation treaty in 1968, dropping all pretenses of developing a nuclear weapon. However, some nuclear reactors were kept secret from IAEA until 1994, and small teams of theoretical physicists continued researching nuclear weapons after Erlander's premiership. Some international observers speculated that Erlander and future Swedish leaders maintained interest in a hypothetical nuclear system for defense, but did not take action to develop one. According to Erlander's memoirs, Swedish military chiefs believed in limited nuclear war, inspired by Henry Kissinger's advocation of the policy, as it was a "defense strategy that appeared to be made for a small state's defense".

== Foreign policy ==
=== Cold War neutrality and international alliances ===
Under Erlander, Sweden had to navigate the challenges of the Cold War. Sweden did not officially side with either the United States or the Soviet Union, although Sweden's official position has been described as a "non-alliance", rather than "neutral", and Erlander once stated that Sweden shared an "ideological affinity with the Western democracies." Sweden's firm stance on neutrality was supported by Erlander and his foreign minister Undén, who were seen as the two leading figures of the Social Democratic Party.

Erlander represented Sweden at the funerals of several foreign heads of state, such as those of United States President John F. Kennedy in 1963 and West German Chancellor Konrad Adenauer in 1967.

Negotiations for a Scandinavian defence union began in 1948, with Erlander and Danish Prime Minister Hans Hedtoft being its strongest proponents. The proposal fell apart and was shelved in January 1949 due to Norwegian resistance and the country's acceptance of membership in NATO, with Denmark and Iceland following suit. In Erlander's 1952 United States tour, he stated that Sweden would not join NATO. Erlander was generally considered a pro-Western leader despite this, and wrote that America was doing Europe a great service by allowing itself to increase their arms for defense against the Soviet Union.

In 1961, Erlander and President John F. Kennedy advocated for the West to strengthen the United Nations and its Secretary General, Swedish politician Dag Hammarskjöld. Erlander was a strong supporter of the proposed Nordic economic community Nordek, and held meetings on the subject with Finnish President Urho Kekkonen and Prime Minister Mauno Koivisto in 1969.

=== United States and Vietnam War ===
In 1952, as part of his U.S. tour, Erlander visited United States President Harry S. Truman, which was the first time a Swedish Prime Minister and a U.S. president met. Erlander would later meet Dwight D. Eisenhower, John F. Kennedy, and Lyndon B. Johnson.

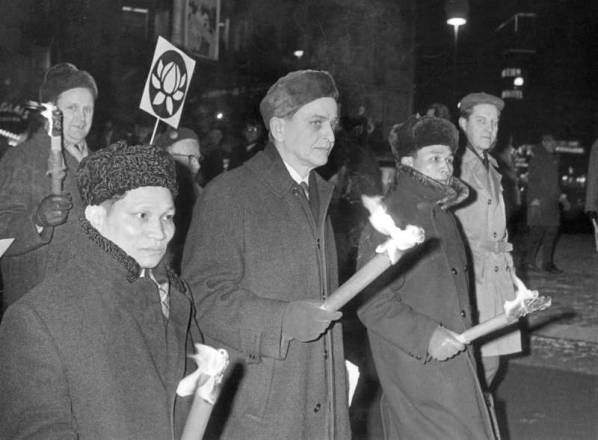
Olof Palme (second from left) marching against the Vietnam War with the North Vietnamese ambassador Nguyễn Thọ Chân (left) in Stockholm, on February 21, 1968. This event was controversial domestically and abroad, and fractured Sweden-U.S. relations.

In 1958, Sweden recognized South Vietnam. They established diplomatic relations in Saigon in 1960, but did not establish an official ambassador there.

In the 1960s, Erlander and the Swedish government became critical of the Vietnam War. Despite Erlander's personal opposition to the war and the uneasy nature of U.S.-Sweden relations at that point, William Womack Heath, the U.S. ambassador to Sweden during the Lyndon B. Johnson administration, found Erlander to be "completely pro-American" from 1967 until early 1968.

On February 21, 1968, Olof Palme participated in a torchlight parade through Stockholm with North Vietnam's ambassador to Moscow, Nguyễn Thọ Chân, to protest the Vietnam War, an event which soured Swedish relations with the United States and stirred controversy worldwide, and led to Heath being recalled for "consultations", with no immediate successor appointed. Moderate leader Yngve Holmberg called for Palme's resignation from the cabinet, but the demand was not met. By March 1968, Sweden had accepted 79 draft-dodgers from the United States, and Erlander, soon followed by opposition party leaders, publicly stated his opposition to the Vietnam War.

=== Soviet Union and Warsaw Pact ===
In 1950, Erlander condemned the aggression of North Korea that began the Korean War, deeming it, "a deed of violence calculated to imperil world peace". Sweden then dispatched a field hospital in South Korea. In June 1952, during the war, the Soviet Union shot down two Swedish military aircraft, an event known as the Catalina affair.

Erlander and Hedlund planned a visit the Soviet Union in 1956 to ease tensions, the first time a Swedish prime minister visited the country. However, Erlander was willing to cancel the trip should the Soviet government have refused to accept the information the Swedish government had collected on Raoul Wallenberg, a businessman and humanitarian who had served as Sweden's special envoy in Budapest. Wallenberg disappeared during the Siege of Budapest after his arrest by Soviet forces in 1945. Since 1952, the Swedish government had demanded Wallenberg's return, but the Soviet Union insisted it was unfamiliar with him. During the visit, which occurred as expected, Erlander questioned Soviet Premier Nikita Khrushchev about Wallenberg's status, and presented Khrushchev with a large file of evidence that showed the Soviet Union's connection to Wallenberg's disappearance. Khrushchev examined it and stated that Swedish-Soviet relations would be positive if the Wallenberg affair was dropped. Soviet documents stated that Wallenberg died in a cell in 1947 of a heart attack, but Erlander, the Swedish government, and international observers were skeptical. Wallenberg biographer Ingrid Carlberg noted that Soviet documents declassified after the fall of the Soviet Union about Wallenberg existed, which Khrushchev had denied, and that on Wallenberg's official Soviet prison card the crime he was arrested for was unspecified.

In 1959, Khrushchev planned to visit Scandinavia and Finland, but the Swedish press and opposition reacted negatively to the idea, causing Khrushchev to "postpone" it. Erlander and Undén expressed disappointment in Khrushchev's decision, to which he responded during a speech in Moscow that the decision was because of the Swedish government taking no steps to counter the negative press. Erlander stated that the government could not polemicize against these opinions, as he felt that it would give them undue importance. The government then avoided appointing the anti-Khrushchev leader of the Conservatives, Jarl Hjalmarson, to Sweden's UN delegation. While travelling for his United States visit, Khrushchev sent Erlander a message of "friendship" to ensure the postponed visit was still possible.

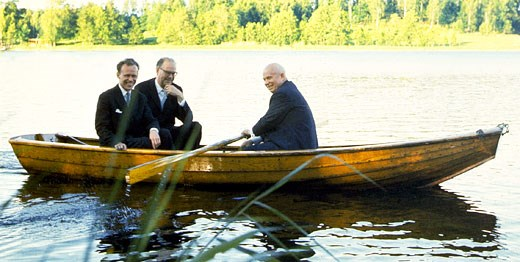
Erlander (center) in the Harpsundseka rowboat on the lake at Harpsund in 1964 with Soviet leader Nikita Khrushchev (right) and his interpreter (left)

In 1963, after the arrest of Stig Wennerström, Erlander stated that the case had seriously disturbed relations between Sweden and the Soviet Union. Nikita Khrushchev had planned a goodwill tour of Scandinavia in 1964, which was to begin 10 days after Wennerström had been given a life sentence. Erlander declined to state how the sentencing might affect Khrushchev's visit.

During that 1964 visit, while receiving Khrushchev at Harpsund, Erlander took Khrushchev and his interpreter in an eka rowing boat called the Harpsundseka across the 300-yard lake nearby. It has since become tradition for Swedish prime ministers and foreign heads of state to row across the lake in the Harpsundseka when they visit Harpsund. In that same visit, Erlander was once again unable to get information out of Khrushchev relating to Raoul Wallenberg. Khrushchev continued denying that Wallenberg was in the Soviet Union, and Erlander and the government expressed "deep disappointment" over the lack of development in the case. There were anti-Khrushchev protests in Sweden from Soviet exiles upon his visit, and the Swedish press criticized him as a liar relating to his discussions over Wallenberg and the stringent security (3000 police officers upon his arrival) around him. Both Khrushchev and Erlander ultimately stated they were pleased with the visit, and Khrushchev left for Norway on June 27 as part of his Scandinavian goodwill tour. Khrushchev did not mention the Wallenberg controversy or the negative press he received in his farewell address. After visiting the Soviet Union in 1965, Erlander stated that the case had to be closed.

In 1968, tensions rose between Czechoslovakia and the Soviet Union due to the former's implementation of political reforms. The Swedish public expected their government to support Czechoslovakia given its opposition to the Vietnam War, but the government wished to maintain neutrality. In July, Soviet politician Alexei Kosygin visited Stockholm, which caused the Liberal leader Sven Wedén to give a speech rebuking Erlander's perceived neglect of Czechoslovak self-determination. In response, Erlander and Foreign Minister Torsten Nilsson cited as a reason for their caution a secret report by Agda Rössel, the ambassador in Belgrade, who stated that Czechoslovak leaders desired Western silence. Although the government's response was not as strong as it had been to the Vietnam War, when the Warsaw Pact invasion of Czechoslovakia began, Erlander, the Social Democrats, and all opposition parties condemned it. The Social Democrats' opposition to the invasion likely helped them electorally in 1968.

=== South Africa and Apartheid ===
In the 1960s, after Erlander finished giving a speech to students at Lund University, South African Lund student and anti-apartheid activist Billy Modise personally asked Erlander to impose sanctions on South Africa in response to apartheid. Erlander stated that he did not have the power to do so, but advised Modise to publicly lobby for the policy. Olof Palme was also an advocate for sanctions against South Africa, and became more outspoken on his opposition to aparthied after he joined Erlander's cabinet in 1963.

The Swedish South Africa Committee was created in 1961. In 1963, the National Council of Swedish Youth launched a boycott against South African goods. Erlander and Palme were among the sponsors of the committee. Swedish donations to the International Defence and Aid Fund for Southern Africa (IDAF) increased around 140,000 SEK. The number continued to go up when, in 1964, Sweden became the first industrialized Western country to donate public funds to the IDAF, the equivalent of $100,000. In the end, Sweden was the largest donar by far.

=== Israel ===
In 1947, Sweden voted in favor of the United Nations Partition Plan for Palestine. In 1948, Sweden recognized Israel. Sweden established an embassy in Israel in 1951.

In 1962, Erlander became the first Swedish prime minister to visit Israel. During his visit, Erlander was famously photographed swimming in the Dead Sea. He spoke to Prime Minister David Ben-Gurion. According to Erlander, no specific policies were discussed, although he stated he hoped the visit would strengthen Israeli-Swedish relations. Erlander stated that he was "fascinated" by the country, and he invited Premier Ben-Gurion to visit Sweden. Ben-Guiron visited Sweden later that year.

== Ideology and political positions ==
Despite Erlander being familiar with the writings of Karl Marx and identifying as a socialist, he did not subscribe to full Marxism and did not support nationalization, instead believing in a strong public sector under well-regulated capitalism with social welfare programs. Based on his university studies, Erlander believed that Keynesian economics and Stockholm School economics were compatible with social democracy, and could be useful in ending economic slumps. Unlike many other left-leaning intellectuals, Erlander did not sympathize with the Soviet Union, although he did attempt to maintain positive Swedish-Soviet relations.

On the role of politicians, Erlander reportedly stated that, "A politician's job is to build the dance floor, so that everyone can dance as they please."

Erlander acknowledged the need for women to play a larger role in politics and hold cabinet positions. However, he had disputes or grievances with all the women who actually did serve in his cabinet.

Erlander had a good relationship with Moderate Party leader Jarl Hjalmarson, although he viewed Hjalmarson as a "political lightweight." Erlander hoped in 1968 that later Moderate leader Yngve Holmberg would remain in office due to the disorganization of the opposition parties and Holmberg's perceived "clunkiness". Erlander admired the writings of Adlai Stevenson II, because Stevenson "expressed his views more deftly than he could himself".

== Personal life ==
=== Family and living situation ===
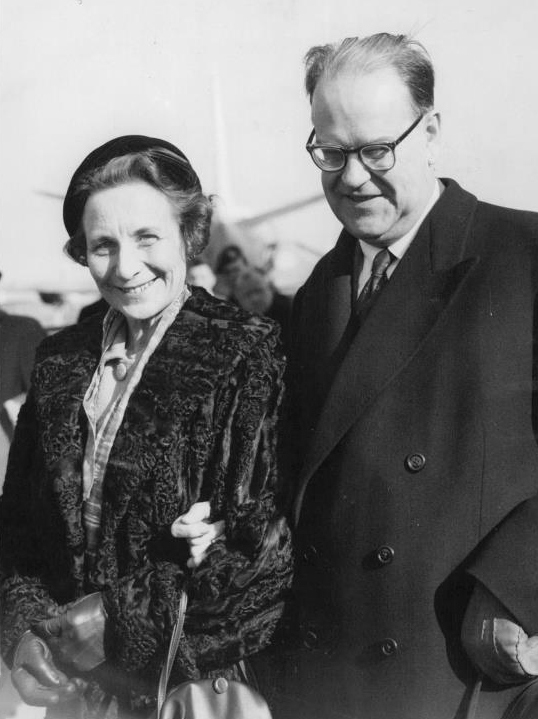
Aina and Tage Erlander in 1964

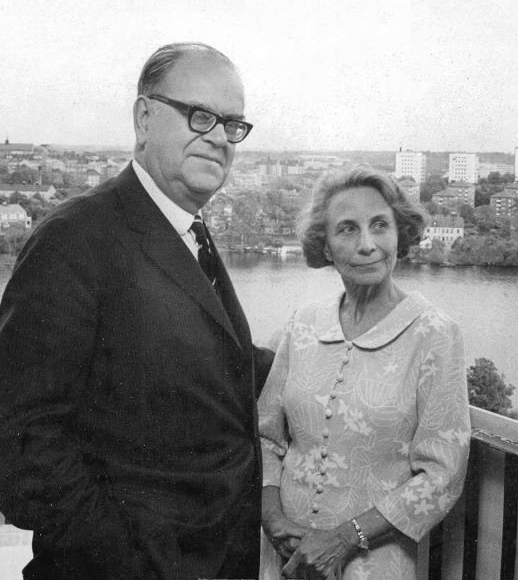
Aina and Tage Erlander in 1966

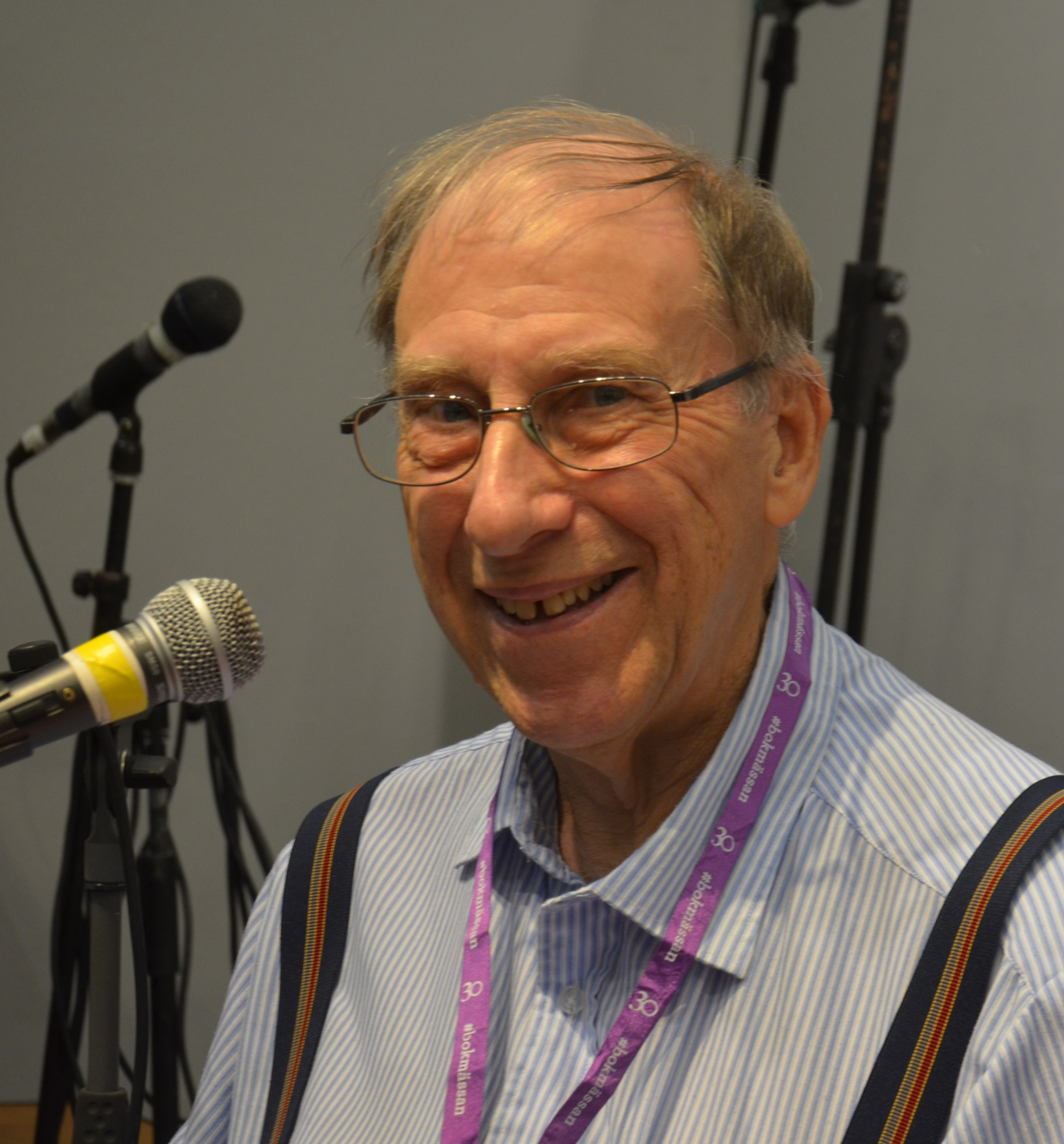
Tage and Aina's son Sven Erlander

He met his future wife Aina Andersson while they were both students at Lund University. They married in 1930. Their marriage has been described as "deeply harmonious" and "full of mutual trust", and Erlander's family life as "remarkably happy". Their son Sven was a mathematician who published much of the content of his father's diaries from 2001 on. Erlander's mother, Alma, died in 1961, at age 92, during her son's premiership.

Through one Erlander's Finnish ancestors, Simon Larsson (née Kauttoinen) (c. 1605–1696), he is a distant relative of Stefan Löfven, the Social Democratic Prime Minister of Sweden from 2014 to 2021.

Carl August Wicander gave Harpsund to the Swedish government as a country retreat for prime ministers in 1953. Erlander starting using it as a vacation home that year, and all prime ministers since have continued this practice. Erlander and his wife often spent Christmases, Easters, weekends, and summers at vacationing at Harpsund. For most of his career, the Erlander family lived in an apartment in Bromma, Stockholm, until the summer of 1964, when they moved to an apartment in a high-rise complex in Stockholm's Gamla stan (Old Town) district. Earlier in his career, Erlander traveled via subway to and from work rather than use a car, although eventually he and Aina bought one. After getting the car, Aina would usually drive him to work, as he did not have a driver's license, dropping him off and then driving to the school where she worked. When Aina was unable to take him, neighbors in Bromma usually offered him rides. Erlander did not have an official car to travel in, and visiting foreign heads of state were often surprised to see that he usually arrived at events alone.

=== Personality, interests, and habits ===
Erlander was known to be a dedicated diarist, often writing daily entries, with his diaries serving as key sources for his memoirs. Erlander wrote on a variety of subjects, and initially wrote to help him remember things related to his work, such as occurrences, arguments, and decisions, going into greater detail on matters he thought were controversial. He also wrote about matters including his family, his health at the time, plays he saw and books he read, and his impressions of other people. Erlander would later frequently note that his diaries contained many exaggerations.

I have never met anyone else who was so completely unspoiled by power. It has easily happened that power corrupts, you try to gain advantages, but Tage taught me that you should instead be humble and grateful that you are given the power to do things.

— Ingvar Carlsson, 2023

Erlander was often described as a "fatherly" or "avuncular". Ingvar Carlsson stated that to him, Erlander became like a second father or a guide. Biographers Harrison and Ruin note that although Erlander was in power longer than any other Swedish leader, he didn't seek power for himself, which Carlsson affirmed.

Erlander was an avid lover of literature and theatre, which often served as a source of recreation. Erlander's favorite novel was John Steinbeck's Cannery Row. Many contemporary Swedish writers were often surprised to learn that their prime minister had read their work.

During his premiership, Erlander often visited his former college Lund University, meeting the Värmland Student Association. At one of these meetings, Student Association members Olof Ruin and Lars Bergquist proposed that Erlander should give annual speeches to Lund students, to which Erlander agreed. In total, he gave fourteen of these student addresses.

== Later life and death ==
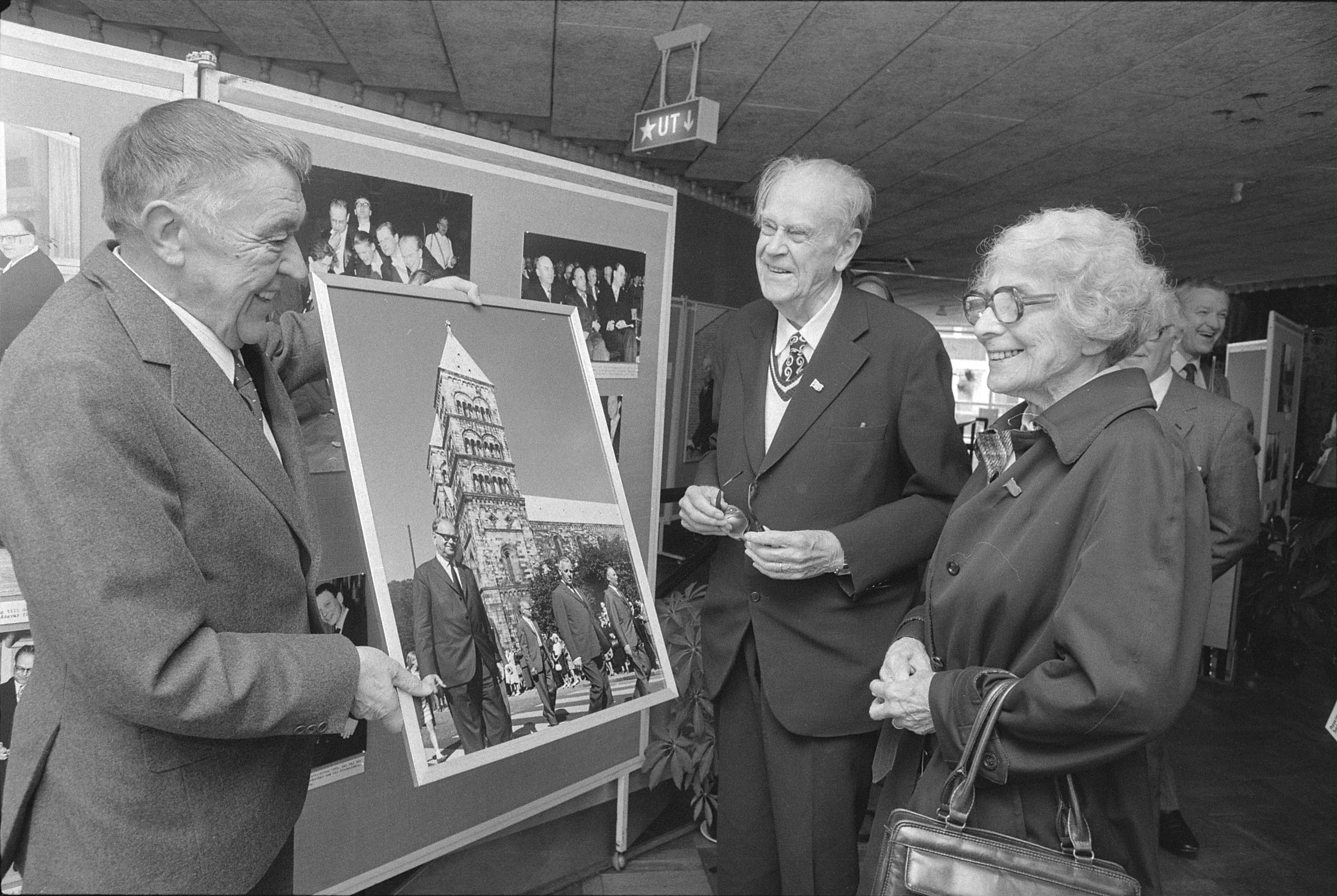
Photographer Kurt Hagblom showing Tage and Aina Erlander his exhibit "Sweden's Longest Prime Minister" in 1984.

After his resignation, Erlander and his wife lived in a house constructed at Bommersvik by the Social Democrats to honor him, and was owned by the Swedish Social Democratic Youth League.

Erlander remained in the Riksdag for several years after it became unicameral. Following the 1970 general election, he once again changed constituencies, now representing Gothenburg, which followed 22 years as a Stockholm representative. He resigned from the Riksdag in 1973, after holding seats there for over forty years.

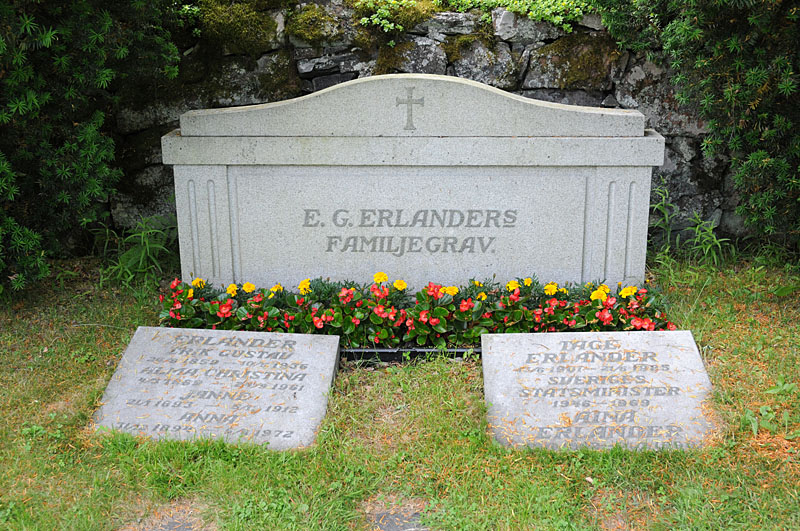
The Erlander family graves in 2011, including Tage and Aina Erlander's headstone (right)

After leaving leadership roles, Erlander began sorting through his personal papers, and chose to use them to help write his political memoirs. He wrote an article for Svenska Dagbladet in 1972 explaining his motives for doing so. The memoirs were published in six volumes from 1972 to 1982. In the 1980s, Erlander allowed writer Olof Ruin unlimited access to his diaries, which would serve as a source for Ruin's biography of Erlander.

Erlander died on 21 June 1985 in Stockholm at the age of 84 from pneumonia and heart failure. Erlander's coffin was covered with a socialist flag and blue and yellow flowers (the colors of the Swedish flag), and was carried through Stockholm. An estimated 45,000 Swedes lined the streets to pay respects to him. A large, secular ceremony was held in Stockholm, wherein Olof Palme delivered Erlander's eulogy. At the end of the service, the audience sang the socialist hymn "The Internationale". After the Stockholm ceremony, his funeral crossed the country and returned to his home town of Ransäter, Värmland, in a triumphant procession for the final rest. His wife, who died in 1990, is buried beside him.

== Legacy ==
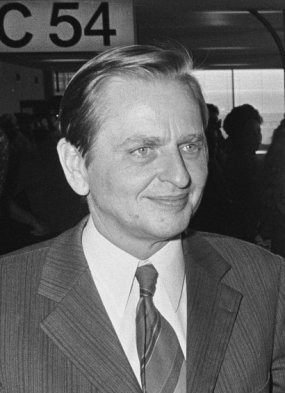
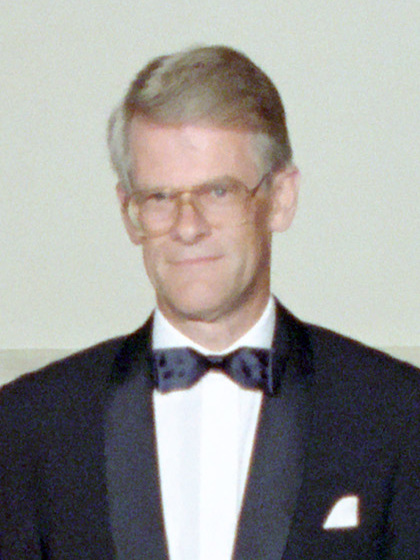
Erlander's protégées Olof Palme (left) and Ingvar Carlsson (right) both became prime ministers of Sweden

Erlander served as prime minister for 23 years, making him the longest-serving one in Swedish history. His uninterrupted tenure as head of the government is also the longest ever in any modern Western democracy. Two of Erlander's closest advisors, Olof Palme and Ingvar Carlsson, also became prime ministers of Sweden, and together their tenures equal more than 40 years.

Upon his death, The Washington Post described Erlander as "one of the most popular political leaders". Erlander has been dubbed a "political giant" who transformed Sweden's political climate and brought the nation together. He has been compared to other notable Swedish "political giants" such as Palme and Dag Hammarskjöld. Biographer Dick Harrison and journalist Per Olov Enquist have described Erlander as a "father of the country" (Swedish: landsfader). Ruin notes that as Sweden encountered difficulties in the 1970s, nostalgia sometimes influenced positive views of Erlander, and that his time as leader was looked upon by some as a "golden age" of Swedish history. During his premiership, despite disagreements between parties, particularly the Liberals and Moderates supporting lower taxes, Sweden's major political parties began to increasingly agree on the goal of developing Sweden as a welfare state.

Some conservative and liberal analysts have argued that during Erlander's premiership an air of Sweden becoming a de facto one-party state developed. Critics of Olof Palme have also criticized Erlander for his role in Palme's ascension to the premiership. In general, following Sweden's economic crises in the 1970s, the Swedish Model, and to some extent Erlander's premiership, was scrutinized more.

Left Party leader Nooshi Dadgostar praised Erlander in 2022, citing him as an inspiration who passed reforms laying the foundation of Sweden's welfare state.

The building that served as Erlander's childhood home and schoolhouse in Ransäter is now a museum named Erlandergården centered around him and his life.

The Tage Erlander Prize, given by the Royal Swedish Academy of Sciences, is a prize for research in natural sciences, technology, and mathematics which is named after Erlander.

== Awards ==
Erlander was a nominee for the 1971 Nobel Peace Prize, although he didn't win.

Erlander was awarded the Illis quorum in 1984.

== In popular culture ==
In the 2013 comedy film The Hundred-Year Old Man Who Climbed Out of the Window and Disappeared, Erlander was portrayed by Swedish actor Johan Rheborg.

In the 2021 series En Kunglig Affär, which depicted the Haijby scandal, Erlander was portrayed by Swedish actor Emil Almén.

In the 2022 Netflix series Clark, which depicted the life of Swedish criminal Clark Olofsson, Erlander was portrayed by Swedish actor Claes Malmberg.

== Works ==
- Erlander, Tage (1959). Levande stad (in Swedish). Stockholm: Raben & Sjögren.
- Erlander, Tage (1961). Arvet från Hammarskjöld (in Swedish). Stockholm: Gummessons Bokförlag.
- Erlander, Tage (1972). Tage Erlander 1901–1939 (in Swedish). Stockholm: Tidens förlag. ISBN 91-550-1543-3.
- Erlander, Tage (1973). Tage Erlander 1940–1949 (in Swedish). Stockholm: Tidens förlag. ISBN 91-550-1640-5.
- Erlander, Tage (1974). Tage Erlander 1949–1954 (in Swedish). Stockholm: Tidens förlag. ISBN 91-550-1702-9.
- Erlander, Tage (1976). Tage Erlander 1955–1960 (in Swedish). Stockholm: Tidens förlag. ISBN 91-550-2043-7.
- Erlander, Tage (1982). Tage Erlander 1960-talet (in Swedish). Stockholm: Tidens förlag. ISBN 91-550-2647-8.
- Erlander, Tage (1979). Tage Erlander Sjuttiotal (in Swedish). Stockholm: Tidens förlag. ISBN 91-550-2375-4.
- Erlander, Tage; Erlander, Sven (2001). Dagböcker 1945–1949 (in Swedish). Gidlunds förlag. ISBN 91-7844-335-0.
- Erlander, Tage; Erlander, Sven (2001). Dagböcker 1950–1951 (in Swedish). Gidlunds förlag. ISBN 91-7844-336-9.
- Erlander, Tage; Erlander, Sven (2002). Dagböcker 1952 (in Swedish). Gidlunds förlag. ISBN 91-7844-357-1.
- Erlander, Tage; Erlander, Sven (2003). Dagböcker 1953 (in Swedish). Gidlunds förlag. ISBN 91-7844-362-8.
- Erlander, Tage; Erlander, Sven (2004). Dagböcker 1954 (in Swedish). Gidlunds förlag. ISBN 91-7844-368-7.
- Erlander, Tage; Erlander, Sven (2005). Dagböcker 1955 (in Swedish). Gidlunds förlag. ISBN 91-7844-372-5.
- Erlander, Tage; Erlander, Sven (2006). Dagböcker 1956 (in Swedish). Gidlunds förlag. ISBN 91-7844-375-X.
- Erlander, Tage; Erlander, Sven (2007). Dagböcker 1957 (in Swedish). Gidlunds förlag. ISBN 978-91-7844-384-0.
- Erlander, Tage; Erlander, Sven (2008). Dagböcker 1958 (in Swedish). Gidlunds förlag. ISBN 978-91-7844-390-1.
- Erlander, Tage; Erlander, Sven (2009). Dagböcker 1959 (in Swedish). Gidlunds förlag. ISBN 978-91-7844-775-6.
- Erlander, Tage; Erlander, Sven (2010). Dagböcker 1960 (in Swedish). Gidlunds förlag. ISBN 978-91-7844-804-3.
- Erlander, Tage; Erlander, Sven (2011). Dagböcker 1961–1962 (in Swedish). Gidlunds förlag. ISBN 978-91-7844-825-8.
- Erlander, Tage; Erlander, Sven (2012). Dagböcker 1963–1964 (in Swedish). Gidlunds förlag. ISBN 978-91-7844-851-7.
- Erlander, Tage; Erlander, Sven (2013). Dagböcker 1965 (in Swedish). Gudlunds förlag. ISBN 978-91-7844-880-7.
- Erlander, Tage; Erlander, Sven (2014). Dagböcker 1966–1967 (in Swedish). Gidlunds förlag. ISBN 978-91-7844-907-1.
- Erlander, Tage; Erlander, Sven (2015). Dagböcker 1968 (in Swedish). Gudlunds förlag. ISBN 978-91-7844-934-7.
- Erlander, Tage; Erlander, Sven (2016). Dagböcker 1969 (in Swedish). Gudlunds förlag. ISBN 978-91-7844-957-6.

== Gallery ==
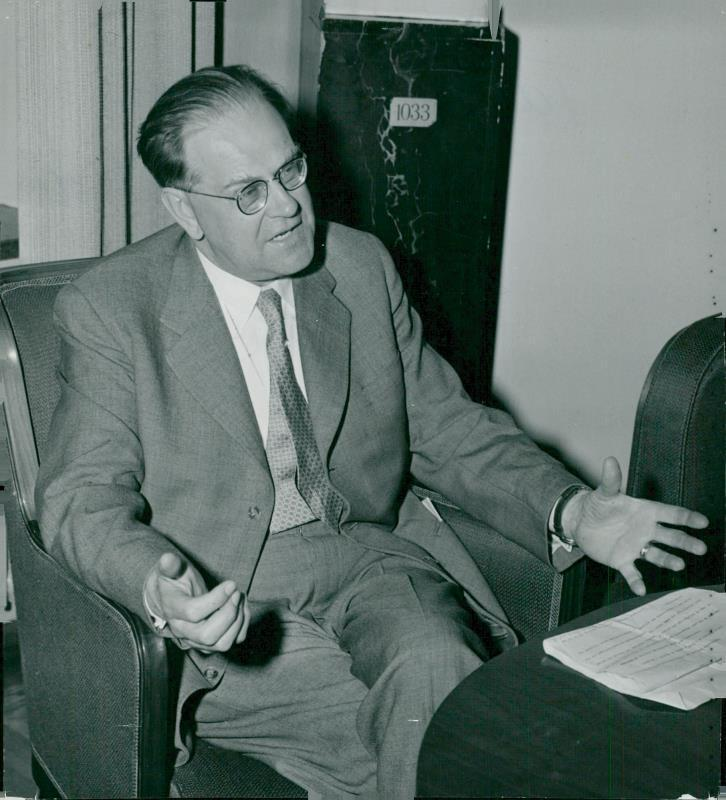
Erlander in 1952

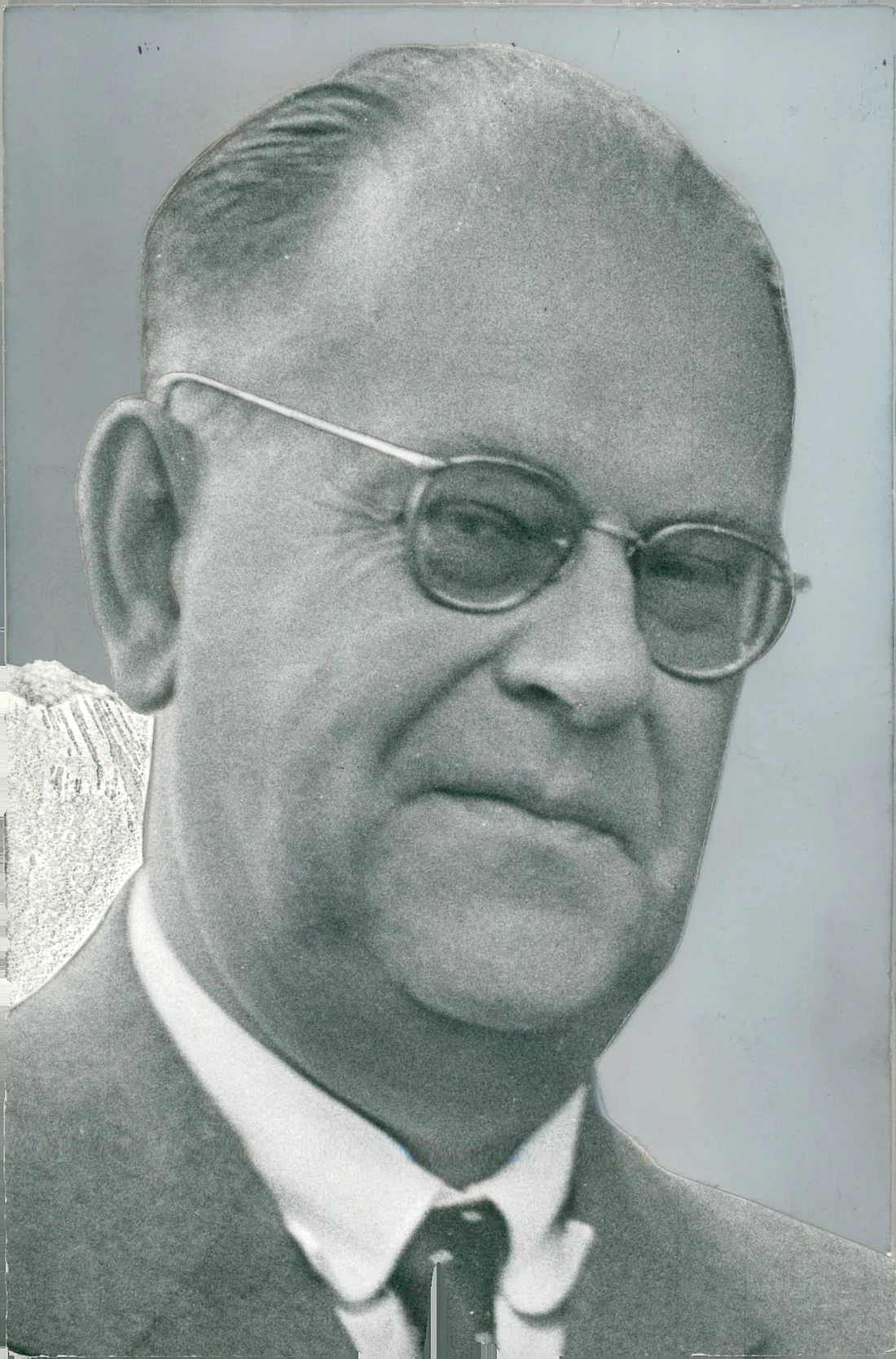
Erlander in 1956

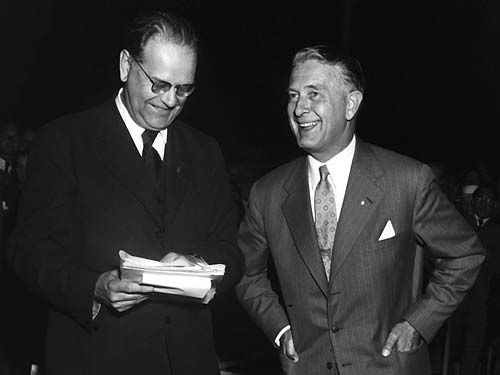
Erlander (left) in 1954 with People's Party leader Bertil Ohlin (right)

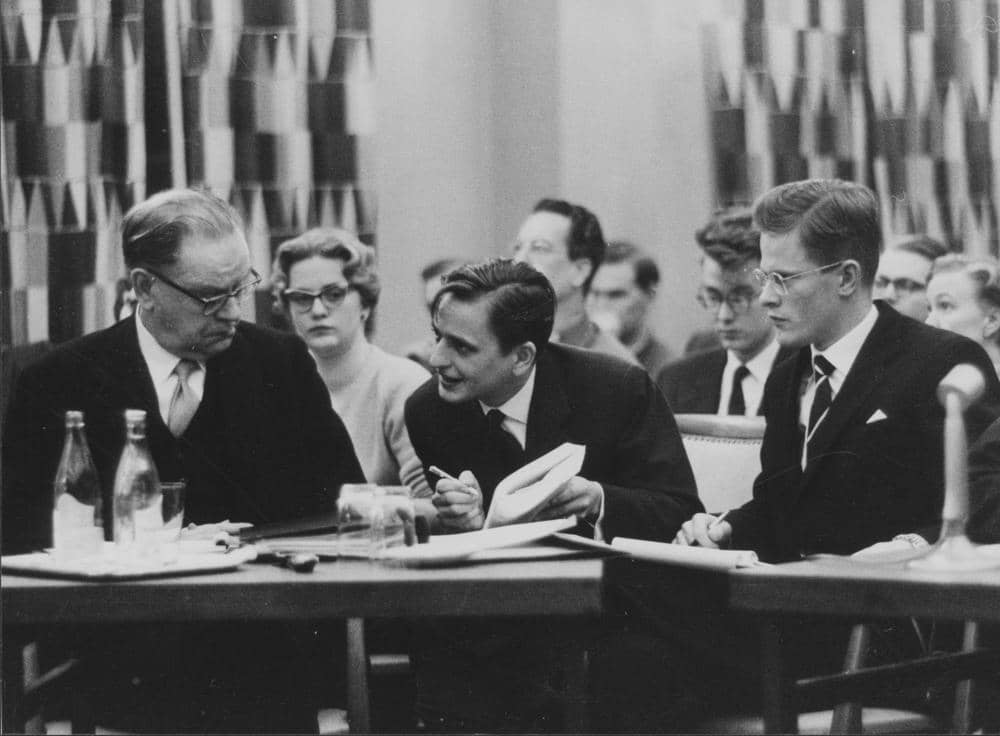
Erlander (left) in 1959 with two of "the boys", Olof Palme (center) and Ingvar Carlsson (right)

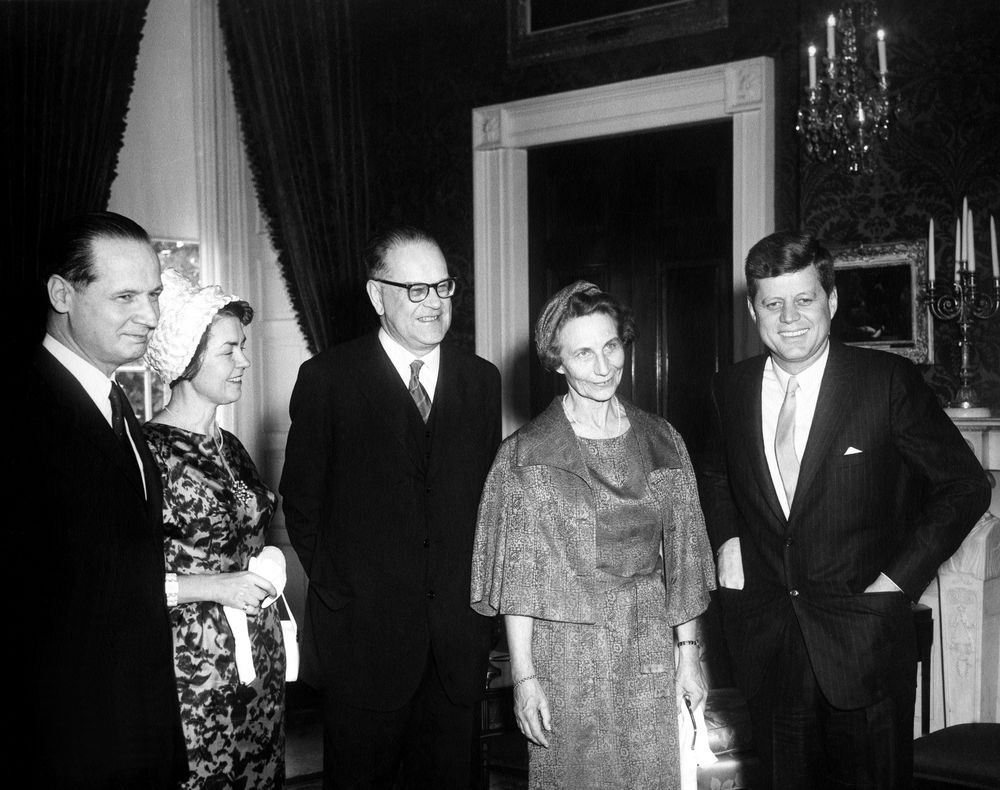
Erlander (third from left) and his wife Aina (second from right) with Gunnar Jarring (left), Jarring's wife Agnes Charlier (second from left), and President John F. Kennedy (right) in 1961

Erlander (right, standing) answering journalists' questions in 1964 with Olof Palme (left, seated)

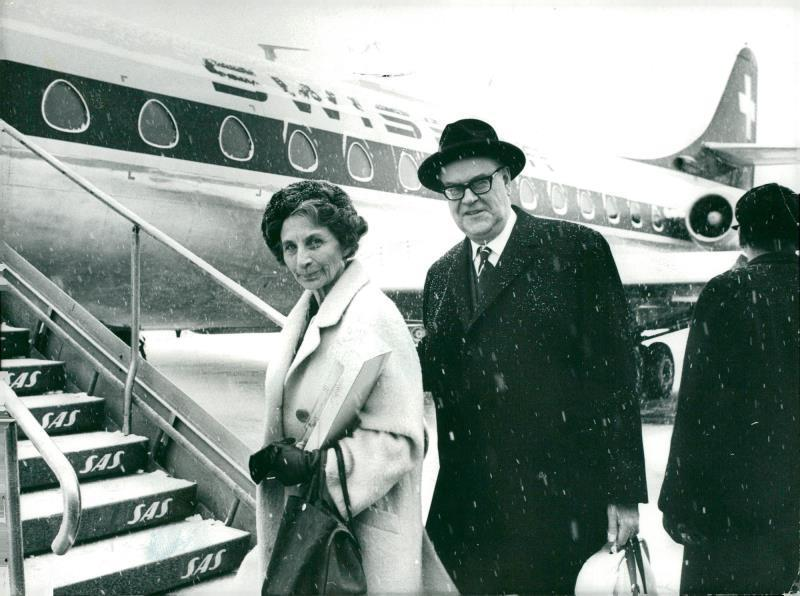
Erlander (right) in 1966 with his wife Aina during a state visit to Cairo

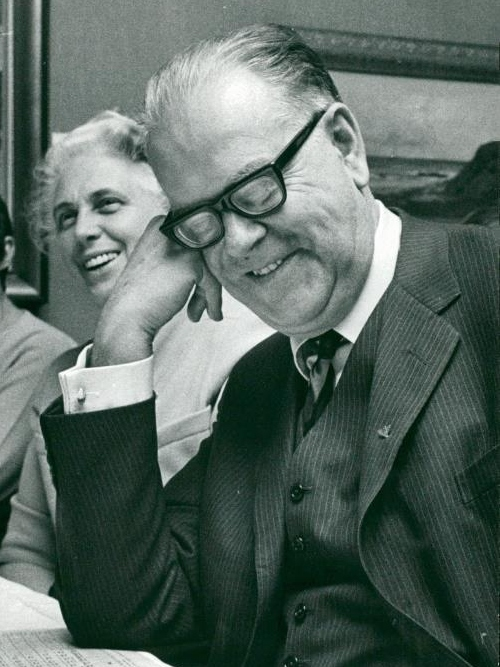
Erlander during the 1966 municipal elections

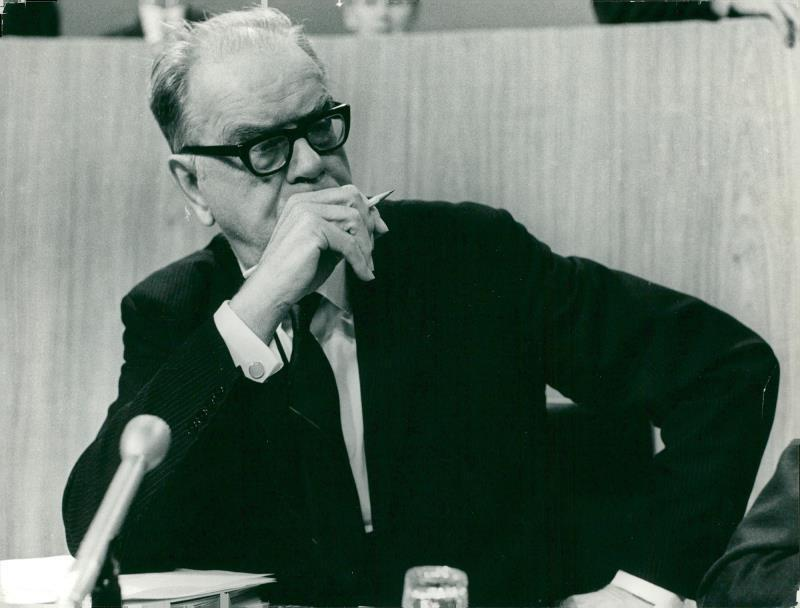
Erlander in 1968

== Notes ==
Political offices
Preceded by Axel Rubbestad	Minister without Portfolio; 1944–1945	Succeeded by Eije Mossberg
Preceded by Georg Andrén	Minister of Education and Ecclesiastical Affairs; 1945–1946	Succeeded by Josef Weijne
Preceded by Per Albin Hansson	Leader of the Swedish Social Democratic Party; 1946–1969	Succeeded by Olof Palme
Preceded by Per Albin Hansson	Prime Minister of Sweden; 1946–1969	Succeeded by Olof Palme
