= Minister of the Interior (Sweden) =

- Inrikesminister
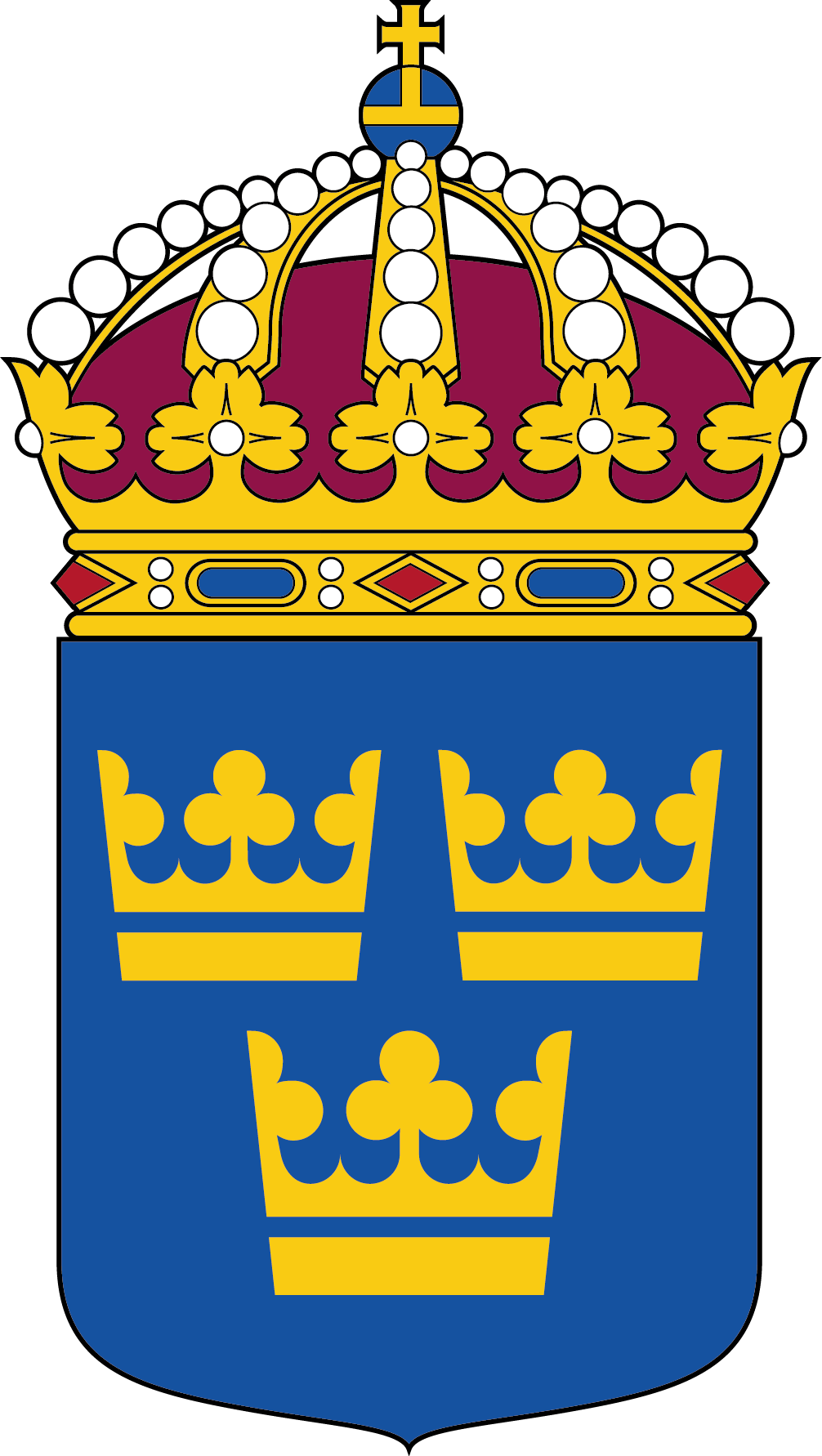
- Ministry of the Interior (1947–74, 1996–98); Ministry of Justice (2014–2022)
- Member of: The Government
- Appointer: The Prime Minister
- Term length: Serves at the pleasure of the Prime Minister
- Inaugural holder: Eije Mossberg
- Formation: 1947
- Final holder: Morgan Johansson
- Abolished: 2022

The Minister of the Interior (Note: Minister of the Interior or Minister for Home Affairs.) (Swedish: Inrikesminister) was a cabinet minister within the Swedish government and appointed by the Prime Minister of Sweden. From 1947 to 1974 and from 1996 to 1998, the minister headed the Ministry of the Interior.

It was reintroduced as a minister without portfolio post under name of Minister for Home Affairs in 2014. Its tasks includes issues regarding the Swedish Police Authority and combating terrorism.

== List of officeholders ==
=== Ministers of the Interior (1947–1973) ===
Portrait	Minister of the Interior (Born-Died)	Term			Political Party	Coalition	Cabinet
Portrait	Minister of the Interior (Born-Died)	Took office	Left office	Duration	Political Party	Coalition	Cabinet
Eije Mossberg	Eije Mossberg (1908–1997)	1 July 1947	1 October 1951	4 years, 92 days	Social Democrats	S	Erlander I
Gunnar Hedlund	Gunnar Hedlund (1900–1989)	1 October 1951	31 October 1957	6 years, 30 days	Centre	S–C	Erlander II
Rune B. Johansson	Rune B. Johansson (1915–1982)	31 October 1957	25 January 1969	11 years, 86 days	Social Democrats	S	Erlander III
Eric Holmqvist	Eric Holmqvist (1917–2009)	25 January 1969	3 November 1973	4 years, 282 days	Social Democrats	S	Erlander III; Palme I
Ingemund Bengtsson	Ingemund Bengtsson (1919–2000)	3 November 1973	31 December 1973	58 days	Social Democrats	S	Palme I
Position abolished between 1973 and 1996
=== Ministers of the Interior (1996–1998) ===
Jörgen Andersson	Jörgen Andersson (born 1946)	1 July 1996	6 October 1998	2 years, 97 days	Social Democrats	S	Persson
Lars Engqvist	Lars Engqvist (born 1945)	6 October 1998	16 November 1998	41 days	Social Democrats	S	Persson
Lars-Erik Lövdén	Lars-Erik Lövdén (born 1950)	16 November 1998	31 December 1998	45 days	Social Democrats	S	Persson
Position abolished between 1998 and 2014
=== Ministers for Home Affairs (2014–2022) ===
Anders Ygeman	Anders Ygeman (born 1970)	3 October 2014	27 July 2017	2 years, 297 days	Social Democrats	S–MP	Löfven I
Morgan Johansson	Morgan Johansson (born 1970)	27 July 2017	21 January 2019	1 year, 178 days	Social Democrats	S–MP	Löfven I
Mikael Damberg	Mikael Damberg (born 1970)	21 January 2019	30 November 2021	2 years, 313 days	Social Democrats	S–MP	Löfven II; Löfven III
Morgan Johansson	Morgan Johansson (born 1970)	30 November 2021	18 October 2022	322 days	Social Democrats	S	Andersson
Position not in use 2022–present
