= Aina Erlander =

Swedish lecturer

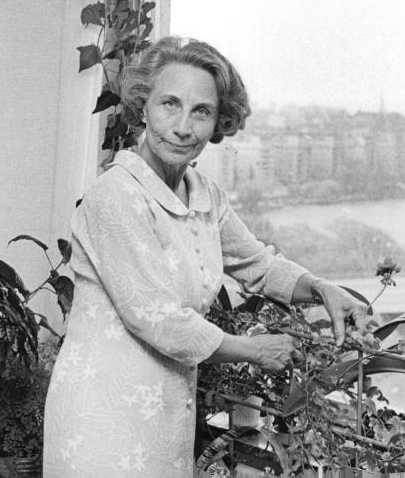
- Erlander in 1966

Spouse of the Prime Minister of Sweden
- In role 11 October 1946 – 14 October 1969
- Prime Minister: Tage Erlander
- Preceded by: Elisabeth Hansson
- Succeeded by: Lisbeth Palme

Personal details
- Born: Aina Andersson; 28 September 1902 Lund, Sweden
- Died: 24 February 1990 (aged 87) Stockholm, Sweden
- Party: Social Democrats
- Spouse: Tage Erlander (m. 1930; died 1985)
- Children: Sven Erlander; Bo Erlander

Aina Erlander (née Andersson; 28 September 1902 – 24 February 1990) was a Swedish lecturer and the wife of Swedish Prime Minister Tage Erlander from 1930 until his death in June 1985.

== Biography ==
Aina Erlander's father was a mill and factory owner active in right wing politics. Erlander attended a girls school and gymnasium, and then continued her studies in Lund. In 1923, she met Tage Erlander, a fellow student in Lund. They worked together in the chemistry department. They married in 1930 and had two sons. Aina worked as a teacher at Södra flickläroverket in Stockholm when Tage Erlander became Prime Minister of Sweden in October 1946.

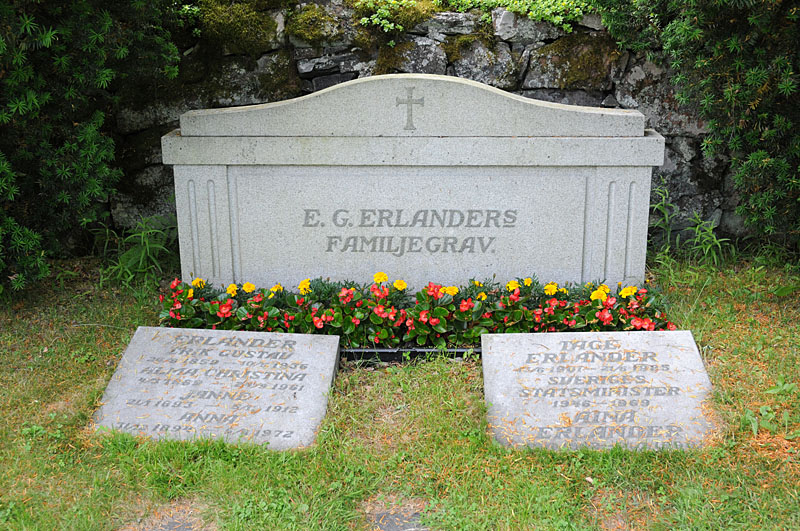
The Erlander family graves in 2011, including Aina and Tage Erlander's headstone (right)

Aina Erlander was a member of the board of Save the Children and in 1949 travelled to the then West Germany, suffering the effects of World War II. In 1954 she visited the Netherlands, which had been flooded in 1953. In 1957 Erlander became chairperson of Unga Örnar (sv) ('Young Eagles', a children's and youth rights organisation affiliated to the International Falcon Movement – Socialist Educational International), a position she retained for nine years.

After her husband resigned from the premiership in 1969, the couple lived in a house constructed at Bommersvik by the Social Democrats to honor Tage, which was owned by the Swedish Social Democratic Youth League.

Following the death of her husband in 1985, she sorted and edited his papers. She died in 1990, and is buried beside him.
