= Eije Mossberg =

Swedish businessman, civil servant and politician (1908–1997)

Hugo Karl Eije Mossberg
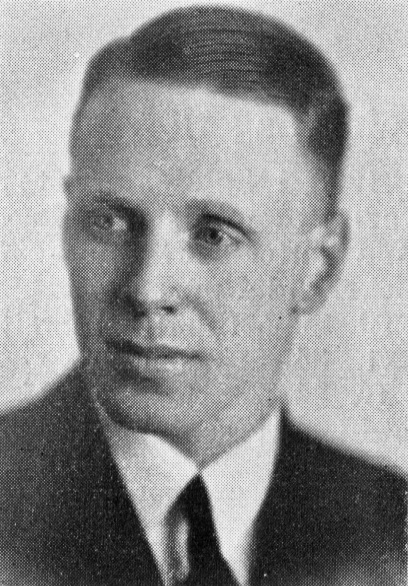
- Eije Mossberg
- Born: 1908; Vaxholm Parish, Stockholm County
- Died: 1987 (aged 78–79); Locarno, Ticino, Switzerland
- Citizenship: Swedish
- Education: Uppsala University
- Occupations: Politician, civil servant, business manager
- Political party: Swedish Social Democrats

Hugo Karl Eije Mossberg (21 January 1908, Vaxholm Parish, Stockholm County – 28 July 1997, Locarno, Ticino, Switzerland) was a Swedish social democratic politician, civil servant and business manager.

== Career ==
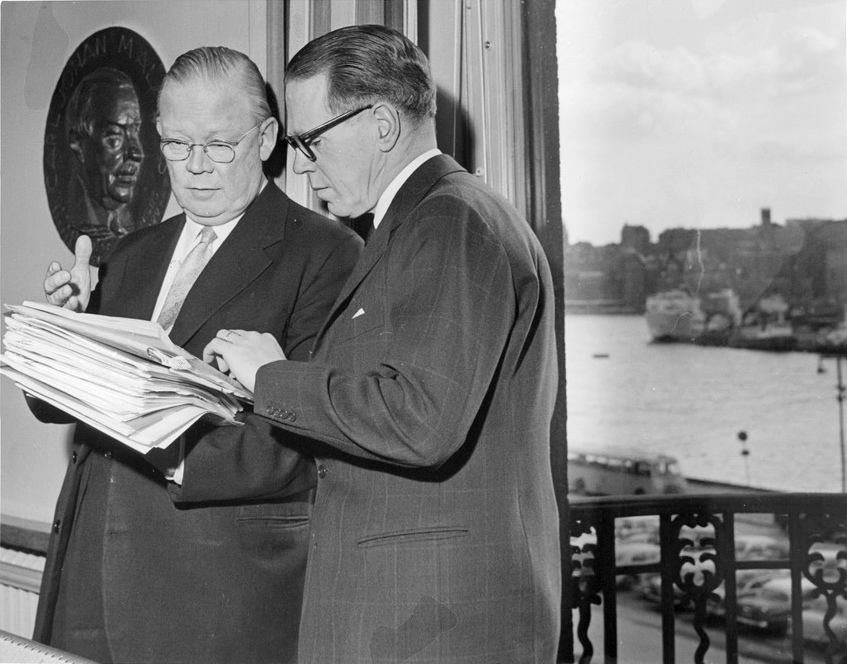
Bertil-Kugelberg and Eije Mossberg

Mossberg obtained a bachelor's degree in law at Uppsala University in 1931, after which he became fiscal at the Svea Court of Appeal in 1935 and assessor there in 1943. He was state secretary in the Ministry of Social Affairs 1944–1945. In the first government of Tage Erlander, he was consultative minister 1945–1947 ("deputy minister of social affairs" with responsibility for the labor market, the police and civil defense) and minister of the interior 1947–1951. He was then governor of Kopparberg county 1951–1957. Mossberg was director of Svenska Cellulosa AB 1957–1960 and managing director in 1960–1972.

Mossberg also served in many government investigations, including as chairman of the Committee for Investigation of Psychological Defense 1951–1953. He also held positions in several trade associations in the pulp and paper industry.

Eije Mossberg was elected in 1946 as a member of the Royal Academy of Military Sciences, in 1961 as a member of the Royal Academy of Forestry and Agriculture and in 1965 as a member of the Royal Academy of Engineering Sciences.
