= Sven Erlander =

Swedish mathematician (1934–2021)

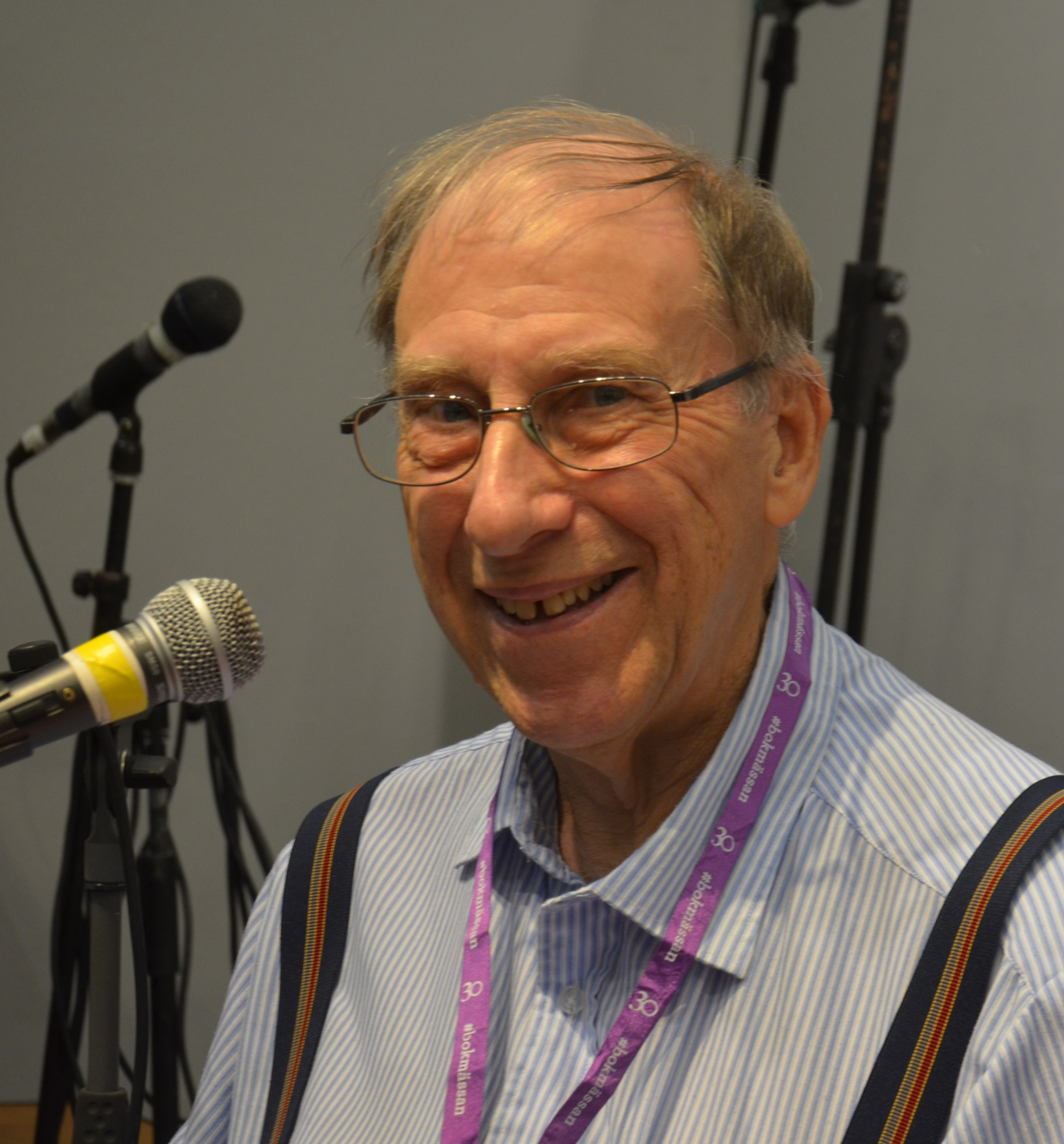
- Sven Erlander, 2014
- Born: 25 May 1934; Halmstad, Sweden
- Died: 13 June 2021 (aged 87); Linköping, Sweden
- Occupations: Professor of mathematics, Rector of Linköping University

Academic background
- Doctoral advisor: Ulf Grenander

Sven Bertil Erlander (25 May 1934 – 13 June 2021) was a Swedish mathematician and academic.

== Biography ==
Erlander was the son of Tage Erlander, who was the Prime Minister of Sweden from 1946 to 1969. He published several of his father's diaries.

He received his PhD in mathematics from Stockholm University in 1968. In 1971 he became a professor in Optimisation at Linköping University. In Linköping he was department head of the Mathematics department from 1973 to 1976, and dean of the Institute of Technology between 1978 and 1983.

In 1983–1995 he was the rector of Linköping University.

== Awards ==
- Member of the Royal Swedish Academy of Engineering Sciences, 1983
- Honorary Doctorate, Gdańsk University, Poland

== Publications ==
- Cost-Minimizing Choice Behavior in Transportation Planning, monograph, Springer Verlag, 2010.
