= List of prime ministers of Sweden =

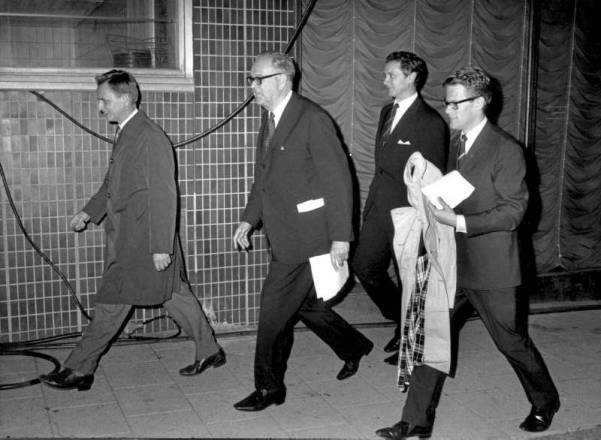
Olof Palme (left), Tage Erlander (center) and Ingvar Carlsson (right) were all prime ministers of Sweden.

Prior to the creation of the office of prime minister in 1876, Sweden did not have a head of government distinct from its head of state, the monarch, who traditionally held all executive authority. Louis De Geer, the architect of the bicameral Riksdag of 1866, which replaced the centuries-old Riksdag of the Estates, became Sweden's first prime minister in 1876. As of 2022, the prime minister of Sweden is Ulf Kristersson, leader of the Moderate Party. The list below contains statistics about the tenures of each of the prime ministers of Sweden since 1876.

== List of prime ministers ==
Before 1876, when the office of prime minister was created, Sweden did not have a head of government separate from the monarch. The most-senior member of the Privy Council during the period of absolute rule was the lord high chancellor, whose role was similar to that of a head of government. That was most evident during the so-called Age of Liberty, from 1718 to 1772, when the monarch's powers were greatly reduced and the president of the Privy Council became the dominant political figure in Sweden.

Colour key

- / Independent and non-partisan
- / Moderate Party and predecessors (Note: The General Electoral League (1904–1938) was formed as a national campaign organisation for the early conservative and protectionist groups represented in the Riksdag. Parties affiliated with the organisation include the Lantmanna Party, the Protectionist Party and the National Party. The various parliamentary groups coalesced into a single party in 1935. The General Electoral League was renamed as the National Organisation of the Right (1938–1952) and the Rightist Party (1952–1969). The present name, Moderate Party, was adopted in 1969.)
- / Liberals and predecessors (Note: The Liberal Coalition Party (1900–1924) was formed from the consolidation of various early liberal, centrist and pro-free trade politicians in the Riksdag. The party split on the issue of prohibition to form the Freeminded People's Party (1924–1934) and the Liberal Party of Sweden (1924–1934). The two parties later reconciled and merged resulting in the formation of the People's Party (1934–1990). The People's Party was renamed as the Liberal People's Party (1990–2015). The present name, Liberals, was adopted in 2015.)
- / Social Democrats (Note: The Social Democrats are officially named the Swedish Social Democratic Workers' Party.)
- / Centre Party (Note: The Centre Party was formerly known as the Farmers' League (1913–1957). The present name was adopted in 1957.)

N°	Name (Lifespan)	Portrait	Term of office			Party (Alliance)	Mandate / Election	Cabinet Parties	Monarch (Reign)
N°	Name (Lifespan)	Portrait	Took office	Left office	Time in office	Party (Alliance)	Mandate / Election	Cabinet Parties	Monarch (Reign)
1	Louis Gerhard De Geer (1818–1896)		20 March 1876	19 April 1880	4 years, 30 days	Independent	1875	L. G. De Geer	Oscar II (1872–1907)
1	Louis Gerhard De Geer (1818–1896)		20 March 1876	19 April 1880	4 years, 30 days	Independent	1878	L. G. De Geer	Oscar II (1872–1907)
2	Arvid Posse (1820–1901)		19 April 1880	13 June 1883	3 years, 55 days	Lantmanna Party	—	Posse	Oscar II (1872–1907)
2	Arvid Posse (1820–1901)		19 April 1880	13 June 1883	3 years, 55 days	Lantmanna Party	1881	Posse	Oscar II (1872–1907)
3	Carl Johan Thyselius (1811–1891)		13 June 1883	16 May 1884	308 days	Independent	—	Thyselius	Oscar II (1872–1907)
4	Robert Themptander (1844–1897)		16 May 1884	6 February 1888	3 years, 266 days	Independent	1884	Themptander	Oscar II (1872–1907)
4	Robert Themptander (1844–1897)		16 May 1884	6 February 1888	3 years, 266 days	Independent	Mar.-Apr. 1887	Themptander	Oscar II (1872–1907)
4	Robert Themptander (1844–1897)		16 May 1884	6 February 1888	3 years, 266 days	Independent	Aug.-Sep. 1887	Themptander	Oscar II (1872–1907)
5	Gillis Bildt (1820–1894)		6 February 1888	12 October 1889	1 year, 248 days	Independent	—	G. Bildt	Oscar II (1872–1907)
6	Gustaf Åkerhielm (1833–1900)		12 October 1889	10 July 1891	1 year, 271 days	Protectionist Party	—	Åkerhielm	Oscar II (1872–1907)
6	Gustaf Åkerhielm (1833–1900)		12 October 1889	10 July 1891	1 year, 271 days	Protectionist Party	1890	Åkerhielm	Oscar II (1872–1907)
7	Erik Gustaf Boström (1842–1907)		10 July 1891	12 September 1900	9 years, 64 days	Protectionist Party	—	Boström I	Oscar II (1872–1907)
7	Erik Gustaf Boström (1842–1907)		10 July 1891	12 September 1900	9 years, 64 days	Protectionist Party	1893	Boström I	Oscar II (1872–1907)
7	Erik Gustaf Boström (1842–1907)		10 July 1891	12 September 1900	9 years, 64 days	Protectionist Party	1896	Boström I	Oscar II (1872–1907)
7	Erik Gustaf Boström (1842–1907)		10 July 1891	12 September 1900	9 years, 64 days	Protectionist Party	1899	Boström I	Oscar II (1872–1907)
8	Fredrik von Otter (1833–1910)		12 September 1900	5 July 1902	1 year, 296 days	Independent	—	von Otter	Oscar II (1872–1907)
(7) (Note: Former Prime Ministers are not counted twice in the numbering if they returned to power.)	Erik Gustaf Boström (1842–1907)		5 July 1902	13 April 1905	2 years, 282 days	Lantmanna Party	—	Boström II	Oscar II (1872–1907)
(7)	Erik Gustaf Boström (1842–1907)		5 July 1902	13 April 1905	2 years, 282 days	Lantmanna Party	1902	Boström II	Oscar II (1872–1907)
9	Johan Ramstedt (1852–1935)		13 April 1905	2 August 1905	111 days	Independent	—	Ramstedt	Oscar II (1872–1907)
10	Christian Lundeberg (1842–1911)		2 August 1905	7 November 1905	97 days	Protectionist Party (General Electoral League)	—	Lundeberg; AvF–LS	Oscar II (1872–1907)
11	Karl Staaff (1860–1915)		7 November 1905	29 May 1906	203 days	Liberal Coalition Party	1905	Staaff I LS	Oscar II (1872–1907)
12	Arvid Lindman (1862–1936)		29 May 1906	7 October 1911	5 years, 131 days	Lantmanna Party (General Electoral League)	—	Lindman I AvF	Oscar II (1872–1907)
12	Arvid Lindman (1862–1936)		29 May 1906	7 October 1911	5 years, 131 days	Lantmanna Party (General Electoral League)	1908	Lindman I AvF	Gustaf V (1907–1950)
(11)	Karl Staaff (1860–1915)		7 October 1911	17 February 1914	2 years, 133 days	Liberal Coalition Party	1911	Staaff II; LS	Gustaf V (1907–1950)
13	Hjalmar Hammarskjöld (1862–1953)		17 February 1914	30 March 1917	3 years, 41 days	Independent	—	Hammarskjöld	Gustaf V (1907–1950)
13	Hjalmar Hammarskjöld (1862–1953)		17 February 1914	30 March 1917	3 years, 41 days	Independent	Mar. 1914	Hammarskjöld	Gustaf V (1907–1950)
13	Hjalmar Hammarskjöld (1862–1953)		17 February 1914	30 March 1917	3 years, 41 days	Independent	Sep. 1914	Hammarskjöld	Gustaf V (1907–1950)
14	Carl Swartz (1858–1926)		30 March 1917	19 October 1917	203 days	National Party (General Electoral League)	—	Swartz; AvF	Gustaf V (1907–1950)
15	Nils Edén (1871–1945)		19 October 1917	10 March 1920	2 years, 143 days	Liberal Coalition Party	1917	Edén; LS–S	Gustaf V (1907–1950)
16	Hjalmar Branting (1860–1925)		10 March 1920	27 October 1920	231 days	Social Democrats	—	Branting I S	Gustaf V (1907–1950)
17	Gerhard Louis De Geer (1854–1935)		27 October 1920	23 February 1921	119 days	Independent	1920	G. L. De Geer	Gustaf V (1907–1950)
18	Oscar von Sydow (1873–1936)		23 February 1921	13 October 1921	232 days	Independent	—	von Sydow	Gustaf V (1907–1950)
(16)	Hjalmar Branting (1860–1925)		13 October 1921	19 April 1923	1 year, 188 days	Social Democrats	1921	Branting II; S	Gustaf V (1907–1950)
19	Ernst Trygger (1857–1943)		19 April 1923	18 October 1924	1 year, 182 days	National Party (General Electoral League)	—	Trygger; AvF	Gustaf V (1907–1950)
(16)	Hjalmar Branting (1860–1925)		18 October 1924	24 January 1925	98 days	Social Democrats	1924	Branting III; S	Gustaf V (1907–1950)
20	Rickard Sandler (1884–1964)		24 January 1925	7 June 1926	1 year, 134 days	Social Democrats	—	Sandler; S	Gustaf V (1907–1950)
21	Carl Gustaf Ekman (1872–1945)		7 June 1926	2 October 1928	2 years, 117 days	Freeminded People's Party	—	Ekman I FF–L	Gustaf V (1907–1950)
(12)	Arvid Lindman (1862–1936)		2 October 1928	7 June 1930	1 year, 248 days	Lantmanna Party (General Electoral League)	1928	Lindman II; AvF	Gustaf V (1907–1950)
(21)	Carl Gustaf Ekman (1872–1945)		7 June 1930	6 August 1932	2 years, 60 days	Freeminded People's Party	—	Ekman II; FF	Gustaf V (1907–1950)
22	Felix Hamrin (1875–1937)		6 August 1932	24 September 1932	49 days	Freeminded People's Party	—	Hamrin; FF	Gustaf V (1907–1950)
23	Per Albin Hansson (1885–1946)		24 September 1932	19 June 1936	3 years, 269 days	Social Democrats	1932	Hansson I S	Gustaf V (1907–1950)
24	Axel Pehrsson-Bramstorp (1883–1954)		19 June 1936	28 September 1936	101 days	Farmers' League	—	Pehrsson-Bramstorp; Bf	Gustaf V (1907–1950)
(23)	Per Albin Hansson (1885–1946)		28 September 1936	6 October 1946 (Note: Died in office)	10 years, 8 days	Social Democrats	1936	Hansson II; S–Bf	Gustaf V (1907–1950)
(23)	Per Albin Hansson (1885–1946)		28 September 1936	6 October 1946	10 years, 8 days	Social Democrats	—	Hansson III; S–Bf–H–F	Gustaf V (1907–1950)
(23)	Per Albin Hansson (1885–1946)		28 September 1936	6 October 1946	10 years, 8 days	Social Democrats	1940	Hansson III; S–Bf–H–F	Gustaf V (1907–1950)
(23)	Per Albin Hansson (1885–1946)		28 September 1936	6 October 1946	10 years, 8 days	Social Democrats	1944	Hansson III; S–Bf–H–F	Gustaf V (1907–1950)
(23)	Per Albin Hansson (1885–1946)		28 September 1936	6 October 1946	10 years, 8 days	Social Democrats	—	Hansson IV; S	Gustaf V (1907–1950)
—	Östen Undén (1886–1974); Acting Prime Minister		6 October 1946	11 October 1946	5 days	Social Democrats	—	Hansson IV; S	Gustaf V (1907–1950)
25	Tage Erlander (1901–1985)		11 October 1946	14 October 1969	23 years, 3 days	Social Democrats	—	Erlander I S	Gustaf V (1907–1950)
25	Tage Erlander (1901–1985)		11 October 1946	14 October 1969	23 years, 3 days	Social Democrats	1948	Erlander I S	Gustaf V (1907–1950)
25	Tage Erlander (1901–1985)		11 October 1946	14 October 1969	23 years, 3 days	Social Democrats	1948	Erlander I S	Gustaf VI Adolf (1950–1973)
25	Tage Erlander (1901–1985)		11 October 1946	14 October 1969	23 years, 3 days	Social Democrats	—	Erlander II; S–Bf	Gustaf VI Adolf (1950–1973)
25	Tage Erlander (1901–1985)		11 October 1946	14 October 1969	23 years, 3 days	Social Democrats	1952	Erlander II; S–Bf	Gustaf VI Adolf (1950–1973)
25	Tage Erlander (1901–1985)		11 October 1946	14 October 1969	23 years, 3 days	Social Democrats	1956	Erlander II; S–Bf	Gustaf VI Adolf (1950–1973)
25	Tage Erlander (1901–1985)		11 October 1946	14 October 1969	23 years, 3 days	Social Democrats	—	Erlander III; S	Gustaf VI Adolf (1950–1973)
25	Tage Erlander (1901–1985)		11 October 1946	14 October 1969	23 years, 3 days	Social Democrats	1958	Erlander III; S	Gustaf VI Adolf (1950–1973)
25	Tage Erlander (1901–1985)		11 October 1946	14 October 1969	23 years, 3 days	Social Democrats	1960	Erlander III; S	Gustaf VI Adolf (1950–1973)
25	Tage Erlander (1901–1985)		11 October 1946	14 October 1969	23 years, 3 days	Social Democrats	1964	Erlander III; S	Gustaf VI Adolf (1950–1973)
25	Tage Erlander (1901–1985)		11 October 1946	14 October 1969	23 years, 3 days	Social Democrats	1968	Erlander III; S	Gustaf VI Adolf (1950–1973)
26	Olof Palme (1927–1986)		14 October 1969	8 October 1976	6 years, 360 days	Social Democrats	—	Palme I S	Gustaf VI Adolf (1950–1973)
26	Olof Palme (1927–1986)		14 October 1969	8 October 1976	6 years, 360 days	Social Democrats	1970	Palme I S	Gustaf VI Adolf (1950–1973)
26	Olof Palme (1927–1986)		14 October 1969	8 October 1976	6 years, 360 days	Social Democrats	1973	Palme I S	Gustaf VI Adolf (1950–1973)
26	Olof Palme (1927–1986)		14 October 1969	8 October 1976	6 years, 360 days	Social Democrats	1973	Palme I S	Carl XVI Gustaf (1973–)
27	Thorbjörn Fälldin (1926–2016)		8 October 1976	18 October 1978	2 years, 10 days	Centre Party	1976	Fälldin I C–M–F	Carl XVI Gustaf (1973–)
28	Ola Ullsten (1931–2018)		18 October 1978	12 October 1979	359 days	People's Party	—	Ullsten; F	Carl XVI Gustaf (1973–)
(27)	Thorbjörn Fälldin (1926–2016)		12 October 1979	8 October 1982	2 years, 361 days	Centre Party	1979	Fälldin II; C–M–F	Carl XVI Gustaf (1973–)
(27)	Thorbjörn Fälldin (1926–2016)		12 October 1979	8 October 1982	2 years, 361 days	Centre Party	—	Fälldin III; C–F	Carl XVI Gustaf (1973–)
(26)	Olof Palme (1927–1986)		8 October 1982	28 February 1986†	3 years, 143 days	Social Democrats	1982	Palme II; S	Carl XVI Gustaf (1973–)
(26)	Olof Palme (1927–1986)		8 October 1982	28 February 1986†	3 years, 143 days	Social Democrats	1985	Palme II; S	Carl XVI Gustaf (1973–)
29	Ingvar Carlsson (Note: Acting Prime Minister from 28 February to 12 March 1986, following the assassination of Olof Palme.) (b. 1934)		28 February 1986	12 March 1986	12 days	Social Democrats	—	Palme II; S	Carl XVI Gustaf (1973–)
29	Ingvar Carlsson (b. 1934)		12 March 1986	4 October 1991	5 years, 206 days	Social Democrats	—	Carlsson I S	Carl XVI Gustaf (1973–)
29	Ingvar Carlsson (b. 1934)		12 March 1986	4 October 1991	5 years, 206 days	Social Democrats	1988	Carlsson I S	Carl XVI Gustaf (1973–)
29	Ingvar Carlsson (b. 1934)		12 March 1986	4 October 1991	5 years, 206 days	Social Democrats	—	Carlsson II; S	Carl XVI Gustaf (1973–)
30	Carl Bildt (b. 1949)		4 October 1991	7 October 1994	3 years, 3 days	Moderate Party	1991	C. Bildt; M–FP–C–KD	Carl XVI Gustaf (1973–)
(29)	Ingvar Carlsson (b. 1934)		7 October 1994	22 March 1996	1 year, 167 days	Social Democrats	1994	Carlsson III; S	Carl XVI Gustaf (1973–)
31	Göran Persson (b. 1949)		22 March 1996	6 October 2006	10 years, 198 days	Social Democrats	—	Persson; S	Carl XVI Gustaf (1973–)
31	Göran Persson (b. 1949)		22 March 1996	6 October 2006	10 years, 198 days	Social Democrats	1998	Persson; S	Carl XVI Gustaf (1973–)
31	Göran Persson (b. 1949)		22 March 1996	6 October 2006	10 years, 198 days	Social Democrats	2002	Persson; S	Carl XVI Gustaf (1973–)
32	Fredrik Reinfeldt (b. 1965)		6 October 2006	3 October 2014	7 years, 362 days	Moderate Party (Alliance for Sweden)	2006	Reinfeldt; M–C–FP–KD	Carl XVI Gustaf (1973–)
32	Fredrik Reinfeldt (b. 1965)		6 October 2006	3 October 2014	7 years, 362 days	Moderate Party (Alliance for Sweden)	2010	Reinfeldt; M–C–FP–KD	Carl XVI Gustaf (1973–)
33	Stefan Löfven (b. 1957)		3 October 2014	30 November 2021	7 years, 58 days	Social Democrats	2014	Löfven I (Note: Defeated by motion of no confidence.); S–MP	Carl XVI Gustaf (1973–)
33	Stefan Löfven (b. 1957)		3 October 2014	30 November 2021	7 years, 58 days	Social Democrats	2018	Löfven II; S–MP	Carl XVI Gustaf (1973–)
33	Stefan Löfven (b. 1957)		3 October 2014	30 November 2021	7 years, 58 days	Social Democrats	—	Löfven III; S–MP	Carl XVI Gustaf (1973–)
34	Magdalena Andersson (b. 1967)		30 November 2021	18 October 2022	322 days	Social Democrats	—	Andersson; S	Carl XVI Gustaf (1973–)
35	Ulf Kristersson (b. 1963)		18 October 2022	Incumbent (Note: Kristersson and his government have remained in office as a caretaker government since 17 September 2026 following his resignation and pending the formation of a new government.)	4 years, 13 days	Moderate Party	2022	Kristersson; M–KD–L	Carl XVI Gustaf (1973–)

== See also ==
- Prime Minister of Sweden
- Deputy Prime Minister of Sweden
- Swedish governmental line of succession
- Elections in Sweden
- List of cabinets of Sweden
- List of Swedish politicians
- List of spouses of prime ministers of Sweden
