= Lantmanna Party =

Party of the Rural People Lantmannapartiet
- Leader: Arvid Posse; Erik Gustaf Boström
- Founded: 1867
- Dissolved: 1912
- Succeeded by: Farmer and Bourgeoisie Party
- Headquarters: Stockholm
- Ideology: Big tent Liberal conservatism Conservative liberalism Agrarianism
- Political position: Centre-right to right-wing
- Colors: Blue

Lantmanna Party (Swedish: Lantmannapartiet, lit. 'Party of the Rural People') was a political party in Sweden during the late 19th century, essentially a faction in the parliament which existed from 1867 to 1912 (though split in two 1888–1895). The Lantmanna Party was founded in 1867, following the representation reform of 1866 which had replaced the old Riksdag of the Estates with the modern Riksdag, assembled for the first time in early 1867. It was represented in the second chamber (Andra kammaren) of the parliament, which was directly elected.

The party originally did not have any clear political ideology but claimed to represent farmers and ordinary people, although it was never a real agrarian party. Many of its first members had been members of the last Estate of Peasants in the old Riksdag of the Estates while one of the informal leaders at the start was Count Arvid Posse. The party was also supported by the main Swedish newspaper at the time, Dagens Nyheter. Posse went on to become Prime Minister of Sweden from 1880 to 1883.

In 1888 the party was split in two parties over the issue on free trade contra protectionism; the free trade advocates founded the Old Lantmanna Party and the protectionists founded the New Lantmanna Party. In 1895 the two parties reunited under its old name. Erik Gustaf Boström of the Lantmanna Party (New Lantmanna Party during the split) was able to form a cabinet twice, as prime minister in 1891–1900 and again in 1902–1905.

By the turn of the century 1900, the party had evolved in an ideologically conservative way, much due to opposition against the liberals and the emerging social democrats. While the party had its base in the parliament and was formed solely by elected members of it, there was no organisation for election campaigns until 1904, when the Lantmanna Party formed the Allmänna valmansförbundet (General Elector Coalition) together with other right-wing fractions in the parliament. In 1912 the Lantmanna Party merged with another of the right-wing fractions of the parliament, the National Progress Party, to form the new Farmer and Bourgeoisie Party (Lantmanna- och borgarepartiet), which came to be known as the andrakammarshögern ('right-wing faction of the second chamber'). This and the Allmänna valmansförbundet eventually evolved into the present Moderate Party.

== Election results ==
Riksdag
Date	Votes			Seats		Position	Size
Date	No.	%	± pp	No.	±	Position	Size
1866				81 / 190	New	Opposition	1st
1869				86 / 192	▲5	Opposition	1st
1872	8,111			90 / 194	▲4	Opposition	1st
1875	10,021			92 / 198	▲2	Opposition	1st
1878	10,453			92 / 204	0	Opposition	1st
1881	14,780			101 / 206	▲9	Opposition	1st
1884	16,404			104 / 214	▲3	Opposition	1st
March–April 1887	Unknown	Unknown	Unknown	Unknown	Unknown	Unknown	Unknown
August–September 1887	31,812	34.6		115 / 222	▲11	Opposition	1st
1890	20,099	53.16	▲18.56	88 / 228	▲27	Opposition	1st
1893	20,887	29.48	▼23.68	75 / 228	▼13	Opposition	1st
1896	42,947	32.12	▲2.64	128 / 230	▲53	Opposition	1st
1899	72,800	53.16	▲21.04	137 / 230	▲9	Opposition	1st
1902	81,703	45.26	▼7.90	119 / 230	▼18	Opposition	2nd
1905	30,300	31.35	▼13.91	57 / 230	▼62	Opposition	2nd
1908	37,512	12.2	▼19.15	52 / 230	▼5	Opposition	2nd
