= Sweden during the late 19th century =

The period following the accession of Oscar II to the throne of Sweden in 1872 was marked by political conflict. The Lantmanna Party, representing peasant proprietors, dominated the Lower House of parliament, and demanded tax reductions and reforms of the system of military service. The Upper House opposed these positions. A compromise was reached in 1884 with reduction in land taxes and increased periods of military service, processes that continued in later years.

In trade policy, advocates of Protectionism gained the upper hand in 1888, and import duties were imposed on barley and other commodities. Pressure grew for extension of the franchise, leading up to the introduction in 1907 of universal manhood suffrage for elections to the Lower House, and a proportional representation system for both Houses.

During King Oscar's reign many important social reforms were implemented. In a spirit of patriotism, physical activity was promoted: compulsory gymnastics was introduced in schools in 1880, and the Swedish Ski Association was formed in 1892.

== Politics in the New Riksdag ==
At the accession of Oscar II to the throne on 18 September 1872, the economic condition of Sweden was fairly satisfactory. In foreign affairs the security situation was good.

Politically, however, the situation was tense as the reforms inaugurated during the preceding reign did not answer expectations. Within three years of the introduction of the new electoral laws, the Louis De Geer ministry had forfeited much of its former popularity, and had been forced to resign. In the vital matter of national defence no common understanding had been arrived at, and during the conflicts which had raged round this question, the two chambers had come into frequent collision and paralysed the action of the government. The peasant proprietors, who, under the name of the "Lantmanna" party, formed a compact majority in the Second Chamber, pursued a consistent policy of class interests in the matter of the taxes and burdens that had, as they urged, so long oppressed the Swedish peasantry; and consequently when a bill was introduced for superseding the old system of army organization by general compulsory service, they demanded as a condition of its acceptance that the military burdens should be more evenly distributed in the country, and that the taxes, which they regarded as a burden under which they had wrongfully groaned for centuries, should be abolished. In these circumstances, the "Lantmanna" party in the Riksdag, who desired the lightening of the military burden, joined those who desired the abolition of landlordism, and formed a compact and predominant majority in the Second Chamber, while the burgher and Liberal parties were reduced to an impotent "intelligence" minority. This majority in the Lower Chamber was at once attacked by another compact majority in the Upper, who on their side maintained that the hated land taxes were only a kind of rent-charge on land, were incidental to it and in no way weighed upon the owners, and moreover that its abolition would be quite unwarrantable, as it was one of the surest sources of revenue to the state. On the other hand, the First Chamber refused to listen to any abolition of the old military system, so long as the defence of the country had not been placed upon a secure basis by the adoption of general compulsory military service. The government stood midway between these conflicting majorities in the chambers, without support in either.

== Lantmanna Party ==
The Swedish "Lantmanna" party was formed in 1867. It consisted mostly of the larger and smaller peasant proprietors, who at the time of the old Riksdag of the Estates were always opposed to the nobility and the clergy. The object of the party was to bring about a fusion between the representatives of the large landed proprietors and the regular peasant proprietors, to support the interests of landed proprietors in general against those of the town representatives, and to resist Crown interference in the administration of local affairs.

Such was the state of affairs when Oscar II of Sweden, surrounded by his late brother's advisers, began his reign. One of his first priorities was to increase the strength of his Royal Swedish Navy, but in consequence of the continued antagonism of the political parties, he was unable to effect much. In the first Riksdag, however, the so-called "compromise", which afterwards played such an important part in Swedish political life, came into existence. It originated in the small "Scania" party in the Upper House, and was devised to establish a modus vivendi between the conflicting parties, i.e. the champions of national defence and those who demanded a lightening of the burdens of taxation. The King himself perceived in the compromise a means of solving the conflicting questions, and warmly approved it. He persuaded his ministers to constitute a special inquiry into the proposed abolition of land taxes, and in the address with which he opened the Riksdag of 1875 laid particular stress upon the necessity of giving attention to the settlement of these two burning questions, and in 1880 again came forward with a new proposal for increasing the number of years of service with the militia. This motion having been rejected, De Geer resigned, and was succeeded by Count Arvid Posse. The new Prime Minister endeavoured to solve the question of defence in accordance with the views of the "Lantmanna" party. Three parliamentary committees had prepared schemes for a remission of the land taxes, for a new system of taxation, for a reorganization of the Swedish Army based on a "stamtrupp" (regular army), by the enlistment of hired soldiers, and for naval reforms. In this last connection the most suitable types of vessels for coast defence as for offence were determined upon. But Count Posse, deserted by his own party over the army bill, resigned, and was succeeded on 16 May 1884 by Robert Themptander, who had been minister of finance in the previous cabinet. The new premier succeeded in persuading the Riksdag to pass a bill increasing the period of service with the colours in the army to six years and that in the militia to forty-two days, and as a set-off a remission of 30% on the land taxes.

== Free trade vs. protectionism ==
Influenced by the economic reaction which took place in 1879 in consequence of the state of affairs in Germany, where Bismarck had introduced the protectionist system, a Protectionist party had been formed, which tried to gain adherents in the Riksdag. It is true that in the Riksdag of 1882 the commercial treaty with France was renewed, but since 1885 the protectionist party was prepared to begin the combat, and a duty on barley, which had been proposed in the Riksdag of the same year, was rejected by only a slight majority. During the period of the unusually low price of barley of 1886, which greatly affected the Swedish farmers, protection gained ground to such an extent that its final triumph was considered as certain within a short time. During the Riksdag of the same year, however, the premier, Themptander, emphatically declared himself against the protectionist party, and while the parties in the Second Chamber were equal in number, the proposed tax on barley was rejected in the First Chamber. In the Riksdag of 1887 there was a majority for protection in the Second Chamber, and in the first the majority against the tax was so small that the tax on barley would have triumphed in a combined meeting of the two chambers. The government, availing itself of its formal right not to dissolve the chamber in which it had the support of a majority, therefore dissolved only the Second Chamber in March 1887.

The new Riksdag assembled in May with a free trade majority in the Second Chamber, but nothing in connection with the great question of customs was settled. In the meantime, the powerful majority in the Second Chamber split into two groups the new "Lantmanna" party, which approved protection in the interests of agricultural classes; and a somewhat smaller group, the old "Lantmanna" party, which favored free trade.

The victory of the free traders was not to be of long duration. The protectionists obtained a majority in both chambers in the next Riksdag in 1888. To the First Chamber protectionists were almost exclusively elected, and in the Second all the twenty-two members for Stockholm were disqualified, owing to one of their number not having paid his taxes a few years previously, which prevented his being eligible. Instead, then, of twenty-two free traders representing the majority of the Stockholm electors, twenty-two protectionists, representing the minority, were elected, and Stockholm was thus represented in the Riksdag by the choice of a minority in the capital. This singular way of electing members for the principal city in the kingdom could not fail further to irritate the parties. One result of the Stockholm election came at a convenient time for the Themptander ministry. The financial affairs of the country were found to be in a most unsatisfactory state. In spite of reduced expenses, a highly estimated revenue, and the contemplated raising of taxes, there was a deficit, for the payment or discharge of which the government would be obliged to demand supplementary supplies. The Themptander ministry resigned. The King retained, however, for a time several members of the ministry, but it was difficult to find a premier who would be able, during the transition from one system to another, to command sufficient authority to control the parties. At last Baron Gillis Bildt, who, while Swedish ambassador in Berlin, had witnessed the introduction by Otto von Bismarck of the agrarian protectionist system in Germany, accepted the premiership, and it was under his auspices that the two chambers imposed a series of duties on necessaries of life. The new taxes, together with an increase of the excise duty on spirits, soon brought a surplus into the state coffers. At a Council of State on 12 October 1888 the king declared his wishes as to the way in which this surplus should be used. He desired that it should be applied to a fund for insurance and old age pensions for workmen and old people, to the lightening of the municipal taxes by state contributions to the schools and workhouses, to the abolition of the land taxes and of the obligation of keeping a horse and man for military service, and, lastly, to the improvement of the shipping trade; but the Riksdag decided to devote it to other objects, such as the payment of the deficit in the budget, the building of railways and augmentation of their material, as well as to improvements in the defenses of the country.

== The Barley Question ==
Baron Bildt resigned as soon as the new system seemed settled, making room for Baron Gustaf Åkerhielm. The latter, however, also soon resigned, and was succeeded on 10 July 1891 by Erik Gustaf Boström, a landed proprietor. The protectionist system gained in favour on the expiry of the commercial treaty with France in 1892, as it could now be extended to articles of industry. The elections of 1890, when the metropolis returned free traders and Liberals to the Second Chamber, certainly effected a change in the latter, as the representatives of the towns and the old "Lantmanna" party joined issue and established a free-trade majority in the chamber, but in the combined meetings of the two chambers the compact protectionist majority in the First Chamber turned the scale. The customs duties were, however, altered several times in accordance with market prices and ruling circumstances. When the import duty on ungrounded barley was reduced in 1892, the same duties were also retained for the following year. They were also retained for 1894 at the request of the government, which desired to keep faith with their promise that while the new organization of the army was going on no increase of duties on the necessaries of life should take place. This measure caused much dissatisfaction, and gave rise to a strong agrarian movement in consequence of which the government, in the beginning of 1895, before the assembling of the Riksdag, made use of its right of raising the two duties on barley just referred to, which were afterwards somewhat reduced as far as seed barley for sowing purposes was concerned.

== Reorganization of the army ==
The tariff issue now settled, that of national defence was taken up afresh, and in the following year the government produced a complete scheme for the abolition of the land tax in the course of ten years, in exchange for a compensation of ninety days' drill for those liable to military service, proposed to retain the old military system of the country and to strengthen the defences of Norrland, and the government bill for a reorganization of the Swedish Army was accepted by the Riksdag in an extraordinary session. But it was soon perceived that the new plan was unsatisfactory and required recasting, upon which the minister of war, Baron Rappe, resigned, and was succeeded by Colonel von Crustebjörn, who immediately set to work to prepare a complete reorganization of the army, with an increase of the time of active service on the lines of general compulsory service. The Riksdag of 1900, in addition to grants for the fortifications at Boden, in Norrbotten County, on the border of Russian-controlled Finland, and other military objects, voted a considerable grant for an experimental mobilization, which fully exposed the defects and faults of the old system. In the Riksdag of 1901 Gustaf Boström resigned, and was succeeded by Admiral Fredrik von Otter, who introduced a new bill for the army reorganization, the most important item of which was the increase of the period of training to 365 days. The cost in connexion with the new scheme was expected to amount to 22 million Kronor. The Riksdag, however did not accept the new plan in its full extent. The time of drilling was reduced to 240 days for the infantry, to 300 days for the navy, while for the cavalry and artillery the time fixed was 365 days. The plan, thus modified, was then accepted by the government.

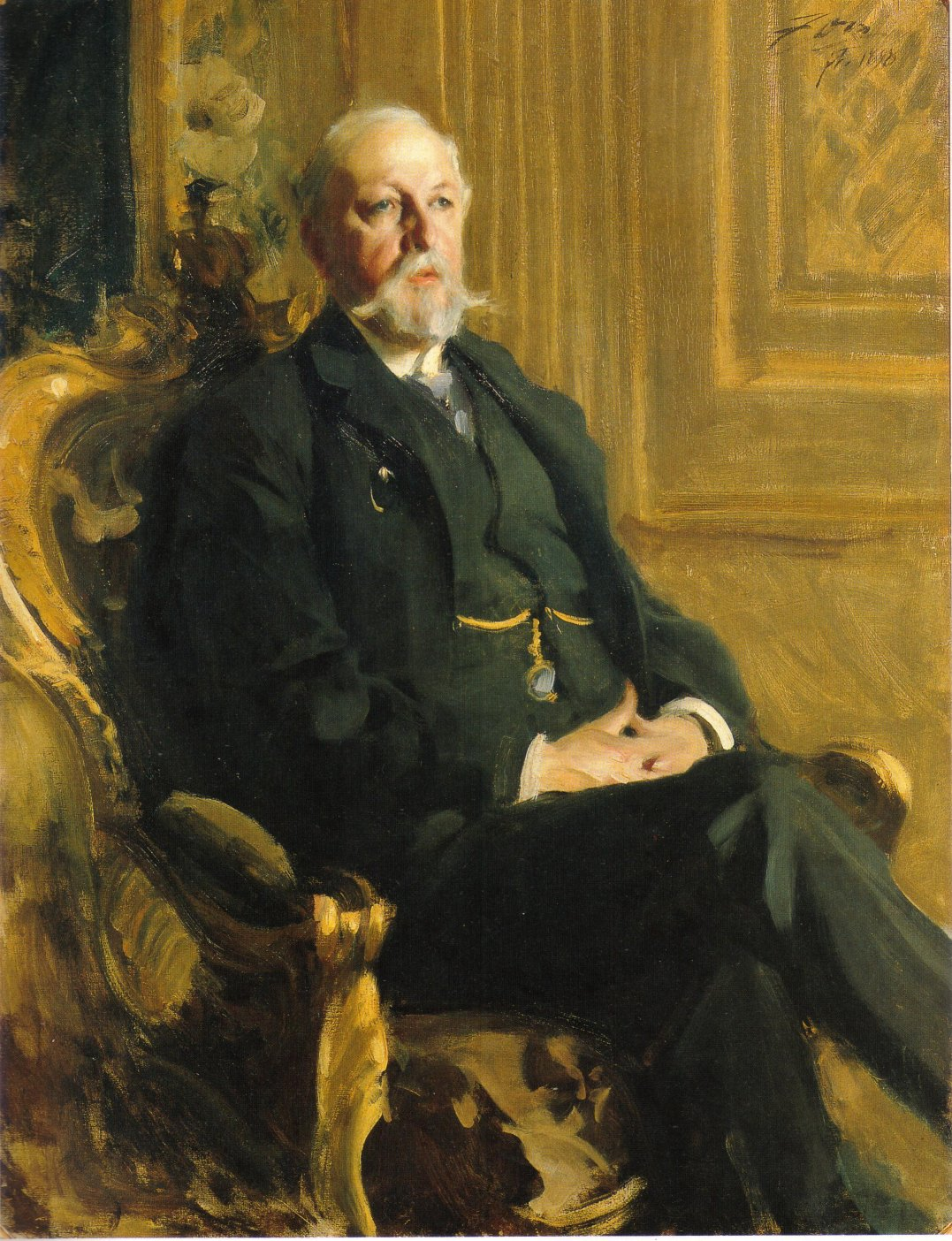
Oscar II (1829–1907)

== Health ==
The steady decline of death rates in Sweden began about 1820. For men and women of working age the death rate trend diverged, however, leading to increased excess male mortality during the first half of the century. There were very high rates of infant and child mortality before 1800, Among infants and children between the ages of one and four smallpox peaked as a cause of death in the 1770s–1780s and declined afterward. Mortality also peaked during this period due to other air-, food-, and waterborne diseases, but these declined as well during the early 19th century. The decline of several diseases during this time created a more favorable environment that increased children's resistance to disease and dramatically lowered child mortality.

The introduction of compulsory gymnastics in Swedish schools in 1880 rested partly on a long tradition, from Renaissance humanism to the Enlightenment, of the importance of physical as well as intellectual training. More immediately, the promotion of gymnastics as a scientifically sound form of physical discipline coincided with the introduction of conscription, which gave the state a strong interest in educating children physically as well as mentally for the role of citizen soldiers. Skiing is a major recreation in Sweden and its ideological, functional, ecological, and social impact has been great on Swedish nationalism and consciousness. Swedes perceived skiing as virtuous, masculine, heroic, in harmony with nature, and part of the country's culture. A growing awareness of strong national sentiments and an appreciation of natural resources led to the creation of the Swedish Ski Association in 1892 in order to combine nature, leisure, and nationalism. The organization focused its efforts on patriotic, militaristic, heroic, and environmental Swedish traditions as they relate to ski sports and outdoor life.

== Extending the voting franchise ==
After the elections in 1890, the alliance already mentioned between the old "Lantmanna" party and the representatives of the towns had the result that the Liberals in the Second Chamber, to whom the representatives of the towns mostly belonged, were now in a position to decide the policy which the two united parties should follow. In order to prevent this, it was proposed to readjust the number of the members of the Riksdag. The question was only settled in 1894, when a bill was passed fixing the number of the members of the Riksdag in the First Chamber at 150, and in the Second at 230, of which 150 should represent the country districts and 80 the towns. The question of protection being now considered settled, there was no longer any reason for the continued separation of the two "Lantmanna" parties, who at the beginning of the Riksdag of 1895 joined issue and became once more a compact majority in the Second Chamber, as they had been up to the Riksdag of May 1887. The influence of the country representatives was thus re-established in the Second Chamber, but now the demands for the extension of the franchise came more and more to the front, and the premier, Gustaf Boström, at last felt bound to do something to meet these demands. He accordingly introduced in the Riksdag of 1896 a very moderate bill for the extension of the franchise, which was, nevertheless, rejected by both chambers, all similar proposals by private members meeting the same fate. When at last the bill for the reorganization of the army, together with a considerably increased taxation, was accepted by the Riksdag of 1901, it was generally acknowledged that, in return for the increased taxation, it would only be just to extend the right of taking part in the political life and the legislative work of the country to those of the population who hitherto had been excluded from it. The government eventually laid a proposal for the extension of the franchise before the Riksdag of 1902, the chief feature of which was that the elector should be twenty-five years of age, and that married men over forty years should be entitled to two votes. The Riksdag, however, finally agreed to a proposal by Bishop Billing, a member of the First Chamber, that an address should be presented to the king asking for a full inquiry into the question of extending the franchise for the election of members to the Second Chamber.

In 1897 the Riksdag had received among its members the first socialist representative in the person of Hjalmar Branting, the leader of the Swedish Social Democrats. The socialists, who had formerly confined their activity to in 1902. Processions of many thousands of workmen were organized, in Stockholm and in other towns of the kingdom, just before the Riksdag began the discussion on the above-mentioned bill of the government, and when the bill was introduced in the chambers a general and well organized strike took place and continued during the three days the debate on the bill lasted. As this strike was of an exclusively political kind, and was intended to put pressure on the chambers, it was generally disapproved, and failed in its object. The Prime Minister, Admiral Fredrik von Otter, resigned shortly after the end of the session, and was succeeded by Gustaf Boström, the expremier, who at the request of the king again assumed office.

The question of the extension of the franchise, which was a burning one, was to be the principal measure of the Staaff government. It brought in a bill for manhood suffrage at elections for the Second Chamber, together with single member constituencies and election on the absolute majority principle. The bill was passed by the Second Chamber on 15 May 1906 by 134 to 94 votes, but it was rejected by the First Chamber by 126 to 18. The latter chamber instead passed a bill for manhood suffrage at elections for the Second Chamber, on the condition that the elections for both chambers should take place on the basis of proportional representation. Both chambers thereupon decided to ask the opinion of the king with regard to the simultaneous extension of the franchise to women at elections for the Second Chamber. The government bill having, however, been passed by the Second Chamber, the Prime Minister proposed to the king that the Riksdag should be dissolved and new elections for the Second Chamber take place in order to hear the opinion of the country, but as the king did not approve of this Mr Staaff and his government resigned.

A Conservative government was then formed on 29 May by Admiral Arvid Lindman, whose principal task was to find a solution of the suffrage question which both chambers could accept. A government bill was introduced, proposing the settlement of the question on the basis of the bill carried by the First Chamber in the Riksdag of the preceding year. A compromise, approved of by the government, was adopted by the First Chamber on 14 May 1907 by 110 votes against 29 and in the Second Chamber by 128 against 98. By this act proportional representation was established for both chambers, together with universal manhood suffrage at elections for the Second Chamber, a reduction of the qualifications for eligibility for the First Chamber and a reduction of the electoral term of this chamber from nine to six years, and finally payment of members of the First Chamber, who hitherto had not received any such emolument.

== Social reforms ==
King Oscar II died on 8 December 1907, sincerely mourned by his people, and was succeeded as king of Sweden by his eldest son, Prince Gustaf. During King Oscar's reign many important social reforms were carried out by the legislature, and the country developed in all directions. In the Riksdag of 1884 a new patent law was adopted. The age at which women should be held to attain their majority was fixed at twenty-one years and the barbarous prison punishment of "bread and water" abolished. In order to meet the cost of the new Swedish Army organization the Riksdag of 1902 increased the revenue by progressive taxation, but only for one year. Bills for the improvement of the social conditions of the people and in the interests of the working classes were also passed. During the five years 1884–1889 a committee was occupied with the question of workmen's insurance, and thrice the government made proposals for its settlement, on the last occasion adopting the principle of invalidity as a common basis for insurance against accidents, illness or old age. The Riksdag, however, delayed coming to a decision, and contented itself by earmarking money for an insurance fund. At last the Riksdag of 1901 accepted a bill for insurance against accidents which also extended to agricultural labourers, in connection with the establishment of a state institution for insurance. The bill for protection against accidents, as well as for the limitation of working hours for women and children, was passed, together with one for the appointment of special factory inspectors. When in 1897 King Oscar celebrated his jubilee of twenty-five years as king, the exhibition ("Konst- och Industriutställningen") which had been organized in Stockholm offered a convincing proof of the progress the country had made in every direction.

== See also ==
- Prime Minister of Sweden
- Privy Council of Sweden
- Wismar
