= Arvid Posse =

2nd Prime Minister of Sweden (1820-1901)

His Excellency The High Well-born Count Arvid Posse RoKavKMO StkNS:tOO LLA HedLÖS
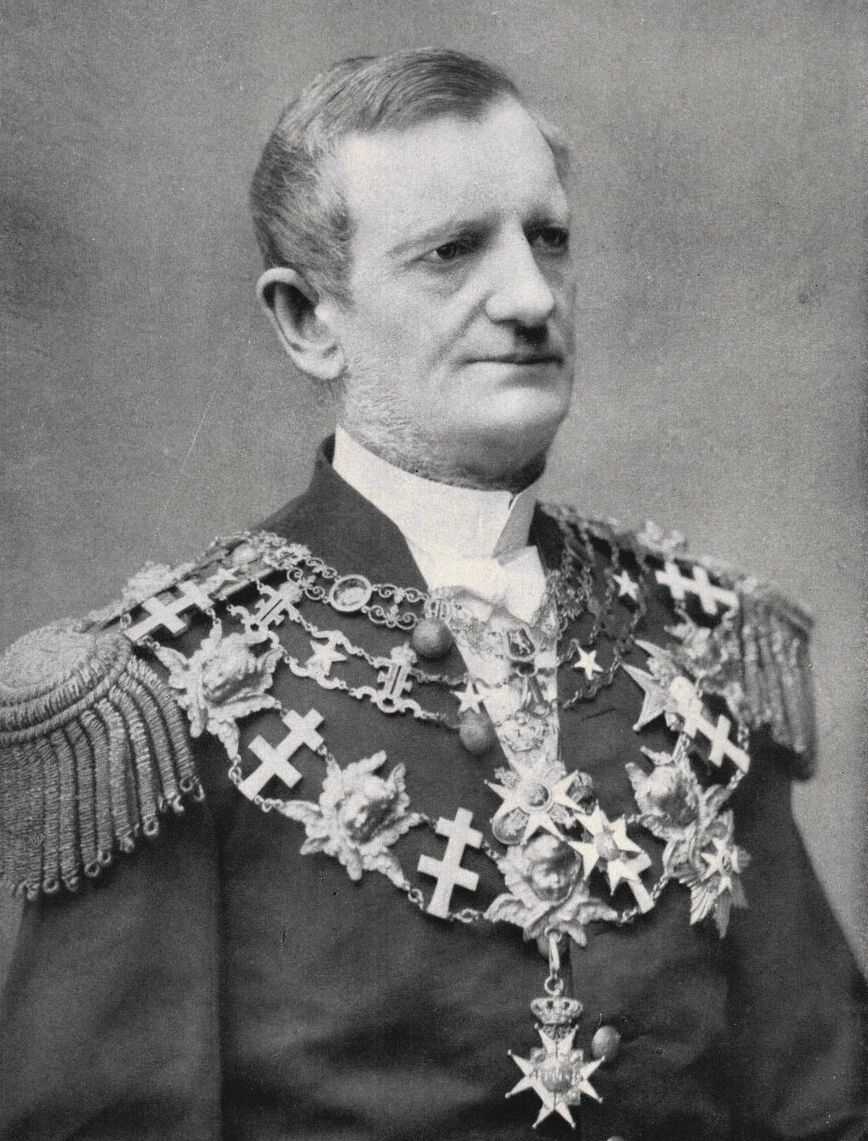

Prime Minister of Sweden
- In office 19 April 1880 – 13 June 1883
- Monarch: Oscar II of Sweden
- Preceded by: Louis De Geer the Elder
- Succeeded by: Carl Johan Thyselius

10th Minister for Finance of Sweden
- In office 7 December 1880 – 8 March 1881
- Prime Minister: Himself
- Preceded by: Hans Ludvig Forssell
- Succeeded by: Robert Themptander

3rd Speaker of the Second Chamber
- In office 15 January 1876 – 15 May 1880
- Preceded by: Ferdinand Asker
- Succeeded by: Olof Wijk the Younger

Personal details
- Born: 15 February 1820 Helsingborg, Sweden
- Died: 24 April 1901 (aged 81) Stockholm, Sweden
- Resting place: Snårestad Cemetery
- Party: Lantmanna Party
- Spouses: Amalia De la Gardie (m. 1846; died 1883) Augusta Hägerflycht (m. 1886)
- Children: 4
- Parent(s): Fredrik Salomon Posse; Magdalena Charlotta Bennet
- Relatives: Posse family
- Education: Lund University
- Cabinet: Posse cabinet

Count Arvid Rutger Fredriksson Posse (15 February 1820 – 24 April 1901) was a Swedish statesman and estate owner who served as Prime Minister of Sweden from 1880 to 1883. He represented the Knights and the Nobility in the Riksdag of the Estates from 1856 to 1866. An influential figure of the Lantmanna Party, he was later also a member of the Riksdag (MP), first of the lower house from 1867 to 1881, and then of the upper house from 1882 to 1890; he served in the former from 1876 to 1880 as Speaker of the lower house of the Riksdag.

== Family background and education ==
Posse was born at Rosendal Castle in Malmöhus County, as the son of Governor Count Fredrik Salomon Posse and Baroness Magdalena Charlotta Bennet. In 1835 he enrolled at Lund University, receiving a law degree in 1840. The same year, he began as a trainee at the Scania and Blekinge Court of Appeal, during which time he worked both at district courts and at the Court of Appeal itself. Later, he was appointed assistant district judge (vice häradshövding) and in 1846 a clerk at the Court of Appeal, and in 1847 was made an associate justice at the court. In 1849 Posse left public service and resettled at Charlottenlund Castle and devoted his time to agriculture, enterprise and local politics (being, e.g., 1865–68 the president of Malmöhus County Council).

== Political career ==
Posse began his political career as a member of the House of Nobility at the Parliament of 1856–58. He was then the Chairman of the Committee on Banking and Currency. In the Parliament of 1862-63 he chaired the Committee of Ways and Means, where he was a strong proponent of the principles of free trade, which he would remain throughout his life. During this Parliament, he seriously objected to proposed amendments to the Law on Local Self-Government concerning proposed restrictions on the vote shares of larger land-owners. He feared, among other things, that the amendments, if adopted, could undermine the proposed electoral reform. Posse himself, however, did not support the reform. On the contrary, he was one of the most ardent opponents of the reform and predicted at the Parliament of 1865–66, when he was Chairman of the Committee of Supply, that the fatherland would meet with an unhappy future if the reform were carried through. Among other things, he feared the new electoral system would put too much power into the hands of the agrarian interests, who would soon forget "the many things that have to live both above and beside them". Notwithstanding this statement, at the first session of the Riksdag's Second Chamber in 1867, Posse became the self-appointed spokesman for the agrarian group, effectively making him the indisputed leader of the new Second Chamber. From this group was formed the Lantmanna Party, which, with Posse as leader, soon adopted an oppositional stance towards the Government. For a number of years Posse remained unquestionably the most prominent and powerful personality in Parliament, even if not the most charismatic.

During 1867–1881 Posse was a member of the Second Chamber, representing the district of Herrestad och Ljunit Hundreds, outside Ystad. In 1867-75 he was Chairman of the Committee of Supply (at the Extra Parliament of 1871 he was the Vice Chairman of the Select Committee (Särskilda utskottet)). As Speaker 1876–1880 he was in charge of the business of the Second Chamber. He entered government on 19 April 1880, being appointed Prime Minister, following the resignation of Baron Louis Gerhard De Geer. Additionally Posse was Minister of Finance from 7 December 1880 to 8 March 1881.

== Prime minister and administrative court president ==
As prime minister, Posse now had to solve the important issues that had been on the agenda since the reform of Parliament. The issues concerned the proposed abolition of both the allotment system and the land taxes (grundskatter) as part of a re-organization of the military. The odds seemed to be in favor of success, since it was believed that he could count on support from old party friends, and among the opponents of the preceding governments. Large committees were appointed to report on the issues. At the Parliament of 1883 the Posse Government tabled their proposals. They promised a step-by-step removal of the land taxes, and the tenement and allotment duties. In return the Posse wanted Parliament to approve the Government's proposals to establish a military based partly on permanently drafted soldiers (enrolled voluntarily and paid by the state) and partly on conscription. However, the Upper House's insistence on retaining the allotment system, and, perhaps more importantly, the Lantmanna Party's cutbacks, led to a series of dramas and a defeat for Posse, following which he resigned as Prime Minister on 13 June 1883. He was then appointed President of the Administrative Court of Appeal, which he remained until 1889.

== Political and scientific work ==
As member of the First Chamber for South Kalmar County 1882–1890, Posse kept a low profile, but opposed the introduction of grain tariffs during the 1887 struggle between free traders and protectionists. He also expressed his sympathies for a moderate suffrage reform. When speaking in Parliament, Posse expressed himself succinctly and clearly, often emphatically but always with calm and dignity. He was elected a member of the Royal Swedish Academy of Agriculture and Forestry (1879) and an honorary member of the Royal Physiographic Society in Lund (1878) and the Royal Swedish Society of Naval Sciences (1880). He died on 24 April 1901 in Stockholm.

== Relatives ==
In 1912, his niece, Sigrid Lindström (née Posse) (1856–1946), survived the sinking of RMS Titanic as a first-class passenger.

Political offices
Preceded by Louis Gerhard De Geer	Prime Minister of Sweden; 19 April 1880–13 June 1883	Succeeded by Carl Johan Thyselius
