= 1899 Swedish general election =

- 22 September 1899

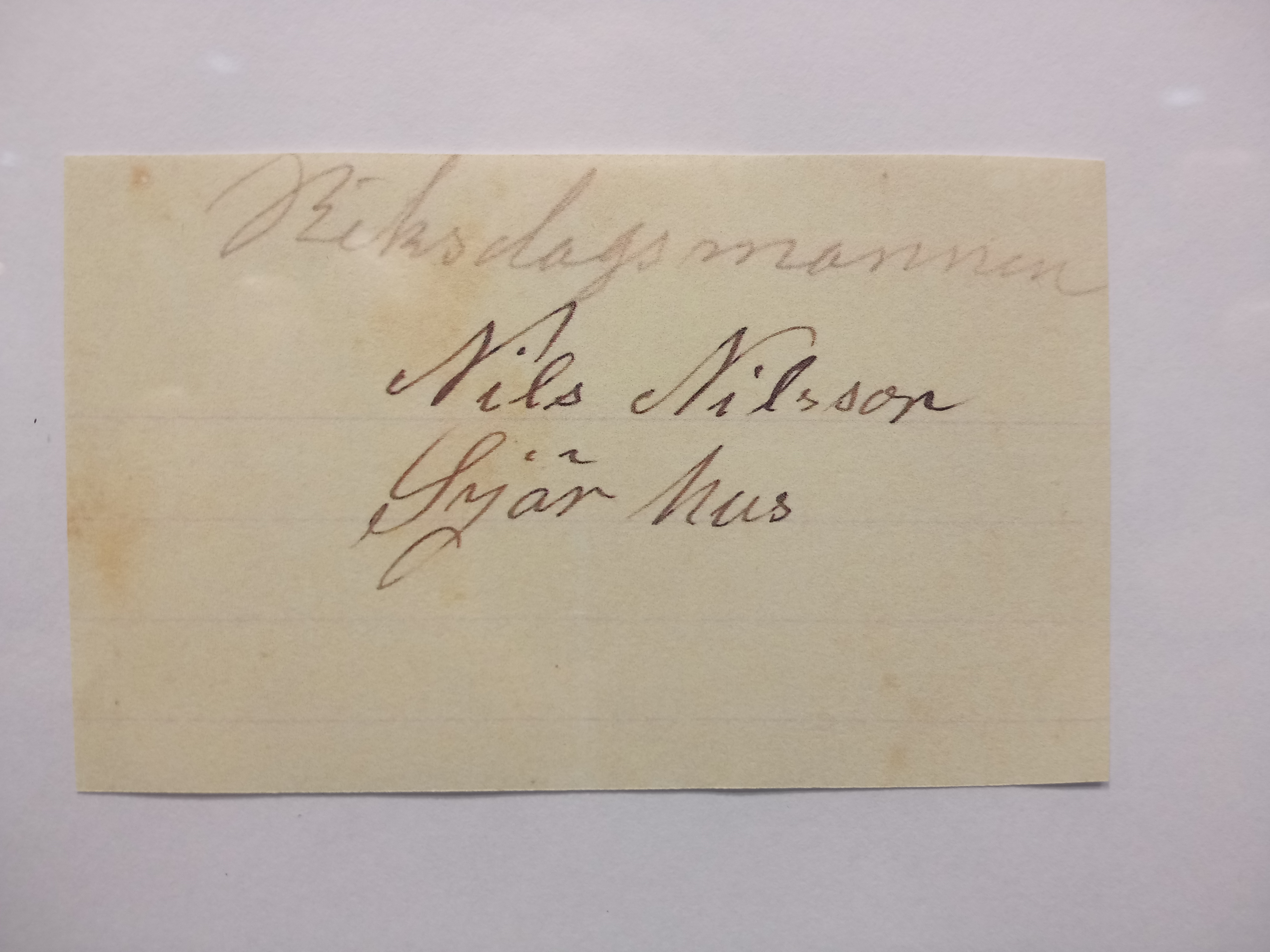
Example of ballot paper used for election

General elections were held in Sweden on 22 September 1899. The Lantmanna Party received a majority of the vote. Erik Gustaf Boström remained Prime Minister.

== Campaign ==
The Liberals and the Swedish Social Democratic Party ran joint lists in some constituencies.

== Results ==
Only 25% of the male population aged over 21 was eligible to vote. Voter turnout was 40%.

| Party | Votes | % | Seats | +/– |
|---|---|---|---|---|
| Lantmanna Party | 72,800 | 53.16 | 137 | +39 |
| Liberals | 64,145 | 46.84 | 92 | +19 |
| Swedish Social Democratic Party | 64,145 | 46.84 | 1 | 0 |
| Total | 136,945 | 100.00 | 230 | 0 |
| Registered voters/turnout | 339,876 | – | | |
Source: Mackie & Rose
