= Claes Tholin =

Swedish politician (1860–1927)

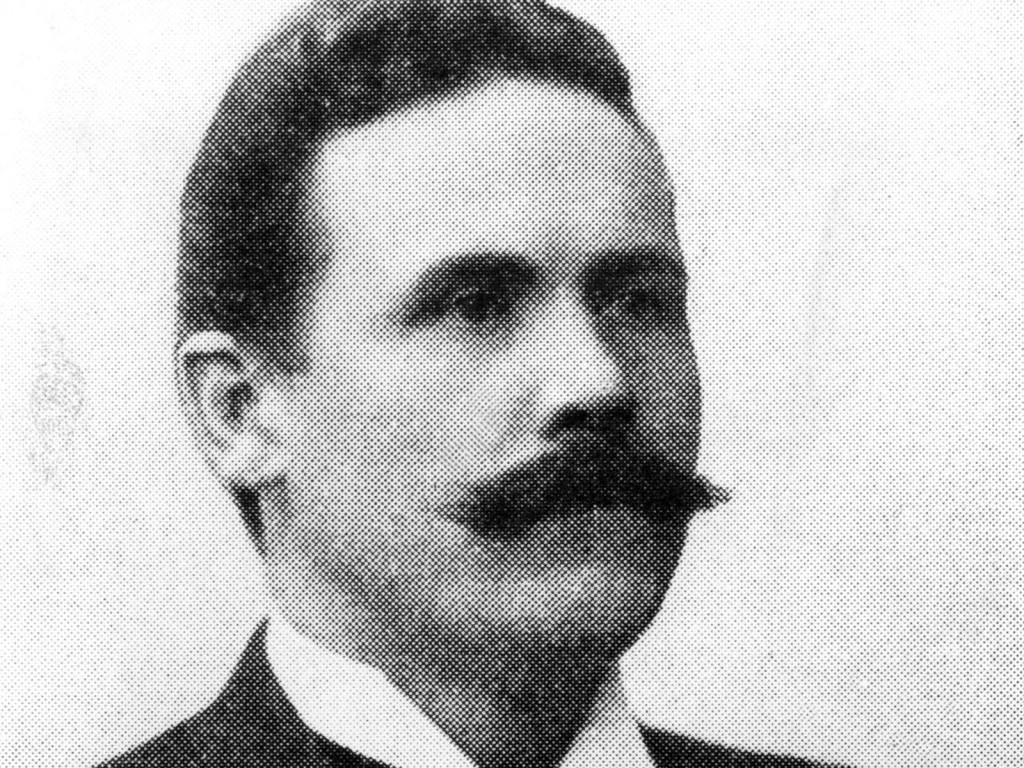
Claes Tholin

Claes Emil Tholin (born 22 October 1860 in the former Södra Säm parish near Gällstad, Älvsborgs län) was the first leader of the Swedish Social Democratic Party 1896–1907, after collective leadership had been applied in 1889–1896. He was a tailor by occupation. In the years 1880–1890 he worked in Copenhagen and became a member of the tailor's union board there. After returning to Sweden he continued his work as a tailor while becoming a leading force in the Swedish social democratic movement.

In 1907, he was hired by the Swedish Trade Union Confederation (the "LO" - Landsorganisationen i Sverige) as their organizing ombudsman, coordinating organization efforts and speaking at rallies. He continued this work until 1919, when he became a member of Work Council tasked by the government with implementing the eight hour day.

Party political offices
Preceded by Collective leadership	Leader of the Swedish Social Democratic Party; 1896–1907	Succeeded by Hjalmar Branting
