= 1896 Swedish general election =

- September 1896

General elections were held in Sweden in September 1896. The Lantmanna Party received a narrow plurality of the vote. Erik Gustaf Boström remained Prime Minister.

== Campaign ==
The Liberals and the Swedish Social Democratic Party ran joint lists in some constituencies.

== Results ==
Only 24% of the male population aged over 21 was eligible to vote. Voter turnout was 45%.

Party	Votes	%	Seats	+/–
Lantmanna Party	54,282	38.61	98	+12
Liberals	53,388	37.97	73	–3
Swedish Social Democratic Party	53,388	37.97	1	+1
Moderate Free Traders	32,918	23.41	58	–8
Total	140,588	100.00	230	+2
Registered voters/turnout	309,889	–		
Source: Mackie & Rose
