= 1872 Swedish general election =

General elections were held in Sweden in 1872 to elect the Second Chamber of the Riksdag for a three-year term. Following the elections, the Lantmanna Party was the largest party, holding 90 of the 194 seats.

== Electoral system ==
Suffrage was given to men over the age of 21 who either had a taxable income of at least 800 riksdaler a year, owned a property worth at least 1,000 riksdaler, or rented a property taxed to at least 6,000 riksdaler. Of a total population of 4.2 million, only 236,120 people (6%) were eligible to vote.

The Second Chamber had one representative from every Domsaga (or two for Domsaga with a population over 40,000) and one representative for every 10,000 residents of a town (with smaller towns merged into combined constituencies). Candidates were required to be at least 25 years old.

Direct elections were held in 22 of the 24 urban constituencies and 60 of the 138 rural constituencies. In the other 80 constituencies, the elections were indirect and carried out using electors.

== Results ==
Party	Votes	%	Seats
Lantmanna Party			90
Centre Party			21
Independents			83
Total			194
Total votes	45,198	–	
Registered voters/turnout	236,120	19.14	
Source: Norberg et al. Nohlen & Stöver
