= Ebba Boström =

Swedish nurse and philanthropist (1844–1902)

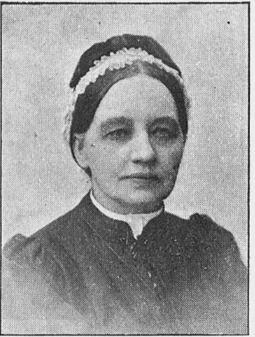
- Born: Ebba Augusta Boström; 5 September 1844; Östanå
- Died: 5 October 1902 (aged 58); Uppsala
- Resting place: Gamla cemetery, Uppsala
- Occupation: Nurse
- Years active: 1881–1902

Ebba Boström (1844–1902) was a Swedish nurse and a philanthropist. She established a philanthropic centre in Uppsala which served the poor and children.

== Early life and education ==
Boström was born in Östanå manor in Roslagen on 5 September 1844. She hailed from a noble family on her mother’s side, and her father was a judge. She had two sisters who married to the members of the noble von Bahr family. She also had two brothers: Erik Gustaf Boström, prime minister of Sweden between 1891 and 1900 and Filip August Boström, governor of Södermanland between 1887 and 1908.

She was trained at the Deaconess Institution of Milmay as a nurse in England. During her studies she became part of the Evangelical revival movement in London and Manchester.

== Career ==
Boström returned to Sweden in 1882 following her graduation. She became the director of a morality association named Magdalenahem (Swedish: Magdalene home) for prostitutes in Uppsala in 1883. The same year she bought a property of her own to establish a philanthropic centre which would include a children’s home, a reform school for female servants, and a hospital. The latter was opened in 1893. She founded the Samariterhemmet foundation in Uppsala, being a deaconess home in Sweden. Later she handed over all of her philanthropic facilities to the foundation in 1899.

== Death ==
Boström died of kidney disease on 5 October 1902 and was buried at the Gamla cemetery in Uppsala.
