= 1890 Swedish general election =

- August-September 1890

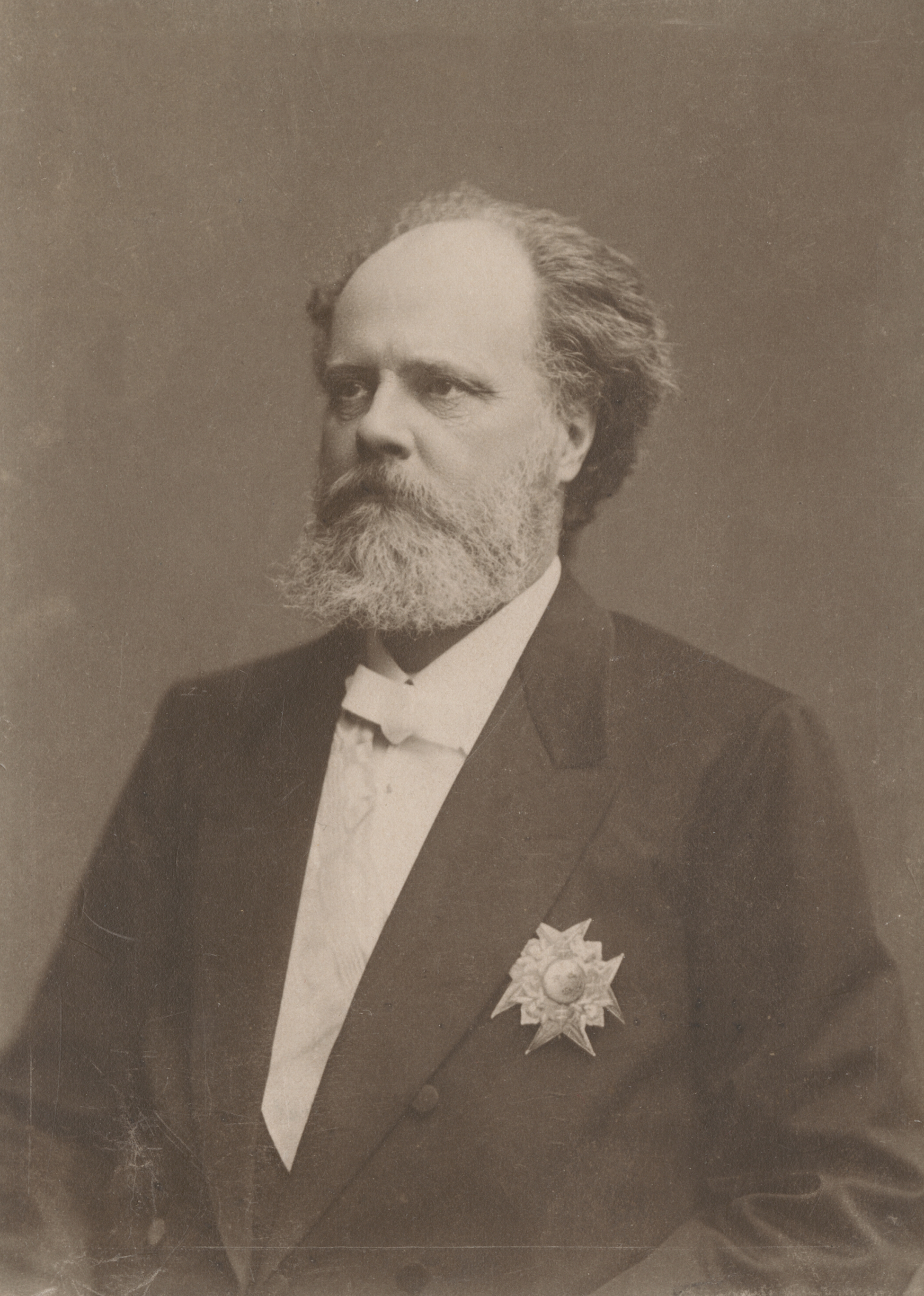
Prime Minister Åkerhielm

General elections were held in Sweden in 1890. Pro-free trade candidates received a majority of the vote. Gustaf Åkerhielm remained Prime Minister.

== Campaign ==
The Free Traders and the new Swedish Social Democratic Party ran joint lists in some constituencies.

== Results ==
Only 23% of the male population aged over 21 was eligible to vote. Voter turnout was 39%.

Party	Votes	%	Seats	+/–
Free traders	60,658	57.33	140	+4
Protectionists	45,149	42.67	88	+3
Total	105,807	100.00	228	+7
Registered voters/turnout	288,096	–		
Source: Mackie & Rose
