= 1878 Swedish general election =

General elections were held in Sweden in 1878 to elect the Second Chamber of the Riksdag for a three-year term. Following the elections, the Lantmanna Party remained the largest party, holding 92 of the 204 seats.

Direct elections were held in 21 of the 24 urban constituencies and 73 of the 140 rural constituencies, an increase of four constituencies using direct elections. In the other 70 constituencies, the elections were indirect and carried out using electors.

Of a total population of 4.5 million, only 270,337 people (6%) were eligible to vote.

== Results ==
Party	Votes	%	Seats	+/–
Lantmanna Party			92	0
Centre Party			34	+4
Independents			78	+2
Total			204	+6
Total votes	54,821	–		
Registered voters/turnout	270,337	20.28		
Source: Norberg et al. Nohlen & Stöver
