= 1866 Swedish general election =

General elections were held in Sweden in 1866. They were the first elections for the new Second Chamber (Andra kammaren) in the Riksdag, which would serve a three-year term. Suffrage was given to men over the age of 21 who either had a taxable income of at least 800 riksdaler a year, owned a property worth at least 1,000 riksdaler, or rented a property taxed to at least 6,000 riksdaler. This meant that around 5.5% of the population were able to vote, a slight reduction from the 6% that had been eligible under the previous Estates system. The changes had been approved following a 60,000-strong petition and a vote in the House of Nobility in December 1865 during which crowds had gathered outside to pressure the nobles into approving it.

The 190 seats consisted of one representative from every Domsaga (or two for Domsaga with a population exceeding 40,000) and one representative for every 10,000 residents of a town (with smaller towns merged into combined constituencies). Candidates were required to be at least 25 years old.

Around 187,000 voters qualified by real estate, 9,500 through their rental arrangements and 10,500 through their income. Many property owners were farmers, giving the rural Lantmanna Party a dominant position in the second chamber.

The other house in the Riksdag, the 125-seat First Chamber, was dominated by the upper classes, with membership restricted to the 6,000 wealthiest people in the country, less than 1% of the population.

== Results ==
Of the 190 elected members, 107 had previously served in the Estates.

| Party | Seats |
|---|---|
| Lantmanna Party | 81 |
| Ministerial Party | 38 |
| Independents | 71 |
| Total | 190 |
Source: Norberg et al.
