= 1869 Swedish general election =

Past General election in Sweden

General elections were held in Sweden in 1869 to elect the Second Chamber of the Riksdag for a three-year term. In urban areas the elections were direct, whilst in some rural areas the vote was indirect, using electors.

== Electoral system ==
Suffrage was given to men over the age of 21 who either had a taxable income of at least 800 riksdaler a year, owned a property worth at least 1,000 riksdaler, or rented a property taxed to at least 6,000 riksdaler.

The Second Chamber had one representative from every Domsaga (or two for Domsaga with a population over 40,000) and one representative for every 10,000 residents of a town (with smaller towns merged into combined constituencies). Candidates were required to be at least 25 years old.
