= March–April 1887 Swedish general election =

- March-April 1887

Early general elections were held in Sweden in March and April 1887, having not been due until the autumn. They had been called following a debate over rye tariffs, and became known as the "tariff election".

== Background ==
Tariffs had become a major political issue in Sweden during the mid-1880s. In 1885 a campaign for tariffs to be introduced on grain was rejected by both chambers of the Riksdag. The following year the issue was debated again, and whilst the Second Chamber approved their introduction, the First Chamber rejected them. The matter was settled when a joint sitting of the two chambers rejected the initiative.

In 1887 a tariff on rye was voted down 70–68 in the First Chamber, which went on to vote down all other tariffs. The Second Chamber then approved the rye tariff by 111–101. With it looking as if the tariff proposal would be passed at a joint sitting, King Oscar II dissolved Parliament with the support of Prime Minister Robert Themptander, and called fresh elections.

== Results ==
An intensive election campaign led to a large increase in voter turnout; since the changes to the electoral system in 1866 turnout had always been below 25%, but for this election it was 48%. Only 21.9% of the male population aged over 21 was eligible to vote.

Party	Votes	%	Seats
Free traders	76,025	58.61	102
Protectionists	53,692	41.39	112
Total	129,717	100.00	214
Registered voters/turnout	274,733	–	
Source: Mackie & Rose

== Aftermath ==
Following the spring elections, some MPs attempted to delay a decision on tariffs by proposing that a commission of inquiry be set up. Although this was supported by Themptander, Parliament rejected the idea.

Despite the Spring elections, the scheduled August and September elections still went ahead, resulting in another victory for the free trade bloc, albeit with a reduced majority.
