= 1893 Swedish general election =

- September 1893

General elections were held in Sweden in September 1893. Protectionist candidates received a plurality of the vote. Erik Gustaf Boström remained Prime Minister.

== Campaign ==
The Liberals and the Swedish Social Democratic Party ran joint lists in some constituencies.

== Results ==
Only 24% of the male population aged over 21 was eligible to vote. Voter turnout was 42%.

Party	Votes	%	Seats	+/–
Protectionists	48,963	38.67	86	–2
Liberals	44,618	35.24	76	New
Swedish Social Democratic Party	44,618	35.24	0	0
Moderate Free Traders	33,036	26.09	66	New
Total	126,617	100.00	228	0
Registered voters/turnout	298,810	–		
Source: Mackie & Rose
