= Rosendal Castle =

Castle in Scania, Sweden

- Rosendals slott
- Helsingborg Municipality
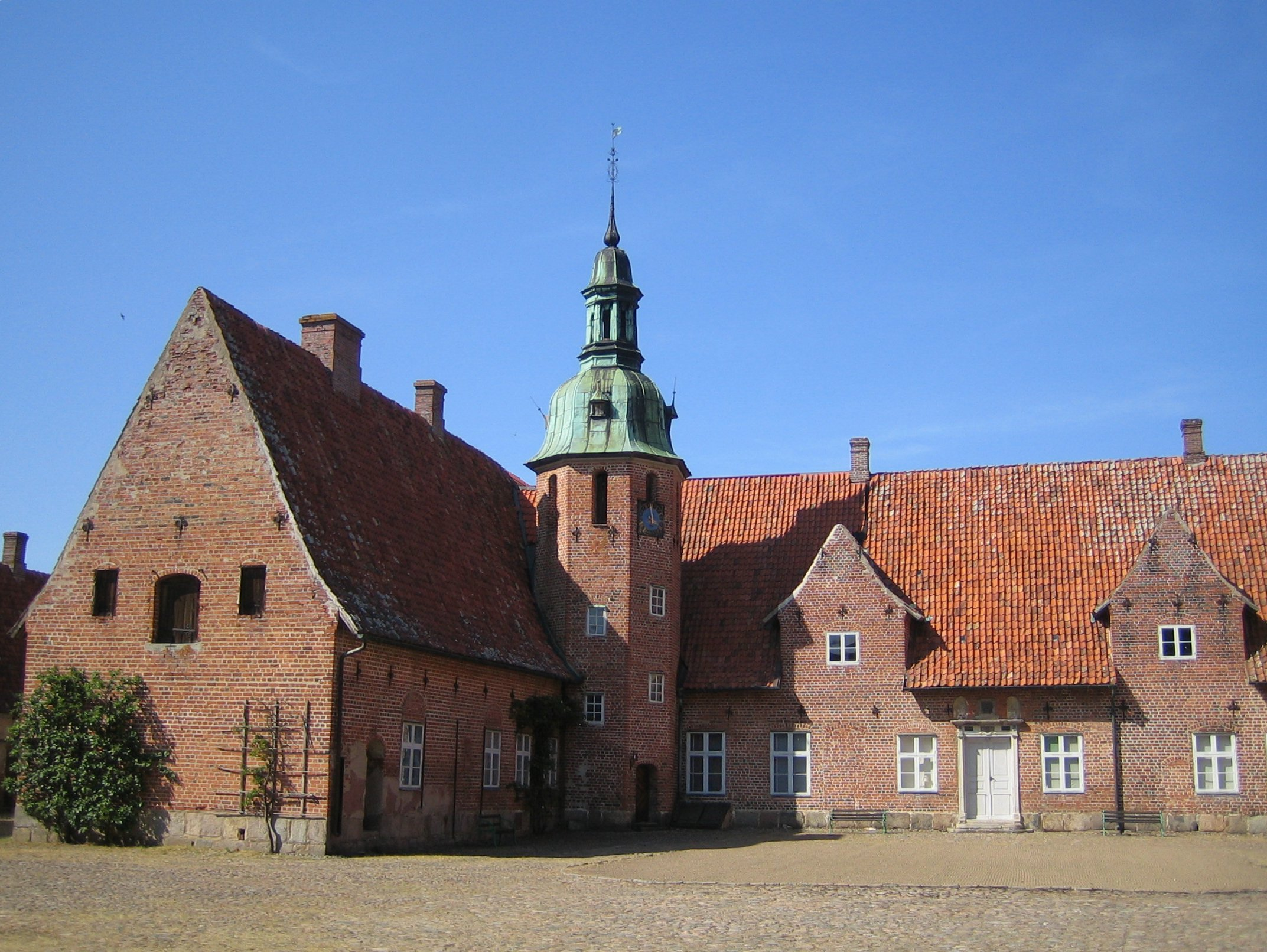
- Rosendal Castle

Site information
- Type: Castle
- Open to the public: No

Location
- Scania, Sweden
- Location within Skåne
- Coordinates: 56.090143°N 12.829667°E

Site history
- Built: 1615

Rosendal Castle (Swedish: Rosendals slott) is in Helsingborg Municipality, Scania, Sweden. Construction was started in 1615 during the ownership of Anders Stensson Bille på Råbelöv (1578-1633) who was Riksråd and sheriff at Helsingborg.

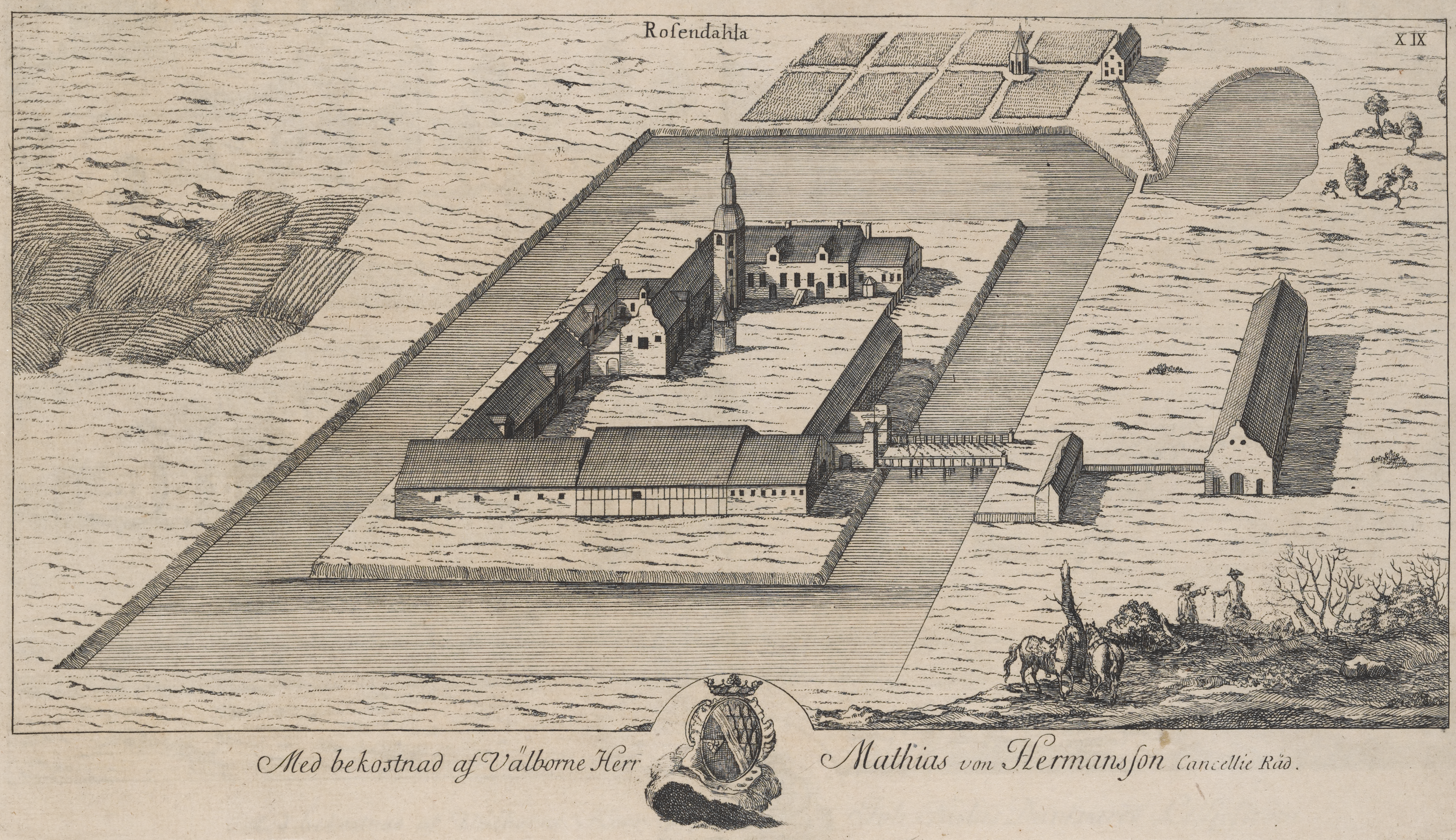
Core estate 1680 Rosendal Castle.

The central estate area is shown moated with core agricultural buildings as well as outlying acreage as at 1680 in an engraving of the mid 18th century.

== See also ==
- List of castles in Sweden
