= August–September 1887 Swedish general election =

- August-September 1887

General elections were held in Sweden in August and September 1887. Although they resulted in a victory for the pro-free trade bloc, 22 of its members were later expelled from parliament, giving the protectionist members a majority.

== Background ==
Tariffs had become a major political issue in Sweden during the mid-1880s. In 1885 a campaign for tariffs to be introduced on grain was rejected by both chambers of the Riksdag. The following year the issue was debated again, and whilst the Second Chamber approved their introduction, the First Chamber rejected them. The matter was settled when a joint sitting of the two chambers rejected the initiative.

In 1887 a tariff on rye was voted down 70–68 in the First Chamber, which went on to vote down all other tariffs. The Second Chamber then approved the rye tariff by 111–101. With it looking as if the tariff proposal would be passed at a joint sitting, King Oscar II dissolved Parliament with the support of Prime Minister Robert Themptander, and called fresh elections. The early elections in March and April had resulted in a majority for the pro-free trade bloc. Following the spring elections, some MPs attempted to delay a decision on tariffs by proposing that a commission of inquiry be set up. Although this was supported by Themptander, Parliament rejected the idea.

Despite the early elections, the scheduled August and September elections still went ahead.

== Results ==
Only 22% of the male population aged over 21 was eligible to vote, and the turnout of 36% was far lower than the 48% for the spring elections.

Party	Votes	%	Seats	+/–
Free traders	50,959	53.15	136	+34
Protectionists	44,915	46.85	85	–27
Total	95,874	100.00	221	+7
Registered voters/turnout	278,039	–		
Source: Mackie & Rose

== Aftermath ==
Following the elections Olof Larsson, a pro-free trade MP from Stockholm, was discovered to owe 11 kronor and 58 öre in unpaid municipal taxes. This was in violation of the Parliament Act, and as a result disqualified Larsson and all others elected on the same list as him. This amounted to a total of 22 pro-free trade MPs, all of whom were expelled from Parliament and replaced by protectionist MPs, who now had a majority in both chambers.

As a result, the pro-free trade government resigned despite attempts by King Oscar II to persuade ministers not to. A new pro-tariff government was formed, and implemented tariffs on a wide range of goods.
