= 1902 Swedish general election =

- September 1902

General elections were held in Sweden in September 1902. The Free-minded National Association emerged as the largest party in the Riksdag, winning 107 of the 230 seats.

== Results ==
Only 28% of the male population aged over 21 was eligible to vote. Voter turnout was 47%.

Party	Votes	%	Seats	+/–
Free-minded National Association	92,503	51.24	107	+15
Lantmanna Party	81,703	45.26	119	–18
Swedish Social Democratic Party	6,321	3.50	4	+3
Total	180,527	100.00	230	0
Registered voters/turnout	382,075	–		
Source: Mackie & Rose
