= 1908 Swedish general election =

- September 1908

All 230 seats in the Andra kammaren
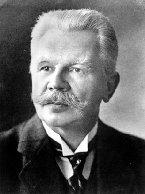

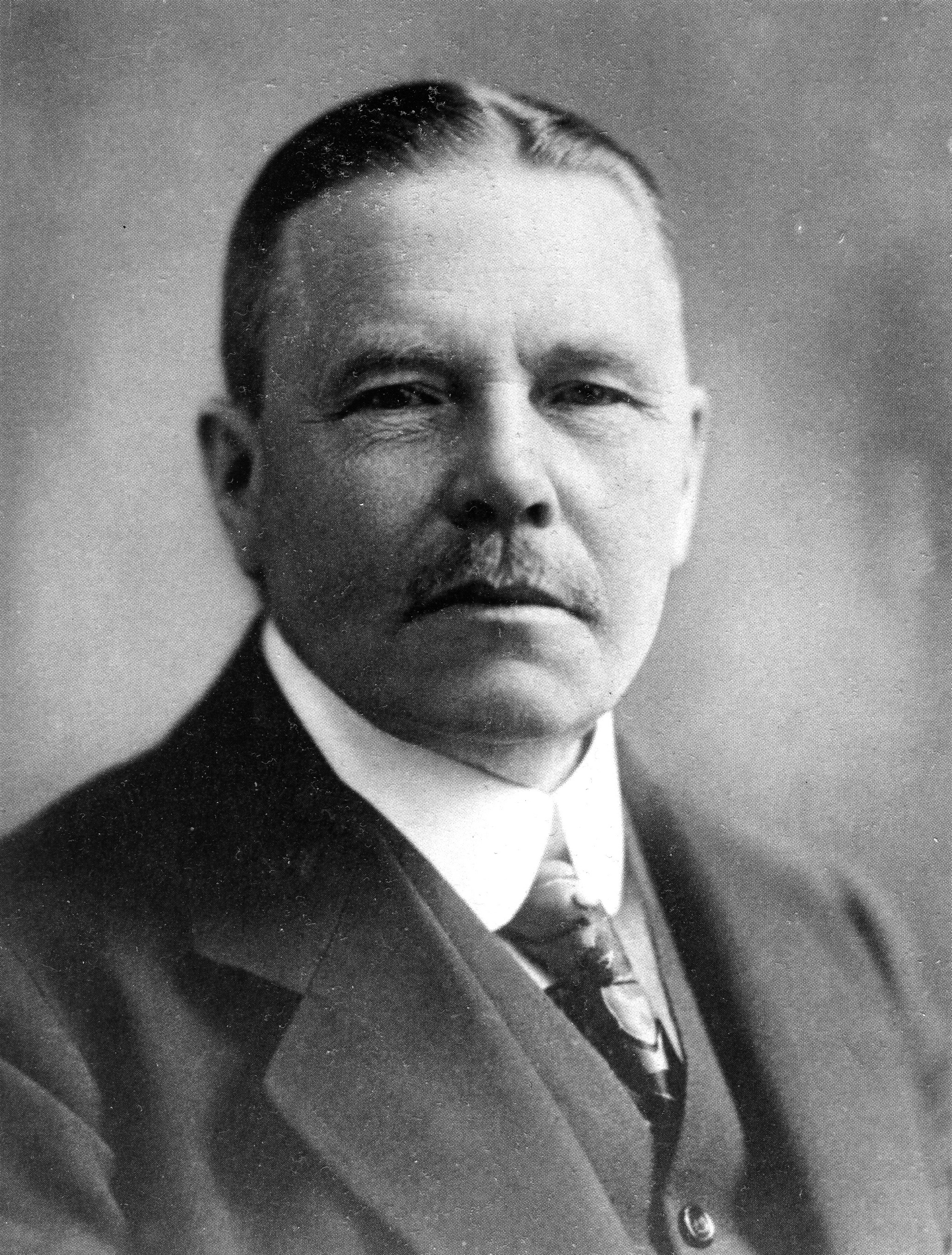

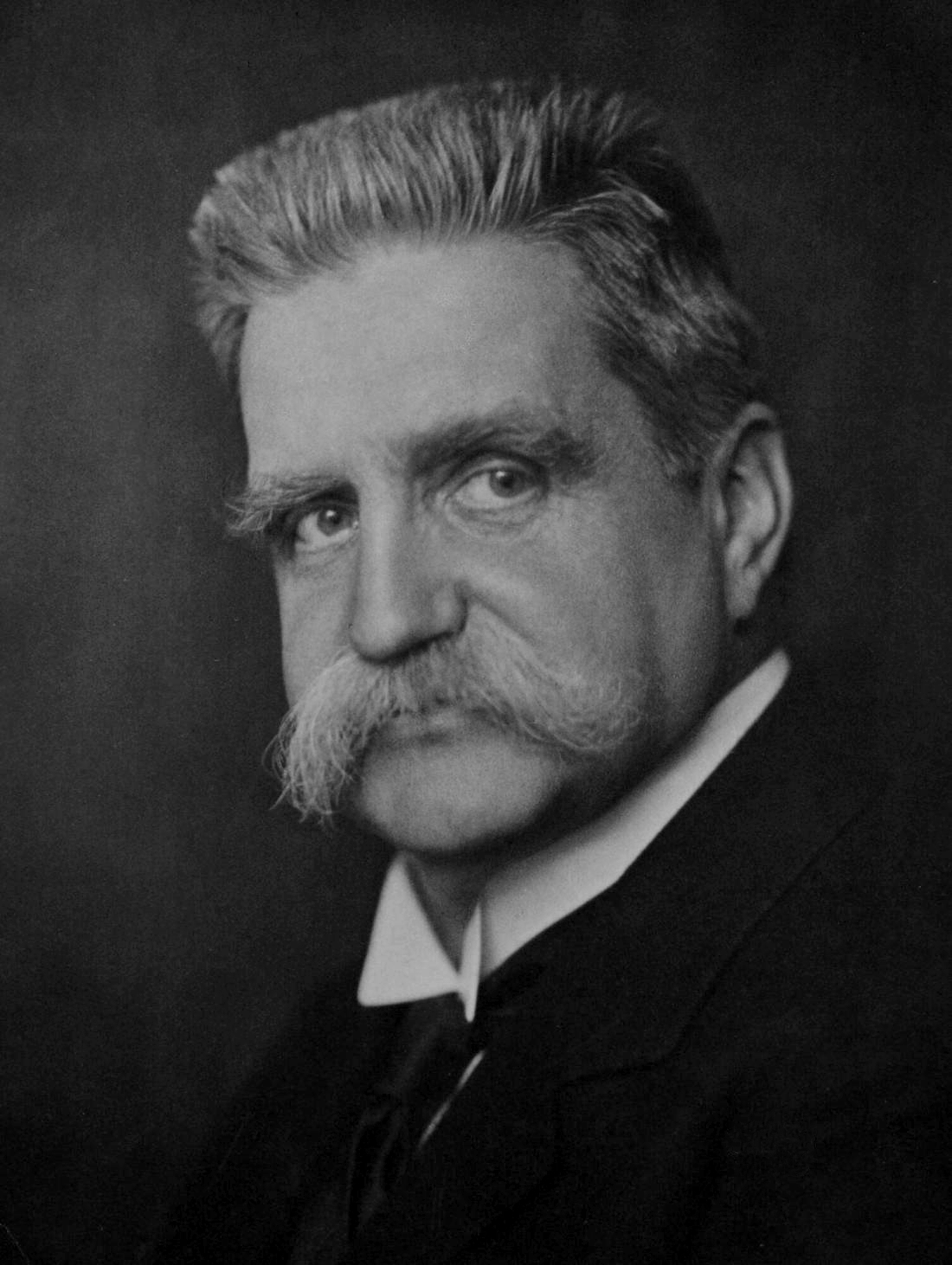
	First party	Second party	Third party
Leader	Karl Staaff	Arvid Lindman	Hjalmar Branting
Party	Free-minded	Electoral League	Social Democrats
Seats won	105	91	34
Popular vote	144,426	118,808	45,155
Percentage	46.83%	38.53	14.64%
PM before election
Arvid Lindman
Electoral League
PM-elect
Arvid Lindman
Electoral League

General elections were held in Sweden in September 1908. They were the first general elections in Sweden held using proportional representation.

Although it lost four seats, the Free-minded National Association remained the largest party in the Riksdag, winning 105 of the 230 seats. Right-winger Arvid Lindman stayed on as prime minister.

== Results ==
Only 35% of the male population aged over 21 was eligible to vote. Voter turnout was 61%, the highest since Riksdag elections began in 1866.

Party	Votes	%	Seats	+/–
Free-minded National Association	144,426	46.83	105	–4
General Electoral League	118,808	38.53	91	–17
Swedish Social Democratic Party	45,155	14.64	34	+21
Total	308,389	100.00	230	0
Registered voters/turnout	503,128	–		
Source: Mackie & Rose
