= 1881 Swedish general election =

General elections were held in Sweden in 1881 to elect the Second Chamber of the Riksdag for a three-year term. Following the elections, the Lantmanna Party remained the largest party, holding 101 of the 206 seats.

Direct elections were held in all 24 urban constituencies and 78 of the 142 rural constituencies, an increase of six constituencies using direct elections. In the other 64 rural constituencies, the elections were indirect and carried out using electors.

Of a total population of 4.6 million, only 281,193 people (6%) were eligible to vote.

== Results ==
Party	Votes	%	Seats	+/–
Lantmanna Party			101	+9
Centre Party			25	–9
Independents			80	+2
Total			206	+2
Total votes	66,591	–		
Registered voters/turnout	281,163	23.68		
Source: Norberg et al. Nohlen & Stöver
