= 1875 Swedish general election =

General elections were held in Sweden in 1875 to elect the Second Chamber of the Riksdag for a three-year term. Following the elections, the Lantmanna Party remained the largest party, holding 92 of the 198 seats.

== Electoral system ==
Suffrage was given to men over the age of 21 who either had a taxable income of at least 800 krona a year, owned a property worth at least 1,000 krona, or rented a property taxed to at least 6,000 krona. Of a total population of 4.4 million, only 255,552 people (6%) were eligible to vote.

The Second Chamber had one representative from every Domsaga (or two for Domsaga with a population over 40,000) and one representative for every 10,000 residents of a town (with smaller towns merged into combined constituencies). Candidates were required to be at least 25 years old.

Direct elections were held in 23 of the 24 urban constituencies and 67 of the 138 rural constituencies, an increase of eight constituencies using direct elections. In the other 72 constituencies, the elections were indirect and carried out using electors.

== Results ==
Party	Votes	%	Seats	+/–
Lantmanna Party			92	+2
Centre Party			30	+9
Independents			76	–7
Total			198	+4
Total votes	49,765	–		
Registered voters/turnout	255,552	19.47		
Source: Norberg et al. Nohlen & Stöver
