= Robert Themptander =

Swedish politician (1844–1897)

His Excellency Robert Themptander
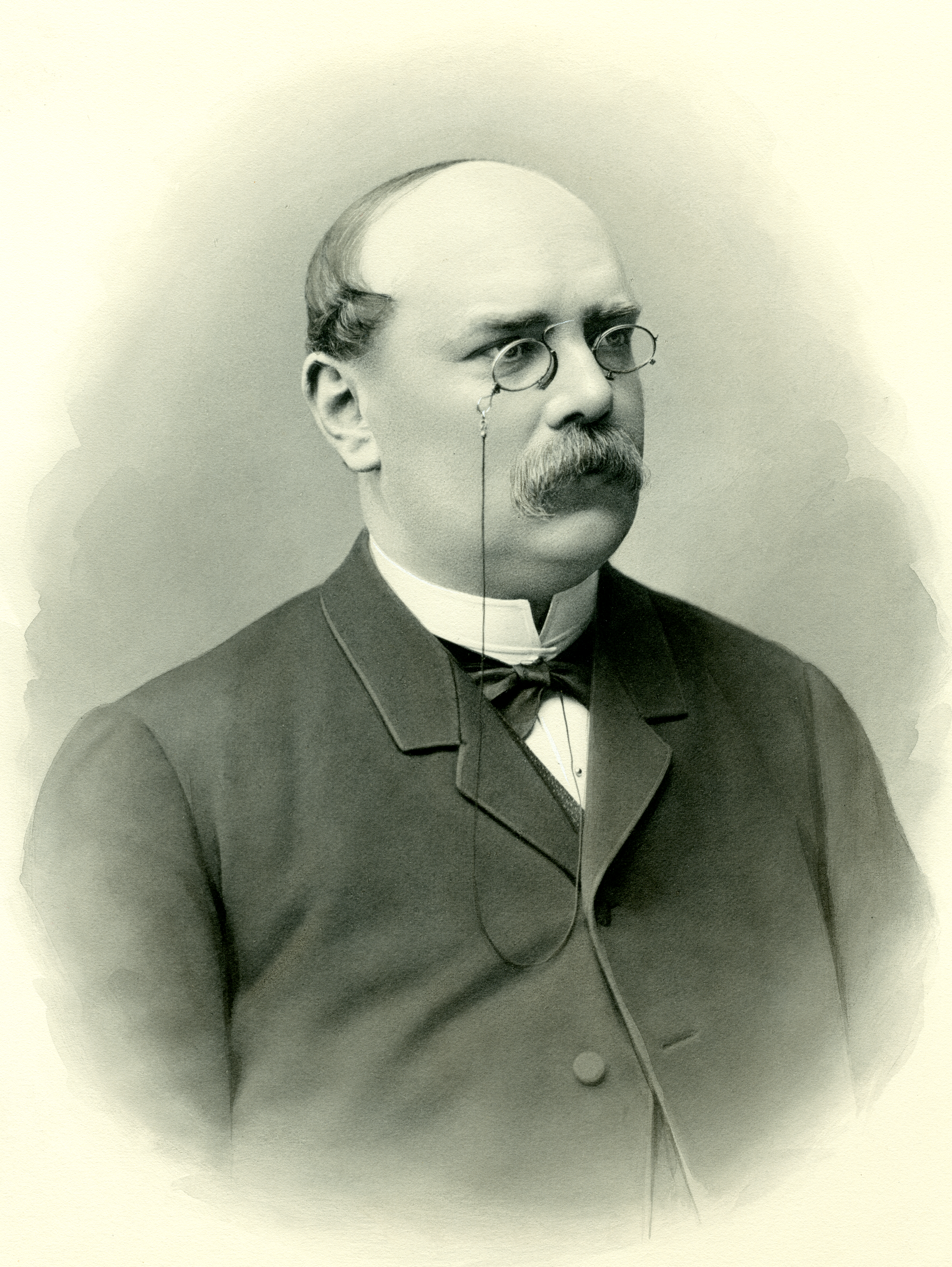
- Portrait of Themptander

Prime Minister of Sweden
- In office 16 May 1884 – 6 February 1888
- Monarch: Oscar II
- Preceded by: Carl Johan Thyselius
- Succeeded by: Gillis Bildt

Personal details
- Born: Oscar Robert Themptander; 14 February 1844 Stockholm, Sweden
- Died: 30 January 1897 (aged 52) Stockholm, Sweden
- Party: Independent liberal
- Spouse: Frida Dahlberg
- Education: Uppsala University

Oscar Robert Themptander (14 February 1844 – 30 January 1897) was a Swedish politician and public official who was Prime Minister of Sweden from 1884 to 1888 during the reign of King Oscar II, and Governor of Stockholm County from 1888 to 1896. He was also minister for finance.

At the age of 40 years and 92 days, Themptander is the youngest person to become Prime Minister in Swedish history. His death at the age of 52 years and 351 days makes him also the youngest prime minister at his death.

== Biography ==
Robert Themptander was born in Stockholm, the son of army lieutenant Nils Themptander and wife Adolphina Laurent. After law studies in Uppsala and a highly successful career in the civil service he became in 1879 a member of the Second Chamber. There from the beginning he was a member of the centre party, a party loyal to then incumbent government. Gradually he began move orientate towards the Lantmanna Party. He married in 1874 with Frida Dahlberg, with whom he had three children. In the government of Arvid Posse in 1880, he became minister without portfolio and, in 1881 minister for finance. He stayed on in this office in three years before he became Prime Minister at the age of 40.

Through good contacts in different parliamentary positions he was successful in breaking the political gridlock concerning the defense question. This issue was finally achieved in the year of 1885. He was less successful in his goal to protect the free trade system which Louis De Geer and Minister of Finance Johan August Gripenstedt had instituted during their time in office. This political economy had with many good benefits contributed to the modernization of Sweden. As food prices on the world markets sank because of increased imports from all of North America, demand increased for high tariffs to protect Swedish interests.

Eventually Themptander was constrained to retire, yet not through defeat in the 1887 election, when his resistance towards the new duty-friendly winds of opinion meant more election debate than before. Riksdag candidates were compelled to answer about which views they had, if they were Free Traders or Protectionists. This was seen by many at the time as uncommon. Lifelong members of the Riksdag had previously been elected on the basis of their high personal reputation and confidence. The Free Traders won in Stockholm and gained twenty-two parliamentary seats. But it appeared that one member had not paid his taxes and therefore the whole list was declared invalid. Lifelong members of the Riksdag who were free trade supporters were replaced with tariff supporters. Therefore, the Second Chamber returned a protectionist majority.

Themptander attempted to have King Oscar II announce a new election, but the King denied the request. Then Themptander resigned as Prime Minister. From 1888 to 1896 he was Stockholm County Governor and afterwards director for Trafik AB Grängesberg–Oxelösund.

Themptander was a member of the men's association Sällskapet Idun.

Robert Themptander died on 30 January 1897 in Stockholm.

Political offices
Preceded by Carl Johan Thyselius	Prime Minister of Sweden; 16 May 1884–6 February 1888	Succeeded by Gillis Bildt
