= 1884 Swedish general election =

General elections were held in Sweden in 1884 to elect the Second Chamber of the Riksdag for a three-year term.

Of a total population of 4.7 million, only 291,668 people (6%) were eligible to vote. Only 73,636 voters participated in the election.
