= Erik Gustaf Boström =

Swedish landowner and politician

His Excellency Erik Gustaf Boström
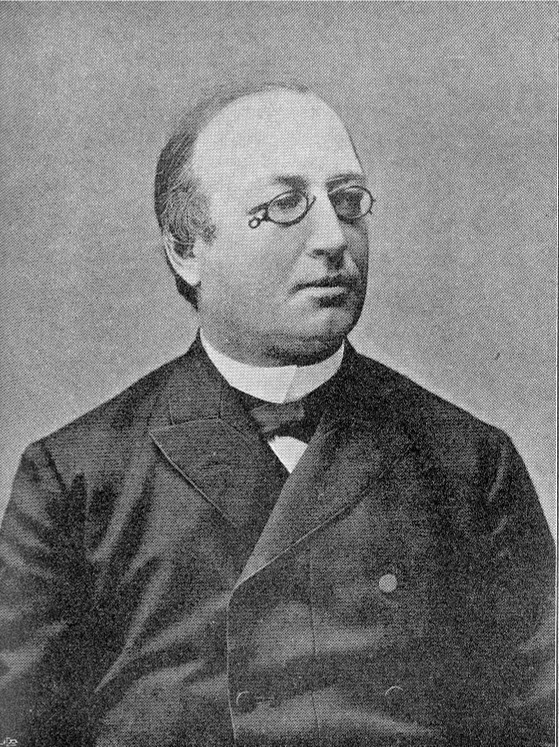

Prime Minister of Sweden
- In office 10 July 1891 – 12 September 1900
- Monarch: Oscar II
- Preceded by: Gustaf Åkerhielm
- Succeeded by: Fredrik von Otter
- In office 5 July 1902 – 13 April 1905
- Monarch: Oscar II
- Preceded by: Fredrik von Otter
- Succeeded by: Johan Ramstedt

Personal details
- Born: Erik Gustaf Bernhard Boström; 11 February 1842 Stockholm, Sweden
- Died: 21 February 1907 (aged 65) Stockholm, Sweden
- Party: Lantmanna Party
- Education: Uppsala University

Erik Gustaf Bernhard Boström (11 February 1842 – 21 February 1907) was a Swedish conservative statesman and estate owner who served twice as Prime Minister of Sweden from 1891 to 1900 and from 1902 to 1905. Affiliated with the Lantmanna Party, he was a member of the Riksdag from 1876 until his death in 1907, first of the lower house from 1876 to 1893, and then of the upper house from 1894 to 1907. With a total of nearly 13 years in office, he was Sweden’s longest-serving head of government during the 19th century.

In 1871, he married Carolina "Lina" Almqvist, with whom he had six daughters and one son. He was the brother of Filip Boström, governor of Södermanland between 1887 and 1908, and of Ebba Boström, and the nephew of the philosopher Christopher Jacob Boström.

Boström's governmental policy was marked by its pragmatism. Over time, Boström gained a good reputation as being a rallying national icon despite being the first prime minister to have neither an academic education nor experience with upper governmental positions. He was also quite popular with King Oscar II. Boström's eventual downfall was caused by his refusal to budge on the issue of Norway.

== Childhood and career ==
Erik Gustaf Boström was born in Stockholm, the son of Eric Samuel Boström, chief judge of the district court and his wife Elisabet Gustava Fredenheim. The family was one branch of the Laestadius family of priests from Norrland. His paternal grandfather Christopher Laestander, a townsman and ship carpenter in the city of Piteå, took the surname Boström.

He was tutored by Kristian Claëson, whose first cousin served as the Minister of Ecclesiastical Affairs under Boström in 1898. In 1854, he became a student at the Uppsala Cathedral School, which was also the year his father died. Five of his fellow cabinet members during his first term attended the same school: Axel Rappe, Edvard von Krusenstjerna, Ludvig Annerstedt, Gustaf Gilljam and Lars Åkerhielm. In 1861, he transferred to Uppsala University, where he studied until 1863 when his mother died and he had to take over her manor at Östanå Castle.

As a youth he availed himself of the opportunity to pay to avoid conscription, which was last possible in 1872.

Boström was quite successful as a farmer and he started to get involved in local politics. In January 1870, he became a member of the executive committee of the Agricultural Society of Stockholm County and of the county council of Stockholm County, where he also served as vice-chairperson and chairperson for many years. In 1871, he married Carolina Almqvist, daughter of Justice Councillor and Minister Ludvig Almqvist. In 1875, he was elected to the lower house of parliament to represent the judicial district of Södra Roslagen. In parliament, he joined the Lantmanna Party and quickly positioned himself as a leading protectionist, supporting tariff protection, in the Committee of Ways and Means and of Committee on Banking. In addition, he was interested in a strong defence, which he considered to have manifested itself as a strong marine defence, and a strong opposition to the abolition of the Swedish allotment system.

== Chancellor of the Swedish Universities 1905–1907 ==
After he retired from his position as Prime Minister, Boström became the Chancellor of the Swedish Universities, where he tried unsuccessfully to prevent Bengt Lidforss from continuing on as associate professor at Lund University. He then tendered his resignation from his position as chancellor, although he quickly retracted it. Boström continued to be interested in politics and in a letter that he wrote to his dear old friend Carl Herslow on 4 June, he stated that it would be extremely desirable for the recently retired government to have been able to stay on. He also said in a letter that Karl Staaff's government could take of social policy better than a conservative government could and that Staaff occasionally appeared to possess the ability to accomplish a lot, although he chose a different way. Boström died in his home in Stockholm on 21 February 1907. A few days later, the bells pealed out over Stockholm to commemorate the former Prime Minister.

== Family ==
- One brother, County Governor of Södermanland County Filip Boström.
- Three sisters, including Ebba Boström
- Six daughters: Hedvig, Carolina Elisabeth, Sofia Lovisa, Clara Gustafva, Ingeborg Maria and Eva Margareta.
- One son: Chamberlain Gustaf Samuel Boström.
- Married to Carolina Almqvist, daughter of Councillor of Justice and Minister Ludvig Almqvist.

Political offices
| Preceded by Gustaf Åkerhielm | Prime Minister of Sweden; 1891–1900 | Succeeded by Fredrik von Otter |
| Preceded by Fredrik von Otter | Prime Minister of Sweden; 1902–1905 | Succeeded by Johan Ramstedt |
Non-profit organization positions
| New title | Chairman of the Nobel Foundation; 1900–1907 | Succeeded by Fredrik Wachtmeister |
