= Swedish Social Democratic Party =

Political party

Swedish Social Democratic Workers' Party Sveriges socialdemokratiska arbetareparti
- Abbreviation: S SAP
- Chairperson: Magdalena Andersson
- Secretary-General: Tobias Baudin
- Parliamentary group leader: Lena Hallengren
- Founded: 23 April 1889; 137 years ago
- Headquarters: Sveavägen 68, Stockholm
- Student wing: Social Democratic Students of Sweden
- Youth wing: Swedish Social Democratic Youth League
- Women's wing: Social Democratic Women in Sweden
- Religious wing: Religious Social Democrats of Sweden
- LGBT wing: LGBT Social Democrats of Sweden
- Membership (2025): ▲79,322
- Ideology: Social democracy
- Political position: Centre-left
- European affiliation: Party of European Socialists
- European Parliament group: Progressive Alliance of Socialists and Democrats
- International affiliation: Progressive Alliance
- Nordic affiliation: SAMAK; The Social Democratic Group
- Trade union affiliation: Swedish Trade Union Confederation
- Colours: Red
- Riksdag: 99 / 349
- European Parliament: 5 / 21
- County councils: 576 / 1,720 (33%)
- Municipal councils: 3,771 / 12,614 (30%)

Website
- socialdemokraterna.se

The Swedish Social Democratic Party, formally the Swedish Social Democratic Workers' Party (Swedish: Sveriges socialdemokratiska arbetareparti, (Note: Pronounced [ˈsvæ̌rjɛs sʊsɪˈɑ̂ːldɛmʊˌkrɑːtɪska ˈârːbeːtarɛpaˌʈiː].) S or SAP), commonly referred to as the Social Democrats (Socialdemokraterna (Note: Pronounced [sʊsɪˈɑ̂ːldɛmʊˌkrɑːtɛɳa].)), is a social democratic political party in Sweden. The party is a member of the Progressive Alliance and the Party of European Socialists.

Founded in 1889, the Social Democratic Party is the country's oldest and currently largest party. It has dominated the country's politics for the past century, being returned as the largest party in every election since September 1914. It led the government continuously from 1936 to 1976 and all but one term from 1982 to 2006. It is currently in opposition against the right-wing Kristersson cabinet after the left bloc narrowly lost the 2022 election. It participates in elections as "The Workers' Party – The Social Democrats" (Arbetarepartiet – Socialdemokraterna (Note: Pronounced [ˈârːbeːtarɛpaˌʈiːɛt sʊsɪˈɑ̂ːldɛmʊˌkrɑːtɛɳa].)). The first female PM in Swedish history, Magdalena Andersson, is the current leader of the Social Democratic Party.

== History ==
Founded in 1889 as a member of the Second International, a split occurred in 1917 when the left socialists split from the Social Democrats to form the Swedish Social Democratic Left Party (later the Communist Party of Sweden and now the Left Party). The words of honour as recorded by the 2001 party programme are "freedom, equality, and solidarity". The party had influences from Marxism in its early days, but these were gradually removed in the years leading up to the split in 1917. Between 1923 and 1940, the party was a member of the Labour and Socialist International.

Swedish social democracy rose due to the extension of suffrage to the working class and the organizing of trade unions and other civic associations. Unlike in many other European countries, the Swedish socialist left was able to form a stable majority coalition during the early 20th century. Early on, in large part due to the leadership of Hjalmar Branting, the Swedish socialists adopted a flexible and pragmatic understanding of Marxism. They were also willing to form cross-class coalitions with liberals and farmers. Political scientist Sheri Berman also credits the Swedish Social Democratic success during the interwar years to the party's adoption of Keynesianism during the Great Depression, which she contrasts with the Social Democratic Party of Germany's reluctance towards Keynesian policies and subsequent decline.

In 2007, the Social Democrats elected Mona Sahlin as their first female party leader. On 7 December 2009, the Social Democrats launched a political and electoral coalition with the Greens and the Left Party known as the Red–Greens. The parties contested the 2010 election on a joint manifesto, but lost the election to the incumbent centre-right coalition, The Alliance. On 26 November 2010, the Red–Green alliance was dissolved. The party is a member of the Progressive Alliance, the Party of European Socialists and SAMAK. The party was a member of the Socialist International until March 2017.

== Ideology, political impact and history ==
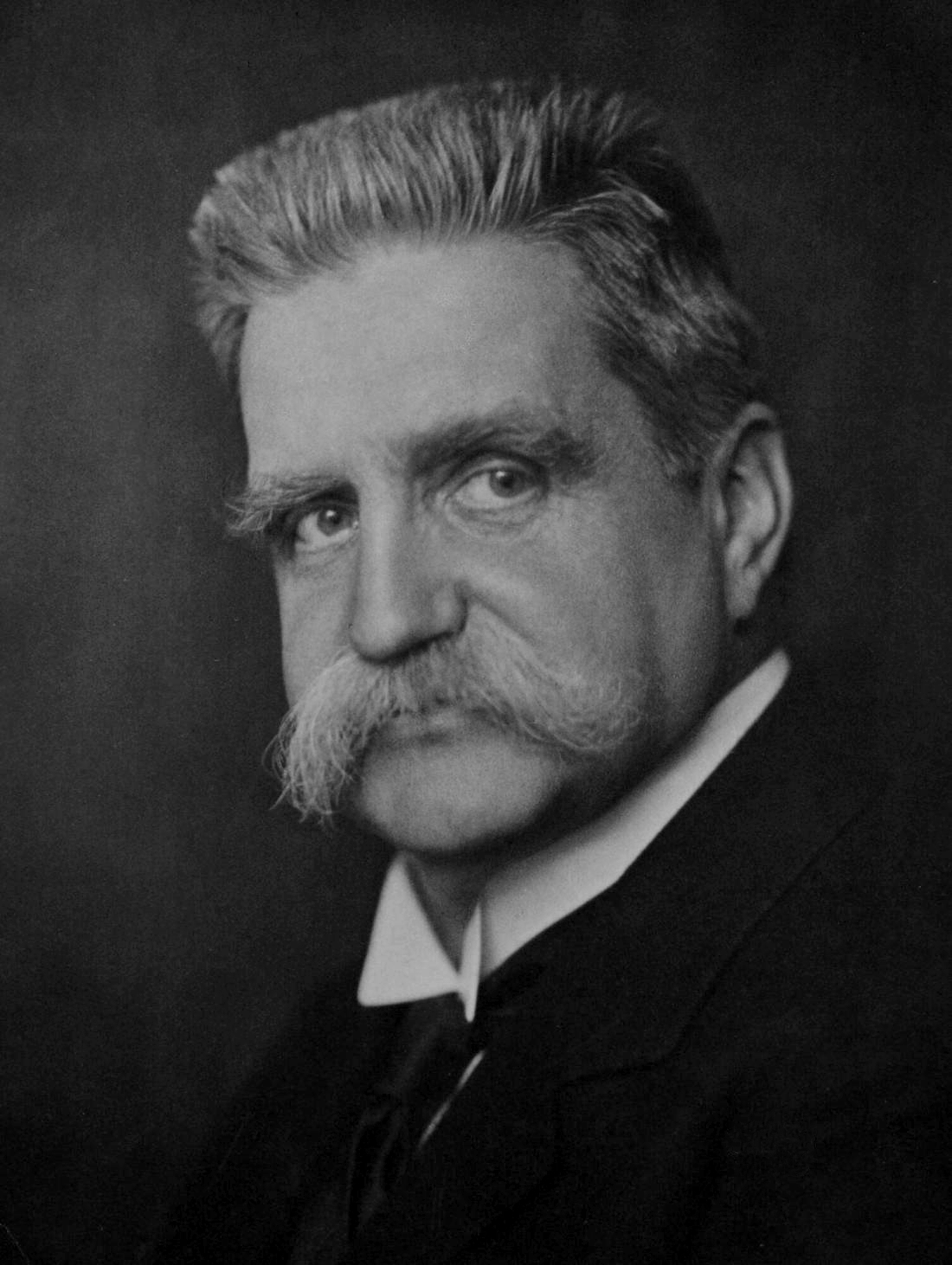
Hjalmar Branting, the first elected SAP Prime Minister in 1920

The party's first chapter in its statutes says "the intention of the Swedish Social Democratic Labour Party is the struggle towards Democratic Socialism", i.e. a society with a democratic economy based on the socialist principle "From each according to his ability, to each according to his need". Since the party held power of office for a majority of terms after its founding in 1889 through 2003, the ideology and policies of the SAP have had strong influence on Swedish politics. The Swedish social democratic ideology is partially an outgrowth of the strong and well-organized 1880s and 1890s working class emancipation, temperance and religious folkrörelser (folk movements), by which peasant and workers' organizations penetrated state structures early on and paved the way for electoral politics. In this way, Swedish social democratic ideology is inflected by a socialist tradition foregrounding widespread and individual human development.

In 1967, Gunnar Adler-Karlsson confidently likened the social democratic project to the successful social democratic effort to divest the king of all power but formal grandeur: "Without dangerous and disruptive internal fights. ... After a few decades they [the capitalists] will then remain, perhaps formally as kings, but in reality as naked symbols of a passed and inferior development state."

The Social Democrats are strong supporters of egalitarianism and maintain a strong opposition to discrimination and racism. The party supports social welfare provision, paid for by progressive taxation. The party also supports a social corporatist economy involving the institutionalization of a social partnership system between capital and labour economic interest groups, with government oversight to resolve disputes between the two factions. Concerning constitutional issues, the Social Democrats advocate the abolition of monarchy.

=== Liberalism ===
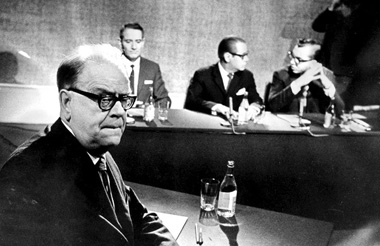
Prime Minister Tage Erlander at a TV debate in 1967

Liberalism has also strongly infused social democratic ideology. Liberalism has oriented social democratic goals to security. Tage Erlander, prime minister from 1946 to 1969, described security as "too big a problem for the individual to solve with only his own power". Up to the 1980s, when neoliberalism began to provide an alternative, aggressively pro-capitalist model for ensuring social quiescence, the SAP was able to secure capital's co-operation by convincing capital that it shared the goals of increasing economic growth and reducing social friction. For many Social Democrats, Marxism is loosely held to be valuable for its emphasis on changing the world for a more just, better future. In 1889, Hjalmar Branting, leader of the SAP from its founding to his death in 1925, asserted: "I believe that one benefits the workers so much more by forcing through reforms which alleviate and strengthen their position, than by saying that only a revolution can help them".

Some observers have argued that this liberal aspect has hardened into increasingly neoliberal ideology and policies, gradually maximizing the latitude of powerful market actors. Certainly, neoclassical economists have been firmly nudging the Social Democratic Party into capitulating to most of capital's traditional preferences and prerogatives which they term "modern industrial relations". Both socialist and liberal aspects of the party were influenced by the dual sympathies of early leader Hjalmar Branting and manifest in the party's first actions, namely reducing the work day to eight hours and establishing the franchise for working-class people.

While some commentators have seen the party lose focus with the rise of SAP neoliberal study groups, the Swedish Social Democratic Party has for many years appealed to Swedes as innovative, capable and worthy of running the state. The Social Democrats became one of the most successful political parties in the world, with some structural advantages in addition to their auspicious birth within vibrant folkrörelser. At the close of the 19th century, liberals and socialists had to band together to augment establishment democracy which was at that point embarrassingly behind in Sweden and they could point to formal democratic advances elsewhere to motivate political action. In addition to being small, Sweden was a semi-peripheral country at the beginning of the 20th century, considered unimportant to competing global political factions, so it was permitted more independence while soon the existence of communist and capitalist superpowers allowed social democracy to flourish in the geo-political interstices. The SAP has the resource of sharing ideas and experiences and working with its sister parties throughout the Nordic countries. Sweden could also borrow and innovate upon ideas from English-language economists which was an advantage for the Social Democrats in the Great Depression, but more advantageous for the bourgeois parties in the 1980s and afterward.

=== Revisionism ===
Among the social movement tactics of the Swedish Social Democratic Party in the 20th century was its redefinition of "socialization" from "common ownership of the means of production" to increasing "democratic influence over the economy". Starting out in a socialist-liberal coalition fighting for the vote, the Swedish Social Democrats defined socialism as the development of democracy—political and economic. On that basis, they could form coalitions, innovate and govern where other European social democratic parties became crippled and crumbled under right-wing regimes. The Swedish Social Democrats could count the middle class among their solidaristic working class constituency by recognizing the middle class as "economically dependent", "working people", or among the "progressive citizens", rather than as sub-capitalists. The Social Democratic congress of 1932 established that "[t]he party does not aim to support and help [one] working class at the expense of the others". In fact, with social democratic policies that refrained from supporting inefficient and low-profit businesses in favor of cultivating higher-quality working conditions as well as a strong commitment to public education, the middle class in Sweden became so large that the capitalist class has remained concentrated. Not only did the SAP fuse the growing middle class into their constituency, they also ingeniously forged periodic coalitions with small-scale farmers (as members of the "exploited classes") to great strategic effect. The SAP version of socialist ideology allowed them to maintain a prescient view of the working class. The party's 1932 election manifesto asserted that "[the SAP] does not question whether those who have become capitalism's victims are industrial workers, farmers, agricultural laborers, forestry workers, store clerks, civil servants or intellectuals".

While the SAP has worked more or less constructively with more radical left-wing parties in Sweden, the Social Democrats have borrowed from socialists some of their discourse and decreasingly the socialist understanding of the structurally compromised position of labor under capitalism. Even more creatively, the Social Democrats commandeered selected, transcendental images from such nationalists as Rudolf Kjellen in 1912, very effectively undercutting fascism's appeal in Sweden. In this way, Per Albin Hansson declared that "there is no more patriotic party than the [SAP since] the most patriotic act is to create a land in which all feel at home", famously igniting Swedes' innermost longing for transcendence with the 1928 idea of the Folkhem, or the People's Home. The Social Democratic Party promoted Folkhemmet as a socialist home at a point in which the party turned its back on class struggle and the policy tool of nationalization. Hansson soothed that "[t]he expansion of the party to a people's party does not mean and must not mean a watering down of socialist demands". He further stated:

The basis of the home is community and togetherness. The good home does not recognize any privileged or neglected members, nor any favorite or stepchildren. In the good home there is equality, consideration, co-operation, and helpfulness. Applied to the great people's and citizens' home this would mean the breaking down of all the social and economic barriers that now separate citizens into the privileged and the neglected, into the rulers and the dependents, into the rich and the poor, the propertied and the impoverished, the plunderers and the plundered. Swedish society is not yet the people's home. There is a formal equality, equality of political rights, but from a social perspective, the class society remains, and from an economic perspective the dictatorship of the few prevails.

=== Social democracy ===
The Social Democratic Party is generally recognized as the main architect of the progressive taxation, fair trade, low-unemployment, active labor market policies (ALMP)-based Swedish welfare state that was developed in the years after World War II. Sweden emerged sound from the Great Depression with a brief, successful "Keynesianism-before Keynes" economic program advocated by Ernst Wigforss, a prominent Social Democrat who educated himself in economics by studying the work of the British radical Liberal economists. The social democratic labor market policies, or ALMPs, were developed in the 1940s and 1950s by LO (Landsorganisationen i Sverige, the blue-collar union federation) economists Gösta Rehn and Rudolf Meidner. The Rehn-Meidner model featured the centralized system of wage bargaining that aimed to both set wages at a just level and promote business efficiency and productivity. With the pre-1983 cooperation of capital and labor federations that bargained independently of the state, the state determined that wages would be higher than the market would set in firms that were inefficient or uncompetitive and lower than the market would set in firms that were highly productive and competitive. Workers were compensated with state-sponsored retraining and relocating. At the same time, the state reformed wages to the goal of "equal pay for equal work", eliminated unemployment, also known as ("the reserve army of labor") as a disciplinary device and kept incomes consistently rising while taxing progressively and pooling social wealth to deliver services through local governments. Social Democratic policy has traditionally emphasized a state spending structure, whereby public services are supplied via local government as opposed to emphasizing social insurance program transfers.

These social democratic policies have had international influence. The early Swedish red–green coalition encouraged Nordic-networked socialists in the state of Minnesota to dedicate efforts to building a similarly potent labor-farmer alliance that put the socialists in the governorship, running statewide model innovative anti-racism programs in the early years of the 20th century and enabled federal forest managers in the state of Minnesota to practice a precocious ecological-socialism before U.S. Democratic Party reformers appropriated the Minnesota Farmer-Labor Party infrastructure to the liberal Democratic Party in 1944.

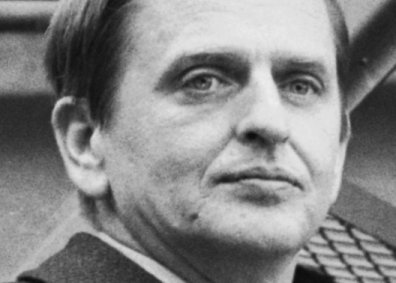
Social Democratic leader and Prime Minister Olof Palme in the 1970s

Logo of the party between 1967 and 1987

Under the Social Democrats' administration, Sweden retained neutrality as a foreign policy guideline during the wars of the 20th century, including the Cold War. Neutrality preserved the Swedish economy and boosted Sweden's economic competitiveness in the first half of the 20th century as other European countries' economies were devastated by war. Under Olof Palme's Social Democratic leadership, Sweden further aggravated the hostility of United States’ political conservatives when Palme openly denounced the American aggression in Vietnam. President Richard Nixon suspended diplomatic ties with the social democratic country, because of its denouncement of the war. In 2003, top-ranking Social Democratic Party politician Anna Lindh—who criticized the American-led invasion of Iraq as well as both Israeli and Palestinian atrocities and who was the lead figure in promoting the European Union in Sweden—was publicly assassinated in Stockholm. As Lindh was to succeed Göran Persson in the party leadership, her death was deeply disruptive to the party as well as to the campaign to promote the adoption of the EMU (euro) in Sweden. The neutrality policy has changed with the contemporary ascendance of the centre-right coalition as Sweden had committed troops to support the United States and United Kingdom's previous interventions in Afghanistan.

=== From Rehn–Meidner to neoliberalism ===
Because the Rehn–Meidner model allowed capitalists owning very productive and efficient firms to retain excess profits at the expense of the firms' workers, thus exacerbating inequality, workers in these companies began to ask for a share of the profits in the 1970s, just as women working in the state sector began to assert pressure for better wages. Meidner established a study committee that came up with a 1976 proposal that entailed transferring the excess profits into investment funds controlled by the workers in the firms, with the intention that the companies’ employment would increase and thus pay more workers higher wages, rather than increasing the wealth of the company owners and managers. Capitalists immediately distinguished this proposal as socialism, and launched an unprecedented opposition—including calling off the class compromise established in the 1938 Saltsjöbaden Agreement.

The 1980s were a very turbulent time in Sweden that initiated the occasional decline of Social Democratic Party rule. In the 1980s, pillars of Swedish industry were massively restructured. Shipbuilding was discontinued, wood pulp was integrated into modernized paper production, the steel industry was concentrated and specialized and mechanical engineering was digitalized. In 1986, Olof Palme, one of the Social Democratic Party's strongest champions of democracy and egalitarianism, was assassinated. Swedish capital was increasingly moving Swedish investment into other European countries as the European Union coalesced and a hegemonic consensus was forming among the elite financial community while progressive taxation and pro-egalitarian redistribution became economic heresy. A leading proponent of capital's cause at the time, Social Democrat Finance Minister Kjell-Olof Feldt reminisced in an interview: "The negative inheritance I received from my predecessor Gunnar Sträng (Minister of Finance, 1955–1976) was a strongly progressive tax system with high marginal taxes. This was supposed to bring about a just and equal society. But I eventually came to the opinion that it simply didn't work out that way. Progressive taxes created instead a society of wranglers, cheaters, peculiar manipulations, false ambitions and new injustices. It took me at least a decade to get a part of the party to see this". With the capitalist confederation's defection from the 1938 Saltsjöbaden Agreement and Swedish capital investing in other European countries rather than Sweden as well as the global rise of neoliberal political-economic hegemony, the Social Democratic Party backed away from the progressive Meidner reform.

The economic crisis in the 1990s has been widely cited in the Anglo-American press as a social democratic failure, but not only did profit rates begin to fall worldwide after the 1960s, this period also saw neoliberal ascendance in Social Democratic ideology and policies as well as the rise of bourgeois coalition rule in place of the Social Democrats. In the 1980s the Social Democratic party's neoliberal measures—such as depressing and deregulating the currency to prop up Swedish exports during the economic restructuring and transition, dropping of corporate taxation and taxation on high income-earners and switching from anti-unemployment policies to anti-inflationary policies—were exacerbated by the international recession, unchecked currency speculation and by a Moderate Party government led by Carl Bildt (1991–1994), creating the fiscal crisis of the early 1990s. According to Cerra and Saxena (2005) almost all of the fall in the substantial GDP per capita lead over the OECD average that Sweden enjoyed through the 1960–1990 period can be attributed to the Swedish financial crisis, and there is no evidence for a substantial negative growth impact from egalitarian policies as in the 'Eurosclerosis' hypothesis. The financial crisis can in turn be explained by policy errors. For example, in the late 1980s high inflation interacted with the tax code to produce negative real interest rates and an investment boom. However, in 1990–1991 the highly trade exposed Swedish economy was impacted by the global downturn, but the commitment to the fixed exchange rate now required a rapid shift to high real interest rates in order to defend the peg, collapsing asset markets and fixed investment. The household savings rate rose appreciably, exacerbated by fears of welfare state retrenchment, worsening the fall in aggregate demand. Unemployment rose rapidly, and the banking sector went into crisis as the nonperforming rate rose sharply, prompting a large bailout program. According to Cerra and Saxena, the deep recession had large and permanent negative effects on the Swedish GDP, which is consistent with other research suggesting that a financial crisis can have extremely persistent effects.

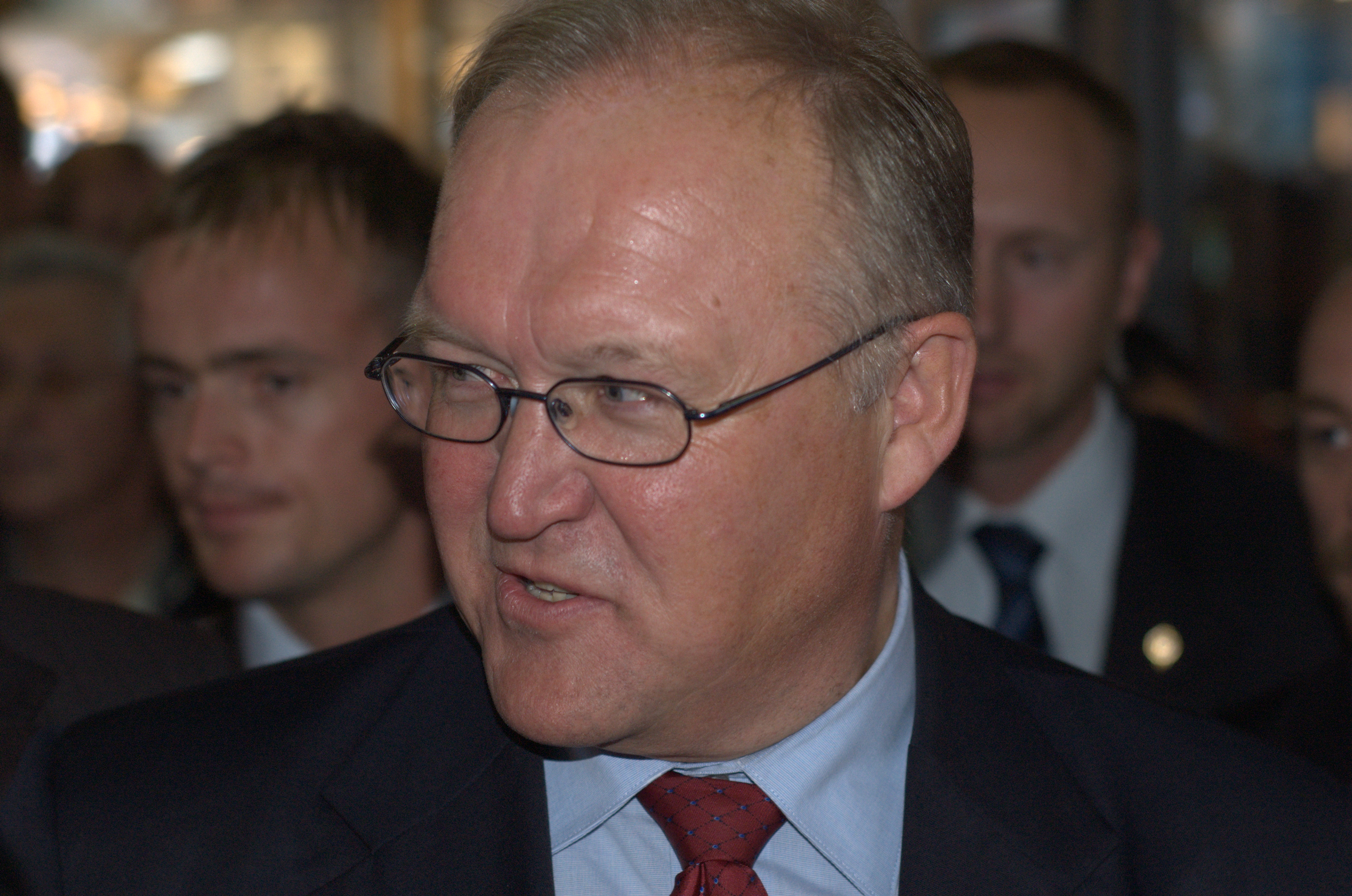
Göran Persson, a prolific Social Democratic leader, holding the office of Prime Minister for ten years

When the Social Democrats returned to power in 1994, they responded to the fiscal crisis by stabilizing the currency—and by curtailing the welfare state and privatizing the public sector and goods as governments did in many countries influenced by conservative Milton Friedman, the Chicago School of political and economic thought and the global neoliberal movement. Social Democratic Party leaders—including Göran Persson, Mona Sahlin and Anna Lindh—promoted European Union (EU) membership and the Swedish referendum passed by 52–48% in favor of joining the EU on 14 August 1994. Liberal leader Lars Leijonborg at his 2007 retirement could recall the 1990s as a golden age of liberalism in which the Social Democrats were under the expanding influence of the Liberals and its partners in the centre-right political coalition. Leijonborg recounted neoliberal victories such as the growth of private schooling and the proliferation of private, for-profit radio and television. It has been argued that the Swedish Social Democrats' Third Way pension reforms have been more successful than those enacted by the German Social Democrats.

=== 21st century ===
In the 21st century, many of the aspects of the social democratic welfare state continued to function at a high level, due in no small part to the high rate of unionization in Sweden, the independence of unions in the wage-setting and the exemplary competency of the female public sector workforce as well as widespread public support for welfare. The Social Democrats initiated studies on the effects of the neoliberal changes and the picture that emerged from those findings allowed the party to reduce many tax expenditures, slightly increase taxes on high income-earners and significantly reduce taxes on food. The Social Democratic Finance Minister increased spending on child support and continued to pay down the acquired public debt. By 1998, the Swedish macro-economy recovered from the 1980s industrial restructuring and the currency policy excesses. At the turn of the 21st century, Sweden had a well-regarded, generally robust economy and the average quality of life after government transfers was very high, inequality was low and the (Gini coefficient was .28) and social mobility was high (compared to the affluent Anglo-American and Central European countries).

The Social Democratic Party pursues environmentalist and feminist policies which promote healthful and humane conditions. Feminist policies formed and implemented by the Social Democratic Party along with the Green Party and the Left Party (which made an arrangement with the Social Democrats to support the government while not forming a coalition), include paid maternity and paternity leave, high employment for women in the public sector, combining flexible work with living wages and benefits, providing public support for women in their traditional responsibilities for care giving and policies to stimulate women's political participation and leadership. Reviewing policies and institutional practices for their impact on women had become common in social democratic governance.

The Social Democratic Party was defeated in 2006 by the centre-right Alliance for Sweden coalition. Mona Sahlin succeeded Göran Persson as party leader in 2007, becoming the party's first female party leader. Prior to the 2010 Swedish general election, the Social Democratic Party formed a cooperation with the Green Party and the Left Party culminating in the Red–Green alliance. The cooperation was dissolved following another defeat in 2010, throwing the party in to its longest period in opposition since before 1936. Sahlin announced her resignation following the 2010 defeat and she was succeeded by Håkan Juholt in 2011. Initially, his leadership gave a rise in the opinion polls before being involved in a scandal surrounding benefits from parliament which after a period culminated in his resignation. Sahlin and Juholt become the first SAP party leaders since Claes Tholin, who was party leader 1896–1907, to not become Prime Ministers of Sweden.

Stefan Löfvén, elected by the party council, succeeded Juholt as party leader. Löfvén led the Social Democratic Party into the 2014 European Parliament election which resulted in the party's worst electoral results at national level since universal suffrage was introduced in 1921. He then led the party into the 2014 Swedish general election which resulted in the party's second worst election result to the Riksdag since universal suffrage was introduced in 1921. With a hung parliament, Löfvén formed a minority coalition government with the Green Party. On 2 October 2014, the Riksdag approved Löfvén to become the country's prime minister, and he took office on 3 October 2014 alongside his Cabinet. The Social Democratic Party and the Green Party voted in favour of Löfvén becoming Prime Minister while the Left Party, a close ally of the SAP, abstained. The oppositional Alliance-parties also abstained while the Sweden Democrats voted against.

In the 2018 Swedish general election, the Social Democrats' vote share fell to 28.3 percent, its lowest level of support since 1911. Nevertheless, a Social Democrat and Green Party coalition government was formed in January 2019. Relying on support of the Centre Party and Liberals, it was one of the weakest governments in Swedish history.

In August 2021, Prime Minister Stefan Löfven announced his resignation and finance minister Magdalena Andersson was elected as the new head of Sweden's ruling Social Democrats in November 2021. On 30 November 2021, Magdalena Andersson became Sweden's first female prime minister. She formed a minority government made up of only her Social Democrats. Her plan for forming a new coalition government with the Green Party was unsuccessful because her budget proposal failed to pass.

On 18 October 2022, liberal-conservative leader Ulf Kristersson became the new prime minister to succeed Magdalena Andersson, meaning that the Social Democratic Party, although still Sweden's largest party, would be in the opposition.

On 12 June 2025, the Social Democratic Party adopted a new party program that established it as having an anti-capitalist view of society.

== Election results ==
=== Riksdag ===
In the 1890s, the Social Democrats usually stood on the same ticket as the Liberals.

Election	Leader	Votes	%	Seats	+/–	Status
1896	Claes Tholin	206	0.1 (#5)	1 / 230	▲1	Opposition
1899	Claes Tholin	313	0.2 (#5)	1 / 230	Steady	Opposition
1902	Claes Tholin	6,321	3.5 (#3)	4 / 230	▲3	Opposition
1905	Claes Tholin	20,677	9.5 (#3)	13 / 230	▲9	Opposition
1908	Hjalmar Branting	45,155	14.6 (#3)	34 / 230	▲21	Opposition
1911	Hjalmar Branting	172,196	28.5 (#3)	64 / 230	▲30	Opposition
Mar 1914	Hjalmar Branting	228,712	30.1 (#3)	73 / 230	▲9	Opposition
Sep 1914	Hjalmar Branting	266,133	36.4 (#2)	87 / 230	▲14	Opposition
1917	Hjalmar Branting	228,777	31.1 (#1)	86 / 230	▼1	Coalition
1920	Hjalmar Branting	195,121	29.6 (#1)	75 / 230	▼11	Opposition
1921	Hjalmar Branting	630,855	36.2 (#1)	93 / 230	▲18	Minority (1921–1923)
1921	Hjalmar Branting	630,855	36.2 (#1)	93 / 230	▲18	Opposition (1923–1924)
1924	Hjalmar Branting	725,407	41.1 (#1)	104 / 230	▲11	Minority (1924–1926)
1924	Hjalmar Branting	725,407	41.1 (#1)	104 / 230	▲11	Opposition (1926–1928)
1928	Per Albin Hansson	873,931	37.0 (#1)	90 / 230	▼14	Opposition
1932	Per Albin Hansson	1,040,689	41.7 (#1)	104 / 230	▲14	Minority (1932–1936)
1932	Per Albin Hansson	1,040,689	41.7 (#1)	104 / 230	▲14	Opposition (1936)
1936	Per Albin Hansson	1,338,120	45.9 (#1)	112 / 230	▲9	Coalition
1940	Per Albin Hansson	1,546,804	53.8 (#1)	134 / 230	▲22	Coalition
1944	Per Albin Hansson	1,436,571	46.6 (#1)	115 / 230	▼19	Coalition
1948	Tage Erlander	1,789,459	46.1 (#1)	112 / 230	▼3	Minority
1952	Tage Erlander	1,729,463	46.1 (#1)	110 / 230	▼2	Coalition
1956	Tage Erlander	1,729,463	44.6 (#1)	106 / 231	▼4	Coalition
1958	Tage Erlander	1,776,667	46.2 (#1)	111 / 231	▲5	Minority
1960	Tage Erlander	2,033,016	47.8 (#1)	114 / 232	▲3	Minority
1964	Tage Erlander	2,006,923	47.3 (#1)	113 / 233	▼1	Minority
1968	Tage Erlander	2,420,242	50.1 (#1)	125 / 233	▲12	Majority
1970	Olof Palme	2,256,369	45.3 (#1)	163 / 350	▲38	Minority
1973	Olof Palme	2,247,727	43.6 (#1)	156 / 350	▼7	Minority
1976	Olof Palme	2,324,603	42.7 (#1)	152 / 349	▼4	Opposition
1979	Olof Palme	2,356,234	43.2 (#1)	154 / 349	▲2	Opposition
1982	Olof Palme	2,533,250	45.6 (#1)	166 / 349	▲12	Minority
1985	Olof Palme	2,487,551	44.7 (#1)	159 / 349	▼7	Minority
1988	Ingvar Carlsson	2,321,826	43.2 (#1)	156 / 349	▼3	Minority
1991	Ingvar Carlsson	2,062,761	37.7 (#1)	138 / 349	▼18	Opposition
1994	Ingvar Carlsson	2,513,905	45.2 (#1)	161 / 349	▲23	Minority
1998	Göran Persson	1,914,426	36.4 (#1)	131 / 349	▼30	Minority
2002	Göran Persson	2,113,560	39.9 (#1)	144 / 349	▲13	Minority
2006	Göran Persson	1,942,625	35.0 (#1)	130 / 349	▼14	Opposition
2010	Mona Sahlin	1,827,497	30.7 (#1)	112 / 349	▼18	Opposition
2014	Stefan Löfven	1,932,711	31.0 (#1)	113 / 349	▲1	Coalition
2018	Stefan Löfven	1,830,386	28.3 (#1)	100 / 349	▼13	Coalition (2018–2021)
2018	Stefan Löfven	1,830,386	28.3 (#1)	100 / 349	▼13	Minority (2021–2022)
2022	Magdalena Andersson	1,964,474	30.3 (#1)	107 / 349	▲7	Opposition
2026	Magdalena Andersson	1,895,989	28.02 (#1)	99 / 349	▼8	

=== European Parliament ===
Election	List leader	Votes	%	Seats	+/−	EP Group
1995	Maj Britt Theorin	752,817	28.06 (#1)	7 / 22	New	PES
1999	Pierre Schori	657,497	25.99 (#1)	6 / 22	▼1	PES
2004	Inger Segelström	616,963	24.56 (#1)	5 / 19	▼1	PES
2009	Marita Ulvskog	773,513	24.41 (#1)	5 / 18 6 / 20	▲1	S&D
2014	Marita Ulvskog	899,074	24.19 (#1)	5 / 20	▼1	S&D
2019	Heléne Fritzon	974,589	23.48 (#1)	5 / 20	Steady	S&D
2024	Heléne Fritzon	1,037,090	24.77 (#1)	5 / 20	Steady	S&D

=== Statistical changes in voter base ===
Based on the Sveriges Television's exit polls.

Socio-economic groups and gender of voters	Percentage of which voting for the Social Democrats						
Group/Gender	2002	2006	2010	2014	2018	2022	2026
Blue-collar workers	50	45	41	39	34	32	31
White-collar workers	32	24	20	24	27	32	28
Businessmen and farmers	18	13	16	15	13	19	15
Male	38	30	25	30	25	26	23
Female	37	31	29	32	31	34	33

== Party organisation and voter base ==
SAP has been the largest party in the Riksdag since 1914. The member base is diverse, but it prominently features organized blue-collar workers and public sector employees. The party has a close, historical relationship with the Swedish Trade Union Confederation (LO). As a corporatist organ, it has also formed policy in compromise mediation with employers' associations (primarily the Confederation of Swedish Enterprise and its predecessors) as well as trade unions.

Organisations within the Swedish Social Democratic movement include:

- The Social Democratic Women in Sweden (S-kvinnor) organizes women.
- The Swedish Social Democratic Youth League organizes youth.
- The Social Democratic Students of Sweden organizes university students.
- The Religious Social Democrats of Sweden organizes all members with religious beliefs.
- The LGBT Social Democrats of Sweden (HBT-Socialdemokraterna (Note: Pronounced [hoːbeːˈteː sʊsɪˈɑ̂ːldɛmʊˌkrɑːtɛɳa].)) organizes queer people.

The SAP had its golden age during the mid-1930s to mid-1980s when in half of all general elections it received between 44.6% and 46.2% (averaging 45.3%) of the votes, making it one of the most successful parties in the history of the liberal-democratic world.

In two of the general elections in 1940 and 1968, it got more than 50% of the votes, although both cases had special circumstances. In 1940, all established Swedish parties, except for the Communist Party of Sweden (SKP), participated in a coalition government due to the pressures of the Second World War, and it led to voters most likely wanting one party to be in majority to give a parliament that could not be hung. In 1944, the tides of the war had turned and the Allied nations looked to win, giving voters more confidence in voting by preference and explaining the more normal electoral result of 46.6%. The previously excluded SKP also achieved a result of 10.3% in this election. In 1968, the established Communists, most likely due to bad press about the Soviets overtaking of Czechoslovakia (Prague Spring), got a historically bad result of 3% of the votes while the SAP enjoyed 50.1% and an absolute majority in parliament. Only in a fairly brief period between the elections of 1973 to 1979 did the SAP get below the normal interval of 44.6% to 46.2%, instead scoring an average of 43.2%, losing in 1976 (the first time in 44 years) and again just barely in 1979. However, the Social Democrats won back power in 1982 with a normal result of 45.6%.

The voter base consists of a diverse swathe of people throughout Swedish society, although it is particularly strong amongst organised blue-collar workers.

=== Decline since 2006 ===
In the 2006 Swedish general election, the SAP received the smallest share of votes (34.99%) ever in a Swedish general election with universal suffrage, resulting in the loss of office to the opposition, the centre-right coalition Alliance for Sweden. Among the support that the SAP lost was the vote of pensioners (down 10% from 2002) and blue-collar trade unionists (down 5%). The combined SAP and Left Party vote of citizens with non-Nordic foreign backgrounds sank from 73% in 2002 to 48% in 2006. Stockholm County typically votes for the centre-right parties and only 23% of Stockholm City residents voted for the SAP in 2006.

From 2006 to 2014, the SAP lost two consecutive terms to the centre-right Alliance due to the centrist liberal attitudes of then-Prime Minister Fredrik Reinfeldt attracting some of the SAP voters. In 2010, 2014 and 2018, the vote share of SAP dramatically declined, with some of these votes being lost to the right-wing populist party, Sweden Democrats.

In the 2018 Swedish general election, the Social Democrats' vote share fell to 28.3 percent, its lowest level of support since 1908.

In the 2022 Swedish general election, the Social Democrats remained Sweden's largest party, with 30.3% of the vote, however a right-wing bloc won a slim majority in the parliament.

== Party leaders ==
Party leader	Period	Notes	Party secretary
Claes Tholin	1896–1907	First party leader after collective leadership.	Karl Magnus Ziesnitz; Carl Gustaf Wickman
Hjalmar Branting	1907–1925	Prime Minister (1920, 1921–1923 and 1924–1925); Died in office.	Carl Gustaf Wickman; Fredrik Ström; Gustav Möller
Per Albin Hansson	1925–1946	Prime Minister (1932–1936 and 1936–1946); Died in office.	Gustav Möller; Torsten Nilsson; Sven Andersson
Tage Erlander	1946–1969	Prime Minister (1946–1969). Longest-serving Prime Minister in Swedish history.	Sven Andersson; Sven Aspling; Sten Andersson
Olof Palme	1969–1986	Prime Minister (1969–1976 and 1982–1986); Assassinated.	Sten Andersson; Bo Toresson
Ingvar Carlsson	1986–1996	Prime Minister (1986–1991 and 1994–1996)	Bo Toresson; Mona Sahlin; Leif Linde
Göran Persson	1996–2007	Prime Minister (1996–2006)	Ingela Thalén; Lars Stjernkvist; Marita Ulvskog
Mona Sahlin	2007–2011	First female leader of the party.	Marita Ulvskog; Ibrahim Baylan
Håkan Juholt	2011–2012	Resigned after a scandal.	Carin Jämtin
Stefan Löfven	2012–2021	Prime Minister (2014–2021)	Carin Jämtin; Lena Rådström Baastad
Magdalena Andersson	2021–	Prime Minister (2021–2022)	Tobias Baudin

== Notable people ==
- Magdalena Andersson (1967–present), first female PM of Sweden, member of Social Democratic Party of Sweden.
- Hildur Humla (1889–1969), Swedish politician, member of Social Democratic Party of Sweden.
- Göta Rosén (1904–2006), politician and child welfare inspector

== See also ==
- Arbetarnas bildningsförbund
- Aktuellt i Politiken
- Welfare in Sweden

== Literature ==
- Andersson, Jenny (2006). Between growth and security: Swedish social democracy from a strong society to a third way. Manchester University Press.
- Johansson, Karl Magnus; Von Sydow, Göran (2011). Swedish social democracy and European integration: Enduring divisions. Routledge. pp. 157–187.
- Therborn, Göran & Kjellberg, Anders & Marklund, Staffan & Öhlund, Ulf (1978) "Sweden Before and After Social Democracy: A First Overview", Acta Sociologica 1978 – supplement, pp. 37–58.
- Therborn, Göran (1984) "The Coming of Swedish Social Democracy", in E. Collotti (ed.) Il movimiento operaio tra le due guerre, Milano: Annali della Fondazione Giangiacomo Feltrinelli 1983/84, pp. 527–593.
- Östberg, Kjell (2012). Swedish Social Democracy After the Cold War: Whatever Happened to the Movement?. Athabasca University Press. pp. 205–234.
