= Minister for Digital Development (Sweden) =

- IT-minister
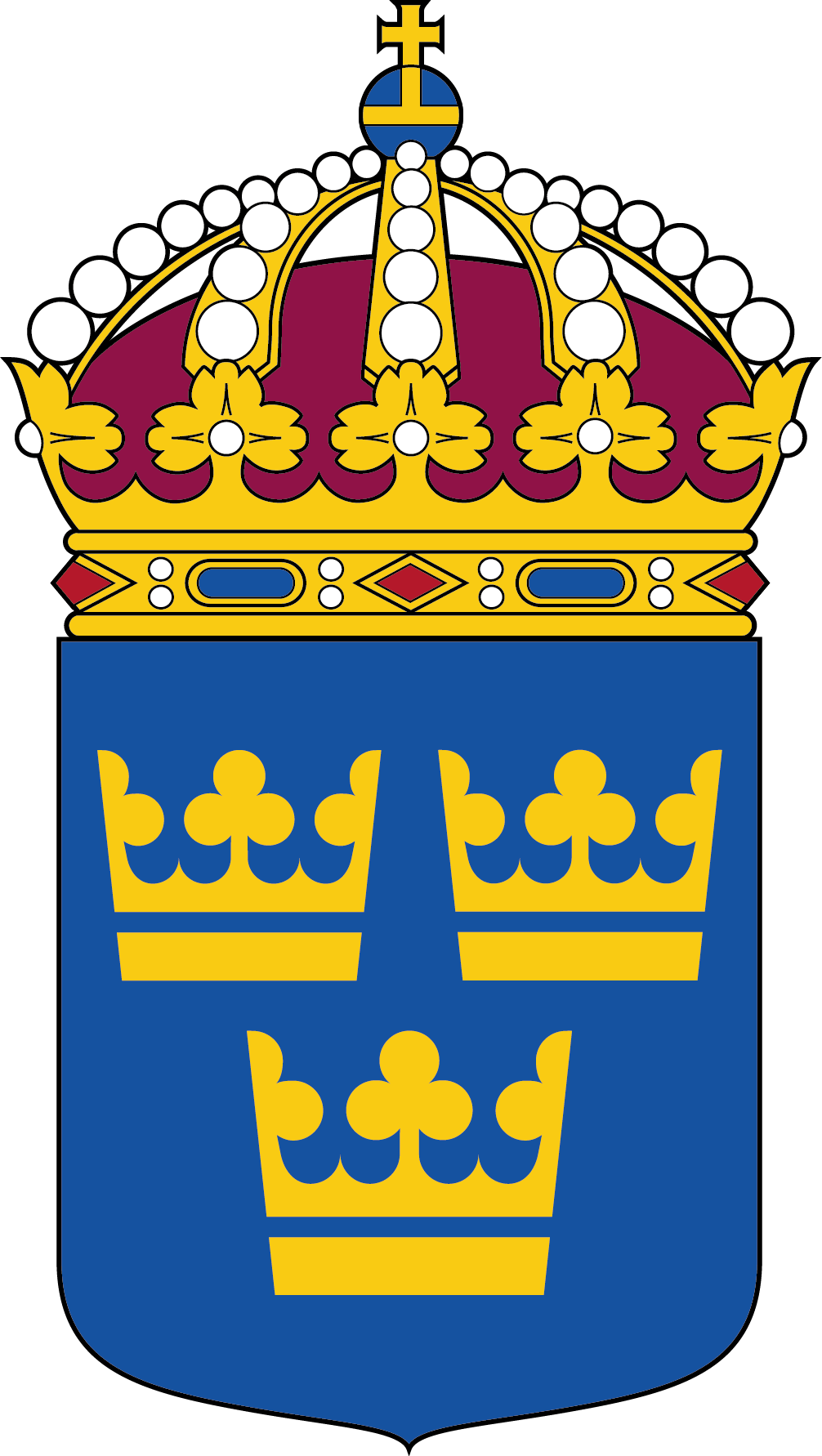
- Lesser coat of arms of Sweden

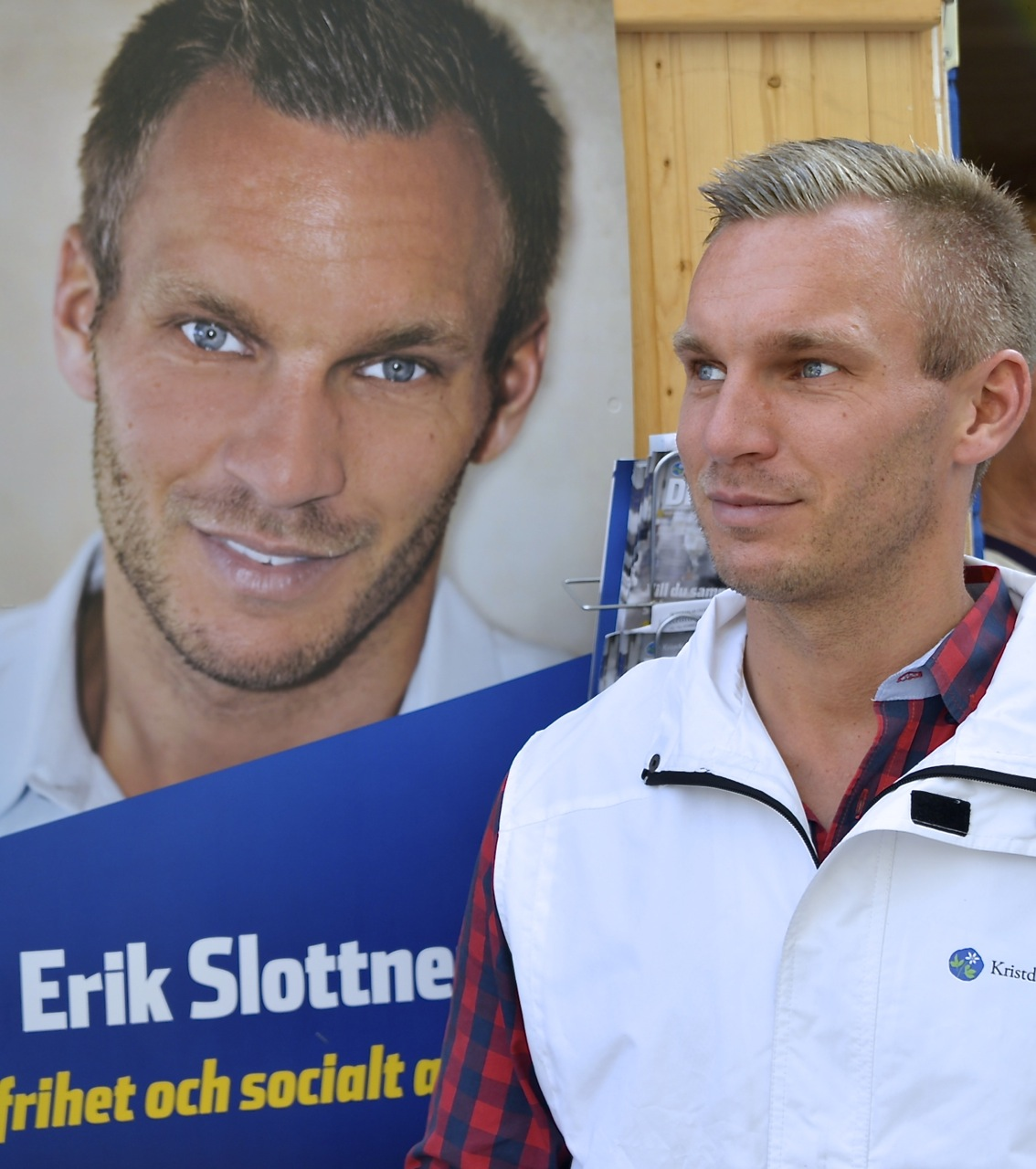
- Incumbent; Erik Slottner since 18 October 2022
- Member of: The Government
- Appointer: The Prime Minister
- Inaugural holder: Ines Uusmann
- Formation: 1994

The Minister for Digital Development (Swedish: IT-minister) is a cabinet minister within the Government of Sweden and appointed by the Prime Minister of Sweden.

The minister is responsible for issues regarding Information technology, electronic communication, digitalization and internet safety. The Minister for Digital Development is Erik Slottner, appointed on 18 October 2022.

== List of ministers for digital development ==
Color key

Independent Social Democrats Moderate Centre Left Liberals Christian Democrats Green Sweden Democrats

Status

Denotes acting Minister for Information Technology

Portrait	Minister for Culture (Born-Died)	Position	Term			Political party	Coalition	Cabinet
Portrait	Minister for Culture (Born-Died)	Position	Took office	Left office	Duration	Political party	Coalition	Cabinet
Ines Uusmann	Ines Uusmann (born 1948)	Minister for Communications	7 October 1994	6 October 1998	3 years, 364 days	Social Democrats	S	Carlsson III Cabinet; Persson Cabinet
Björn Rosengren	Björn Rosengren (born 1942)	Minister for Enterprise	7 October 1998	15 October 2002	4 years, 8 days	Social Democrats	S	Persson Cabinet
Ulrika Messing	Ulrika Messing (born 1968)	Minister for Infrastructure	15 October 2002	6 October 2006	3 years, 356 days	Social Democrats	S	Persson Cabinet
Åsa Torstensson	Åsa Torstensson (born 1958)	Minister for Infrastructure	6 October 2006	5 October 2010	3 years, 364 days	Centre	M–C–L–KD	Reinfeldt Cabinet
Anna-Karin Hatt	Anna-Karin Hatt (born 1972)	Minister for Energy	5 October 2010	3 October 2014	3 years, 363 days	Centre	M–C–L–KD	Reinfeldt Cabinet
Mehmet Kaplan	Mehmet Kaplan (born 1971)	Minister for Housing and Urban Development	3 October 2014	18 April 2016	1 year, 198 days	Green	S–MP	Löfven I Cabinet
Per Bolund	Per Bolund (born 1971); Acting	Minister for Financial Markets	18 April 2016	25 May 2016	37 days	Green	S–MP	Löfven I Cabinet
Peter Eriksson	Peter Eriksson (born 1958)	Minister for Digitalization, Housing and Urban Development	25 May 2016	21 January 2019	2 years, 241 days	Green	S–MP	Löfven I Cabinet
Anders Ygeman	Anders Ygeman (born 1970)	Minister for Energy and Digital Development	21 January 2019	30 November 2021	2 years, 313 days	Social Democrats	S–MP	Löfven II Cabinet
Khashayar Farmanbar	Khashayar Farmanbar (born 1976)	Minister for Energy and Digital Development	30 November 2021	18 October 2022	322 days	Social Democrats	S	Andersson Cabinet
Erik Slottner	Erik Slottner (born 1976)	Minister for Public Administration	18 October 2022		4 years, 17 days	Christian Democrats	M–KD–L	Kristersson Cabinet
