= Andersson cabinet =

56th Cabinet of Sweden

Magdalena Andersson cabinet
- 56th Cabinet of Sweden

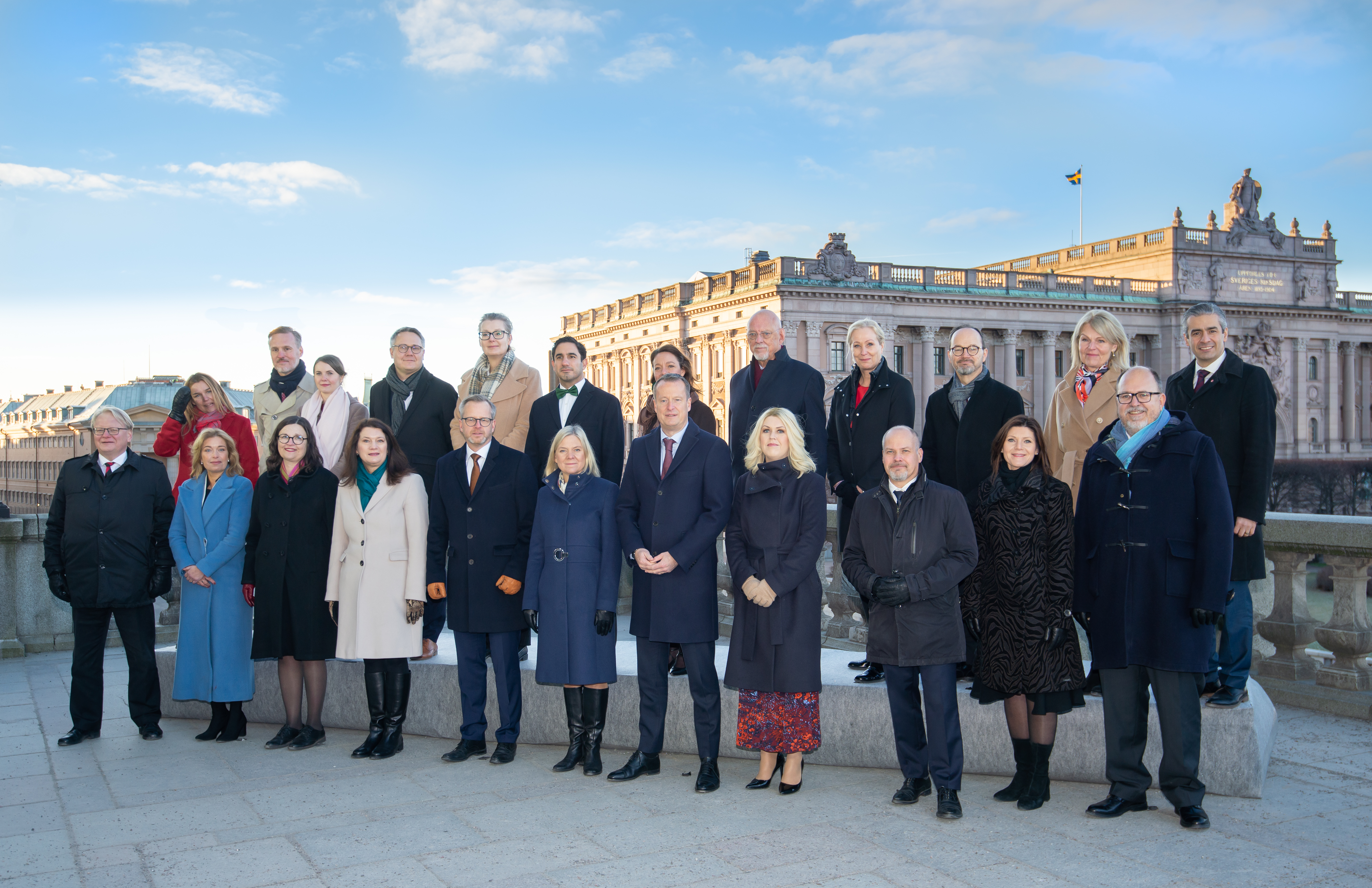
- Cabinet ministers outside Stockholm Palace, 30 November 2021
- Date formed: 30 November 2021
- Date dissolved: 18 October 2022

People and organisations
- Head of state: Carl XVI Gustaf
- Head of government: Magdalena Andersson
- Deputy head of government: Morgan Johansson
- No. of ministers: 22
- Member party: Social Democrats
- Status in legislature: Single-party minority with flexible support from Centre Party, Left Party, and Green Party
- Opposition parties: Moderate Party; Sweden Democrats; Christian Democrats; Liberals
- Opposition leader: Ulf Kristersson (M)

History
- Incoming formation: Resignation of Stefan Löfven
- Outgoing formation: 2022 election
- Election: 2022 election
- Legislature terms: 2018–2022
- Predecessor: Löfven III cabinet
- Successor: Kristersson cabinet

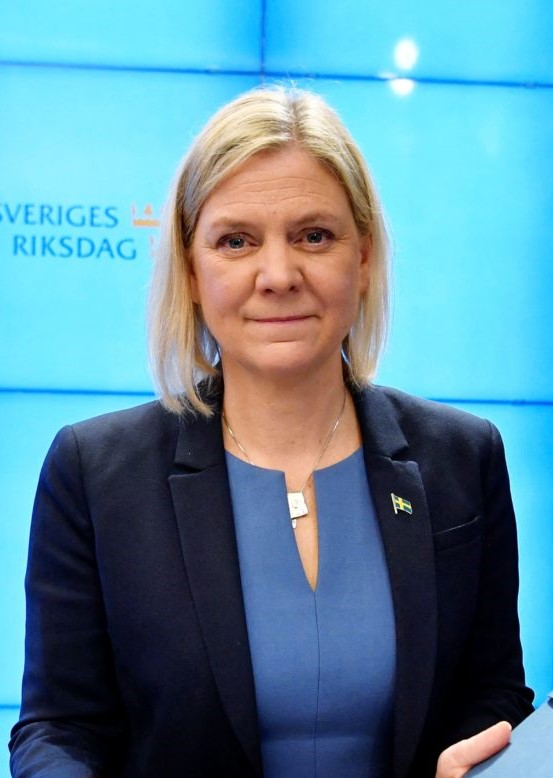
Prime Minister Magdalena Andersson.

The Andersson cabinet (Swedish: regeringen Andersson) was the government of Sweden from 30 November 2021 to 18 October 2022. It was a Social Democratic single-party minority government led by Prime Minister Magdalena Andersson, the first ever woman to hold the post in Swedish history.

The cabinet followed the resignation of incumbent Prime Minister Stefan Löfven. It was originally planned to be installed on 26 November 2021, as a coalition government between the Social Democrats and the Green Party. However, in a late turn of events after the confirmation vote, the Green Party left the government due to the government's budget proposal failing in the Riksdag (Swedish parliament). Because of this, Andersson decided to resign; this happened just seven hours after the vote in the Riksdag. The speaker then set Andersson up for a new confirmation vote to make sure she still had the Riksdag's approval. On 29 November, Andersson won the vote in the Riksdag and became the new prime minister of Sweden.

When Andersson's cabinet took office on 30 November 2021, it became the smallest Swedish government since the Ullsten cabinet (1978–1979), relying on only 100 of 349 parliament members (28.65%). On 14 September 2022, following the election in which her support coalition lost their parliamentary majority, Andersson announced that she would tender her resignation as prime minister on the following day. On 18 October, the cabinet was succeeded by the centre-right Kristersson cabinet.

== Formation ==
=== Social Democratic-Green coalition ===
In the Riksdag, as long as the Speaker's proposal for a new prime minister is not opposed by half of its members, the proposal is carried.

The Riksdag initially elected Social Democratic leader Magdalena Andersson as Prime Minister on 24 November 2021, with only a slim minority voting against her (174 'no' votes out of the 349-strong Riksdag). This made her the first female prime minister in Swedish history. One member of the Riksdag from the Left Party was absent during the vote.

=== Departure of the Green Party ===
After Andersson's budget proposal was defeated hours later on 24 November by a counter proposal from the Moderate Party, Sweden Democrats and Christian Democrats, the Green Party decided to leave the government. However, the Greens were willing to support a one-party Social Democratic minority government.

According to precedent, a new confidence vote must be held in the Riksdag whenever the composition of a government is changed. Since Andersson was elected by parliament with the promise of retaining the Social Democratic-Green coalition she had no choice but to resign only seven hours after being approved. This resignation allowed a new investiture vote to happen in parliament on 29 November when Andersson was approved again with a slim minority voting against her (173 'no' votes out of the 349-strong Riksdag). This is one 'no'-vote less than the vote on 24 November. Member of Parliament Nina Lundström from the Liberals decided to rebel against her party and thus not vote 'no' but abstain instead to Andersson becoming prime minister saying that electing her is the only way to keep the Sweden Democrats from power.

== Ministers ==
The following were the cabinet members:

Portfolio	Minister	Took office	Left office	Party
Prime Minister's Office
Prime Minister	Magdalena Andersson	30 November 2021	18 October 2022	Social Democrats
Deputy Prime Minister not a separate minister post	Morgan Johansson	30 November 2021	18 October 2022	Social Democrats
Minister for EU Affairs	Hans Dahlgren	30 November 2021	18 October 2022	Social Democrats
Ministry of Justice
Minister for Justice; Minister of the Interior	Morgan Johansson	30 November 2021	18 October 2022	Social Democrats
Minister for Integration; Minister for Migration; Minister for Sports	Anders Ygeman	30 November 2021	18 October 2022	Social Democrats
Ministry of Foreign Affairs
Minister for Foreign Affairs	Ann Linde	30 November 2021	18 October 2022	Social Democrats
Minister of Foreign Trade; Minister for Nordic Cooperation	Anna Hallberg	30 November 2021	18 October 2022	Social Democrats
Minister for International Development Cooperation	Matilda Ernkrans	30 November 2021	18 October 2022	Social Democrats
Ministry of Defence
Minister for Defence	Peter Hultqvist	30 November 2021	18 October 2022	Social Democrats
Ministry of Health and Social Affairs
Minister for Health and Social Affairs	Lena Hallengren	30 November 2021	6 October 2022	Social Democrats
Minister for Health and Social Affairs; Minister for Social Security	Ardalan Shekarabi	6 October 2022	18 October 2022	Social Democrats
Minister for Social Security	Ardalan Shekarabi	30 November 2021	18 October 2022	Social Democrats
Ministry of Finance
Minister for Finance	Mikael Damberg	30 November 2021	18 October 2022	Social Democrats
Minister for Financial Markets; Minister for Consumer Affairs; Deputy Minister for Finance	Max Elger	30 November 2021	18 October 2022	Social Democrats
Minister for Public Administration	Ida Karkiainen	30 November 2021	18 October 2022	Social Democrats
Ministry of Education and Research
Minister for Education	Anna Ekström	30 November 2021	18 October 2022	Social Democrats
Minister for Schools	Lina Axelsson Kihlblom	30 November 2021	18 October 2022	Social Democrats
Ministry of the Environment
Minister for the Environment; Minister for the Climate	Annika Strandhäll	30 November 2021	18 October 2022	Social Democrats
Ministry of Enterprise and Innovation
Minister for Enterprise	Karl-Petter Thorwaldsson	30 November 2021	18 October 2022	Social Democrats
Minister for Rural Affairs	Anna-Caren Sätherberg	30 November 2021	18 October 2022	Social Democrats
Ministry of Culture
Minister for Culture; Minister for Democracy	Jeanette Gustafsdotter	30 November 2021	18 October 2022	Social Democrats
Ministry of Employment
Minister for Employment; Minister for Gender Equality	Eva Nordmark	30 November 2021	18 October 2022	Social Democrats
Minister for Housing; Deputy Minister for Employment	Johan Danielsson	30 November 2021	18 October 2022	Social Democrats
Ministry of Infrastructure
Minister for Infrastructure	Tomas Eneroth	30 November 2021	18 October 2022	Social Democrats
Minister for Energy; Minister for Digital Development	Khashayar Farmanbar	30 November 2021	18 October 2022	Social Democrats

== Policy ==
A specific policy manifesto were presented when Andersson held her declaration of government (regeringsförklaring) 30 November 2021.

Preceded by Löfven III cabinet	Cabinet of Sweden; 2021–2022	Succeeded by Kristersson cabinet
