= Khashayar Farmanbar =

Swedish politician (born 1976)

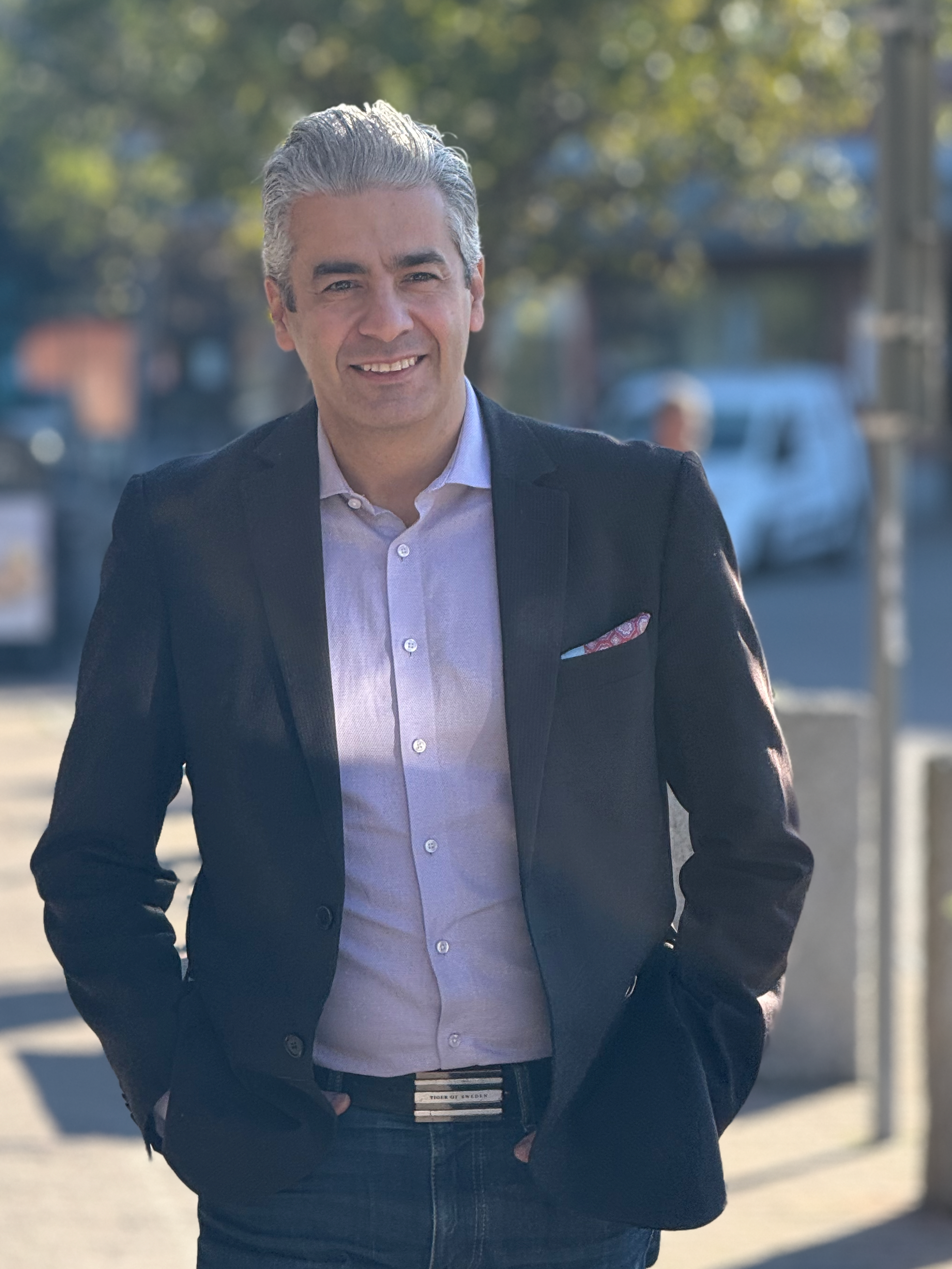

Minister for Energy Minister for Digital Development
- In office 30 November 2021 – 18 October 2022
- Monarch: Carl XVI Gustaf
- Prime Minister: Magdalena Andersson
- Preceded by: Anders Ygeman
- Succeeded by: Ebba Busch (Energy); Erik Slottner (Digital Development)

Personal details
- Born: Khashayar Carl Farmanbar; 21 September 1976 (age 49) Tehran, Iran
- Party: Social Democrats
- Spouse: Tora Maria Rebecka Hansjons

Khashayar Carl Farmanbar (born 21 September 1976) is a Swedish entrepreneur and politician for the Social Democratic Party. From 30 November 2021 until 18 October 2022, he was Minister for Energy and Minister for Digital Development in Magdalena Andersson's Cabinet, replacing Anders Ygeman.

Farmanbar was born in Teheran but lived in Boden after coming to Sweden at twelve years of age. He studied computer engineering and marketing at Luleå University of Technology and has worked in the IT sector. Before becoming minister, he was oppositional municipal commissioner in Nacka, where has lived since 2007.
