= Minister for Migration (Sweden) =

Minister in the Swedish government

- Migrationsminister
- Lesser coat of arms of Sweden

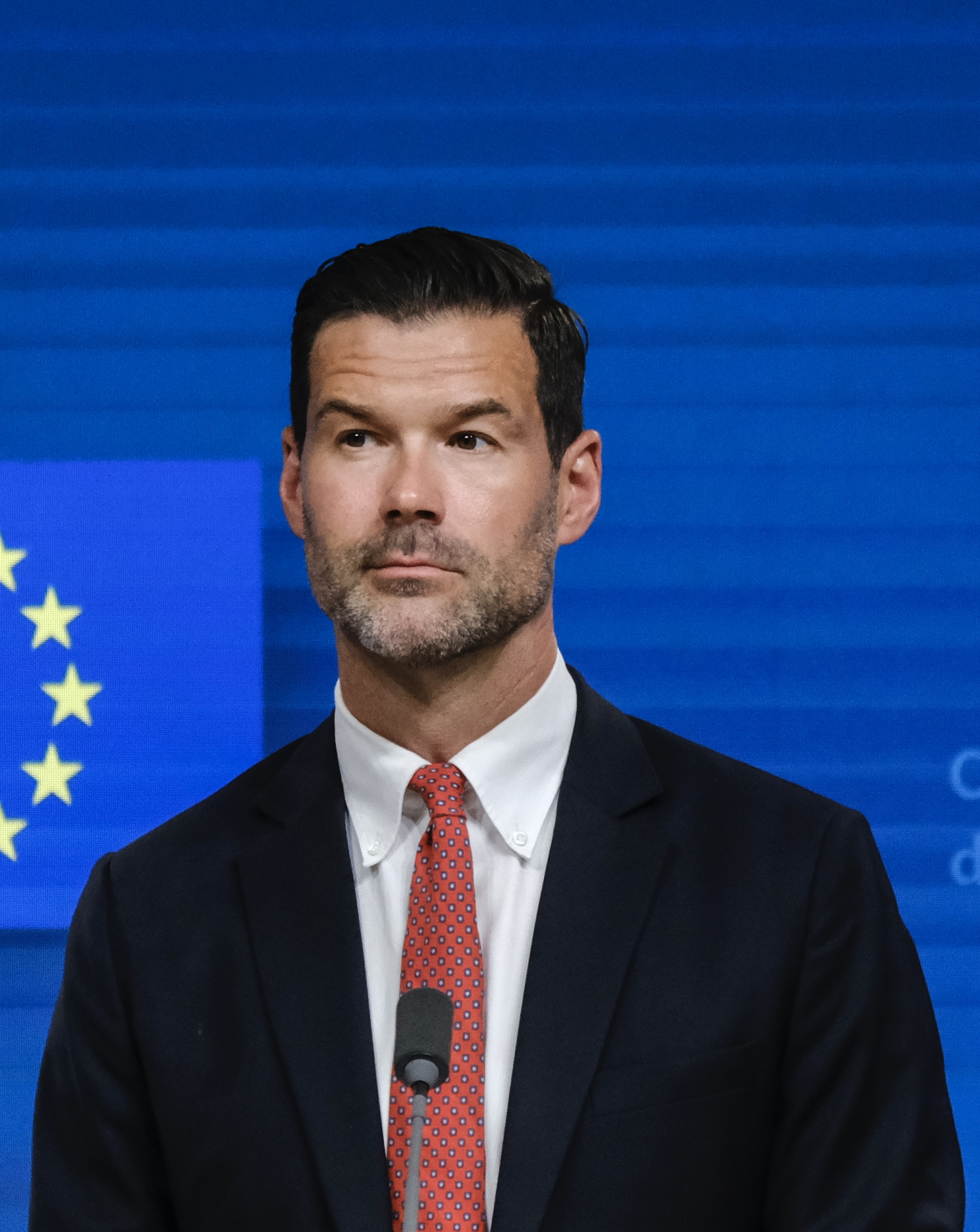
- Incumbent; Johan Forssell since 10 September 2024
- Ministry of Justice
- Member of: The Government
- Seat: Stockholm, Sweden
- Appointer: The Prime Minister
- Term length: No fixed term; serves at the pleasure of the Prime Minister
- Formation: 1996
- First holder: Pierre Schori

The Minister for Migration, (Swedish: migrationsminister), formally cabinet minister of the Ministry of Justice, is a member and minister of the Government of Sweden and is appointed by the Prime Minister. The minister is responsible for policies related to migration and asylum policies.

== List of officeholders ==
No.	Portrait	Minister (Born–Died)	Tenure			Political party	Cabinet
No.	Portrait	Minister (Born–Died)	Took office	Left office	Duration	Political party	Cabinet
1		Pierre Schori (born 1938)	22 March 1996	14 September 1999	3 years, 176 days	Social Democrats	Persson
2		Maj-Inger Klingvall (born 1946)	14 September 1999	16 November 2001	2 years, 63 days	Social Democrats	Persson
3		Jan O. Karlsson (1939–2016)	7 January 2002	10 October 2003	1 year, 276 days	Social Democrats	Persson
4		Barbro Holmberg (born 1952)	10 October 2003	6 October 2006	2 years, 361 days	Social Democrats	Persson
5		Tobias Billström (born 1973)	6 October 2006	3 October 2014	7 years, 362 days	Moderate	Reinfeldt
6		Morgan Johansson (born 1970)	3 October 2014	27 July 2017	2 years, 297 days	Social Democrats	Löfven I
7		Heléne Fritzon (born 1960)	27 July 2017	21 January 2019	1 year, 178 days	Social Democrats	Löfven I
(6)		Morgan Johansson (born 1970)	21 January 2019	30 November 2021	2 years, 313 days	Social Democrats	Löfven II; Löfven III
8		Anders Ygeman (born 1970)	30 November 2021	18 October 2022	322 days	Social Democrats	Andersson
9		Maria Malmer Stenergard (born 1981)	18 October 2022	10 September 2024	1 year, 328 days	Moderate Party	Kristersson
10		Johan Forssell (born 1979)	10 September 2024		2 years, 20 days	Moderate Party	Kristersson

== Ministry history ==
The office of Minister for Migration has been under several different ministries since its founding in 1996.

Ministry	Term
Ministry for Foreign Affairs	1996–2006
Ministry of Justice	2006–present

== See also ==
- Minister for Immigration
- Minister for Integration
