= Löfven I cabinet =

Swedish cabinet

Stefan Löfven's first cabinet
- 53rd Cabinet of Sweden

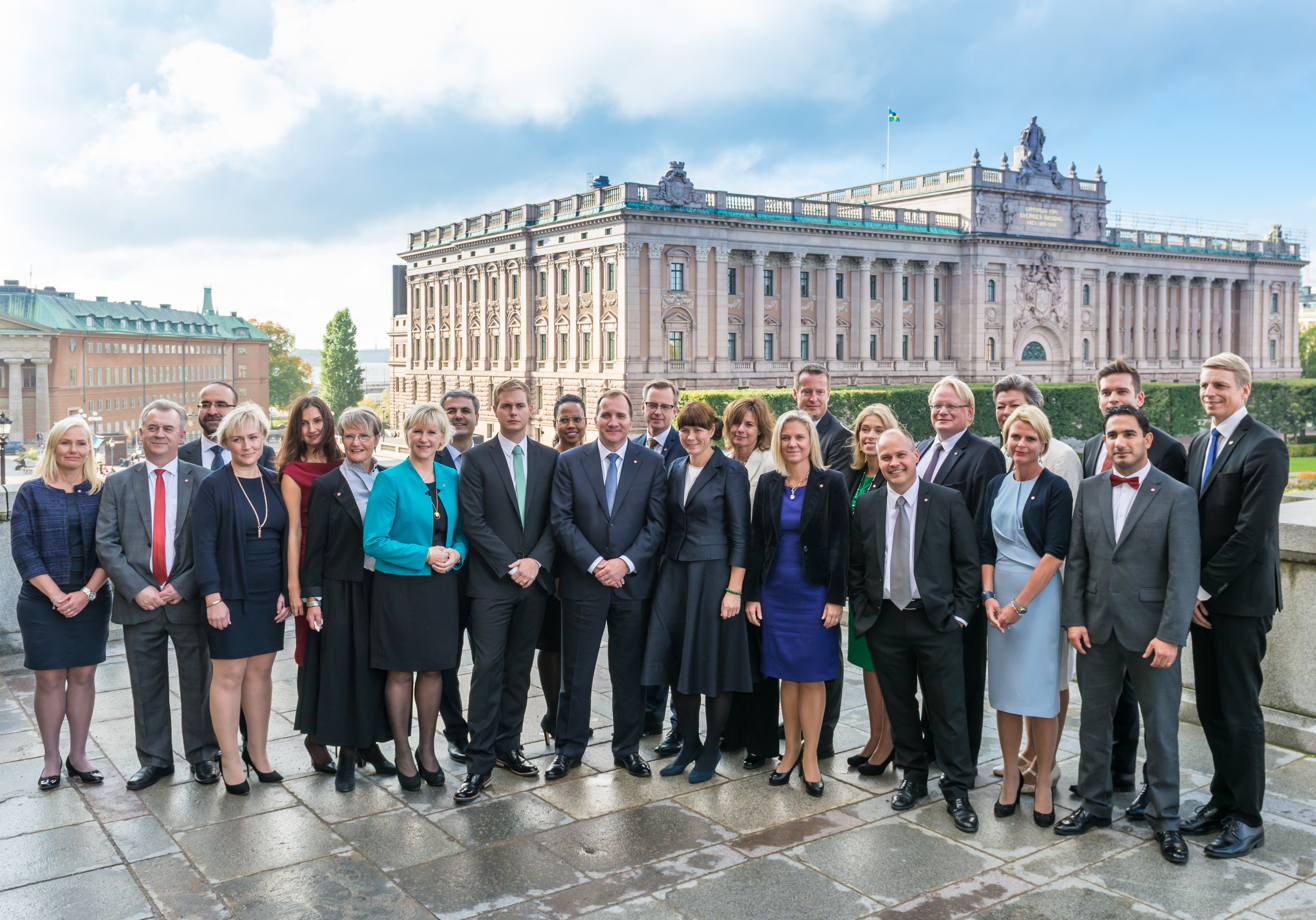
- The Löfven I cabinet outside the Stockholm Royal Palace, 3 October 2014.
- Date formed: 3 October 2014
- Date dissolved: 21 January 2019

People and organisations
- Head of state: Carl XVI Gustaf
- Head of government: Stefan Löfven
- Deputy head of government: Åsa Romson (MP; honorary title; 2014–2016); Isabella Lövin (MP; honorary title; 2016–2019); Margot Wallström (S; acting)
- No. of ministers: 23
- Ministers removed: 5
- Member parties: Social Democrats; Green Party
- Status in legislature: Coalition minority with confidence and supply from Left Party
- Opposition parties: Moderate Party; Sweden Democrats; Centre Party; Liberal People's Party; Christian Democrats
- Opposition leader: Fredrik Reinfeldt (M; 2014–2015); Anna Kinberg Batra (M; 2015–2017); Ulf Kristersson (M; 2017–2019)

History
- Incoming formation: 2014 election
- Outgoing formation: 2018 election Motion of no confidence
- Elections: 2014 election 2018 election
- Legislature terms: 2014–2018
- Predecessor: Reinfeldt cabinet
- Successor: Löfven II cabinet

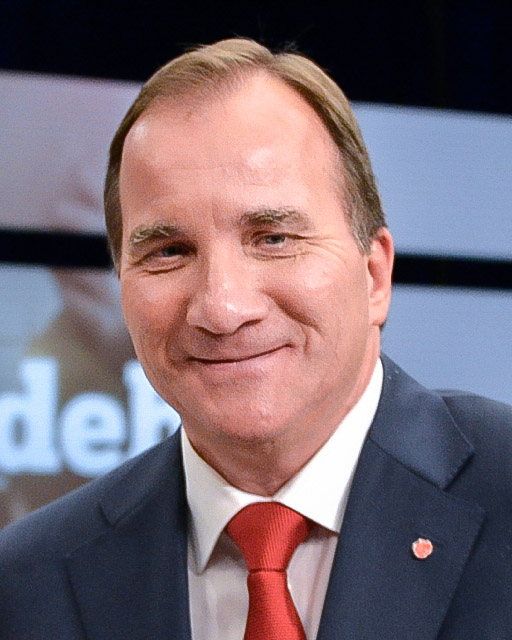
Prime Minister Stefan Löfven.

The Löfven I cabinet (Swedish: regeringen Löfven I) was the government of Sweden from 3 October 2014 to 21 January 2019. It was a coalition minority government between the Social Democrats and the Green Party, with confidence and supply from the Left Party, led by Prime Minister Stefan Löfven of the Social Democrats. It was the first time that the Green Party had been part of a government and the first time in 57 years that the Social Democrats had formed a coalition government.

The cabinet was installed following the 2014 general election, after a formal government meeting with King Carl XVI Gustaf on 3 October 2014. Stefan Löfven had previously announced his cabinet ministers at 09:00 AM on the same day. On 25 September 2018, after the 2018 general election, the Riksdag (Swedish parliament) passed a motion of no confidence in it by 204 votes to 142, and Löfven resigned. However, the speaker then invited him to stay on as acting prime minister of a caretaker government. Löfven was reelected as prime minister on 18 January 2019, after a Swedish record-long government formation. On 21 January, the Löfven II cabinet was installed.

With only a total of 37.9 percent of the popular votes in 2014 and 138 out of 349 seats (39.5%) in the Riksdag, the "red-green" coalition began as one of the weakest minority governments in Swedish history and relied on support from other parties in the Riksdag. However, the cabinet ruled out cooperation with the nationalist Sweden Democrats.

== Ministers ==
The cabinet consisted of 12 men and 12 women.

In May 2016, Löfven reshuffled his cabinet. In July 2017, three cabinet ministers (Infrastructure Minister Anna Johansson, Interior Minister Anders Ygeman, and Defense Minister Peter Hultqvist) were challenged by a vote of confidence by the opposition and a majority in the Riksdag. Löfven subsequently removed Johansson and Ygeman from office, but retained Hultqvist, and the no-confidence motion against Hultqvist collapsed in September 2017 after the Centre Party and the Liberals dropped their support for it.

Portfolio	Minister	Took office	Left office	Party
Prime Minister's Office
Prime Minister	Stefan Löfven	3 October 2014	21 January 2019	Social Democrats
Deputy Prime Minister (honorary title) not a separate minister post	Åsa Romson	3 October 2014	25 May 2016	Green
Deputy Prime Minister (honorary title) not a separate minister post	Isabella Lövin	25 May 2016	21 January 2019	Green
Minister for Strategic Development and Nordic Cooperation	Kristina Persson	3 October 2014	25 May 2016	Social Democrats
Minister for Government Coordination; Minister for Energy	Ibrahim Baylan	25 May 2016	21 January 2019	Social Democrats
Ministry of Justice
Minister for Justice; Minister for Migration and Asylum Policy	Morgan Johansson	3 October 2014	27 July 2017	Social Democrats
Minister for Justice; Minister for Interior	Morgan Johansson	27 July 2017	21 January 2019	Social Democrats
Minister of the Interior	Anders Ygeman	3 October 2014	27 July 2017	Social Democrats
Minister for Migration and Asylum Policy; Deputy Minister for Justice	Heléne Fritzon	27 July 2017	21 January 2019	Social Democrats
Ministry for Foreign Affairs
Minister for Foreign Affairs; Deputy Prime Minister (Interim)	Margot Wallström	3 October 2014	21 January 2019	Social Democrats
Minister for International Development Cooperation	Isabella Lövin	3 October 2014	25 May 2016	Green
Minister for International Development Cooperation; Minister for the Climate	Isabella Lövin	25 May 2016	21 January 2019	Green
Minister for EU Affairs and Foreign Trade	Ann Linde	25 May 2016	21 January 2019	Social Democrats
Ministry of Defence
Minister for Defence	Peter Hultqvist	3 October 2014	21 January 2019	Social Democrats
Ministry of Health and Social Affairs
Minister for Social Security	Annika Strandhäll	3 October 2014	27 July 2017	Social Democrats
Minister for Social Affairs	Annika Strandhäll	27 July 2017	21 January 2019	Social Democrats
Minister for Public Health, Healthcare and Sports	Gabriel Wikström	3 October 2014	27 July 2017	Social Democrats
Minister for Children, the Elderly and Gender Equality	Åsa Regnér	3 October 2014	8 March 2018	Social Democrats
Minister for Children, the Elderly and Gender Equality	Lena Hallengren	8 March 2018	21 January 2019	Social Democrats
Ministry of Finance
Minister for Finance	Magdalena Andersson	3 October 2014	21 January 2019	Social Democrats
Minister for Financial Markets; Minister for Consumer Affairs; Deputy Minister for Finance	Per Bolund	3 October 2014	21 January 2019	Green
Minister for Public Administration	Ardalan Shekarabi	3 October 2014	21 January 2019	Social Democrats
Ministry of Education and Research
Minister for Education	Gustav Fridolin	3 October 2014	21 January 2019	Green
Minister for Upper Secondary School and Adult Education and Training	Aida Hadžialić	3 October 2014	13 August 2016	Social Democrats
Minister for Upper Secondary School and Adult Education and Training	Anna Ekström	13 September 2016	21 January 2019	Social Democrats
Minister for Higher Education and Research	Helene Hellmark Knutsson	3 October 2014	21 January 2019	Social Democrats
Ministry of the Environment
Minister for the Climate and the Environment	Åsa Romson	3 October 2014	25 May 2016	Green
Minister for the Environment	Karolina Skog	25 May 2016	21 January 2019	Green
Minister for Energy	Ibrahim Baylan	3 October 2014	25 May 2016	Social Democrats
Ministry of Enterprise
Minister for Enterprise and Innovation	Mikael Damberg	3 October 2014	21 January 2019	Social Democrats
Minister for Housing and Urban Development; Minister for Digitalization	Mehmet Kaplan	3 October 2014	18 April 2016	Green
Minister for Housing and Urban Development; Minister for Digitalization	Per Bolund (Interim)	18 April 2016	25 May 2016	Green
Minister for Housing; Minister for Digital Development	Peter Eriksson	25 May 2016	21 January 2019	Green
Minister for Infrastructure	Anna Johansson	3 October 2014	27 July 2017	Social Democrats
Minister for Infrastructure	Tomas Eneroth	27 July 2017	21 January 2019	Social Democrats
Minister for Rural Affairs	Sven-Erik Bucht	3 October 2014	21 January 2019	Social Democrats
Ministry of Culture
Minister for Culture and Democracy	Alice Bah Kuhnke	3 October 2014	21 January 2019	Green
Ministry of Employment
Minister for Employment	Ylva Johansson	3 October 2014	21 January 2019	Social Democrats

=== Facts and statistics ===
The numbers below refer to the composition of the cabinet at its formation on 3 October 2014.

- Number of ministers: 24 (the Prime Minister included)
- Number of women: 12
- Number of men: 12
- Average age: 45,4
- Youngest minister: Aida Hadžialić (27 years)
- Oldest minister: Kristina Persson (68 years)
- Number of foreign-born ministers: 4

== Party breakdown ==
Party breakdown of cabinet ministers:

- Social Democrats
- Green Party
18
6

== Policy ==
The government announced the outline of its policy on 3 October 2014. Plans included reducing unemployment to the lowest level in the EU by 2020, reducing deficits, phasing out nuclear energy, reducing emissions from fossil fuels and having a more socially liberal asylum policy.

In its statement the government identified as feminist. It aimed to increase gender equality, reduce the gender wage gap and introduce quota if female representation on governing boards is below 40 percent by 2016. It also promised to increase penalties for aggravated sexual offences.

The government's foreign policy consisted of pursuing membership of the Security Council and remaining outside NATO. The government said it opposes ISIL. It was the first EU government to recognise the State of Palestine in view to "facilitate a peace agreement by making the parties less unequal", resulting in that Israel the same day recalled its ambassador for consultations.

== 2014 government crisis ==
On 3 December 2014, the proposed budget of the cabinet failed in the Riksdag due to the Sweden Democrats siding with the centre-right opposition Alliance's budget. Prime Minister Löfven announced plans to call for fresh elections in March 2015. However, on 27 December, the early election was cancelled after the governing parties signed an agreement with the four parties in the opposition Alliance. Under the Decemberöverenskommelsen (December Agreement), the six parties agreed not to vote against a budget proposed by the government for the next eight years. However, the December Agreement fell already in October 2015 when the Christian Democrats decided to leave it.

== 2018–2019 government formation ==
Prime Minister Stefan Löfven lost the motion of no confidence against him and his cabinet on 25 September 2018. 142 members of parliament voted for retaining Löfven's cabinet while 204 voted against. Löfven stated in a subsequent press conference that he would not be stepping down as Social Democratic party leader and that he would be willing to partake in talks regarding the formation of a new government, but insisted that it is ultimately up to the Speaker of the Riksdag. Löfven also stated that he finds it "completely unbelievable that the Alliance could ever form a government", if they intend on keeping their promise of not co-operating with the nationalist Sweden Democrats. Löfven and his cabinet continued to serve as a caretaker government until Löfven was reelected as prime minister in January 2019, 131 days after the 2018 election. 115 MPs voted to re-elect Löfven as prime minister, while 153 voted against him and 77 MPs, representing the Centre Party, the Liberals and the Left Party, abstained. Since the Swedish prime minister is elected through negative parliamentarism, a candidate can be elected to the office if no more than 175 MPs vote against them.

Preceded by Reinfeldt cabinet	Cabinet of Sweden; 2014–2019	Succeeded by Löfven II cabinet
