= Ebba Busch =

Swedish politician (born 1987)

Ebba Busch MP
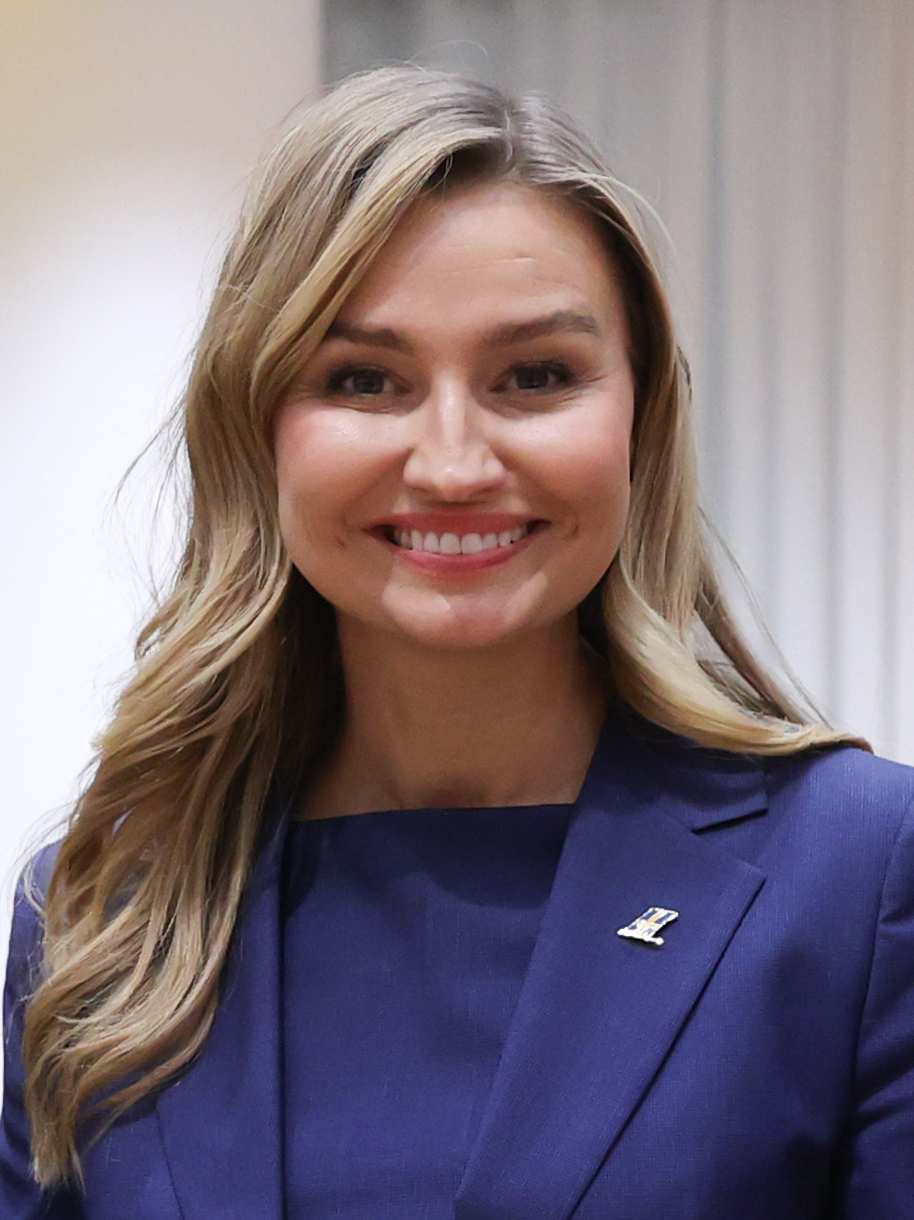
- Busch in 2025

Deputy Prime Minister of Sweden
- Incumbent
- Assumed office 18 October 2022
- Monarch: Carl XVI Gustaf
- Prime Minister: Ulf Kristersson
- Preceded by: Morgan Johansson

Minister for Energy, Business and Industry
- Incumbent
- Assumed office 18 October 2022
- Monarch: Carl XVI Gustaf
- Prime Minister: Ulf Kristersson
- Preceded by: Khashayar Farmanbar (Energy); Karl-Petter Thorwaldsson (Business and Industry)

Leader of the Christian Democrats
- Incumbent
- Assumed office 25 April 2015
- Party secretary: Acko Ankarberg Johansson; Peter Kullgren; Johan Ingerö; Liza-Maria Norlin
- Preceded by: Göran Hägglund

Member of the Riksdag
- Incumbent
- Assumed office 23 September 2018
- Constituency: Västra Götaland County East

Member of the Uppsala City Council
- In office May 2010 – April 2015

Personal details
- Born: Ebba Elisabeth Busch-Christensen; 11 February 1987 (age 39) Uppsala, Sweden
- Citizenship: Sweden; Norway
- Party: Christian Democrats
- Spouse: Niklas Thor (m. 2013; div. 2020)
- Children: 2
- Education: Uppsala University

Ebba-Elisabeth Busch (née Busch-Christensen, formerly Busch Thor; born 11 February 1987) is a Swedish politician who has served as Deputy Prime Minister of Sweden, Minister for Energy, and Minister for Business and Industry since 2022. She has served as Leader of the Christian Democrats since 2015.

She has criticised the shift towards multiculturalism, and also endorsed the controversial move to shift the Swedish embassy in Israel from Tel Aviv to Jerusalem. She argues that Turkish membership in the EU should be rejected.

In March 2021, Busch was embroiled in a criminal investigation for defamation, in which Busch pleaded guilty to a charge of grave defamation, resulting in probation and a SEK 60,000 fine.

== Early life and education ==
Busch was born on 11 February 1987 in Uppsala, Sweden. Born to a Swedish mother and Norwegian father, she identifies as both Norwegian and Swedish. Growing up in Gunsta, near Uppsala, she was a student at the Christian Word of Life primary school. She later studied the IB Diploma Programme at Katedralskolan in Uppsala, and peace and conflict studies at Uppsala University.

== Political career ==
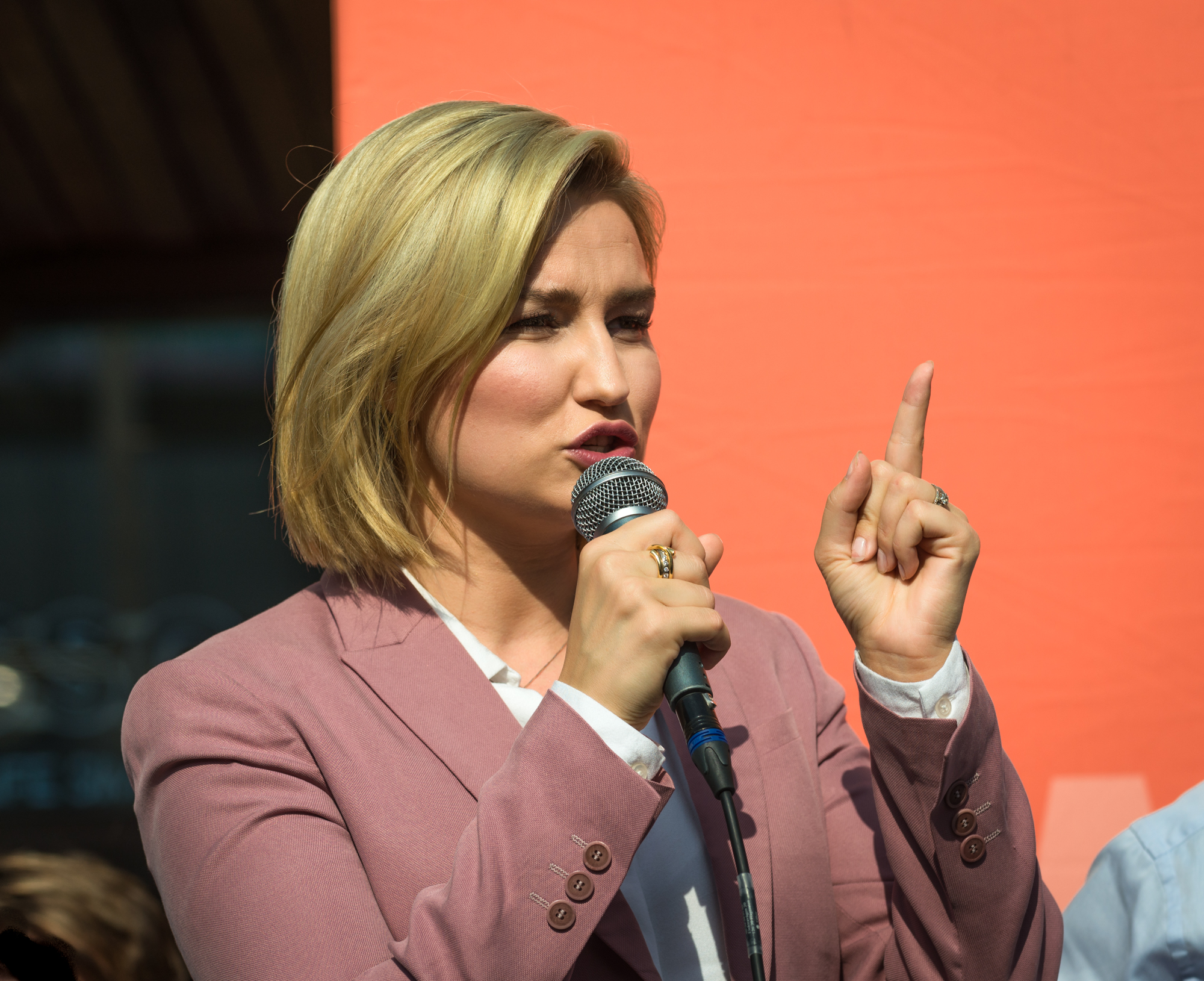
Busch speaking at Sergels Torg in Stockholm before the 2018 election

Busch was the municipal party political secretary for the Christian Democrats councillor Gustaf von Essen in the Uppsala Municipality. In 2009, she assumed responsibility for the budget when Essen went on sick leave, and at the age of 22 she became a substitute municipal councillor.

In the municipal election in Uppsala in 2010, Busch was the top name on the ballot, and received 1,679 votes. Busch served as vice chairman of the Christian Democrat youth organisation until 5 June 2011.

Busch made several comments to the media during 2010 criticizing the then party chairman Göran Hägglund, and what she perceived as his weak leadership following the 2006 General Election. Ahead of the January 2012 leadership election within the party, she supported Hägglund's opponent Mats Odell. She was also herself a candidate for the post of deputy party chairman at the same election, but lost to Maria Larsson. Alf Svensson, former party leader, has described his disappointment with Busch's worldview.

=== Party leader (2016–present) ===
In 2015, Busch was announced as the suggested successor of Göran Hägglund as party leader of the Christian Democratic party, and was formally elected on 25 April. Her time as leader was long characterized by uncertainty on how to profile the party, and consistent low numbers in opinion polls. Her early attempts to gain votes by adopting tougher positions on immigration and law and order were thwarted when the Moderate Party usurped that space. This was followed by a return to a focus on more traditional Christian Democratic issues, such as healthcare and family politics. At the same time, Busch continued to position the party in a more conservative direction on other issues like the opposition to mosque prayer calls and gender science at preschools. At the same time, she also came under attack from social conservatives inside her own party for participating in the Stockholm Pride Parade.

The Christian Democrats received only 2.9% in a big opinion poll published in May 2018, and the party's fortunes looked bleak. But support quickly grew as the election campaign got underway with the first debate in mid-August. Busch's strong performance in this and other debates was credited in large part for the party's surge in the polls. She ended up leading her party to its best electoral performance in 12 years, finishing well above the 4% threshold. In March 2019, Busch announced that her party was ready to start negotiations with the Sweden Democrats in the Riksdag, making her the first party leader to express a willingness to cooperate with the SD.

=== Minister and Deputy Prime Minister (2022–present) ===
Since 18 October 2022, she is the Minister for Energy as well as Minister for Business and Industry in the Kristersson cabinet. She is also Deputy Prime Minister of Sweden for the same cabinet.

On 27 October 2022, Busch and prime minister Ulf Kristersson announced a SEK 55 billion subsidy compensation in connection to the high increase of power bills, the subsidy will only be paid out in the energy price zones three and four in the southern parts of Sweden.

In September 2024 the Government announced subsidies to municipalities willing to construct new land based wind farms. Busch also announced that money would be put aside to develop ways to store energy.

== Political views ==
=== Migration ===
When interviewed by Dagens Nyheter in February 2018, Busch claimed that immigration to Sweden has led to a crisis regarding values and later on, ahead of the 2018 Swedish general election, said that heading towards multiculturalism is a mistake and argued against it.

Busch reiterated her party's new harsher stance on immigration in 2019 in an article co-written with her party's spokesperson on migration, Hans Eklind. They wrote that they consider it necessary to decrease the number of grants of asylum in Sweden to a level similar to that observed in other neighboring countries; this, they claim, would result in a much lower level of immigration. Busch has also criticized the shift towards multiculturalism.

During a party debate in 2016, Busch said that asylum seekers who commit sexual harassment must be rejected and must be deported with a hint that the government accepted the abuse.

=== Foreign policy ===
Busch is positive about free trade and supports EU cooperation, but believes that the principle of subsidiarity must be protected and is against increased supranationalism in social matters and giving the EU taxation rights. She argues that Turkish membership in the EU should be rejected.

Busch has criticized former Foreign Minister Margot Wallström's stance towards Israel and handling of the Israeli–Palestinian conflict, claiming that Wallström had been too one-sided and debated for Palestine rather than acting as a diplomat. She backs moving the Swedish embassy in Israel from Tel Aviv to Jerusalem and expressed support for the decision by the Trump administration in 2017 to move the US embassy there. Commenting on the ongoing war in Gaza in August 2025, Busch said that "Israel is doing the entire world a service in trying to neutralize Hamas and in trying to disband Hamas." On 10 September 2025, Busch referred pro-Palestine activists as "barbarians" on X after activists harassed Civil Defense Minister Carl-Oskar Bohlin in Stockholm.

== Personal life ==
In 2013, Ebba Busch married IK Sirius football player Niklas Thor. She has a son, Birger, born in May 2015 and a daughter, Elise, born in February 2017. On 5 December 2019, Busch announced on her Instagram account that she and her husband had filed for divorce. Busch is a member of the Church of Sweden.

In March 2021, a criminal investigation was launched against Busch for grave defamation against the opposing counsel in a legal conflict relating to Busch's purchase of a house. Busch had, in a Facebook post, drawn attention to a criminal conviction the opposing counsel had received 15 years prior. By July, Busch formally admitted guilt, accepting a conviction. The case concluded with her being placed on probation and ordered to pay a fine of SEK 60,000.

== Honours ==
- Recipient of the Commemorative Golden Jubilee Medal of His Majesty The King (15 September 2023)
- Grand Officer of the Order of the Legion of Honour (30 January 2024)

Political offices
Preceded by -	Municipal Commissioner for Christian Democrats in Uppsala Municipality; 2010–2015	Succeeded by Jonas Segersam
Preceded by Morgan Johansson	Deputy Prime Minister of Sweden; 2022–present	Incumbent
Preceded by Khashayar Farmanbar	Minister for Energy; 2022–present	Incumbent
Preceded by Karl-Petter Thorwaldsson	Minister for Business, Industry and Innovation; 2022–present	Incumbent
Party political offices
Preceded by Göran Hägglund	Leader of the Christian Democrats; 2015–present	Incumbent
Order of precedence
Preceded by Svante Lindqvist as former Marshal of the Realm	Swedish order of precedence as Deputy Prime Minister	Succeeded by Government ministers
