= Niklas Thor =

Swedish footballer

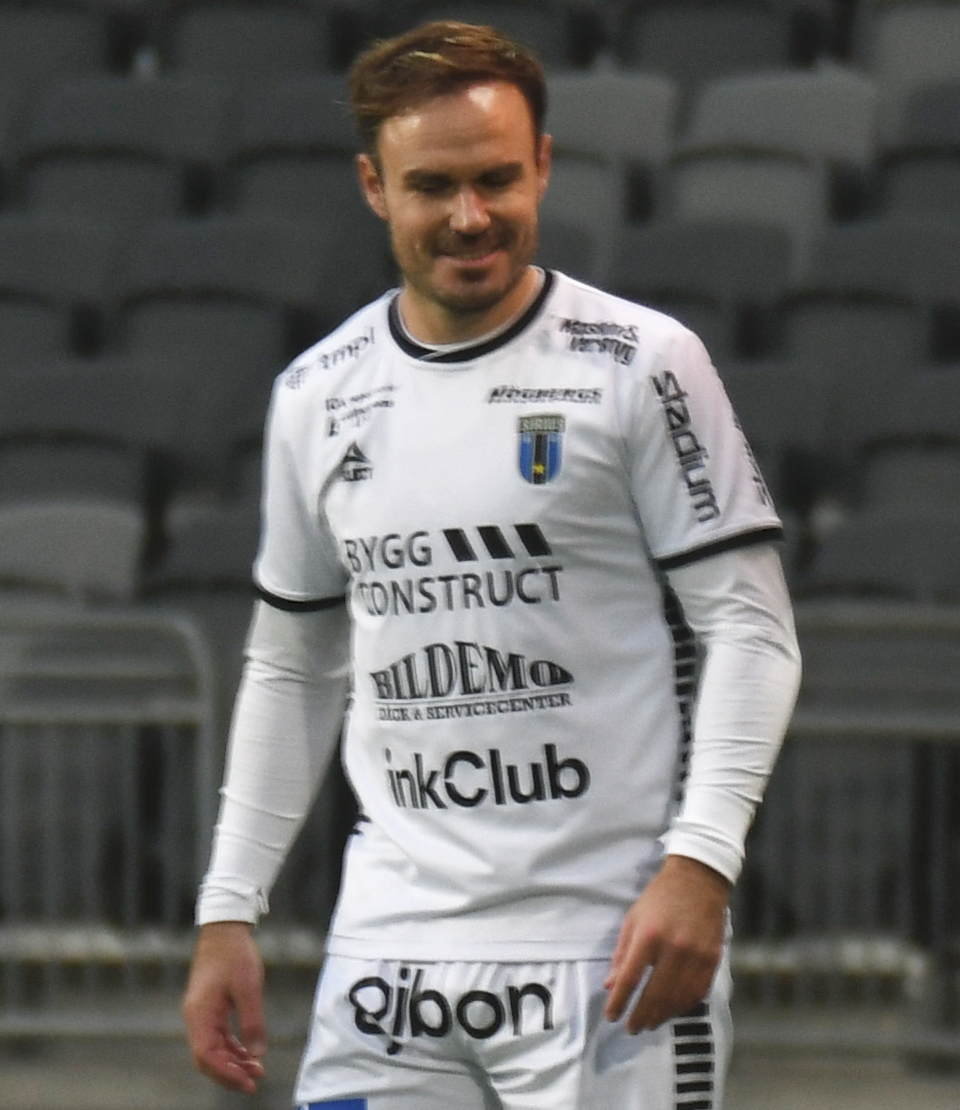
- Niklas Thor during playing an October 2020 Fotbollsallsvenskan away game for IK Sirius against Djurgårdens IF

Personal information
- Full name: Niklas Thor
- Date of birth: 21 February 1986 (age 40)
- Position: Midfielder

Youth career
- Storvreta IK
- IK Sirius
- IFK Norrköping

Senior career*
Years	Team	Apps	(Gls)
2006–2010	Gamla Upsala	61	(5)
2011–2013	Frej	67	(11)
2014–2020	Sirius	139	(7)
2021	Hammarby TFF	7	(0)
- * Club domestic league appearances and goals as of 22 November 2021

Niklas Birger Thor (born 21 February 1986) is a Swedish former professional footballer who played as a midfielder. He was commonly known as Niklas Thor or, during his marriage to Swedish politician Ebba Busch, Niklas Busch Thor.

== Career ==
Thor took a football high school program at Ebersteinska gymnasiet in Norrköping, Östergötland County. During his time in high school, Thor played for IFK Norrköping and IF Sylvia. After graduating high school, he moved to Uppsala, Uppsala County where he played for his mother club Storvreta IK. Seven years later, in late 2013, he signed a two-year deal with IK Sirius in Sweden's second highest league, Superettan. On 25 May 2021, Thor joined Hammarby TFF.

== Personal life ==
Thor married Swedish politician Ebba Busch in 2013: they used the common name of Busch Thor. Thor and Busch filed for divorce in December 2019. They have a son, Birger, born in May 2015 and a daughter, Elise, born in February 2017. Ebba Busch Thor was elected Leader of the Christian Democrats in April 2015 and was then the youngest party leader of all major parties.

Besides football, Thor studies engineering at the Royal Institute of Technology.
