= Minister for Energy (Sweden) =

Swedish cabinet minister

- Energiminister
- Lesser coat of arms of Sweden

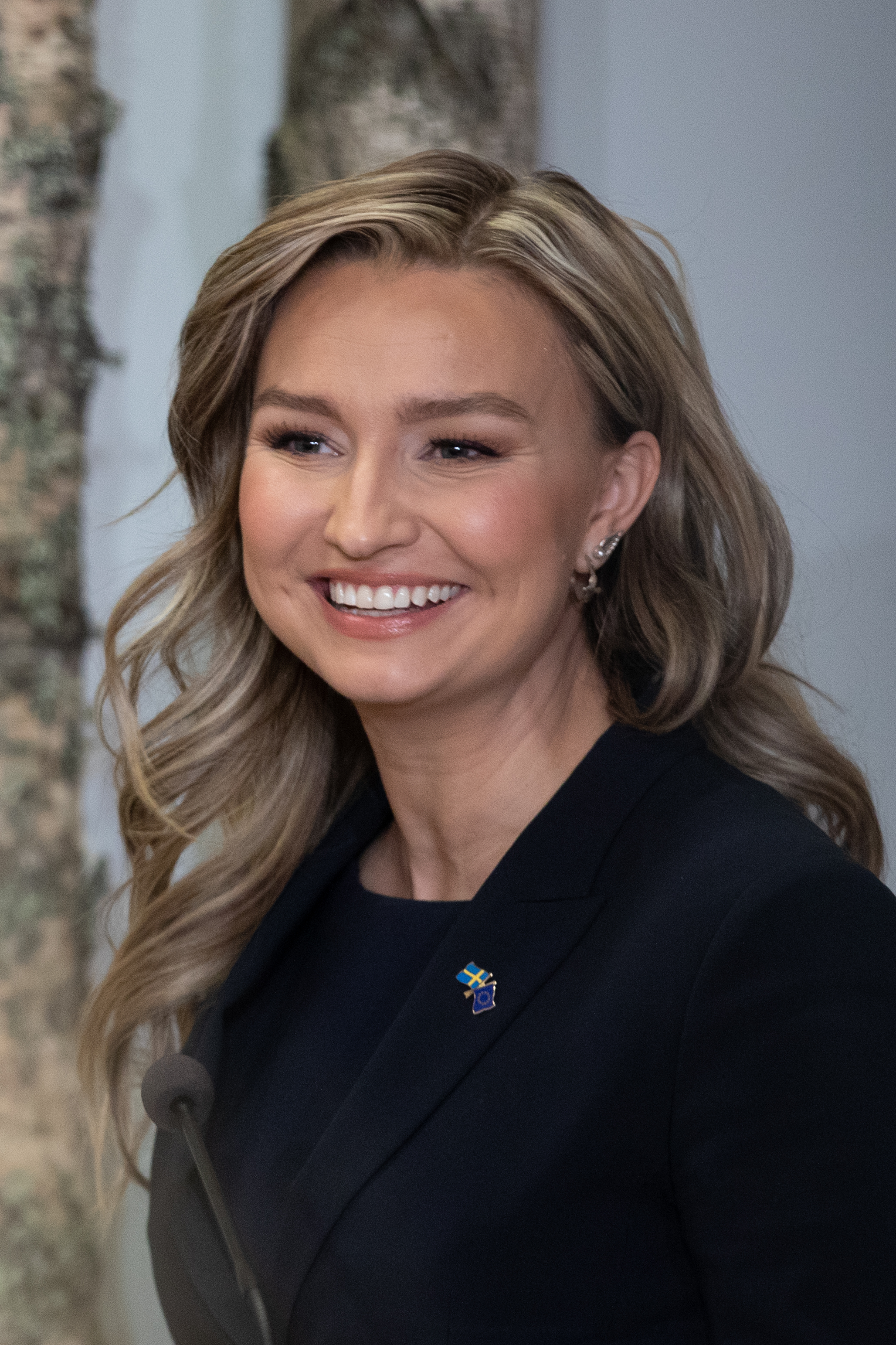
- Incumbent; Ebba Busch since 18 October 2022
- Appointer: The Prime Minister
- Inaugural holder: Olof Johansson (1976); Maud Olofsson (2006)
- Formation: First formation: 1976; Reformation: 2006
- Website: regeringen.se/sb/d/13481/a/199104

The Minister for Energy (Swedish: Energiminister) is a cabinet minister within the Government of Sweden and appointed by the Prime Minister of Sweden.

The minister is responsible for issues regarding energy, the energy market and the development of renewable energy. The current minister for energy is Ebba Busch, appointed on 18 October 2022.

== List of ministers for energy ==
Color key

Independent Social Democrats Moderate Centre Left Liberals Christian Democrats Green Sweden Democrats

Status

Denotes acting Minister for Energy

Portrait	Minister for Energy (Born-Died)	Term			Political party	Coalition	Cabinet
Portrait	Minister for Energy (Born-Died)	Took office	Left office	Duration	Political party	Coalition	Cabinet
Olof Johansson	Olof Johansson (born 1937)	8 October 1976	18 October 1978	2 years, 10 days	Centre	C–M–L	Fälldin I
Carl Tham	Carl Tham (born 1939)	18 October 1978	12 October 1979	359 days	Liberals	L	Ullsten
Carl Axel Petri	Carl Axel Petri (1929–2017)	6 November 1979	22 May 1981	1 year, 197 days	Independent	C–M–L	Fälldin II
Ingemar Eliasson	Ingemar Eliasson (born 1939)	22 May 1981	8 October 1982	1 year, 139 days	Liberals	C–L	Fälldin III
Birgitta Dahl	Birgitta Dahl (1937–2024)	8 October 1982	27 February 1990	7 years, 142 days	Social Democrats	S	Palme II; Carlsson I
Rune Molin	Rune Molin (1931–2011)	27 February 1990	4 October 1991	1 year, 219 days	Social Democrats	S	Carlsson II
Maud Olofsson	Maud Olofsson (born 1955)	6 October 2006	29 September 2011	4 years, 358 days	Centre	M–C–L–KD	Reinfeldt
Anna-Karin Hatt	Anna-Karin Hatt (born 1972)	29 September 2011	3 October 2014	3 years, 4 days	Centre	M–C–L–KD	Reinfeldt
Ibrahim Baylan	Ibrahim Baylan (born 1972)	3 October 2014	21 January 2019	4 years, 110 days	Social Democrats	S–MP	Löfven I
Anders Ygeman	Anders Ygeman (born 1970)	21 January 2019	30 November 2021	2 years, 313 days	Social Democrats	S–MP	Löfven II; Löfven III
Khashayar Farmanbar	Khashayar Farmanbar (born 1976)	30 November 2021	18 October 2022	322 days	Social Democrats	S	Andersson
Ebba Busch	Ebba Busch (born 1987)	18 October 2022	Incumbent	3 years, 324 days	Christian Democrats	M–KD–L	Kristersson

== See also ==
- Energy law
