= Anders Ygeman =

Swedish politician (born 1970)

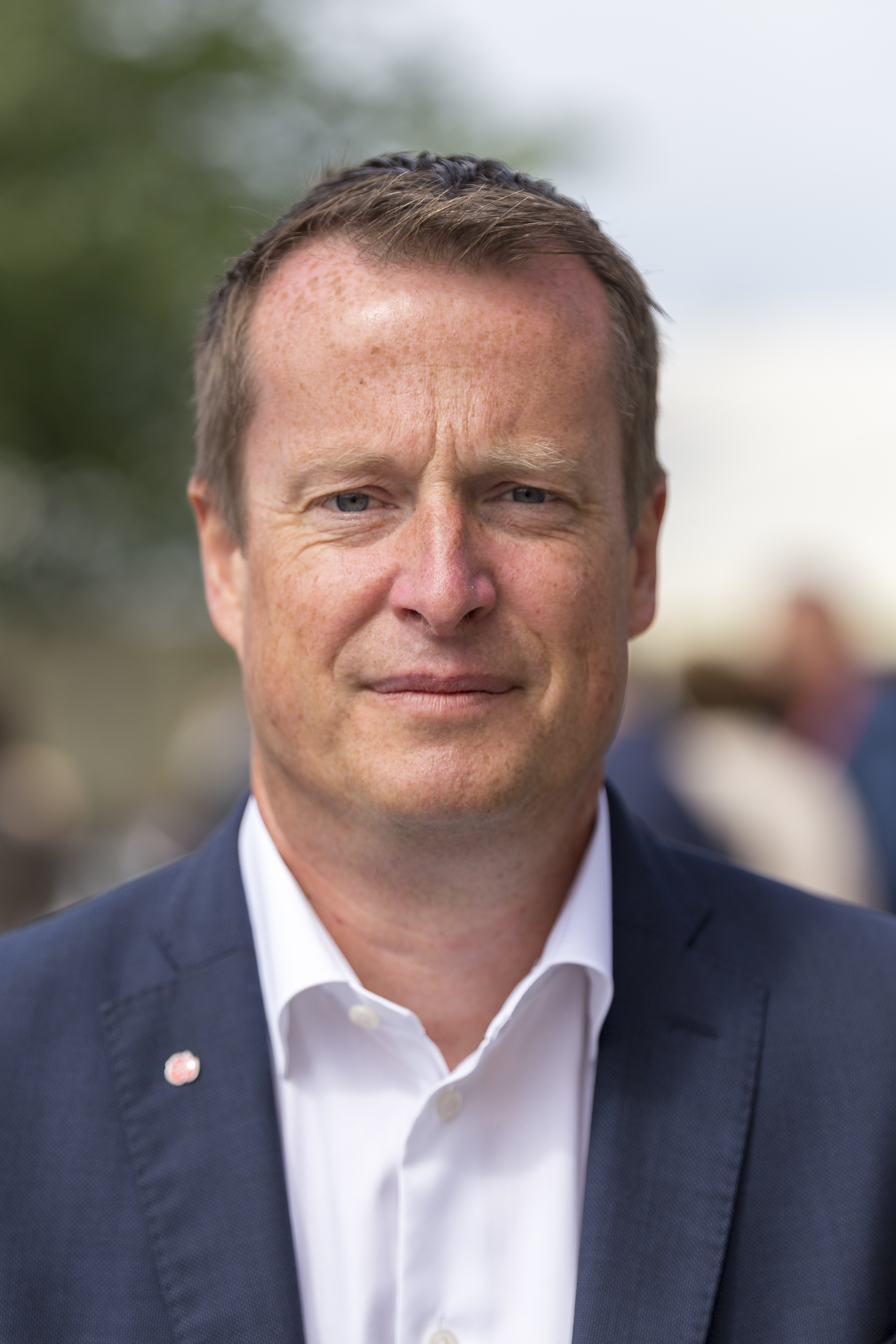
- Ygeman during the Almedalen week in 2016.

Minister for Migration and Asylum Policy
- In office 30 November 2021 – 17 October 2022
- Prime Minister: Magdalena Andersson
- Preceded by: Morgan Johansson
- Succeeded by: Maria Malmer Stenergard

Minister for Integration
- In office 30 November 2021 – 17 October 2022
- Prime Minister: Magdalena Andersson
- Preceded by: Erik Ullenhag (2014)
- Succeeded by: Johan Pehrson

Minister for Sports
- In office 30 November 2021 – 17 October 2022
- Prime Minister: Magdalena Andersson
- Preceded by: Amanda Lind
- Succeeded by: Jakob Forssmed

Minister for Energy
- In office 21 January 2019 – 30 November 2021
- Prime Minister: Stefan Löfven
- Preceded by: Ibrahim Baylan
- Succeeded by: Khashayar Farmanbar

Minister for Digital Development
- In office 21 January 2019 – 30 November 2021
- Prime Minister: Stefan Löfven
- Preceded by: Peter Eriksson
- Succeeded by: Khashayar Farmanbar

Parliamentary Group Leader of the Social Democratic Party in the Riksdag
- In office 27 July 2017 – 21 January 2019
- Prime Minister: Stefan Löfven
- Preceded by: Tomas Eneroth
- Succeeded by: Annelie Karlsson

Minister for Home Affairs
- In office 3 October 2014 – 27 July 2017
- Prime Minister: Stefan Löfven
- Preceded by: Office created
- Succeeded by: Morgan Johansson

Member of the Riksdag
- Incumbent
- Assumed office 1 October 1996

Personal details
- Born: 17 June 1970 (age 56) Stockholm, Sweden
- Party: Social Democratic
- Spouse: Elisabeth Brandt-Ygeman
- Children: 2
- Profession: Politician

Anders Ingvar Ygeman (Swedish: [ˈânːdɛʂ ˈŷːɡɛˌman]; born 17 June 1970) is a Swedish politician of the Social Democrats. He has served as Minister for Migration and Asylum Policy, Minister for Integration and Minister for Sports between November 2021 and October 2022. He previously served in the Swedish Government as Minister for Energy and Minister for Digital Development from 2019 to 2021 and as Minister for Home Affairs from 2014 to 2017. He has been a member of the Riksdag since 1996 (as a standby since 1995).

== Biography ==
Ygeman grew up in Hagsätra and lived in Årsta, Stockholm. He is the son of journalist Ingvar Ygeman. In 1990, Ygeman studied criminology at Stockholm University for one semester, but dropped out without a degree.

Anders Ygeman was liberated in 1990 from execution of military service. He has commented on his military training as following words: "I pulled in, but quickly moved out. After five days I requested a weapon-free service. Basically, I'm probably quite a pacifist." Ygeman was the chairman of SSU of Stockholm in 1992-1996 and Deputy Chairman of the SSU in 1995-1997.

Ygeman has been a parliamentarian since 1996.

He is married to Elisabeth Brandt-Ygeman and together they have two children.

== Career ==
=== Minister for Home Affairs (2014-2017) ===
When the Löfven Cabinet started after the 2014 Swedish general election, Ygeman was appointed minister for home affairs. In the former Reinfeldt Cabinet, such a position did not exist. After the Charlie Hebdo shooting (6 January 2015) and the November 2015 attacks (both in Paris), Homeland security themes have gained importance. It is also a part of Sweden's domestic policy to cope with the European migrant crisis affecting Sweden.

After the terrorist attacks in Paris in November 2015, Ygeman presented a cross-border and anti-terrorism agreement. Among other things, the package included the criminalization of terrorist voyages, the end of the abuse of Swedish passports, the measures against illegal weapons and increased penalties for hand grenades and explosives, the investigation of secret data readings, and the possibility of sharing digital information for FRA, MUST and SÄPO at the National Center for Terrorism Assessments.

On 26 July 2017, a majority in the Riksdag announced they would put forward a vote of confidence against him. On 27 July 2017, he resigned from the cabinet. Subsequently, he was appointed Leader of the Social Democrats in the Swedish Riksdag.

=== Chairman of the Social Democrats in Stockholm (2016– ) ===
On 11 September 2016, Anders Ygeman was elected as a new chairman of the Social Democrats in Stockholm after Veronica Palm. Ygeman was elected by a unanimous extraordinary annual meeting. Anders Ygeman represents Stockholm in the Riksdag since 1995. As the chairman of the Social Democrats in Stockholm, he is given responsibility to lead and develop politics and the organization.
