= Kristersson cabinet =

Incumbent government of Sweden

Ulf Kristersson cabinet
- 57th Cabinet of Sweden
- incumbent
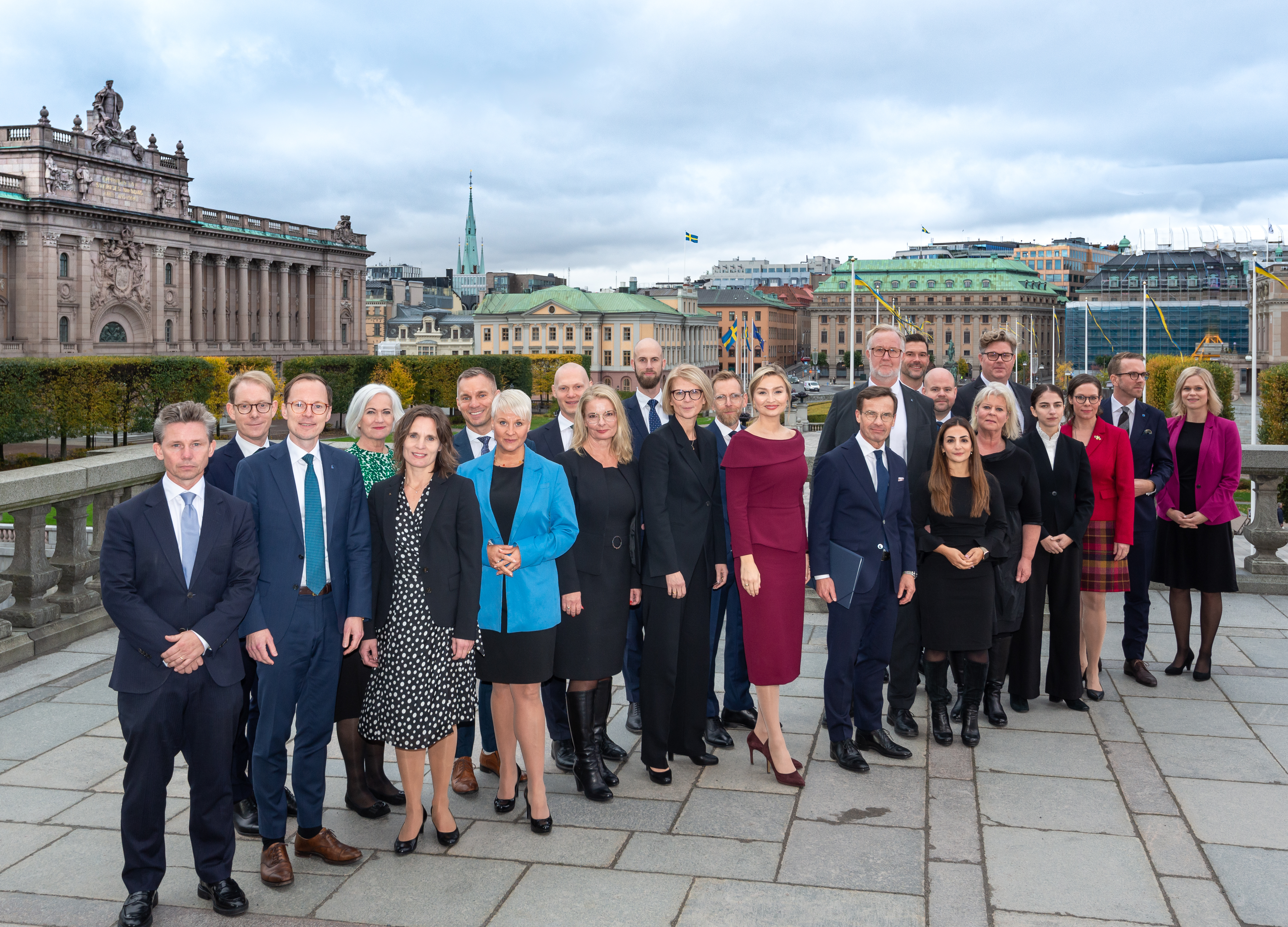
- Ministers gathered at Lejonbacken after meeting with the King
- Date formed: 18 October 2022

People and organisations
- Head of state: Carl XVI Gustaf
- Head of government: Ulf Kristersson
- Deputy head of government: Ebba Busch (KD)
- No. of ministers: 24
- Member parties: Moderate Party; Christian Democrats; Liberals
- Status in legislature: Coalition minority with confidence and supply from Sweden Democrats
- Opposition parties: Social Democrats; Left Party; Centre Party; Green Party
- Opposition leader: Magdalena Andersson (S)

History
- Incoming formation: 2022 election
- Elections: 2022 election 2026 election
- Legislature terms: 2022–2026
- Predecessor: Andersson cabinet

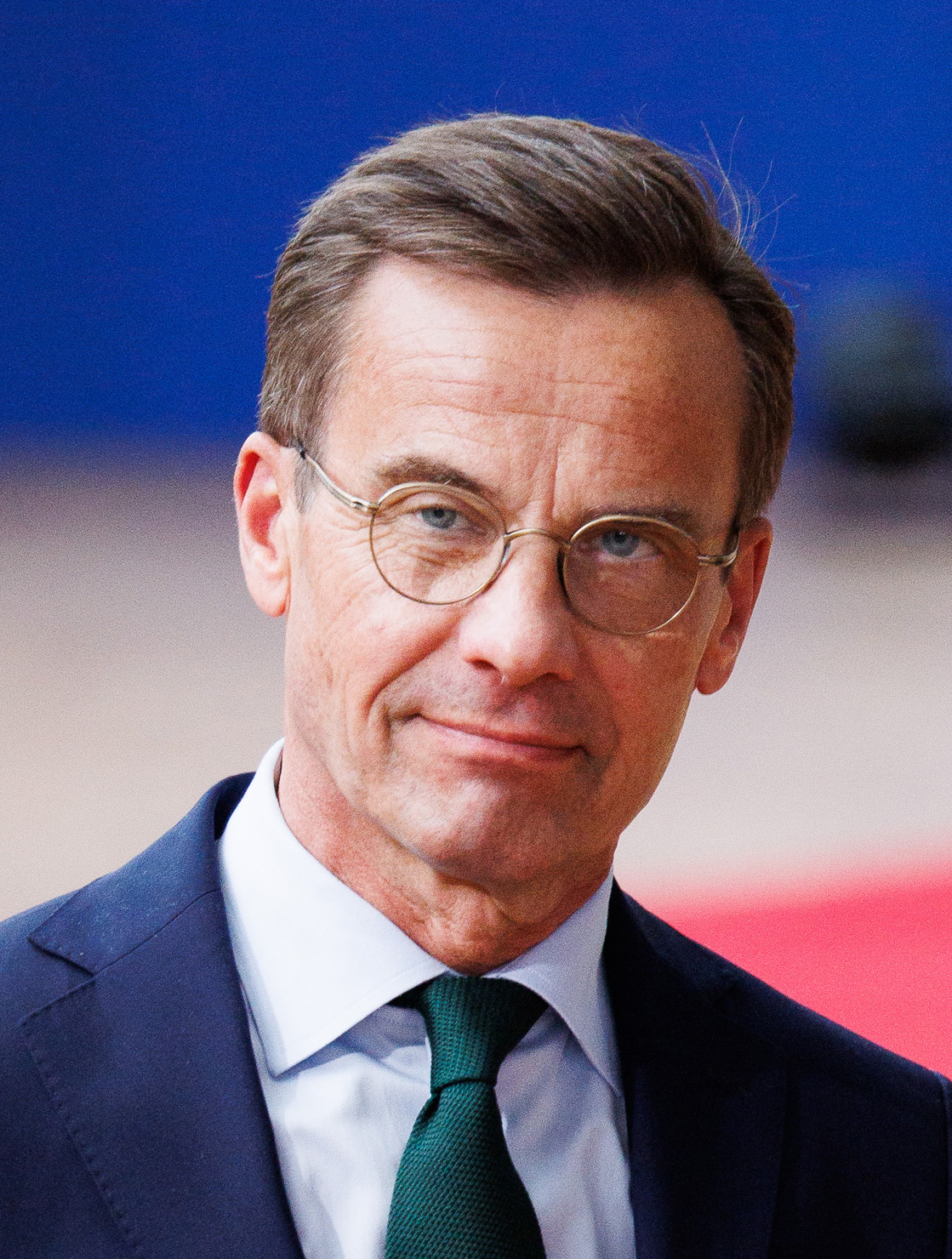
Prime Minister Ulf Kristersson.

The Kristersson cabinet (Swedish: regeringen Kristersson) is since 18 October 2022 the 57th government of Sweden, and is led by Ulf Kristersson, leader of the Moderate Party. It is a coalition minority government consisting of three parties: the Moderate Party, the Christian Democrats, and the Liberals. The cabinet works closely with the Sweden Democrats, in accordance with the Tidö Agreement backed by a majority in the Riksdag.

The cabinet was installed following the 2022 general election. On 17 September 2026, following a defeat in the 2026 general election, Kristersson asked to be dismissed as prime minister and the cabinet became a caretaker government.

== Formation ==
In the 2022 Swedish general election, the right-wing parliamentary faction consisting of the Sweden Democrats, the Moderate Party, the Christian Democrats, and the Liberals won a slim majority of 176 out of 349 seats. Following a month of negotiations, the Tidö Agreement was signed between the parties. Along with a list of common reforms, the agreement stipulates the parties' intention to govern as a coalition, with the confidence and supply from the Sweden Democrats.

On 17 October 2022, Kristersson was elected Prime Minister of Sweden by the Riksdag following a 176–173 vote. It is the first time the Sweden Democrats exert direct government influence. Some European Union lawmakers criticised the centre-right and the Moderate Party in particular, as a member of the European People's Party, for allying with the far-right, as did Swedish opposition leaders.

The next day a special council was held at the Royal Palace to mark the formal accession of the new government and King Carl XVI Gustaf, who chaired the meeting, confirmed that a change of government had taken place.

== Ministers ==
Below are the cabinet members listed.

Portfolio	Minister	Took office	Left office	Party
Prime Minister's Office
Prime Minister	Ulf Kristersson	18 October 2022	Incumbent	Moderate
Deputy Prime Minister (Note: Not a separate minister post)	Ebba Busch	18 October 2022	Incumbent	Christian Democrats
Minister for EU Affairs; Minister for Nordic Cooperation	Jessika Roswall	18 October 2022	10 September 2024	Moderate
Minister for EU Affairs; Minister for Nordic Cooperation	Jessica Rosencrantz	10 September 2024	Incumbent	Moderate
Ministry of Justice
Minister for Justice	Gunnar Strömmer	18 October 2022	Incumbent	Moderate
Minister for Migration	Maria Malmer Stenergard	18 October 2022	10 September 2024	Moderate
Minister for Migration	Johan Forssell	10 September 2024	Incumbent	Moderate
Ministry of Foreign Affairs
Minister for Foreign Affairs	Tobias Billström	18 October 2022	10 September 2024	Moderate
Minister for Foreign Affairs	Maria Malmer Stenergard	10 September 2024	Incumbent	Moderate
Minister of Foreign Trade and International Development Cooperation	Johan Forssell	18 October 2022	10 September 2024	Moderate
Minister of Foreign Trade and International Development Cooperation	Benjamin Dousa	10 September 2024	Incumbent	Moderate
Ministry of Defence
Minister for Defence	Pål Jonson	18 October 2022	Incumbent	Moderate
Minister for Civil Defence	Carl-Oskar Bohlin	18 October 2022	Incumbent	Moderate
Ministry of Health and Social Affairs
Minister for Social Affairs	Jakob Forssmed	18 October 2022	Incumbent	Christian Democrats
Minister for Health	Acko Ankarberg Johansson	18 October 2022	9 September 2025	Christian Democrats
Minister for Health	Elisabet Lann	9 September 2025	Incumbent	Christian Democrats
Minister for Social Services	Camilla Waltersson Grönvall	18 October 2022	Incumbent	Moderate
Minister for Social Security and Pensions	Anna Tenje	18 October 2022	Incumbent	Moderate
Ministry of Finance
Minister for Finance	Elisabeth Svantesson	18 October 2022	Incumbent	Moderate
Minister for Financial Markets	Niklas Wykman	18 October 2022	Incumbent	Moderate
Minister for Public Administration	Erik Slottner	18 October 2022	Incumbent	Christian Democrats
Ministry of Education and Research
Minister for Education	Mats Persson	18 October 2022	10 September 2024	Liberals
Minister for Education	Johan Pehrson	10 September 2024	28 June 2025	Liberals
Minister for Education and Integration	Simona Mohamsson	28 June 2025	Incumbent	Liberals
Minister for Schools	Lotta Edholm	18 October 2022	25 June 2025	Liberals
Minister for Upper Secondary School, Higher Education and Research	Lotta Edholm	25 June 2025	Incumbent	Liberals
Ministry of the Environment, Enterprise and Innovation
Minister for Energy and Enterprise	Ebba Busch	18 October 2022	Incumbent	Christian Democrats
Minister for the Environment	Romina Pourmokhtari	18 October 2022	Incumbent	Liberals
Ministry of Culture
Minister for Culture	Parisa Liljestrand	18 October 2022	Incumbent	Moderate
Ministry of Employment
Minister for Employment and for Integration	Johan Pehrson	18 October 2022	10 September 2024	Liberals
Minister for Employment and for Integration	Mats Persson	10 September 2024	28 June 2025	Liberals
Minister for Employment	Johan Britz	28 June 2025	Incumbent	Liberals
Minister for Gender Equality	Paulina Brandberg	18 October 2022	1 April 2025	Liberals
Minister for Gender Equality	Nina Larsson	1 April 2025	Incumbent	Liberals
Ministry of Rural Affairs and Infrastructure
Minister for Rural Affairs	Peter Kullgren	18 October 2022	Incumbent	Christian Democrats
Minister for Infrastructure and for Housing	Andreas Carlson	18 October 2022	Incumbent	Christian Democrats

== Party breakdown ==
Party breakdown of cabinet ministers:

- Moderate Party
13
- Christian Democrats
6
- Liberals
5

== Policy ==
The government based their politics on the Tidö Agreement. A specific policy manifesto was presented when Kristersson held his declaration of government (regeringsförklaring) on 18 October 2022.

== Notes ==
Preceded by Andersson cabinet	Cabinet of Sweden; 2022–	Incumbent
