= Ministry of the Environment (Sweden) =

Coordinates: 59°19′48.3″N 18°04′01.6″E

- Miljödepartementet

Agency overview
- Formed: 1 January 1987
- Dissolved: 31 December 2022
- Superseding agency: Ministry of Climate and Enterprise
- Headquarters: Stockholm, Sweden
- Minister responsible: Minister for the Environment
- Parent agency: Government Offices

The Ministry of the Environment (Swedish: Miljödepartementet) was a ministry within the Government of Sweden. It operated between 1987 and 2022.

The ministry was merged into the Ministry of Enterprise and Innovation, forming the Ministry of Climate and Enterprise on 1 January 2023.

== History ==
The ministry was founded in 1987 as the Ministry of the Environment and Energy (Swedish: Miljö- och energidepartementet). Previously environmental issues had been handled by the Ministry of Agriculture (Swedish: Jordbruksdepartementet) and energy issues had been handled by the Ministry of Industry. In 1990, the short form name of Ministry of the Environment was used, and energy issues transferred back to the Ministry of Industry, although supervision of nuclear energy was retained. In 1991, the ministry was renamed to the Ministry of the Environment and Natural Resources (Swedish: Miljö- och naturresursdepartementet).

From 1 January 2005, during the Persson cabinet, the ministry was known as the Ministry of Sustainable Development (Swedish: Miljö- och samhällsbyggnadsdepartementet). The cabinet of Fredrik Reinfeldt — which took office on 6 October 2006 — used the short form name again, transferred energy issues to the Ministry of Enterprise, Energy and Communications, and housing issues were transferred to the Ministry of Finance. In 2014, the ministry reverted to its original name under the cabinet of Stefan Löfven. Under the second cabinet of Stefan Löfven the ministry changed name to Ministry of the Environment (Swedish: Miljödepartementet).

Following the election of the Government of Ulf Kristersson in October 2022, the ministry were merged into the Ministry of Enterprise and Innovation, which then changed name to the Ministry of Climate and Enterprise.

== See also ==
- List of ministers for the environment
