= Magdalena Andersson =

Prime Minister of Sweden from 2021 to 2022

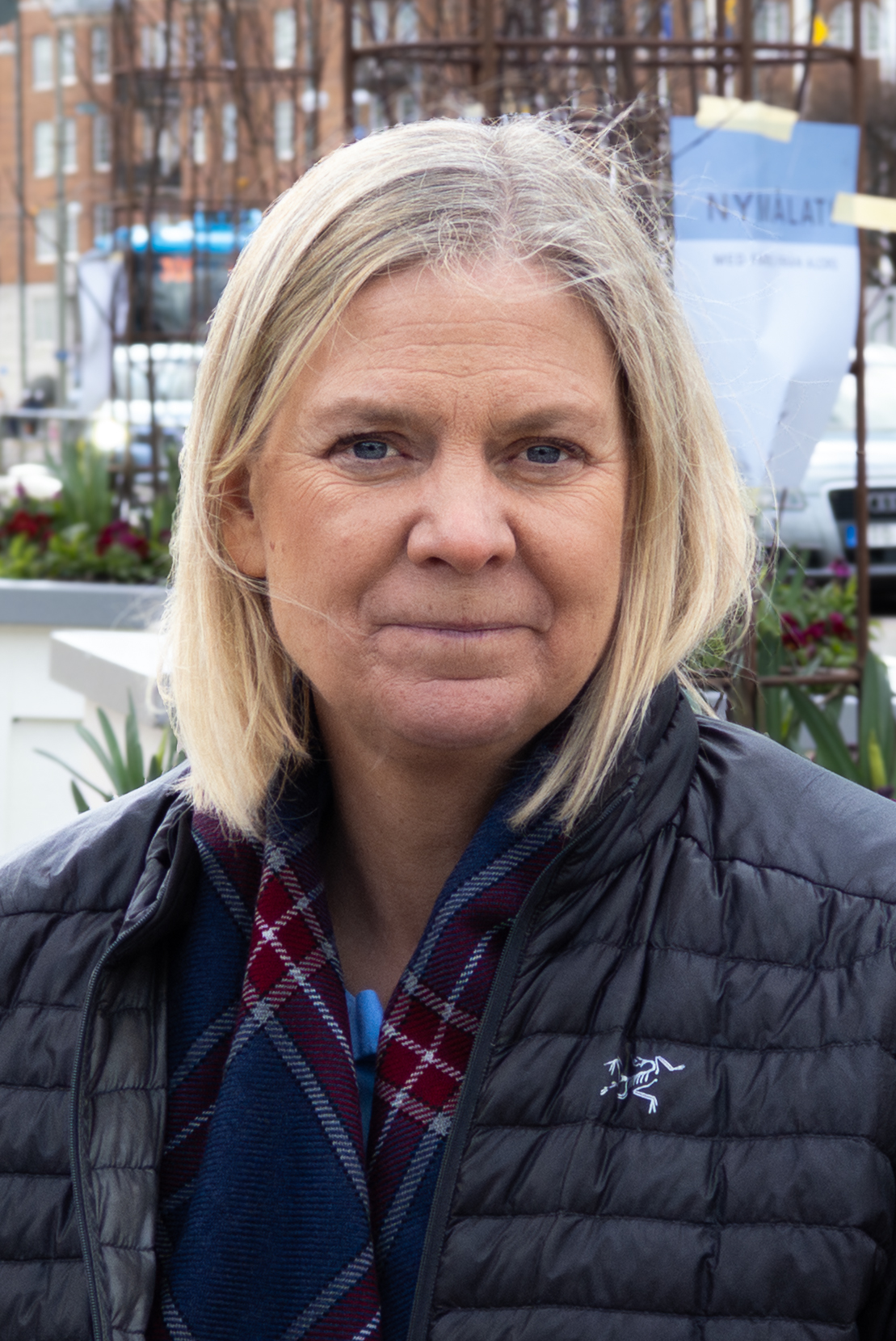
- Andersson in 2026

Leader of the Opposition
- Incumbent
- Assumed office 18 October 2022
- Monarch: Carl XVI Gustaf
- Prime Minister: Ulf Kristersson
- Preceded by: Ulf Kristersson

Prime Minister of Sweden
- In office 30 November 2021 – 18 October 2022
- Monarch: Carl XVI Gustaf
- Deputy: Morgan Johansson
- Preceded by: Stefan Löfven
- Succeeded by: Ulf Kristersson

Leader of the Social Democratic Party
- Incumbent
- Assumed office 4 November 2021
- Secretary General: Tobias Baudin
- Preceded by: Stefan Löfven

Minister for Finance
- In office 3 October 2014 – 30 November 2021
- Prime Minister: Stefan Löfven
- Preceded by: Anders Borg
- Succeeded by: Mikael Damberg

Chair of the International Monetary and Financial Committee
- In office 17 December 2020 – 3 January 2022
- Managing Director: Kristalina Georgieva
- Preceded by: Lesetja Kganyago
- Succeeded by: Nadia Calviño

Member of the Riksdag
- Incumbent
- Assumed office 29 September 2014
- Constituency: Stockholm County

Personal details
- Born: Eva Magdalena Andersson; 23 January 1967 (age 59) Uppsala, Sweden
- Party: Social Democratic
- Spouse: Richard Friberg (m. 1997)
- Children: 2
- Education: Stockholm School of Economics (MSc)
- Cabinet: Andersson’s cabinet

Eva Magdalena Andersson (born 23 January 1967) is a Swedish politician and economist who has served as Leader of the Opposition since 2022 and as Leader of the Swedish Social Democratic Party since 2021. She has served as a Member of the Riksdag for Stockholm County since 2014. She previously served as the first female Prime Minister of Sweden from 2021 to 2022, as well as Minister for Finance from 2014 to 2021 and Chair of the International Monetary and Financial Committee from 2020 to 2022.

Andersson joined the Swedish Social Democratic Youth League in 1983. In 1992, she earned a master's degree in economics from the Stockholm School of Economics. She has served as an adviser and director of planning in Göran Persson's administration and as an adviser to Mona Sahlin. After the 2014 Swedish general election, Andersson was elected to the Riksdag and became Minister for Finance in Stefan Löfven's administration. When Löfven announced his plans to step down in August 2021, she was regarded as the main candidate to succeed him. Soon after that, she was elected leader of the Social Democrats.

Andersson was elected Prime Minister of Sweden by the Riksdag on 29 November 2021. On 24 November 2021, Andersson had been elected to that position but resigned after an announcement by her coalition partner, the Green Party, that they were leaving the government in response to losing the annual budget vote in the Riksdag to the conservative opposition. Andersson then assumed the office of Prime Minister on 30 November 2021 as Sweden's first female prime minister.

After her coalition lost its majority in the 2022 Swedish general election, Andersson announced her intention to resign as prime minister. She was succeeded by Ulf Kristersson on 18 October the same year.

Following the 2026 Swedish general election, Andersson was tasked by the Speaker of the Riksdag on 18 September 2026 with forming a new government after Ulf Kristersson resigned following the defeat of his governing coalition. If successful, Andersson would return as Prime Minister of Sweden.

== Early life and education ==
Andersson is the only child of Göran Andersson (1934–2002), a lecturer in statistics at Uppsala University, and teacher Birgitta Andersson (née Grunell; born 1939). Andersson was an elite swimmer in her youth.

In her primary school years, she attended Malmaskolan in the outskirts of Uppsala, in an area called Norby. During her high school years, Andersson studied social sciences at Katedralskolan in Uppsala. She graduated in 1987 with top grades in all but one class.

After graduating from high school, Andersson moved to Stockholm to study at the Stockholm School of Economics, where she graduated in 1992 with a master's degree in economics. She started her doctorate in economics at the Stockholm School of Economics from 1992 to 1995, but ended before completing the degree. As part of her doctoral studies, she studied abroad at the Institute of Advanced Studies in Vienna during autumn 1994 and at Harvard University during spring 1995.

Andersson joined the Swedish Social Democratic Youth League (SSU) in 1983 during her first year of secondary school. In 1987, she was elected president of the Uppsala section of SSU.

== Career ==
=== Advisor and civil servant ===
After completing her studies in economics, Andersson was employed in at Rosenbad as a political advisor to the then prime minister Göran Persson from 1996 to 1998, and later served as Director of Planning from 1998 to 2004. She then spent time in the civil service, working as secretary of state in the Ministry of Finance from 2004 to 2006, before leaving to become a political advisor again, this time to opposition leader Mona Sahlin from 2007 to 2009. She left this role when the government nominated her as Chief Director of the Swedish Tax Agency, a position she held until 2012. She resigned when adopted as a Swedish Social Democratic Party candidate ahead of the 2014 Swedish general election.

=== Minister for Finance ===
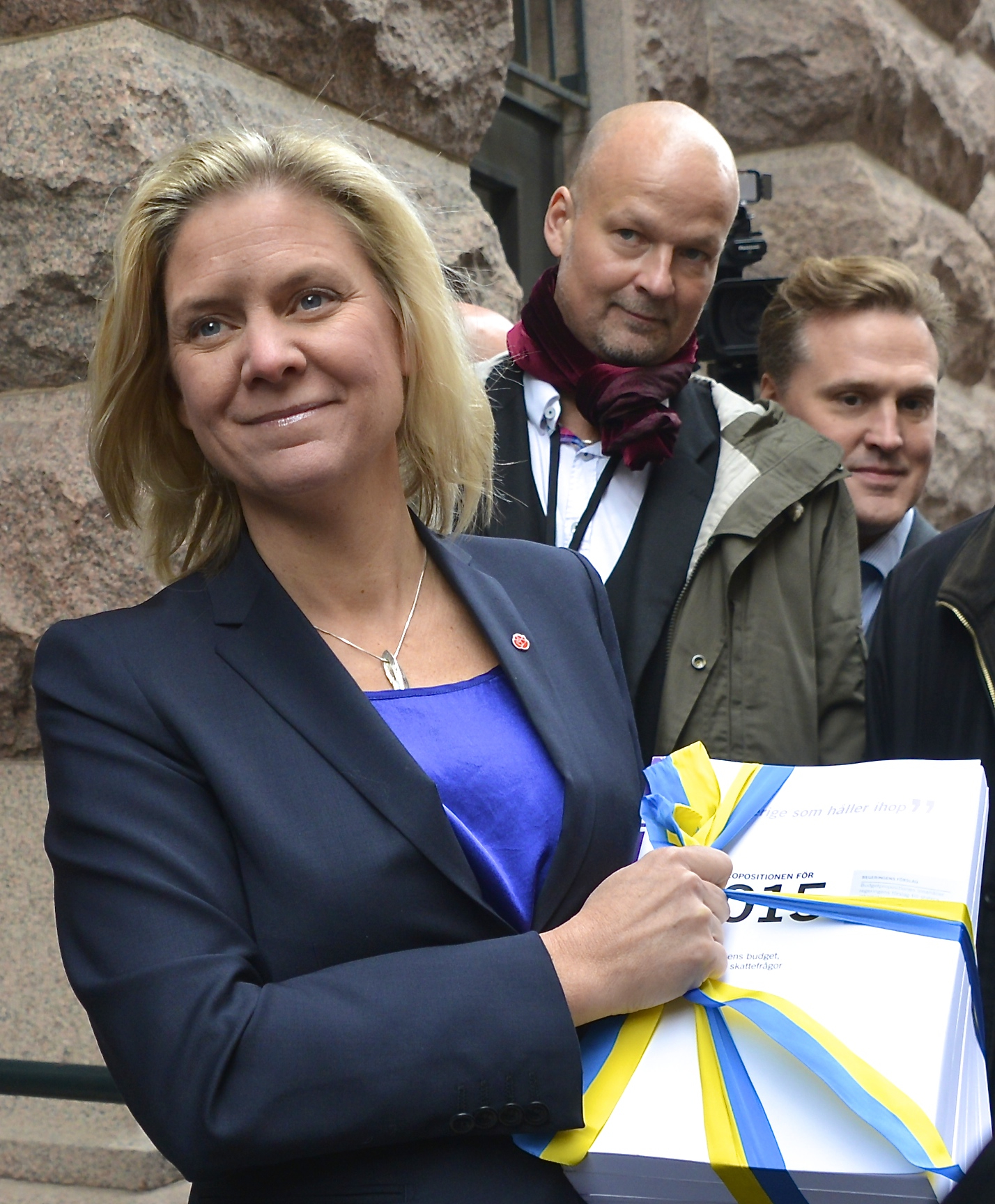
Andersson with her first government budget outside the Parliament House, Stockholm, on 23 October 2014

After the Social Democrats won the 2014 general election in which Andersson was elected as a member of the Riksdag, she was appointed as Minister for Finance by new prime minister Stefan Löfven in his cabinet. As a result of coalition negotiations, while Andersson had overall responsibility for the Finance Ministry, Per Bolund was given responsibility for the oversight of financial markets and consumer protection as Minister for Financial Markets. Andersson was reappointed as finance minister by Löfven following the 2018 Swedish general election.

In 2020, members of the International Monetary and Financial Committee (IMFC), the primary policy advisory committee of the board of governors of the International Monetary Fund (IMF), chose Andersson to serve as chair of IMFC for a term of three years. She became the first European in that role after more than a decade, as well as the first woman to hold that position.

In August 2021, Löfven announced he would resign as party leader at the party congress in November 2021. Andersson was quickly regarded by many as the candidate most likely to succeed him, and on 29 September 2021 the party's nominating committee announced that Andersson had been chosen as leader-designate ahead of the congress; should the designation be accepted by the Riksdag, Andersson would become leader and first female prime minister of Sweden.

=== Leader of the Social Democratic Party ===
Andersson was elected Leader of the Swedish Social Democratic Party on 4 November 2021, becoming the party's second female leader after Mona Sahlin.

On 10 November 2021, the incumbent prime minister Stefan Löfven formally resigned from office. As part of the 2021 Swedish government formation, the speaker of the Riksdag held talks with all party leaders on 11 November and shortly after tasked Andersson with forming a government, giving her one week. On 23 November, it was announced that Andersson had reached an agreement with the Left Party to support her at the upcoming prime ministerial vote. With the Centre Party having previously agreed to support her, Andersson had the support of the required number of MPs to become Sweden's next prime minister.

== Prime Minister of Sweden (2021–2022) ==
=== Confirmation ===
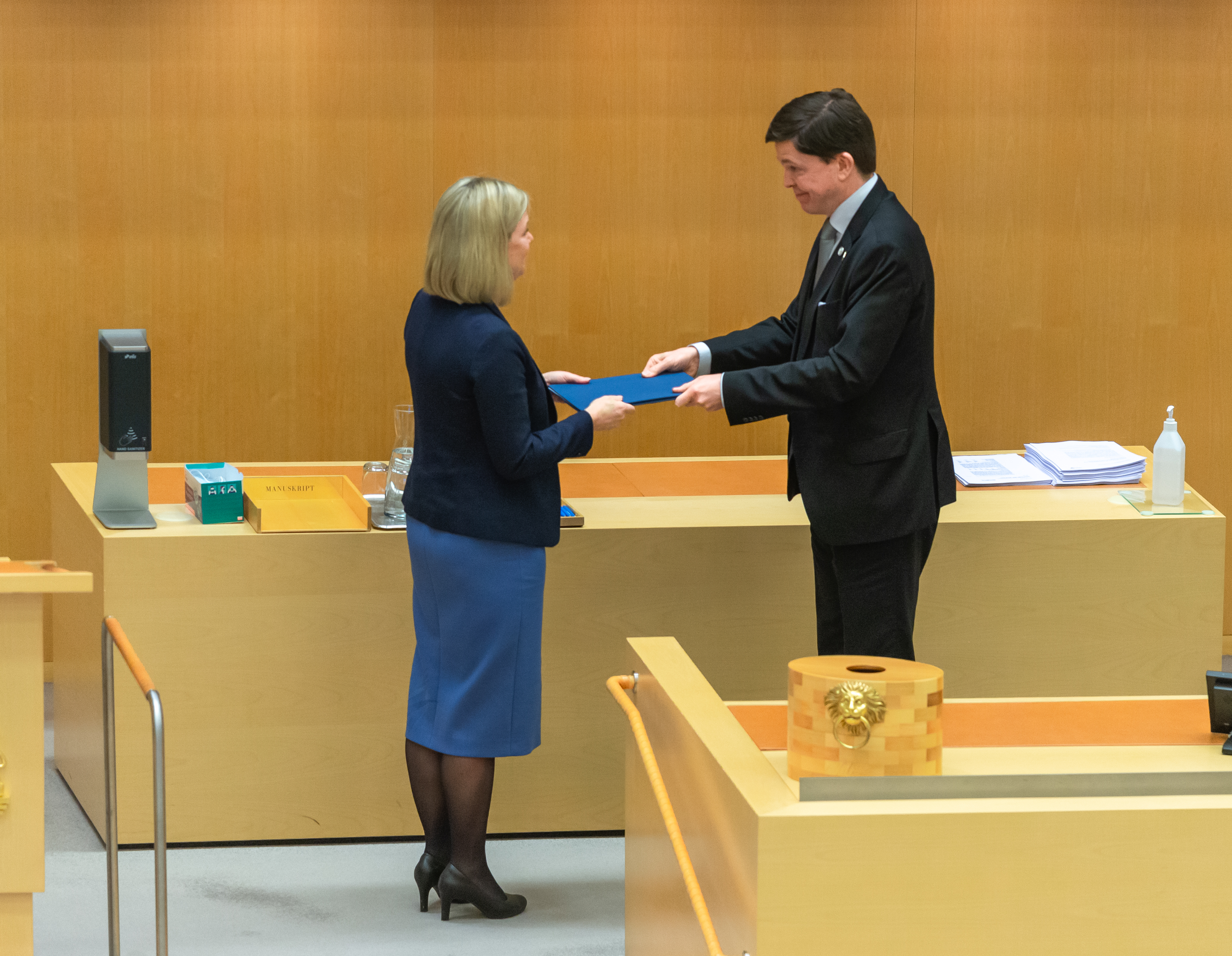
Andersson with Andreas Norlén, Speaker of the Riksdag, after her first election as prime minister

On 24 November 2021, Andersson was elected as the prime minister of Sweden by the Riksdag. At the time of her election, she would have assumed office formally on 26 November. Although she did not receive a majority of yes votes, a majority did not vote against her due to abstentions. Under Sweden's principles of negative parliamentarism, since a majority was not opposed to Andersson's nomination, this was sufficient to elect her prime minister.

A few hours after Andersson's election, her budget was defeated in the Riksdag. The opposition budget passed instead. Since the opposition budget was drafted with the support of the right-wing populist party Sweden Democrats, the Green Party pulled out of the coalition rather than be bound to govern under it, leading Andersson to resign before taking office. This was based on the constitutional convention that a prime minister should resign if a party leaves the governing coalition. She notified Speaker Andreas Norlén that she would be interested in leading a single-party government.

On 29 November, Andersson was elected prime minister again by a narrow margin of two votes. This was expected after all parties that supported her in the first vote (the Centre Party, the Green Party, and the Left Party) indicated their willingness to support her when the Riksdag took another vote. On 30 November, Andersson and her administration formally assumed office when they met in council with King Carl XVI Gustaf and he announced them. Andersson thus became Sweden's first female prime minister, and the country's first female head of government since Queen Ulrika Eleonora of Sweden abdicated in 1720. In her maiden speech as party leader, Andersson said that migrants to Sweden must learn Swedish, work, and graduate high school if they wish to receive welfare. She added that migrant men must let their female relatives work. In 2017, as finance minister, she said that she regretted the government's decision to grant asylum to 160,000 people during the European migrant crisis in 2015, as she believed that there was not enough housing and employment to integrate them.

=== Tenure ===
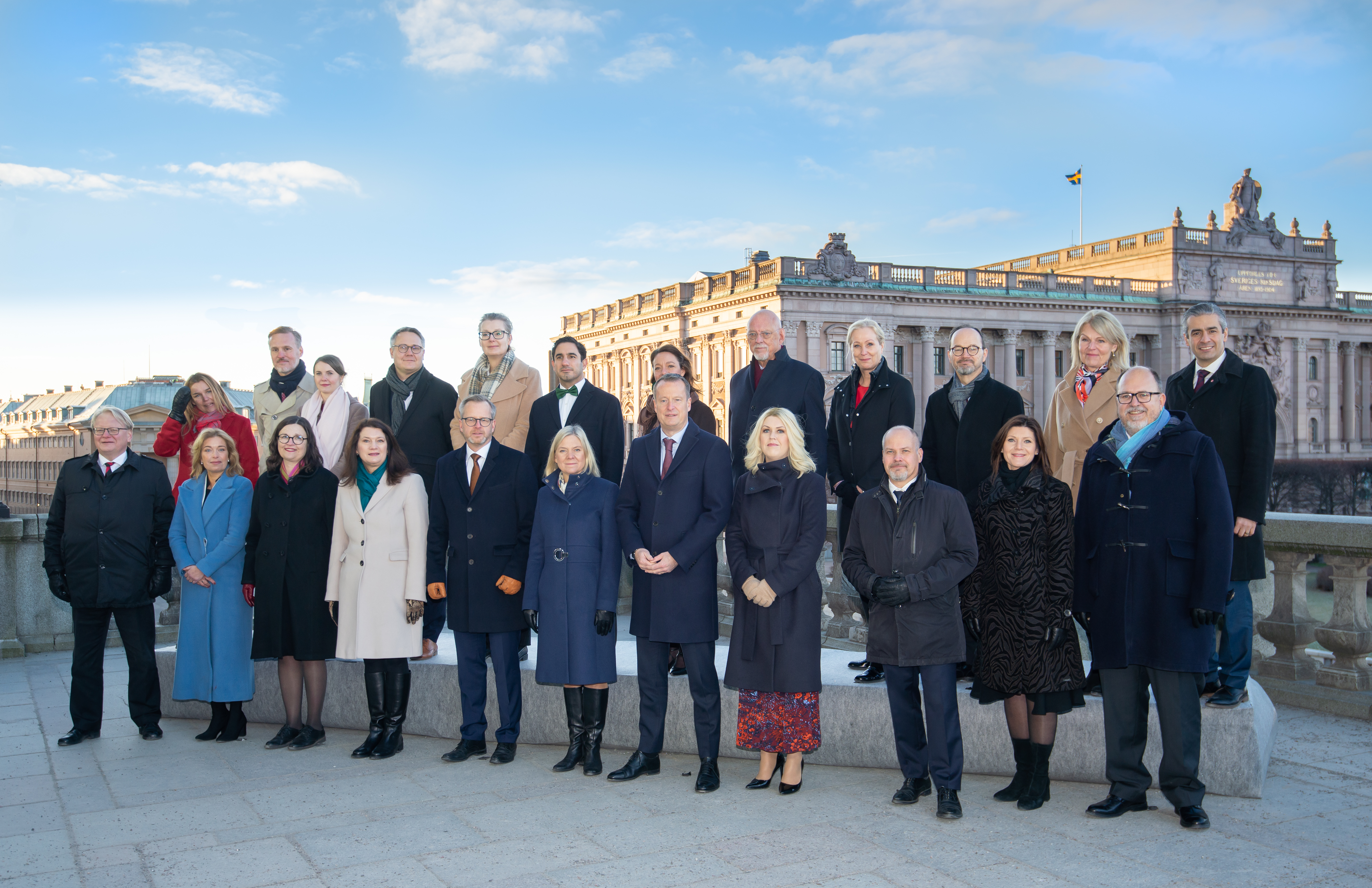
Andersson and her cabinet on 30 November 2021

On 7 December, Andersson and Swedish health authorities announced new measures to contain the COVID-19 pandemic. This included remote work to be made available by employers, adults should keep distance in public spaces, restaurants should avoid congestion, and masks should be used on public transport. Andersson emphasised that it was important for people to be vaccinated, and advised people to "take a break from hugging". On 21 December, Andersson presented new COVID-19 measures. Asked by the press if the new measures would affect her own Christmas celebrations or other plans, Andersson responded that the measures would affect her personally, and that she had to cancel a scheduled visit to Norway.

On 8 January 2022, it was reported police had arrested a wanted woman who worked as a cleaning assistant at the private residence of Andersson. The arrest happened on 21 December. The woman is said to be from Nicaragua and it is alleged that she had not left the country when her residence permit had expired. Several opposition politicians expressed concern over the lack of security surrounding the prime minister. Following a party leader debate on 12 January, Andersson tested positive for COVID-19. According to her press secretary, she began remote working after having been tested.

On 2 June, the Sweden Democrats (SD) put forward a confidence vote against Minister for Justice Morgan Johansson, alleging that he did not properly tackle gang violence and the ongoing recruitment of people into them. Andersson stated that if the motion against Johansson passed, she and the entire government would resign, saying: "In Sweden, we have collective decision-making in the government. If you dismiss a minister because of political decisions, then you dismiss the entire government. It goes without saying." In August, a month before the 2022 Swedish general election, Andersson confirmed that she had confronted Christian Democrats (KD) leader Ebba Busch at Expressen about a supposed theft of campaign posters outside the prime minister's residence. Busch herself denied the allegations, while Andersson claimed that she had evidence of the theft.

Heading into the general election on 11 September 2022, Andersson's leadership moved the Social Democrats to the left after the publication of a May 2021 party report, "Distributional Policies for Equality and Fairness", which criticised the rising inequalities that emerged from political decisions by previous left and right governments. The Social Democrats remained the largest party in the Riksdag and made gains but the left's bloc, which also included the liberal Centre Party after breaking off with the centre-right Alliance in 2018, was narrowly defeated by the right's bloc, led by the Moderate Party (M), KD, and the Liberals (L), which included the far-right SD. Andersson conceded defeat on 14 September and subsequently announced her resignation while remaining the head of a caretaker government. Andersson said the results were not a loss for social democracy. At the same time, she said the right bloc government looked unstable and she would be ready to return as prime minister in the future. She called upon M, KD, and L to reject SD, and said she was open to a government with M that would exclude SD.

=== Foreign policy ===
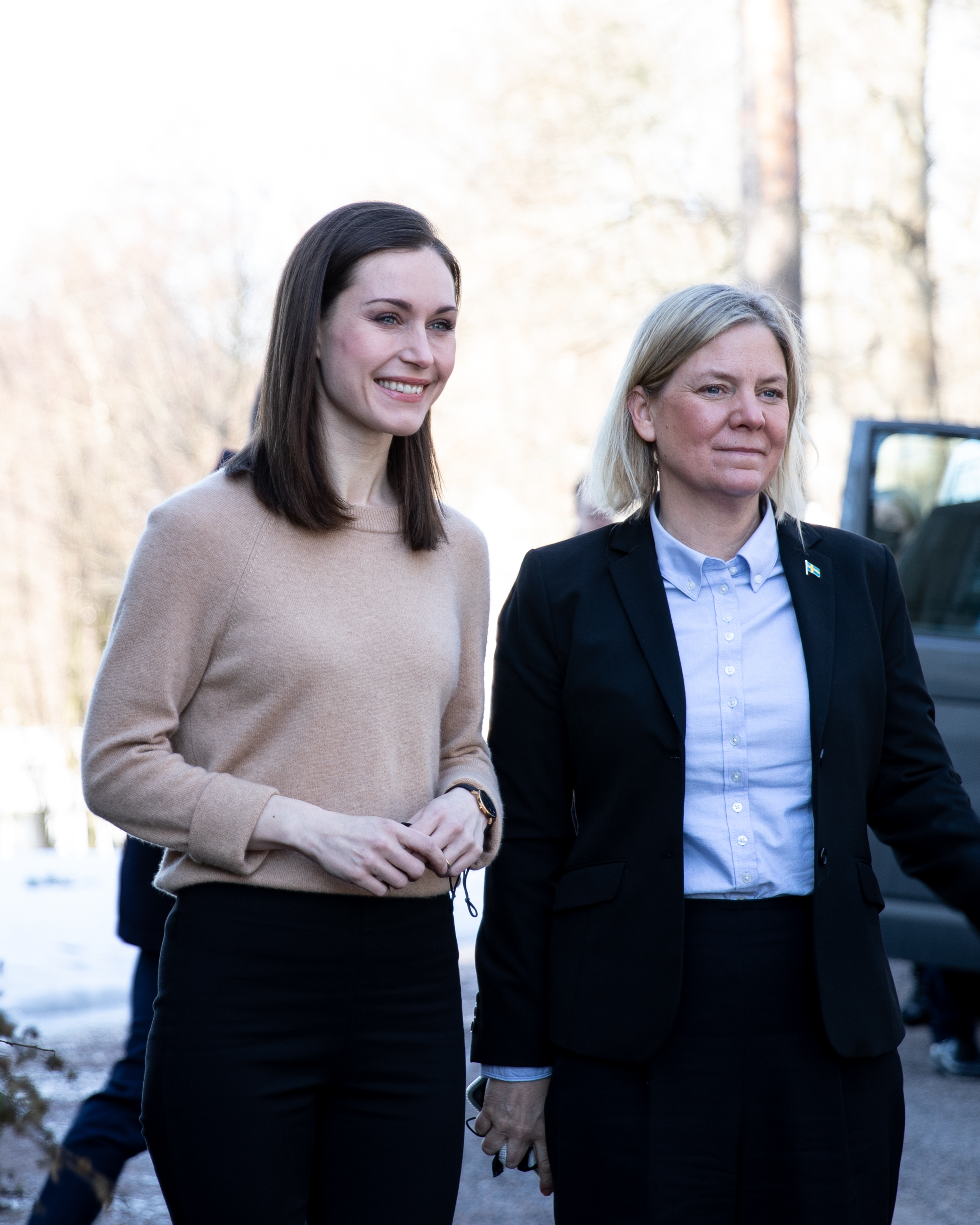
Andersson met with the Prime minister of Finland Sanna Marin in Helsinki on 5 March 2022.

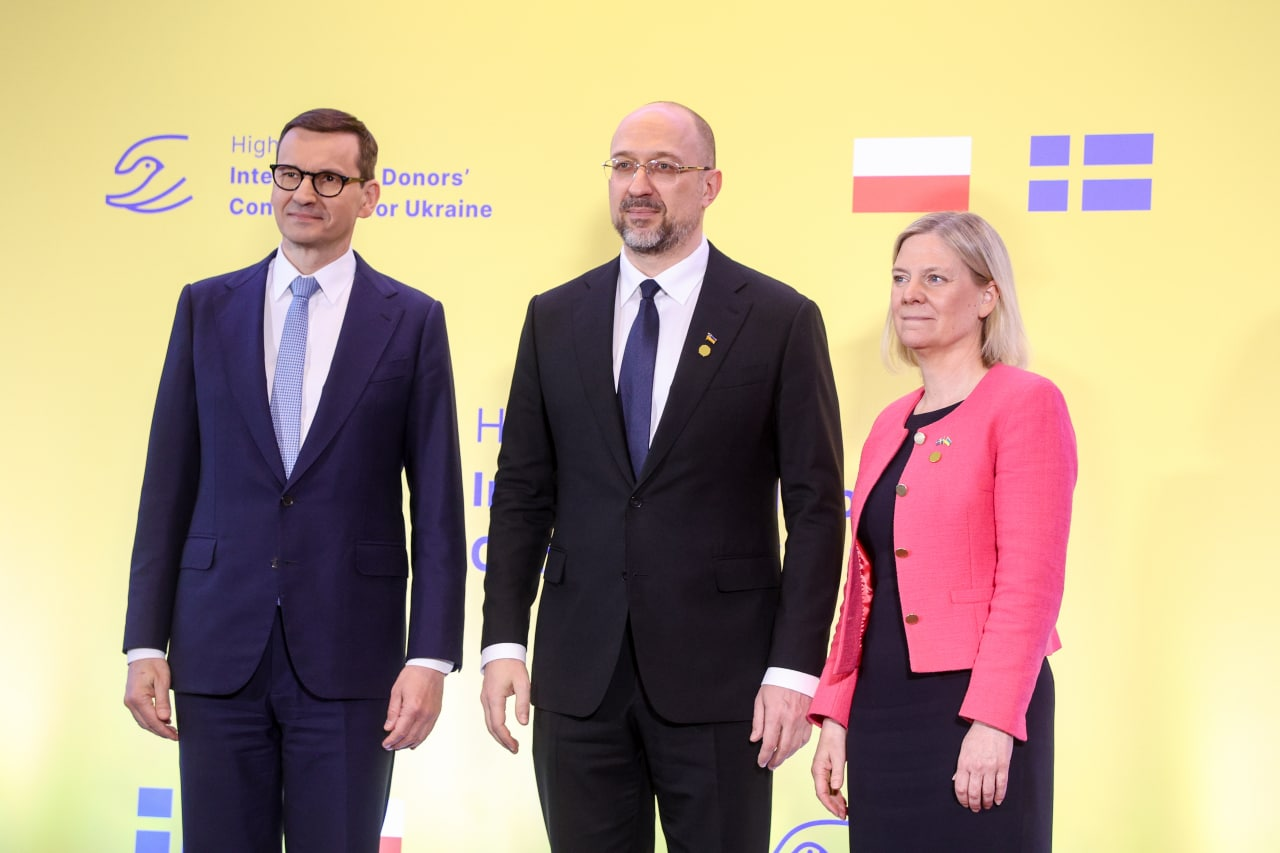
Andersson met with the Prime Minister of Poland Mateusz Morawiecki and Prime Minister of Ukraine Denys Shmyhal in Warsaw on 5 May 2022.

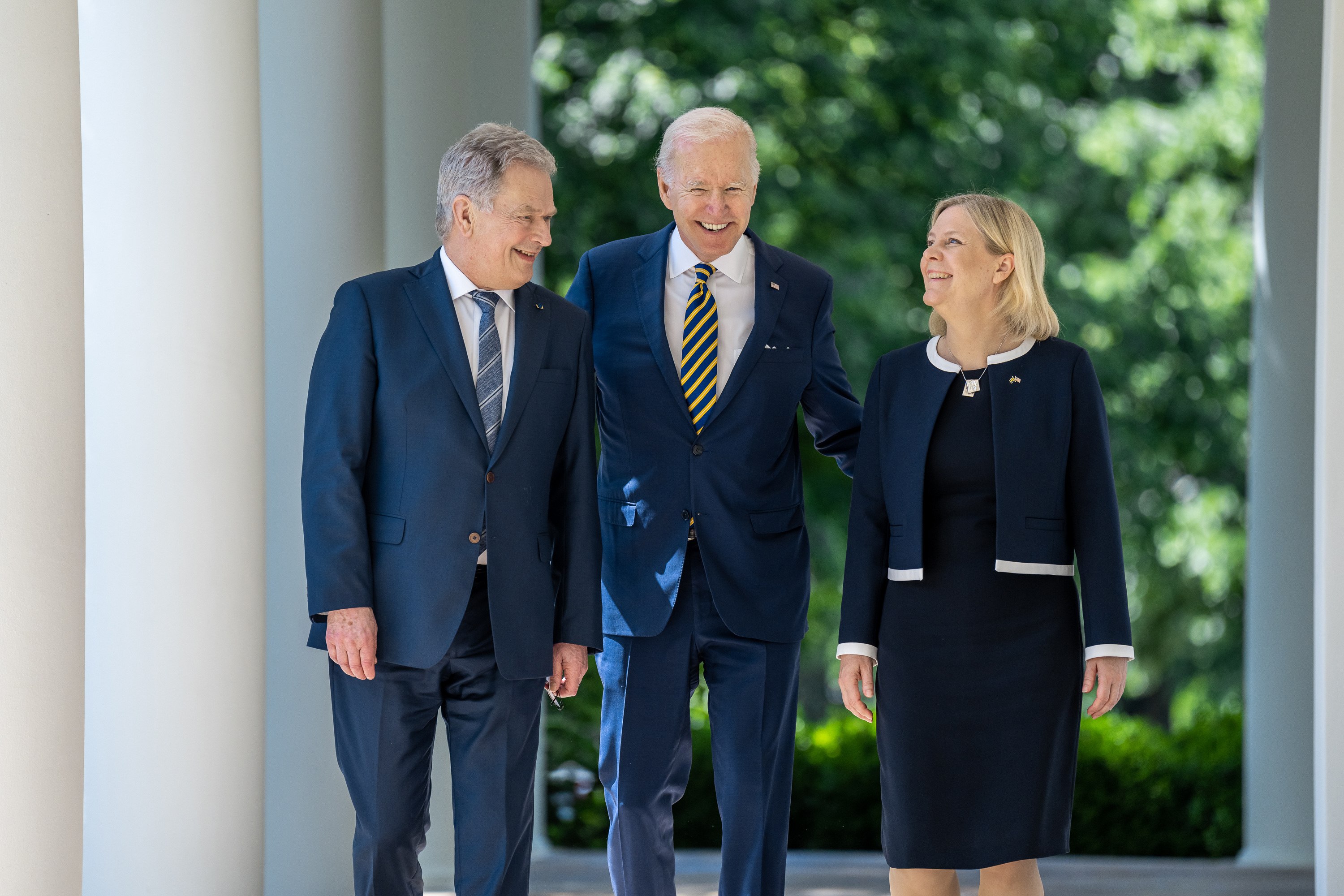
Andersson with US President Joe Biden and Finnish President Sauli Niinistö in the White House in May 2022

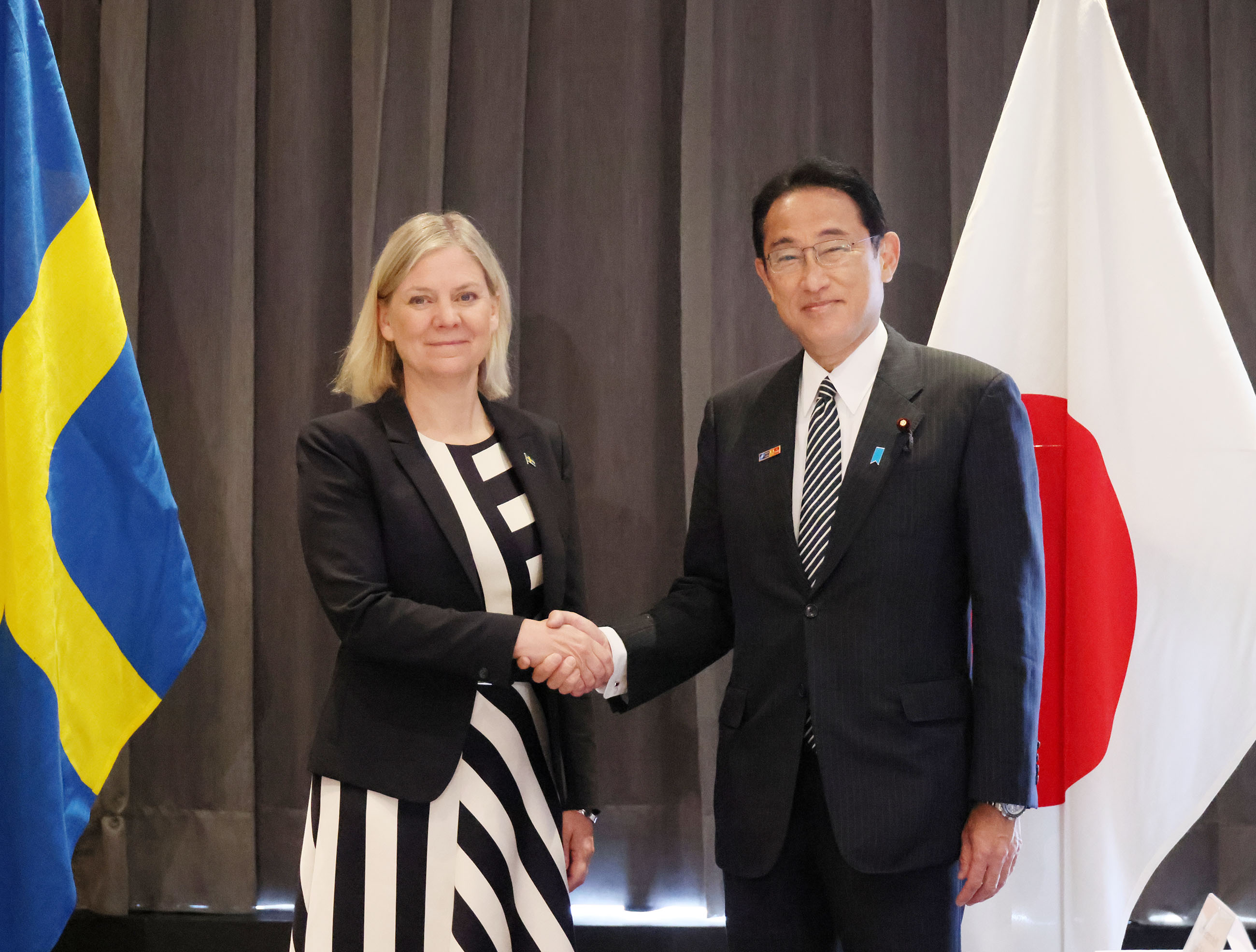
Andersson met with the Prime minister of Japan Fumio Kishida in Madrid on 29 June 2022.

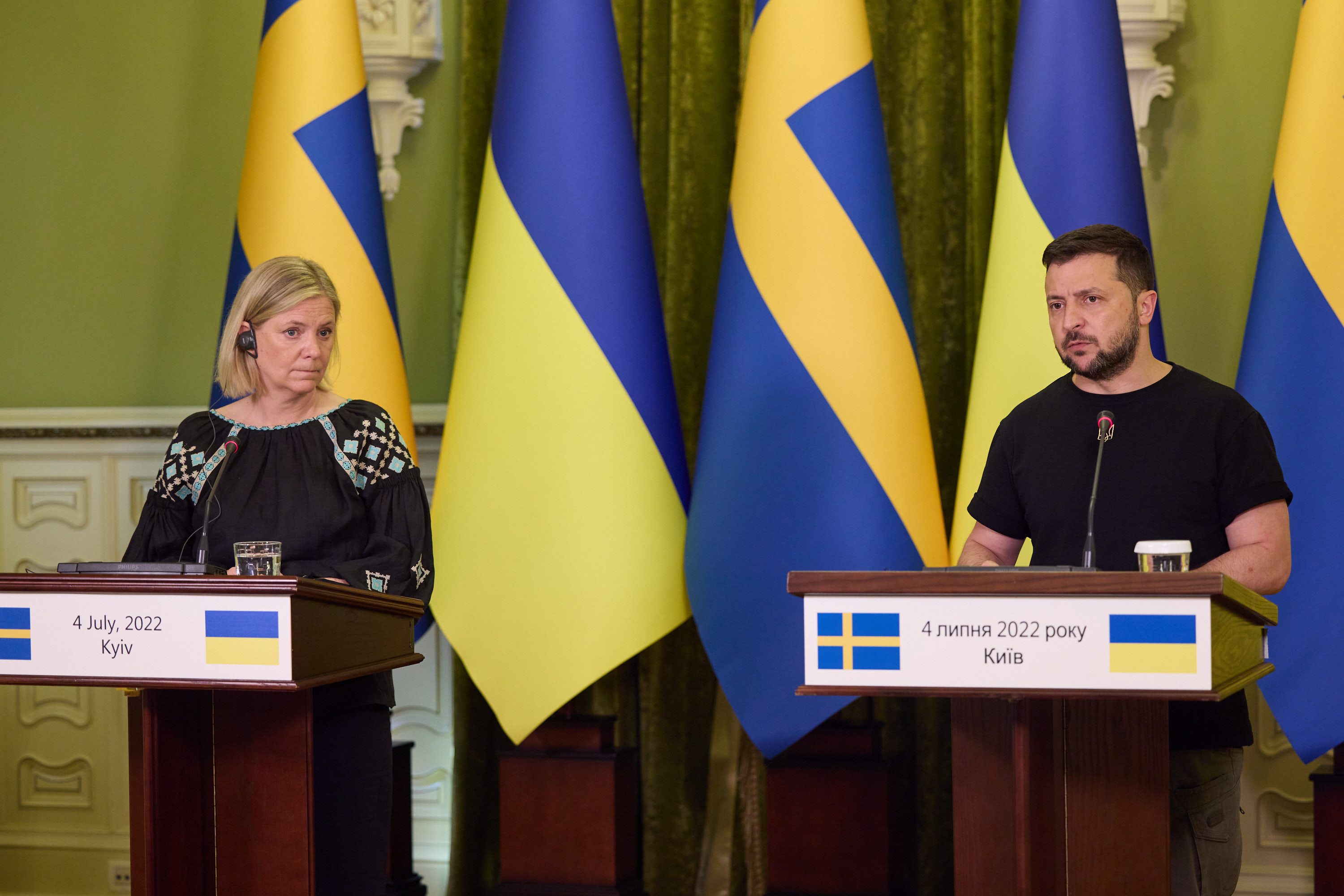
Andersson met with the President of Ukraine Volodymyr Zelenskyy in Kyiv on 4 July 2022.

Following the 2022 Russian invasion of Ukraine in February, Sweden and the Social Democrats began to reevaluate their traditional position of neutrality. The Social Democrats began a review of their policy which they intended to finish before summer of 2022. On 15 May, the party announced that it backed the accession of Sweden into NATO, reversing its previous policy. Andersson said Sweden did not want permanent NATO bases or nuclear weapons on its territory. She welcomed the deal agreed by European Union leaders to ban more than 90 percent of Russian oil imports by the end of the year.

=== Accession of Sweden to NATO ===
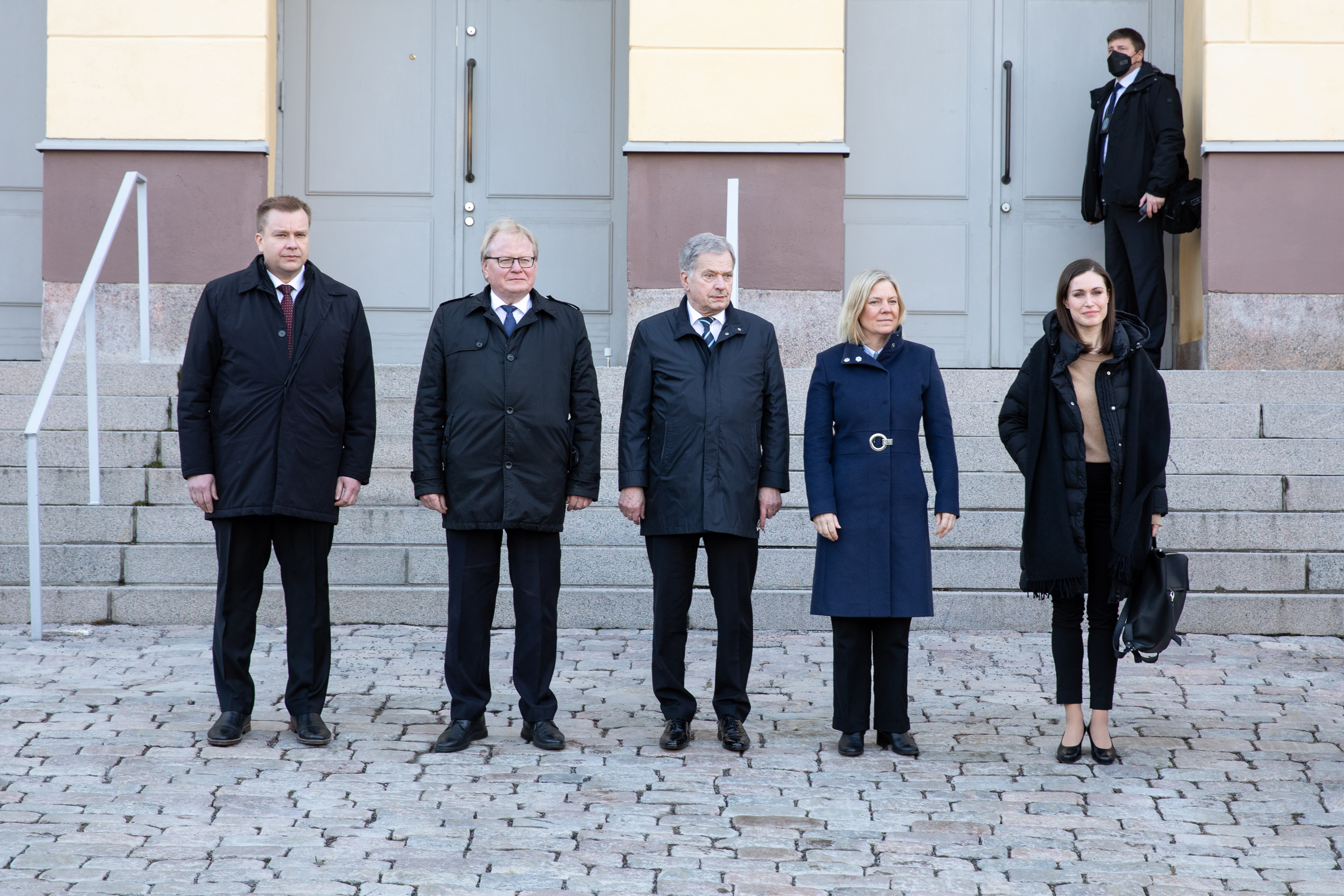
Andersson with Finnish Prime Minister Sanna Marin, Finnish President Sauli Niinistö, Finnish Defence Minister Antti Kaikkonen and Swedish Defence Minister Peter Hultqvist in Helsinki on 5 March 2022

Turkey opposed Sweden joining NATO because according to Turkey it "hosts terrorist organisations which act against Turkey", including the PKK, YPG, and Gülen movement. On 21 May 2022, Andersson, after a telephone conversation with Turkish president Erdoğan, announced in an interview with Sweden's state television SVT that they are always ready for dialogue with Turkey regarding Sweden's NATO membership and that they always condemn terrorism. On 28 June 2022, the first day of the 2022 NATO summit in Madrid, the Turkish delegation dropped their opposition to Finland and Sweden's NATO membership applications and signed a tripartite memorandum addressing Turkey's concerns regarding arms exports and the Kurdish–Turkish conflict. On 30 June, Turkish president Recep Tayyip Erdoğan said that Sweden had made a promise to extradite to Turkey what he characterised as "73 terrorists". Andersson refused to deny Turkey's claim that Sweden had promised to deport Turkish political refugees and opponents wanted by Erdoğan's government.

== Political positions ==
=== Migration ===
Ahead of the 2022 Swedish general election, then Minister for Integration Anders Ygeman presented new efforts to combat segregation, saying that he wants to introduce a 50 percent-maximum cap of how many people with non-Nordic ethnic background can live in a certain area. This led to criticism from Centre Party leader Annie Lööf, who said that she would work against this policy of "ethnic quotas" in any government led by the Social Democrats. When asked a week later Andersson said that she stands by and supports Ygeman's proposal. Just a few weeks later in an interview with Dagens Nyheter, she spoke about segregation in Sweden and said that "we do not wish to see Chinatown, Somalitown or Little Italy in Sweden, we should be able to live mixed with the experiences we have".

When interviewed by the newspaper Expressen after the election, and the Kristersson Cabinet had been formed, Andersson said she was happy with the new government's harsh policies on migration and asylum and reiterated that it was her predecessor, former prime minister Stefan Löfven, who was responsible for the real paradigm shift regarding migration after the 2015 refugee crisis. For this shift in her stance on migration she was criticised by editors in left-leaning newspapers.

=== Legal and criminal policy ===
Shortly after she took office in 2021, Andersson said in an interview with Dagens Nyheter that she believes more criminals who lack Swedish citizenship should be deported.

In 2022, after an ostensible plan to burn a Quran triggered riots in Sweden, Andersson held a press conference with then Minister for Justice Morgan Johansson where she claimed that this had happened because "segregation has been allowed to go so far that we have parallel societies [in Sweden]" and linked these riots to Sweden's large immigration.

While at Järvaveckan in the summer of 2022 Andersson gave a speech about the rise of crime in Sweden where she said segregation is the cause of the high crime levels. She also stated that her government had toughened over seventy penalties and criminalised more than 30 acts.

== Other roles ==
- Asian Infrastructure Investment Bank (AIIB), ex-officio member of the board of governors
- European Bank for Reconstruction and Development (EBRD), ex-officio member of the board of governors
- European Investment Bank (EIB), ex-officio member of the board of governors (since 2014)
- Multilateral Investment Guarantee Agency (MIGA), World Bank Group, ex-officio member of the board of governors
- Nordic Investment Bank (NIB), ex-officio Chairwoman of the board of governors
- World Bank, ex-officio Member of the board of governors
- Policy Network, member of the board (2005–2009)

== Personal life ==
Since 1997, Andersson has been married to Richard Friberg, a professor in economics at the Stockholm School of Economics; the couple have two children. They are avid outdoors people; they often go hiking, kayaking and mountaineering. Andersson is an atheist but still feels churches are necessary as a counterforce against segregation and gang crime.

Political offices
Preceded by Anders Borg	Minister for Finance; 2014–2021	Succeeded by Mikael Damberg
Preceded by Stefan Löfven	Prime Minister of Sweden; 2021–2022	Succeeded by Ulf Kristersson
Preceded by Ulf Kristersson	Leader of the Opposition; 2022–present	Incumbent
Party political offices
Preceded by Stefan Löfven	Leader of the Social Democratic Party; 2021–present	Incumbent
