= Minister for Public Health (Sweden) =

- Folkhälsominister
- Lesser coat of arms of Sweden

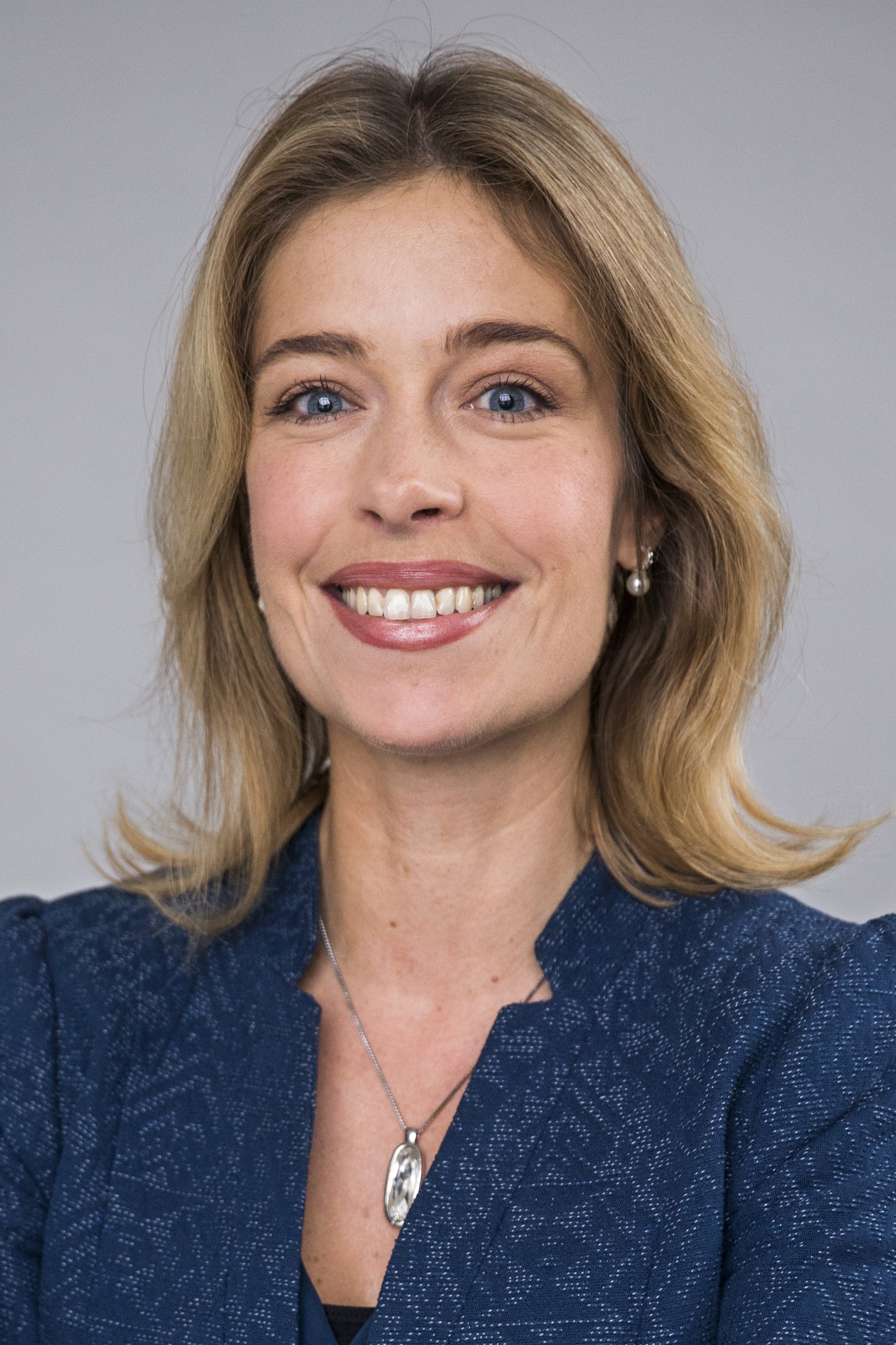
- Incumbent; Annika Strandhäll since 27 July 2017
- Ministry of Health and Social Affairs
- Member of: The Government
- Seat: Stockholm, Sweden
- Appointer: The Prime Minister
- Term length: No fixed term serves at the pleasure of the Prime Minister
- Formation: 21 October 2002
- First holder: Morgan Johansson

The Minister for Public Health (Swedish: Folkhälsominister) is a cabinet minister within the Swedish Government. The cabinet minister is appointed by the Prime Minister of Sweden.

== List of officeholders ==
No.	Portrait	Minister (Born–Died)	Other portfolios	Tenure			Political party	Cabinet
No.	Portrait	Minister (Born–Died)	Other portfolios	Took office	Left office	Duration	Political party	Cabinet
1		Morgan Johansson (born 1970)	–	21 October 2002	6 October 2006	3 years, 350 days	Social Democrats	Persson
2		Maria Larsson (born 1956)	Minister for the Elderly	6 October 2006	5 October 2010	3 years, 364 days	Christian Democrats	Reinfeldt
3		Göran Hägglund (born 1959)	Minister for Social Affairs	6 October 2010	3 October 2014	3 years, 362 days	Christian Democrats	Reinfeldt
4		Gabriel Wikström (born 1985)	Minister for Healthcare; Minister for Sports	3 October 2014	27 July 2017	2 years, 297 days	Social Democrats	Löfven I
–		Annika Strandhäll (acting)	Minister for Social Security	5 May 2017	27 July 2017	83 days	Social Democrats	Löfven I
5		Annika Strandhäll (born 1975)	Minister for Social Affairs	27 July 2017	21 January 2019	1 year, 178 days	Social Democrats	Löfven I
6		Lena Hallengren (born 1973)	Minister for Health and Social Affairs	21 January 2019	Incumbent	7 years, 229 days	Social Democrats	Löfven II
