= Maj-Inger Klingvall =

Swedish politician (born 1946)

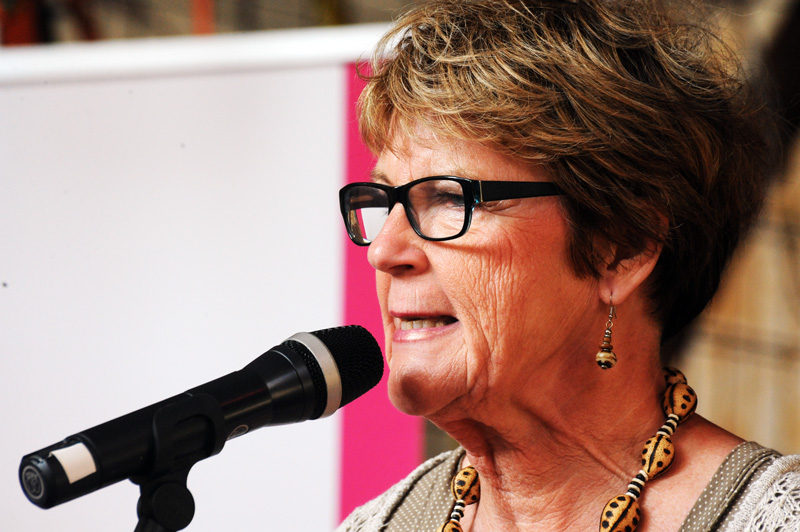
- Klingvall at Nordic Forum in Malmö, Sweden in June 2014

Minister for Social Security
- In office 22 March 1996 – 14 September 1999
- Prime Minister: Göran Persson
- Preceded by: Anna Hedborg
- Succeeded by: Ingela Thalén

Acting Minister of Health and Social Affairs
- In office 29 October 1998 – 16 November 1998
- Prime Minister: Göran Persson
- Preceded by: Anders Sundström
- Succeeded by: Lars Engqvist

Minister for International Development Co-operation
- In office 14 September 1999 – 16 November 2001
- Prime Minister: Göran Persson
- Preceded by: Pierre Schori
- Succeeded by: Jan O. Karlsson

Minister for Migration
- In office 14 September 1999 – 16 November 2001
- Prime Minister: Göran Persson
- Preceded by: Pierre Schori
- Succeeded by: Jan O. Karlsson

Personal details
- Born: Elsa Maj-Inger Ohlsson; 15 May 1946 (age 80) Nyköping, Sweden
- Party: Social Democratic Party
- Spouse: Rolf Klingvall (m. 1967, divorced)
- Children: 4
- Education: Stockholm University; Linköping University

Elsa Maj-Inger Klingvall, née Ohlsson (born 15 May 1946) is a Swedish Social Democratic politician and diplomat. She served as a member of the Riksdag for Östergötland County from 1988 to 2002 and was a cabinet minister in the government of Göran Persson, first as minister for social security (1996–1999) and later as minister for international development co-operation and minister for migration (1999–2001). After leaving government, she was Sweden’s ambassador to Mozambique, with accreditation to Swaziland, from 2003 to 2007, and later worked at the Ministry for Foreign Affairs with responsibility for West Africa until her retirement in 2011. She has also been active in the Social Democratic Women in Sweden and served as chair of UNICEF Sweden from 2017.

== Early life ==
Klingvall was born Elsa Maj-Inger Ohlsson on 15 May 1946 in Nyköping, Sweden, the daughter of Sven Ohlsson and his wife Elsa (née Karlsson). Klingvall received Bachelor of Arts degree from Stockholm University in 1970 and a Master of Social Science degree from Linköping University in 1972.

== Career ==
Klingvall served as secretary of the Östergötland County Council from 1973 to 1975, secretary of Norrköping Municipality from 1975 to 1976, and political secretary there from 1977 to 1985. From 1986 she was first deputy chair of the Norrköping Social Welfare Board, with special responsibility for child, individual, and family services. Between 1986 and 1988 she worked as a full-time municipal politician, before being elected to the Riksdag as a Social Democratic MP for the Östergötland County constituency, a position she held from 1988 until 2002.

In the government of Prime Minister Göran Persson, Klingvall was a cabinet minister from 1996 to 2001. She first served as minister for social security at the Ministry of Health and Social Affairs (1996–1999), and later as minister for international development co-operation and minister for migration at the Ministry for Foreign Affairs (1999–2001). For a brief period in 1998, following Margot Wallström's resignation, she also served as acting minister for health and social affairs.

In the Riksdag, she was deputy member of the Committee on Health and Welfare (1988–1991), later a full member of the same committee (1991–1994), member and chair of the Committee on Social Insurance (1994–1996), deputy member of the Committee on Civil-Law Legislation (1988–1994), and member of the War Delegation (1994–1998).

Locally, Klingvall was a member of Norrköping's municipal council from 1977 to 1996 and chair of the social district committee from 1980 to 1985. She also served in a number of national committees and boards, including: the program board for preschool teacher and recreation education at Linköping University (from 1977), the Atomic Legislation Committee (1979–1983), the municipal executive board in Norrköping (1986–1991), the education and research board for teacher training at Linköping University (1987–1991), the Rental Law Committee (1989–1992), the Swedish Atomic Energy Board (Statens kärnkraftinspektion) (1989–1995), the theme council at Linköping University (1990–1993), the Social Democratic Party’s executive board (from 1990) and its executive committee (from 1996), the Children’s Environment Council (Barnmiljörådet) (chair, 1991–1993), and the Swedish Committee for International Adoptions (Statens nämnd för internationella adoptionsfrågor) (member from 1992, chair 1995–1996). She was also a board member of the National Swedish Social Insurance Board from 1995 to 1996.

Within the Social Democratic Women in Sweden, she held leadership roles both locally and nationally: she was a board member in Östergötland from 1974 and its chair from 1982, and she also served on the national board from 1975 and on its executive committee from 1984 to 1995.

Klingvall left the government in November 2001 after the Social Democratic Party congress declined to re-elect her to the party’s executive committee. After a short return to parliament as a deputy member of the Committee on Cultural Affairs (2002), she was appointed ambassador to Mozambique in 2003, with dual accreditation to Swaziland (now Eswatini). Her posting ended in July 2007, after which she continued at the Ministry for Foreign Affairs as ambassador with responsibility for West Africa until her retirement on 1 May 2011.

In 2010, together with Gabriele Winai Ström, she published Från Myrdal till Lindh: svenska diplomatprofiler (From Myrdal to Lindh: Swedish Diplomatic Profiles).

Klingvall became vice chair of UNICEF Sweden in 2011 and was elected chair in 2017.

== Personal life ==
In 1967, she married Rolf Klingvall (born 1944), the son of Oskar Klingvall and Ingrid (née Karlsson). They later divorced. She has four children.

Political offices
Preceded by Anna Hedborg	Minister for Social Security; 1996–1999	Succeeded by Ingela Thalén
Preceded by Anders Sundström	Acting Minister for Health and Social Affairs; 1998–1998	Succeeded by Lars Engqvist
Preceded by Pierre Schori	Minister for International Development Co-operation; 1999–2001	Succeeded by Jan O. Karlsson
Preceded by Pierre Schori	Minister for Migration; 1999–2001	Succeeded by Jan O. Karlsson
Diplomatic posts
Preceded by Erik Åberg	Amabssador of Sweden to Mozambique; 2003–2007	Succeeded by Torvald Åkesson
Preceded by Erik Åberg	Amabssador of Sweden to Swaziland; 2003–2007	Succeeded by Torvald Åkesson
