= Agneta Karlsson =

Swedish politician (born 1962)

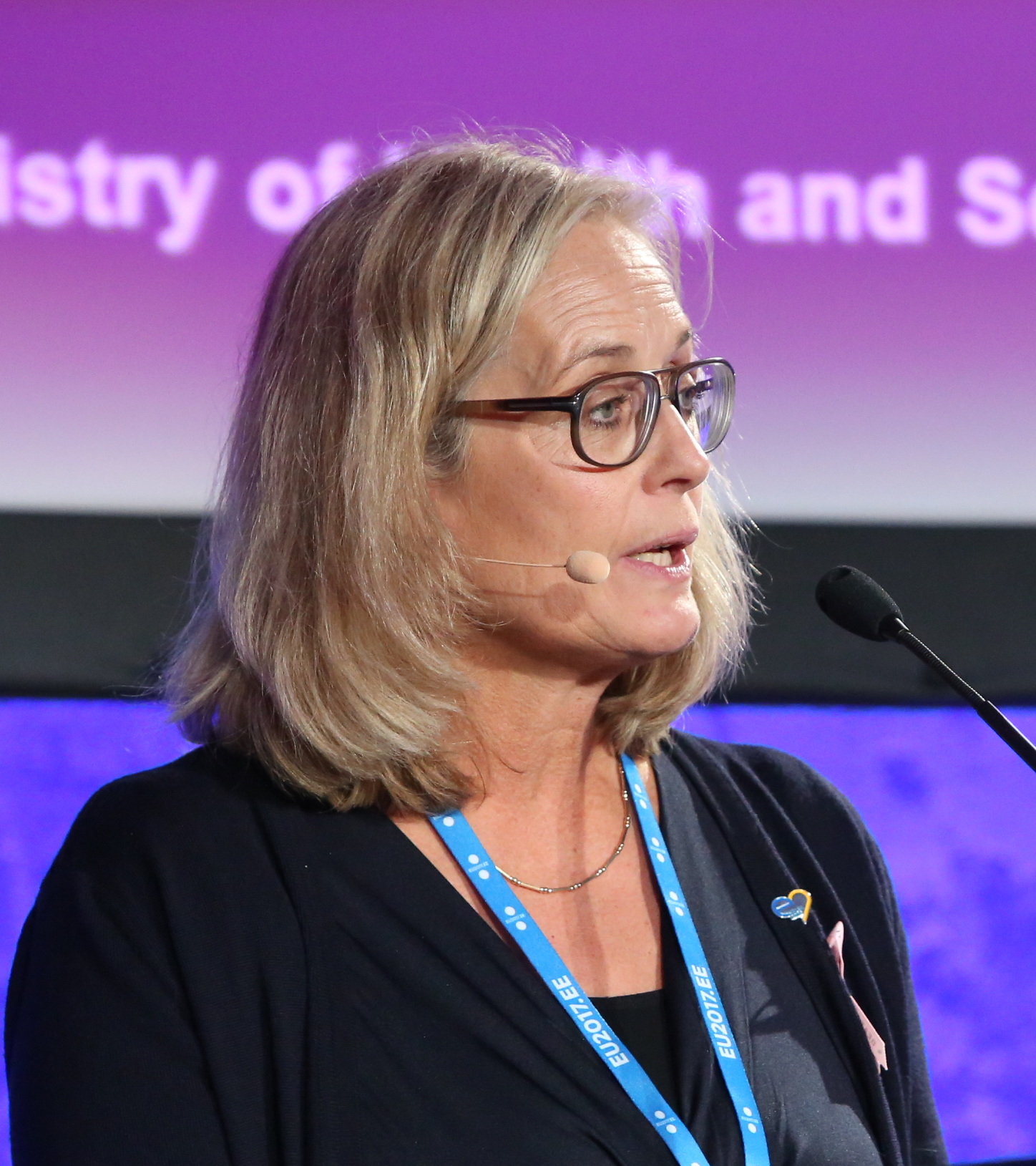
- Born: 1962 (age 63–64); Sweden
- Occupation: Politician
- Known for: Member of the Riksdag
- Political party: Social Democratic Party

Agneta Karlsson (born 1962) is a Swedish Social Democratic Party politician.

She was elected deputy member of the Riksdag for the period 2014–2018 from the Stockholm County constituency. She has also served as State Secretary, including for Ingela Thalén and for Gabriel Wikström.
