= Minister for Health and Social Affairs (Sweden) =

Swedish cabinet minister

Councilor of State and Head of the Ministry of Health and Social Affairs
- Statsråd och chef för Socialdepartmentet
- Incumbent; Jakob Forssmed since 18 October 2022
- Ministry of Health and Social Affairs
- Appointer: The Prime Minister
- Inaugural holder: Bernhard Eriksson
- Formation: 1 July 1920
- Website: www.government.se

The Councilor of State and Head of the Ministry of Health and Social Affairs Swedish: Statsråd och chef för Socialdepartementet), commonly known as the Minister for Public Health and Social Security is the head of the Ministry of Health and Social Affairs in the Government of Sweden.

All heads of the ministry have been Ministers for Health and Social Affairs, except the years 2014–2017 when the Minister for Social Security, Annika Strandhäll, was head of the ministry.

== List of Head of the Ministry of Health and Social Affairs ==
Denotes acting Minister for Health and Social Affairs

No.	Portrait	Name	Title	Took office	Left office	Time in office	Party	Prime Minister
1	Bernhard Eriksson	Bernhard Eriksson (1878–1952)	Minister for Health and Social Affairs	1 July 1920	27 October 1920	118 days	Social Democrats	Hjalmar Branting (S)
2	Henning Elmquist	Henning Elmquist (1871–1933)	Minister for Health and Social Affairs	27 October 1920	13 October 1921	351 days	Independent	Gerhard Louis De Geer (27 October 1920 – 23 February 1921); Oscar von Sydow (23 February 1921 – 13 October 1921)
3	Herman Lindqvist	Herman Lindqvist (1863–1932)	Minister for Health and Social Affairs	13 October 1921	19 April 1923	1 year, 188 days	Social Democrats	Hjalmar Branting (S)
4	Gösta Malm	Gösta Malm (1873–1965)	Minister for Health and Social Affairs	19 April 1923	18 October 1924	1 year, 188 days	Independent	Ernst Trygger (National Party)
5	Gustav Möller	Gustav Möller (1884–1970)	Minister for Health and Social Affairs	18 October 1924	7 June 1926	1 year, 232 days	Social Democrats	Hjalmar Branting (S) (18 October 1924 – 24 January 1925); Rickard Sandler (S) (24 January 1925 – 7 June 1926)
6	Jakob Pettersson	Jakob Pettersson (1866–1957)	Minister for Health and Social Affairs	7 June 1926	2 October 1928	2 years, 117 days	Liberals	Carl Gustaf Ekman (L)
7	Sven Lübeck	Sven Lübeck (1877–1941)	Minister for Health and Social Affairs	2 October 1928	7 June 1930	1 year, 248 days	Electoral League	Arvid Lindman (Electoral League)
8	Sam Larsson	Sam Larsson (1883–1945)	Minister for Health and Social Affairs	7 June 1930	24 September 1932	2 years, 109 days	Liberals	Carl Gustaf Ekman (L) (7 June 1930 – 6 August 1932); Felix Hamrin (L) (6 August 1932 – 24 September 1932)
(5)	Gustav Möller	Gustav Möller (1884–1970)	Minister for Health and Social Affairs	24 September 1932	19 June 1936	3 years, 269 days	Social Democrats	Per Albin Hansson (S)
9	Gerhard Strindlund	Gerhard Strindlund (1890–1957)	Minister for Health and Social Affairs	19 June 1936	28 September 1936	101 days	Centre	Axel Pehrsson-Bramstorp (C)
(5)	Gustav Möller	Gustav Möller (1884–1970)	Minister for Health and Social Affairs	28 September 1936	16 December 1938	2 years, 79 days	Social Democrats	Per Albin Hansson (S)
10	Albert Forslund	Albert Forslund (1881–1957)	Minister for Health and Social Affairs	16 December 1938	13 December 1939	362 days	Social Democrats	Per Albin Hansson (S)
(5)	Gustav Möller	Gustav Möller (1884–1970)	Minister for Health and Social Affairs	13 December 1939	1 October 1951	11 years, 292 days	Social Democrats	Per Albin Hansson (S) (13 December 1939 – 6 October 1946); Tage Erlander (S) (11 October 1946 – 1 October 1951)
11	Gunnar Sträng	Gunnar Sträng (1906–1992)	Minister for Health and Social Affairs	1 October 1951	12 September 1955	3 years, 346 days	Social Democrats	Tage Erlander (S)
12	John Ericsson	John Ericsson (1907–1977)	Minister for Health and Social Affairs	12 September 1955	22 March 1957	1 year, 191 days	Social Democrats	Tage Erlander (S)
13	Torsten Nilsson	Torsten Nilsson (1905–1997)	Minister for Health and Social Affairs	22 March 1955	19 September 1962	7 years, 181 days	Social Democrats	Tage Erlander (S)
14	Sven Aspling	Sven Aspling (1912–2000)	Minister for Health and Social Affairs	19 September 1962	8 October 1976	14 years, 19 days	Social Democrats	Tage Erlander (S) (19 September 1962 – 14 October 1969); Olof Palme (S) (14 October 1969 – 8 October 1976)
15	Rune Gustavsson	Rune Gustavsson (1920–2002)	Minister for Health and Social Affairs	8 October 1976	18 October 1978	2 years, 10 days	Centre	Thorbjörn Fälldin (C)
16	Gabriel Romanus	Gabriel Romanus (born 1939)	Minister for Health and Social Affairs	18 October 1978	12 October 1979	359 days	Liberals	Ola Ullsten (L)
17	Karin Söder	Karin Söder (1928–2015)	Minister for Health and Social Affairs	12 October 1979	8 October 1982	2 years, 361 days	Centre	Thorbjörn Fälldin (C)
18	Sten Andersson	Sten Andersson (1923–2006)	Minister for Health and Social Affairs	8 October 1982	16 October 1985	3 years, 8 days	Social Democrats	Olof Palme (S)
19	Gertrud Sigurdsen	Gertrud Sigurdsen (1923–2015)	Minister for Health and Social Affairs	16 October 1985	29 January 1989	3 years, 105 days	Social Democrats	Olof Palme (S) (16 October 1985 – 28 February 1986); Ingvar Carlsson (S) (13 March 1986 – 29 January 1989)
20	Sven Hulterström	Sven Hulterström (born 1938)	Minister for Health and Social Affairs	29 January 1989	11 January 1990	347 days	Social Democrats	Ingvar Carlsson (S)
21	Ingela Thalén	Ingela Thalén (born 1943)	Minister for Health and Social Affairs	11 January 1990	4 October 1991	1 year, 266 days	Social Democrats	Ingvar Carlsson (S)
22	Bengt Westerberg	Bengt Westerberg (born 1943)	Minister for Health and Social Affairs	4 October 1991	7 October 1994	3 years, 3 days	Liberals	Carl Bildt (M)
(21)	Ingela Thalén	Ingela Thalén (born 1943)	Minister for Health and Social Affairs	7 October 1994	22 March 1996	1 year, 167 days	Social Democrats	Ingvar Carlsson (S)
23	Margot Wallström	Margot Wallström (born 1954)	Minister for Health and Social Affairs	22 March 1996	7 October 1998	2 years, 199 days	Social Democrats	Göran Persson (S)
24	Anders Sundström	Anders Sundström (born 1952)	Minister for Health and Social Affairs	7 October 1998	26 October 1998	19 days	Social Democrats	Göran Persson (S)
–	Maj-Inger Klingvall	Maj-Inger Klingvall (born 1946); Acting	Minister for Health and Social Affairs	26 October 1998	16 November 1998	21 days	Social Democrats	Göran Persson (S)
25	Lars Engqvist	Lars Engqvist (born 1945)	Minister for Health and Social Affairs	16 November 1998	1 October 2004	5 years, 320 days	Social Democrats	Göran Persson (S)
26	Berit Andnor	Berit Andnor (born 1954)	Minister for Health and Social Affairs	1 October 2004	6 October 2006	2 years, 5 days	Social Democrats	Göran Persson (S)
27	Göran Hägglund	Göran Hägglund (born 1959)	Minister for Health and Social Affairs	6 October 2006	3 October 2014	7 years, 362 days	Christian Democrats	Fredrik Reinfeldt (M)
28	Annika Strandhäll	Annika Strandhäll (born 1975)	Minister for Social Security (2014–2017); Minister for Health and Social Affairs (2017–2019)	3 October 2014	21 January 2019	4 years, 110 days	Social Democrats	Stefan Löfven (S)
29	Lena Hallengren	Lena Hallengren (born 1973)	Minister for Health and Social Affairs	21 January 2019	6 October 2022	3 years, 258 days	Social Democrats	Stefan Löfven (S) (21 January 2019 – 30 November 2021); Magdalena Andersson (S) (30 November 2021 – 6 October 2022)
–	Ardalan Shekarabi	Ardalan Shekarabi (born 1978); Acting	Minister for Health and Social Affairs	6 October 2022	18 October 2022	12 days	Social Democrats	Magdalena Andersson (S)
30	Jakob Forssmed	Jakob Forssmed (born 1974)	Minister for Health and Social Affairs	18 October 2022		3 years, 324 days	Christian Democrats	Ulf Kristersson (M)
