= Göran Hägglund =

Swedish politician (born 1959)

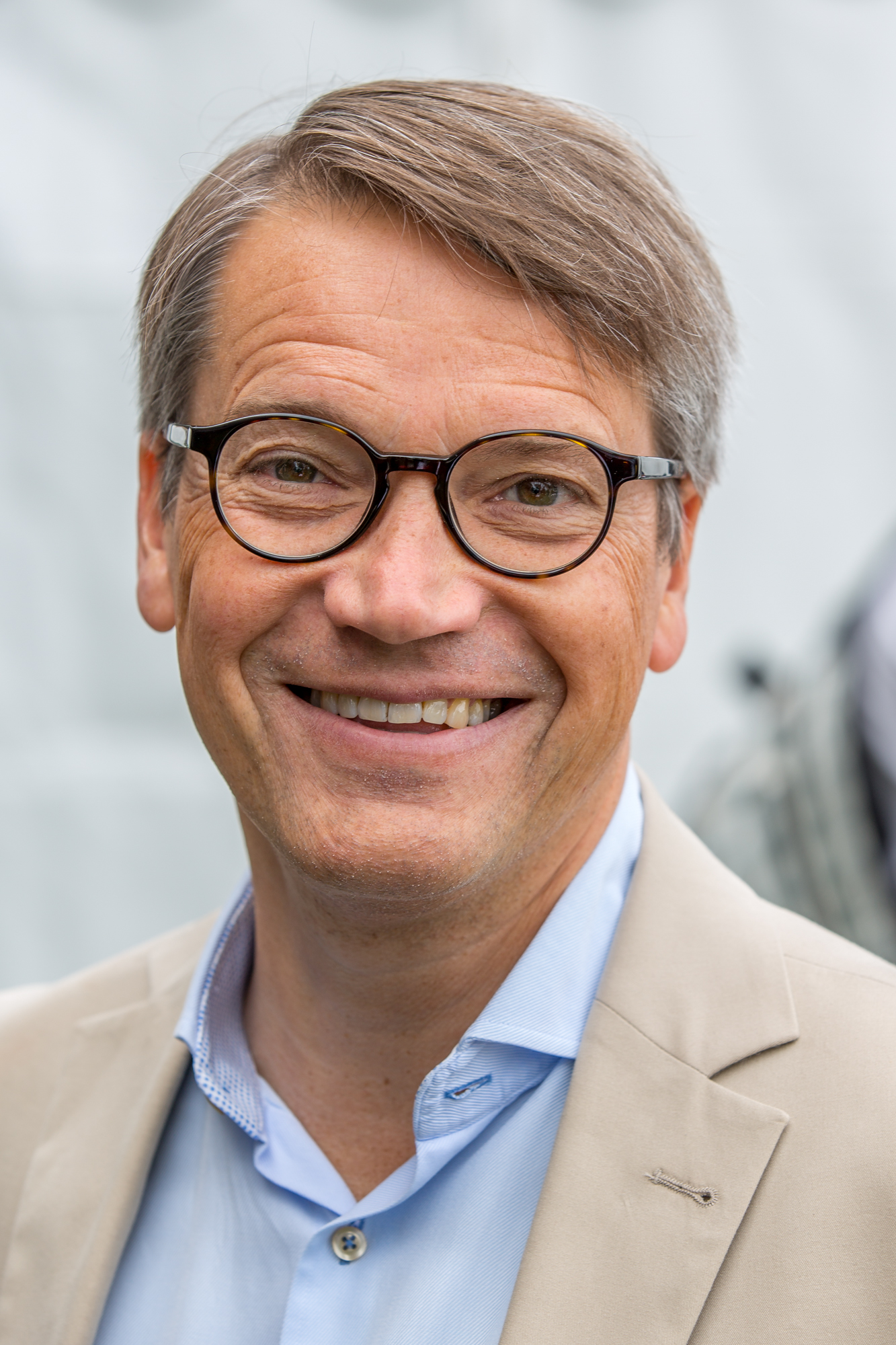
- Hägglund in 2014

Leader of the Christian Democrats
- In office 3 April 2004 – 25 April 2015
- Deputy: Maria Larsson
- Preceded by: Alf Svensson
- Succeeded by: Ebba Busch

Minister for Social Affairs
- In office 6 October 2006 – 3 October 2014
- Prime Minister: Fredrik Reinfeldt
- Preceded by: Berit Andnor
- Succeeded by: Gabriel Wikström

Member of the Riksdag
- In office 30 September 1991 – 25 April 2015
- Constituency: Halland County

Father of the House
- In office 1 January 2015 – 25 April 2015
- Preceded by: Per Westerberg
- Succeeded by: Krister Örnfjäder

Personal details
- Born: 27 January 1959 (age 67) Degerfors, Sweden
- Party: Christian Democrats
- Spouse: Married
- Children: 2
- Occupation: Politician

Bo Göran Hägglund (born 27 January 1959) is a Swedish politician of the Christian Democrats. He was the leader of the Christian Democrats from 2004 to 2015, Member of the Riksdag from 1991 to 2015, and served as Minister for Social Affairs from 2006 to 2014.

== Early life and political career ==
Hägglund's parents are originally from Finland: they moved to Sweden in the 1950s. He was born in Degerfors in central Sweden, but moved to Jönköping, a Christian Democratic stronghold, with his family in 1978.

He started his political career in the Christian Democratic youth organisation. From 1978 he was employed by the party, first as ombudsman for the local Christian Democratic Youth, and from 1981 for the regional party branch. From 1982 to 1986 he was also a member of the Municipal Council in Jönköping.

Following the 1985 elections, he began work as parliamentary secretary for the Christian Democrats. He temporarily left politics in 1988, to start working for an insurance company. In the parliamentary elections of 1991 he was elected a Member of Parliament.

Hägglund became the Riksdag's Father of the House on 1 January 2015, being the eldest among those first elected in 1991.

=== Party leader ===
Hägglund was generally considered to be long-time party leader Alf Svensson's personal favourite as a successor. However, when Svensson announced his plans to step down, two other candidates, Maria Larsson and Mats Odell, had the support of a greater number of regional party organisations. Not even Hägglund's own Jönköping district stood behind him. Eventually, however, all Hägglund's possible contenders withdrew from the race, and his election as party leader on 3 April 2004 was unanimous.

Prior to the Swedish general election in 2006 Hägglund's Christian Democrats formed a closer alliance with the three other centre-right parties in Sweden, under the name Alliance for Sweden. After their victory in the elections, Fredrik Reinfeldt of the Moderate Party was asked by the Speaker of the Riksdag to form a new government. Following negotiations between the leaders of the parties in the Alliance for Sweden, Göran Hägglund was named Minister for Social Affairs on 6 October 2006.

In the autumn of 2011 he was challenged for the post of party leader by colleague Mats Odell. In an extra congress held on 28 January 2012, Odell's challenge failed and Hägglund retained the party leadership.

During a party rally in Gothenburg in 2014, Hägglund was hit with a pie by an LGBT rights activist.

On 29 January 2015, Hägglund announced that he would step down as party leader at an extra party congress on 25 April. Ebba Busch Thor was elected the new party leader at that congress.

== Minister for Social Affairs ==
Hägglund was appointed Minister for Social Affairs on 6 October 2006 by Prime Minister Fredrik Reinfeldt.

As minister, Hägglund enforced several reforms including the reform of the health insurance system which became a highly controversial reform. Hägglund also implemented municipal allowance which replaced the former state allowance. The pharmacy monopoly was abolished on 1 July 2009, and the alcohol law was liberalized in 2010. Deduction for household services, so-called RUT deduction was introduced in 2007 as well as the legislation of same-sex marriages in 2009. The bill was supported by all parties except the Christian Democrats and one member of the Center Party.

== Personal life ==
Hägglund grew up in the Pentecostal movement, but is now a member of the Church of Sweden. He is married and has two children.

== Honours ==
- (Sweden) H. M. The King's Medal, 12th size, worn on the ribbon of the Order of the Seraphim (6 June 2026)

Party political offices
New office	Group Leader of the Christian Democrats in the Swedish Riksdag; 1991–2002	Succeeded by Stefan Attefall
Preceded by Anders Andersson	Second Deputy Party Leader of the Christian Democrats; 2003–2004	Succeeded by Mats Odell
Preceded by Alf Svensson	Leader of the Christian Democrats; 2004 – 2015	Succeeded by Ebba Busch Thor
Political offices
Preceded by Berit Andnor	Head of the Ministry of Health and Social Affairs; 2006–2014	Succeeded by Annika Strandhäll
Preceded by Berit Andnor	Minister for Social Affairs; 2006–2014	Succeeded by Gabriel Wikström (as Minister for Public Health, Healthcare and Sports)
Honorary titles
Preceded by Per Westerberg	President by age 2014–2015	Succeeded by Krister Örnfjäder
