= Annika Strandhäll =

Swedish politician (born 1975)

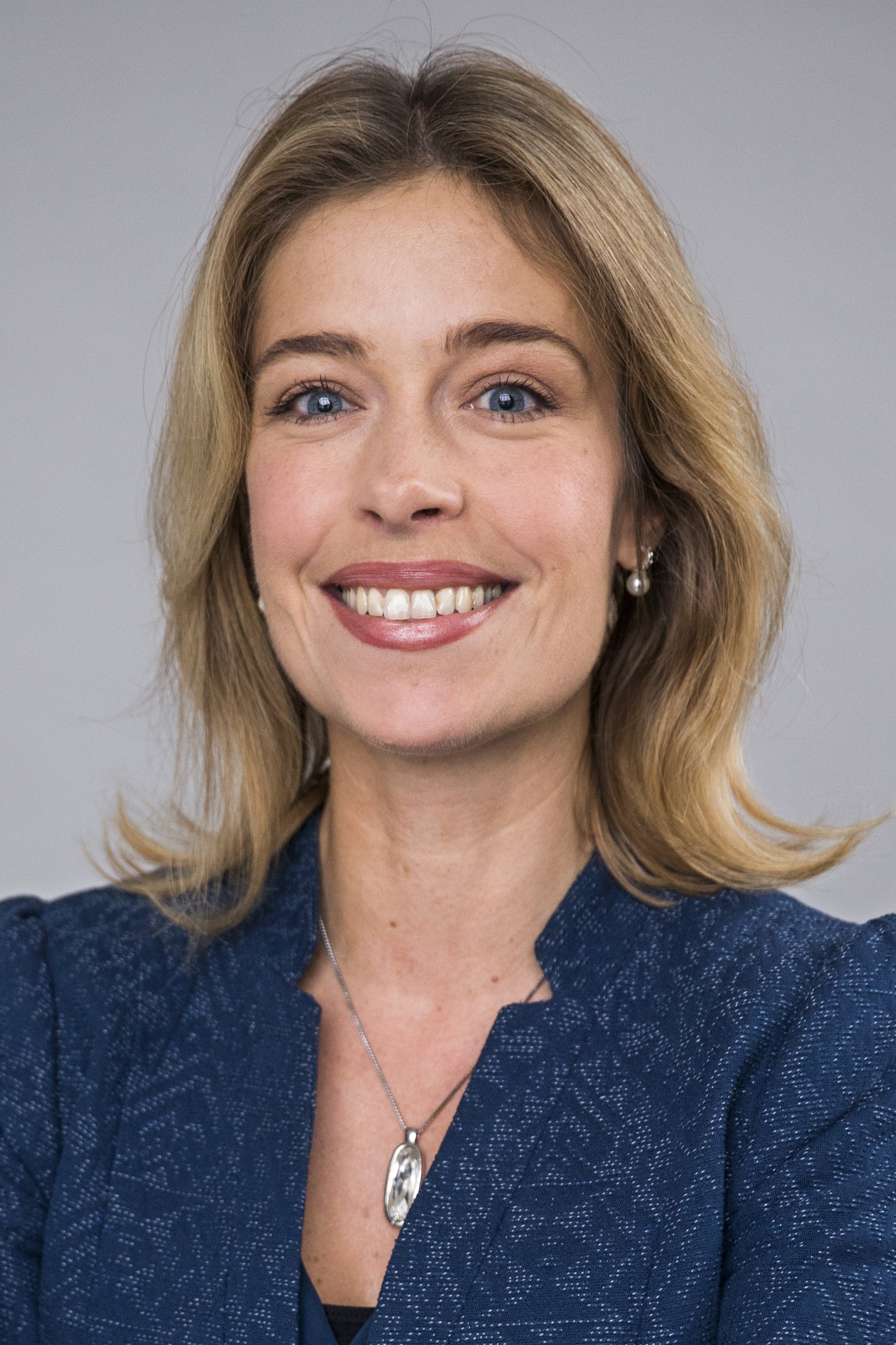
- Annika Strandhäll in October 2014

Minister for Climate and the Environment
- In office 30 November 2021 – 17 October 2022
- Prime Minister: Magdalena Andersson
- Preceded by: Per Bolund
- Succeeded by: Romina Pourmokhtari

Minister for Social Security
- In office 3 October 2014 – 1 October 2019
- Prime Minister: Stefan Löfven
- Preceded by: Ulf Kristersson
- Succeeded by: Ardalan Shekarabi

Minister for Social Affairs
- In office 27 July 2017 – 21 January 2019
- Prime Minister: Stefan Löfven
- Preceded by: Gabriel Wikström (as Minister for Public Health, Healthcare and Sports)
- Succeeded by: Lena Hallengren (as Minister for Health and Social Affairs); Amanda Lind (as Minister for Sports)

Minister for Public Health, Healthcare and Sports (acting)
- In office 5 May 2017 – 27 July 2017
- Prime Minister: Stefan Löfven
- Preceded by: Gabriel Wikström
- Succeeded by: Herself (as Minister for Social Affairs)

Member of the Riksdag
- In office 1 October 2019 – 30 November 2021

Personal details
- Born: 30 June 1975 (age 51) Gothenburg, Sweden
- Party: Social Democratic

Annika Strandhäll (born 30 April 1975) is a Swedish trade unionist and politician of the Social Democrats. She served as Minister for Climate and the Environment from 2021 to 2022. She also served as Minister for Social Security from 2014 until her resignation in 2019, following her partner's death a month earlier. She previously held the office of Minister for Social Affairs from 2017 to 2019. and acting Minister for Public Health, Healthcare and Sports, during Gabriel Wikström's sick leave, from May to July 2017.

== Resignation ==
On 30 September 2019, following the death of her partner, Strandhäll announced that she would be resigning from her post as Minister for Social Security. In February 2020, Strandhäll spoke publicly in a television interview and on Facebook about her partner Thomas Wolf, the father of her two children, having committed suicide after their separation. Wolf had been a high-ranking officer at the government-run insurance agency. Strandhäll said that although she had known he was suffering from depression already prior to their separation, she had not realised the gravity of the situation. She told newspaper Expressen that she intended to remain in politics as an MP, but that her new situation with full responsibility for the children was going to have an impact on any future commitments. Strandhäll said that she spoke publicly about Wolf's passing in order to end speculation about the cause of the tragedy and that it was the right time after several months of grief.

Trade union offices
Preceded by Eva Nordmark (as President of SKTF)	President of Vision; 2011–2014	Succeeded by Veronica Magnusson
Political offices
Preceded by Göran Hägglund	Head of the Ministry for Health and Social Affairs; 2014–2019	Succeeded by Lena Hallengren
Preceded by Ulf Kristersson	Minister for Social Security; 2014–2019	Succeeded by Ardalan Shekarabi
Preceded by Gabriel Wikström	Minister for Public Health, Healthcare and Sports; Acting; 2017	Succeeded by Herself (as Minister for Social Affairs)
Preceded by Herself (as Minister for Social Security); Gabriel Wikström (as Minister for Public Health, Healthcare and Sports)	Minister for Social Affairs; 2017–2019	Succeeded by Lena Hallengren (as Minister for Health and Social Affairs); Amanda Lind (as Minister for Sports)
Preceded by Per Bolund	Minister for Climate and the Environment; 2021–2022	Succeeded by Romina Pourmokhtari
