= Andrea Törnestam =

Swedish politician (born 1991)

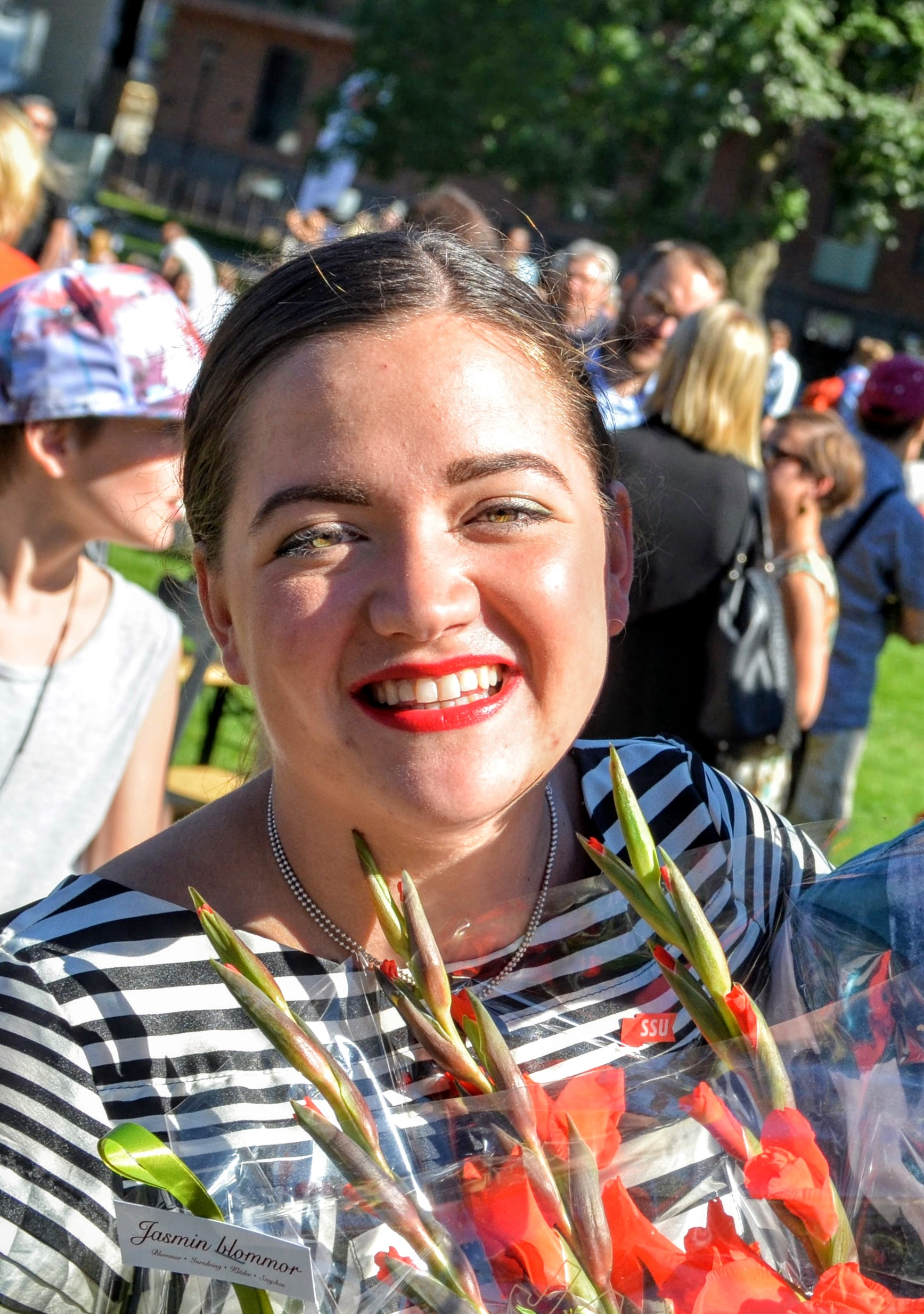
- Törnestam in 2015

Personal details
- Born: 17 June 1991 (age 35) Oscar Parish, Stockholm, Sweden
- Party: Swedish Social Democratic Party

Andrea Corona Törnestam (born 17 June 1991) is a Swedish politician of the Swedish Social Democratic Party. She served as union secretary for the Swedish Social Democratic Youth League from 2015 to 2021. Additionally she served as a substitute member of the Swedish parliament in 2022 in place of Annika Strandhäll for the Stockholm Municipality constituency.
