= Swedish Social Democratic Youth League =

Youth League for the Swedish Social Damocratic Party

Swedish Social Democratic Youth League Sveriges Socialdemokratiska Ungdomsförbund
- Chairperson: Moska Hassas
- Secretary General: Lotta Wiechell
- Founded: 28 October 1917; 108 years ago
- Headquarters: Stockholm, Sweden
- Membership: 10,000+ (2026)
- Ideology: Social democracy; Democratic socialism
- Mother party: Swedish Social Democratic Party
- International affiliation: International Union of Socialist Youth
- European affiliation: Young European Socialists
- Nordic affiliation: Forbundet Nordens Socialdemokratiske Ungdom (FNSU)
- Website: www.ssu.se

The Swedish Social Democratic Youth League (Swedish: Sveriges Socialdemokratiska Ungdomsförbund [ˈsvæ̌rjɛs sʊsɪˈɑ̂ːldɛmʊˌkrɑːtɪska ˈɵ̂ŋdʊmsfœrˌbɵnd]; abbr. SSU) is a branch of the Swedish Social Democratic Party and the Swedish Trade Union Confederation in Sweden. The president has been Moska Hassas, since August 2025.

== Organization ==
The members form local clubs, but also belong to a municipal organisation (SSU-kommun) that are grouped together in regional organisations, in general following the county subdivisions, with the exceptions Stockholm County (two districts: Stockholm and Stockholms Län) and Västra Götaland County (five districts: Fyrbodal, Göteborg, Göteborgsområdet, Södra Älvsborg, Skaraborg).

Every second year, the national organisation holds a congress, adopting policy documents and electing a national Board. The national head office is situated in Södermalm in central Stockholm.

The Swedish Social Democratic Youth League belongs to the Young European Socialists (YES) and the International Union of Socialist Youth (IUSY).

== History ==
=== Beginning ===
The Youth League was established in 1917 after the former Youth League, the Social Democratic Youth (SDUF), in the party split and formed the Swedish Social Democratic Left. That division was between the left and right factions that the social democracy across Europe went through. Per Albin Hansson led the fight against Zeth Höglund and the left wing that had won a majority at the SDUF Congress 1910 which voted to remove Hansson from the Board. The party's leader and then President Hjalmar Branting supported Hansson, and the party's board demanded a loyalty statement from the Youth League. The Youth League did not accept the statement's wording requiring it to be "...ready at all times to promote the party's activities in full compliance with the party and its subdivisions decisions", because the organisation believed this was intended to silence opposition within the party. They called this ultimatum a Muzzled Charter. Then the split came, and the Youth League was forced to leave the party when a majority (136 votes against 42) at the Social Democratic Party Congress in 1917, voted in favour of Brant's proposal and adopted a resolution which separated the then the Youth League from the Social Democratic Party SAP.

A new Youth League, the Swedish Social Democratic Youth League (SSU), was formed at the Congress 27–28 October 1917 when 45 representatives met in Stockholm people's houses. The participants included Per Albin Hansson, and Gustav Möller. One of the major points in Congress was the issue of women's suffrage.

=== 1930s ===
SSU's membership grew during the crisis years in the 1930s. Recognising that the members should be trained, it purchased a farm at Bommersvik in order to form a union school. During this period, SSU had over 100,000 members.

=== 1940s ===
By the 1940s, SSU became a national, fully functioning organization, and became closer to its parent organization. SSU criticized fascism during the 1940s, helped refugees and had lectures about fascist crimes. Willy Brandt lectured on the subject of Bommersvik.

=== 1950s ===
The big question for SSU during the 1950s was whether Sweden should have nuclear weapons. Bertil Löfberg argued in favour of atomic weapons, and was opposed by Oskar Lindkvist. The party made efforts to reform itself during this period, and tried to build a folkhemmet, a concept similar to that of the Welfare State. SSU began to campaign on ways to solve the housing crisis, and ideas about housing policies that led to 'one million program' began to emerge.

=== 1960s ===
The presidents Ingvar Carlsson (1961–1967) and Bosse Ringholm (1967–1972) characterized this period as a time of success for Sweden, and social reforms could proceed rapidly. During this time, international issues became important, because SSU saw great injustice, especially abroad. It criticized foreign dictatorships and wars, including the Vietnam War. SSU felt obliged to fight for democratic socialism. Ringholm said about this time: "An important task for SSU was to keep clean to the left and ensure that SSU is not ground into sects to the left of social democracy". The Federal Board did not agree on how to respond to the Vietnam War.

Everyone wanted to criticize the U.S., but Ingvar Carlsson and Ringholm wanted at the same time not be associated with the Communists in North Vietnam. Olof Palme believed that there was no risk that SSU would be misunderstood. The Board decided not to give any directives, but left it to each member / municipality / district to himself to decide whether it wanted to demonstrate against the Communists.

=== 1970s ===
After the left wing lost several congresses in 1972, they started organizing themselves as the Thursday Club. Thursday Club's name came from the 40 left-wing delegates who met on a Thursday in Congress in 1972 and decided to maintain contact, including through political seminars, until the next congress. After a while, this group dispersed and a small group began to gather behind the newspaper offensive, which started in 1973. In 1976, it was revealed that secret Trotskyist activities had occurred within the SSU, but it would take four years before this could be proved. The proof finally came when two female members independently told the Board. Lars Engqvist, SSU's President 1972–1978, campaigned in the SSU to try to get a majority vote for an exclusion of these people but the evidence was not strong enough. In the autumn of 1976, seven members were excluded.

At the Congress in 1978, enforced decisions about exclusion and a debate began on the offensive. The question of whether they were in the SSU shared federation. Lars Engqvist severely criticized an offensive in Congress. The board was shown to have a clear majority for exclusion. 1975–1977 was Jerry Smith, president of the IUSY, was the first Swede to the post and was elected to Congress in Brussels in Belgium. Nuclear energy was a major political issue in the 1970s, which would later lead to a referendum in 1980.

=== 1980s ===
In 1980, it was clear that the hidden organization existed and that it had about 100 members of the organization in ten departments, and three people who worked full-time for the organization. Chairman Jan Nygren (1978–1984) said: "It was pure James Bond story. In one of the papers, I saw my own name and a report on a conversation with me. It was about SSU's military service activities and how we would activate SSU: are in the military. Then I could understand mentally that it was not something Fuales". Some exclusions came as a result. Lars Engqvist and later Jan Nygren stressed that they were not trying to silence the opposition. The Congress in 1981, it was established that they had to clear out Trotskyists from SSU.

The left-wing was afraid that a purge would be used by the right-wing to remove those that the latter did not like. Over 100 members were excluded. The Congress in 1981 was also the basis for a compromise between the factions in SSU. Bo Bernhardsson won the vote on the Federal secretarial post. Chairman Jan Nygren, who was re-elected, and Bernhardsson came after some mutual distrust, cooperated and fighting in the Federation calmed down. This solution was repeated at the 2005 congress when the president and secretary were taken from a separate wing in order to calm conflicts in the organization.

The Mother Party decided to exclude the same on the party's meeting in April 1982. SSU published a book, 'Entrismen in Sweden 'of the SSU' by Anders Lidström and Henry Ohlsson where it criticized the newspaper offensive. At the 1984 Congress, Anna Lindh was elected new president. Her time as chairman was marked by peace in League and she was SSU's first female president. She received SSU to test new methods to change society. 1989 had the International Union of Socialist Youth (IUSY) Congress on Bommersvik. Sven Eric Söder was elected president of the IUSY for the years 1989–1991.

=== 1990s ===
At the 1990 Congress, Karl-Petter Thorwaldsson was elected chairman. The internal fighting was not strong. The right-wing won an election in 1991, and SSU was in opposition. Between 1991 and 1993, SSU's membership increased. I Sec (then Czechoslovakia) 1991 Roger Hallberg was elected president of the IUSY. The country has never had the presidency two terms of office. In 1994, SSU's website was launched.

In 1995, the first Congress in Norrköping elected Niklas Nordstrom as chairman. Also that year, the current conflict between the factions emerged. The party's right-wing wanted to distance itself from communism, for example, by leaving behind the symbols and words that can be related to Communism. This was largely because the Soviet Union had fallen and that abuses in the Eastern Bloc damaged the reputation of democratic socialism. The left-wing thought that it would be contrary to the traditions within the movement; it would be a betrayal of the foundations to move that way. This conflict persisted into the 2000s.

In 1996, the Federal distance from the Socialist newspaper (run by people active from the newspaper Offensive) and decided that membership of the association journal Socialist would be incompatible with membership in SSU. In 1997, at the Congress in Gothenburg, the conflict escalated. Two distinct factions emerged and voting for a Board became intense. The Election Committee could not find a compromise and left-wing vice-chairman Anders Ygeman was forced to leave the Board when the post was abolished.

At Congress in 1999 in Västerås, a left-wing candidate, Luciano Astudillo, from SSU district Skåne, almost became president. Differences between factions and a loaded Congress defeated Astudillo, and Mikael Damberg from Stockholm County SSU-district, won with votes 126-124. The European Union (EU) and European Monetary Union (EMU) were important issues. SSU decided, at an extraordinary congress in 1994, to campaign against Swedish EU membership, but did not run any campaign for a referendum the same year. The union gradually became more positive toward the EU and in 2001 the Congress almost considered approving Swedish EMU membership. For several years, Lisa Pellinge was Secretary-General of the IUSY.

=== 2000s ===
2000 was SSU hosted the International Union of Socialist Youth's World camp in Malmö with approximately 2000 participants. The camp was the largest IUSY had organized to that date. At the 2001 Congress in Portsmouth, Damberg was re-elected, as no other candidate stood. This was a very clear signal against right-wing governance and showed the conflict seriously. What the left-wing most criticized was that programs replaced the 'democratic socialism' with 'social democracy' which was thought an ideological formulation when it seemed clear that SSU was socialist. The right-wing had a large majority in Congress and had a two-thirds majority on the Board. The EMU was again an emotive issue.

SU in 2002 launched its website. On 21 January 2002, party member Fadime Sahindal was murdered by her father in an honor killing. She campaigned for equality and for the rights of young women with foreign backgrounds. In 2003, SSU began a memorial fund in her memory.

In 2003, the European Community Organization of Socialist Youth Congress was held in the Bommersvik. SSU won a battle against French President Youth. Anders Lindberg was elected as the first Swedish president of the Young Socialists.

At the 2003 Congress in Karlstad, right-wing presidential candidate was Ardalan Shekarabi (SSU Uppland) and left-wing candidate Lina Afvander (SSU Jönköping). Afvander withdrew just before the president election on the morning on August 6 when she became the Nomination Committee's proposal, and Shekarabi was elected unanimously. Sara Heelge-Vikmång (SSU Östergötland) was elected Secretary-General. Congress also decided, about one month before the referendum, to offer no opinion on the Swedish introduction of the Euro. In media, it has been claimed that the choice of Shekarabi may have been surrounded by some irregularities, which created some problems for the federation. It was alleged that money from the Development Activities was used to finance Shekarabis's internal election campaign. This may have been one of the factors contributing to the factions seeking more consensus before Congress in 2005.

Shekarabis's writings led to the resignation of Congress in 2005 and the establishment of a future commission that recommended the Congress to share power between the right and left wings. 2004 Anna Sjödin was elected vice-president of the International Union of Socialist Youth in Budapest. In 2004, the party campaigned to ban the fees for school food.

2005 revealed serious errors in SSU's members register. A large number of people were in the register without having paid a membership fee. The police launched an investigation when they suspected benefit fraud because SSU received financial assistance based on its membership. Records were updated and to Congress, the Federal proposed that central members should exercise better control, so that districts could not systematic cheating. The police closed the investigation for benefit fraud because the crime could not be proved and SSU free from all. Also at the 2005 Congress, the Board tried to achieve organizational unity by allowing the two factions to share the board equally. The federal leadership was divided up so that the right-wing got the chair Anna Sjödin and left-wing union secretarial post Mattias Vepsä.

In 2006, Anna Sjödin was re-elected vice-president of the International Union of Socialist Youth Congress in Esbjerg. In December 2006, Sjödin resigned from the presidency after being sentenced for insult, violence against officials, violent resistance and an arbitrary act. She also was sentenced to pay 5,500 Swedish krona in damages. The post of president remained vacant until the next Congress. Secretary Mattias Vepsä was task to be SSU's spokesperson in the meantime to Congress 2007. In January 2007 the Board's new membership figures were announced; it had changed from 20,500 to 4,300. Measures were introduced to prevent cheating, which led to the fall in membership by over two thirds over one and a half years, and SSU was no longer the country's largest political youth league. In May 2007, it published the candidates to Congress in August.

Mattias Vepsä was the only candidate for a federal secretary. Jytte Guteland from the Stockholm County SSU-district and considered right-wing was nominated for the office of Federal. Several right-district support, however, Laila Naraghi from SSU Kalmar Län. There was discontent in parts of the right-wing because the Stockholm County SSU-district and Jytte Guteland's other support district had handled the Inter-democracy poorly. In the spring, it was decided to hold a divided caucus to advocate Jytte Guteland to the Federal SSU. On August 8, at the Congress, Guteland was elected as chairman with 131 votes against 115 for Laila Naraghi.

=== 2010s ===
Gabriel Wikström was elected president in 2011. In October 2014 he became the first serving president of SSU to become appointed a cabinet minister when he got the position of Minister for Public Health, Healthcare and Sports in the Löfven cabinet. Ellinor Eriksson, who served as secretary general, then became acting president of SSU. In August 2015 SSU held its 38th national congress in Västerås. The congress elected Philip Botström as the new president of SSU and Andrea Törnestam as secretary general. The new leadership is elected on a two-year mandate. Botström and Törnestam were elected two more times at the 39th national congress in Älvsjö and 40th national congress in Karlstad.

=== 2020s ===
In January 2021 Philp Botström announced that he was stepping down as president at the next national congress. In July candidates started appearing for the leadership. Two people, Lisa Nåbo and Amalia Rud Pedersen ran for the position of president. Diyar Cicek and Isak Öhrlund ran for the position of secretary general. During the 41st national congress (and the first digital national congress) Lisa Nåbo defeated Amalia Rud Pedersen, who was the Nomination Committee's proposal, with two votes, winning by 114-112. Diyar Cicek was elected secretary general. The election process of the new leadership has been described as the most open in the whole of SSUs history.

At the 43rd national congress in 2025 Moska Hassas was elected president. Lotta Wiechell was elected secretary general.

== Presidents ==
- Harry Svensson (1917–1919)
- Bertil Eriksson (1919–1922)
- Rickard Lindström (1922–1928)
- Adolf Wallentheim (1928–1934)
- Torsten Nilsson (1934–1940)
- Ossian Sehlstedt (1940–1943)
- Bertil Johansson (1943–1946)
- Frans Nilsson (1946–1952)
- Bertil Löfberg (1952–1958)
- Kurt Ward (1958–1961)
- Ingvar Carlsson (1961–1967)
- Bosse Ringholm (1967–1972)
- Lars Engqvist (1972–1978)
- Jan Nygren (1978–1984)
- Anna Lindh (1984–1990)
- Karl-Petter Thorwaldsson (1990–1995)
- Niklas Nordström (1995–1999)
- Mikael Damberg (1999–2003)
- Ardalan Shekarabi (2003–2005)
- Anna Sjödin (2005–2006)
- Mattias Vepsä (provisional, 2006–2007)
- Jytte Guteland (2007–2011)
- Gabriel Wikström (2011–2014)
- Ellinor Eriksson (2014–2015)
- Philip Botström (2015–2021)
- Lisa Nåbo (2021–2025)
- Moska Hassas (2025–present)

== Secretaries ==
- Karl Hovberg (1928–1931)
- Joel Ljungquist (1931–1 April 1935)
- Folke Thunborg (1 April 1935–1940)
- Bertil Johansson (1940–1943)
- Hilding Färm (1943–Feb 1948)
- Essen Lindahl (March 1948–1949)
- Bertil Löfberg (1949–1952)
- Frans Nilsson (1946–1952)
- Bertil Löfberg (1952–1958)
- Oskar Lindkvist (1952–1955)
- Sture Hollman (1955–1958)
- Rune Molin (1958–31 July 1962)
- Sven Hulterström (31 July 1962–1964)
- Thage Pettersson (1964–1967)
- Bo Toresson (1967–31 July 1969)
- Ulf Karlsson (21 April 1969–1972)
- Christer Lindström (1972–1975)
- Håkan Bystedt (1975–1981)
- Bo Bernhardsson (1981–1984)
- Leif Linde (1984–1 October 1988)
- Anders Teljebäck (1 October 1988–1990)
- Lars Ericson (1990–1994)
- Carin Jämtin (1994–1995)
- Pernilla Mobeck (1995–1999)
- Lena Hallengren (1999–21 October 2002)
- Caroline Waldheim (2002–Aug 2003)
- Sara Helge-Vikmång (2003–2005)
- Mattias Vepsä (2005–2011)
- Ellinor Eriksson (2011–2014)
- Rozgar Watmani (2014-2015)
- Andrea Törnestam (2015–2021)
- Diyar Cicek (2021–2025)
- Lotta Wiechell (2025–present)
