= Laila Naraghi =

Swedish politician (born 1982)

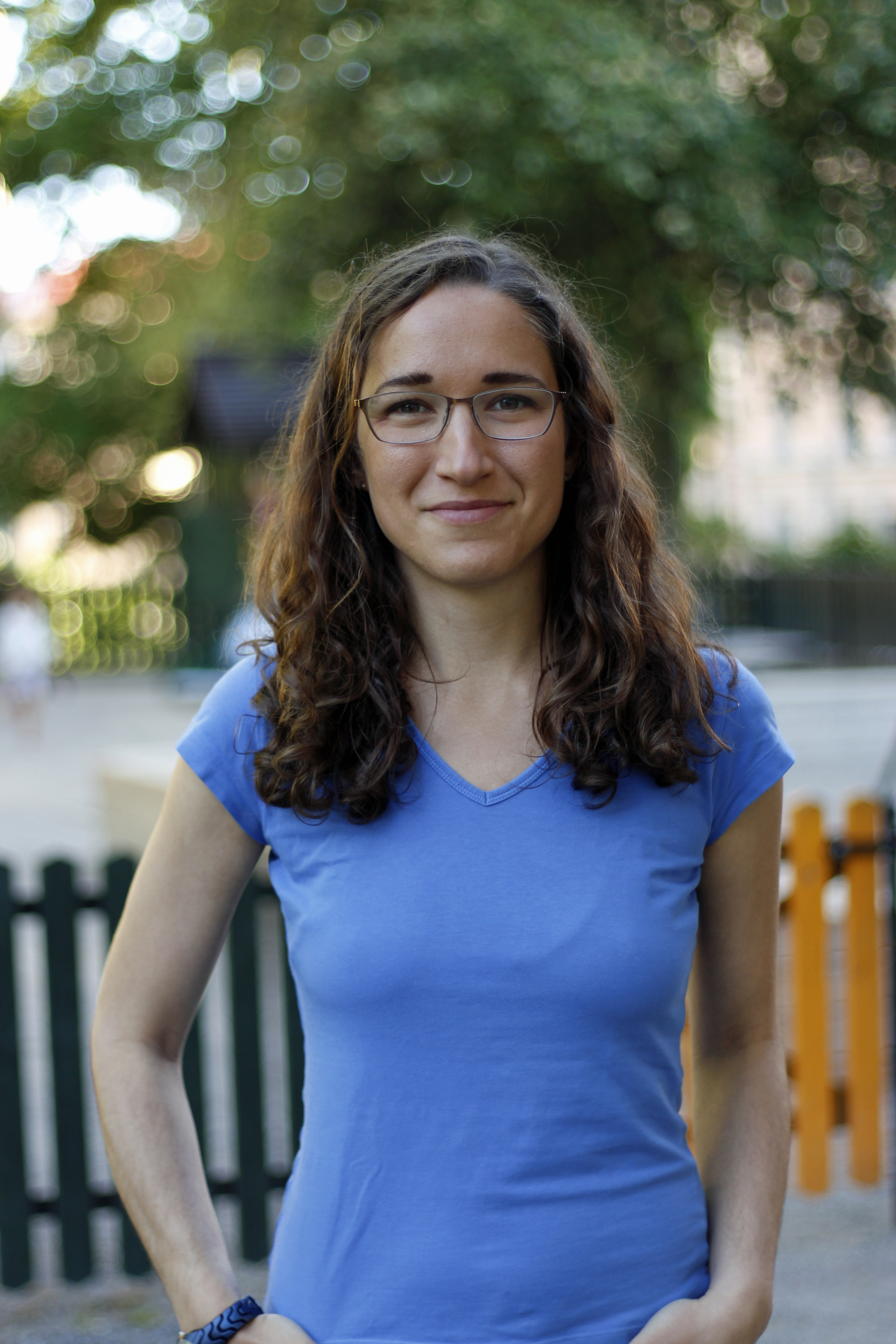
Laila Naraghi

Laila Helena Naraghi (born 29 June 1982 in Iran) is a Swedish politician of Persian origin from the Social Democratic Party and a member of the Swedish Parliament.

== Biography ==
Naraghi was raised in Oskarshamn, Sweden. She joined the Swedish Social Democratic Youth League (SSU) at the age of 14. At the SSU congress in 2007, she sought the chairmanship of the SSU, but lost to Jytte Guteland with a vote of 131 to 115.

She studied in Swedish Defence University getting her bachelor's degree in political science with a focus on crisis management and international cooperation. In 2012 she has been in the Swedish UN Association Board. She worked at the Olof Palme International Center from 2009 to 2014 and a board member of Olof Palmes Memorial Fund.

In the parliamentary elections in 2014, she was the candidate of the Swedish Social Democratic Party for the Kalmar län (Kalmar County), but failed to be elected. She was also temporary chairman of the Board of Education in Oskarshamn between May and October 2014. Between 2014 and 2016, she served as a political expert at the Swedish Foreign Ministry under Foreign Minister Margot Wallström. Since September 2016 she is a Member of Riksdag, the Swedish Parliament.
