= Ellinor Eriksson =

Swedish Social Democratic politician

Anna Ellinor Eriksson
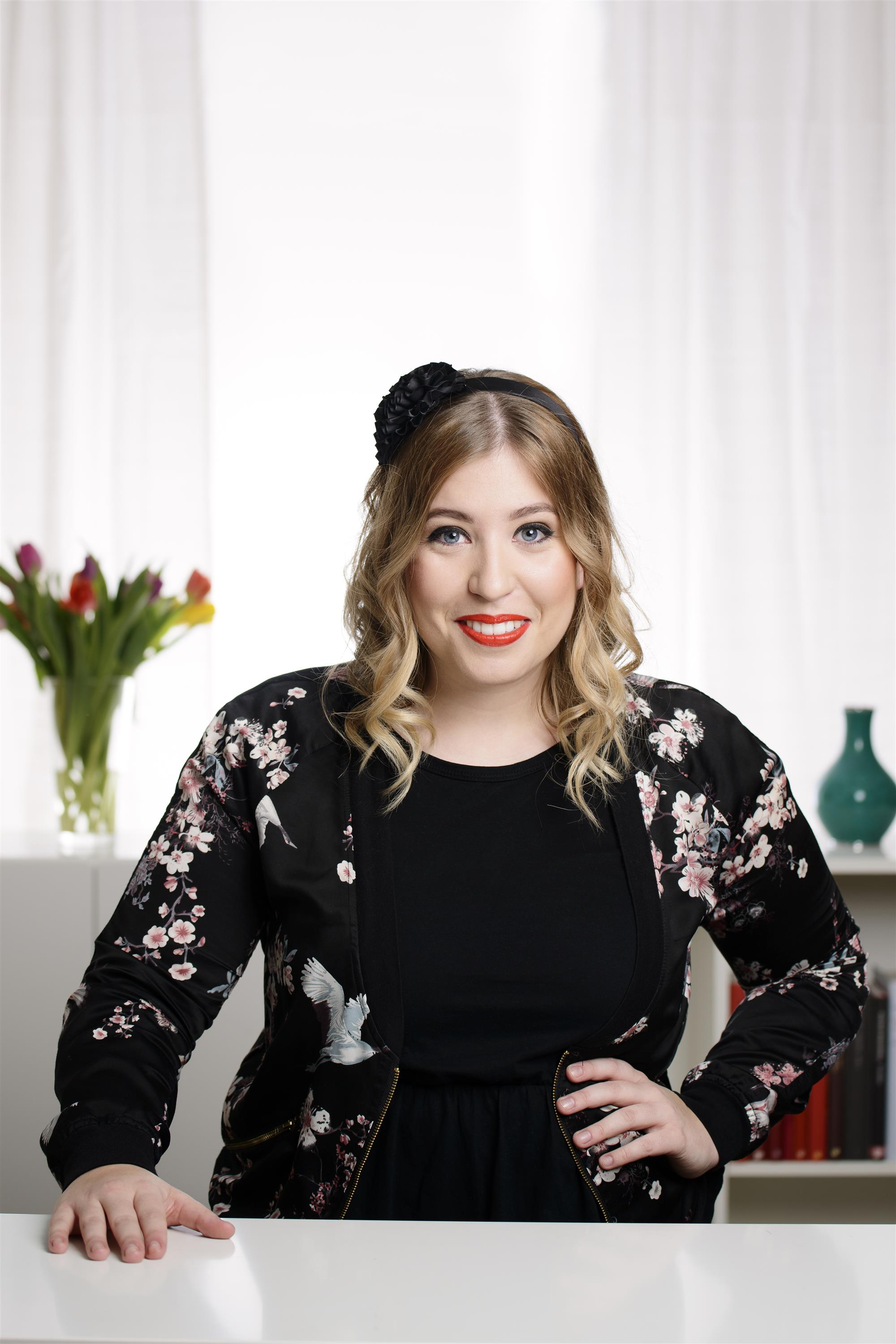

Personal details
- Party: Swedish Social Democratic Party

Anna Ellinor Eriksson (born 10 June 1988) is a Swedish psychologist and a former Social Democratic politician. She was leader of the Swedish Social Democratic Youth League (SSU) from 2014 to 2015. In 2026, she is one of four instructors for the participants in the second season of Elitstyrkans hemligheter VIP, the Swedish version of the TV show SAS: Who Dares Wins (the celebrity version).

Eriksson served as general secretary of SSU from 2011 to October 2014 when she replaced Gabriel Wikström as leader, following his appointment as Minister for Public Health, Healthcare and Sports of in the Löfven Cabinet. Eriksson has studied psychology at Karolinska Institutet and graduated in 2018. She lives in Stockholm.

== Early life and career ==
Born in Valbo in East Central Sweden, she joined SSU at 15. Eriksson served as one of ten vice presidents of the Young European Socialists for the period 2013–2015.

In the 2014 European Parliament election in Sweden she was in the 7th spot on the Swedish Social Democratic Party list and received 17 728 personal votes; the party obtained five seats.
