= Lisa Nåbo =

Swedish politician

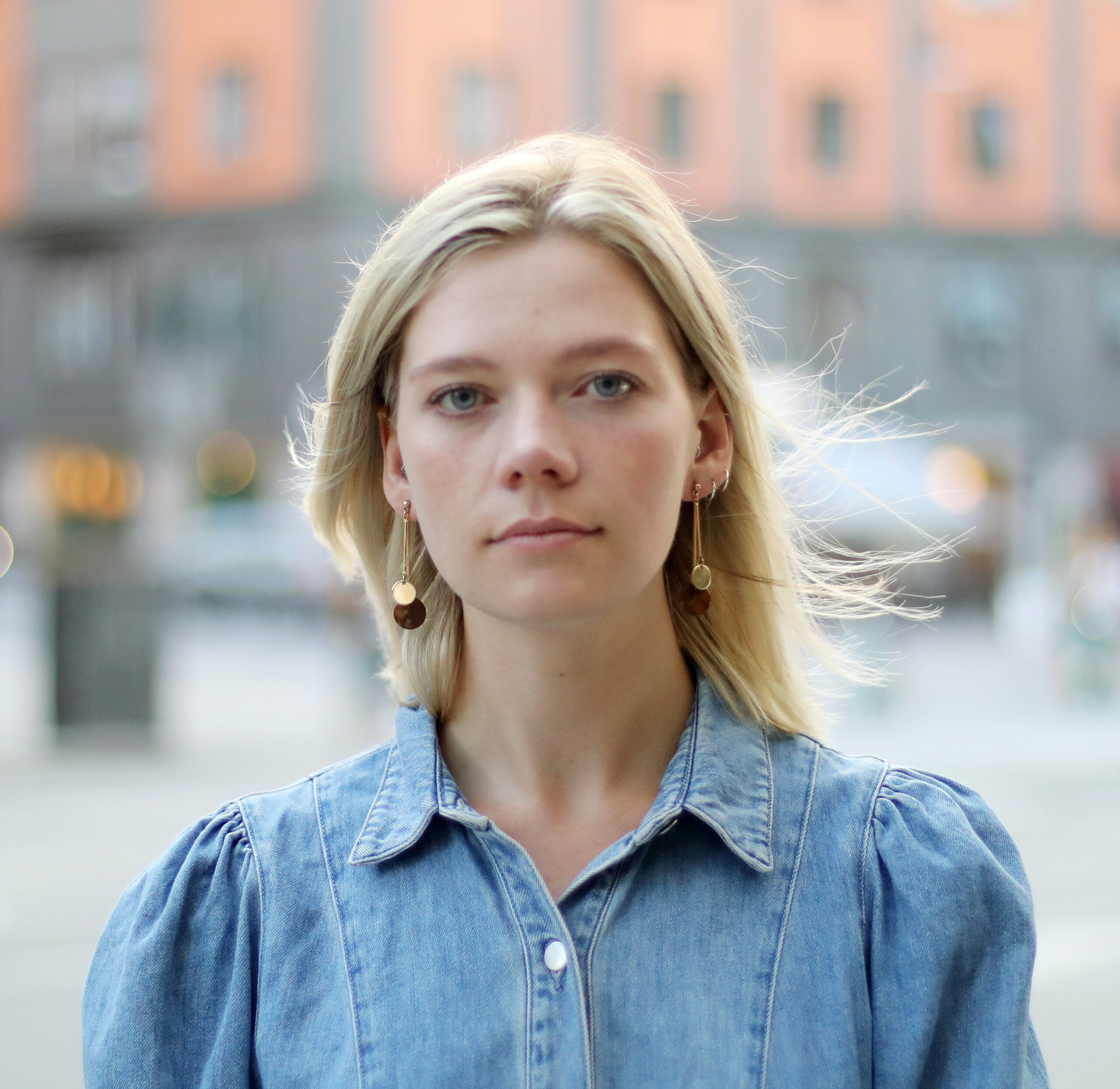
Lisa Nåbo in 2021

Lisa Maria Lucia Johansson Nåbo (born 27 November 1994) is a Swedish politician for the Social Democrats. She has been the leader of the party's youth branch SSU since 1 August 2021, and was a member of the municipality council in Linköping between 2018 and 2021. In 2016, Nåbo spent two months in Yangoon, Myanmar, while volunteering at a school.
