= Swedish Inheritance Fund =

The Swedish Inheritance Fund (Swedish: Allmänna arvsfonden) is a Swedish State fund, established in 1928 when the Riksdag decided to abolish the right of inheritance for cousins and more distant relatives. When a person in Sweden dies without a written will and no living spouse or close family, their property is transferred to the fund; the fund also receives money from gifts and wills. The purpose of the fund is to support non-profit organizations and other voluntary associations. The fund is administered by the Swedish Legal, Financial and Administrative Services Agency. Applications for grants from the fund, however, are reviewed and decided by the Swedish Inheritance Fund Commission, an agency that answers to the Ministry for Health and Social Affairs.

The Swedish Interitance Fund receives properties from around 600 individuals each year. One of its largest additions was reported in January 2007, when the fund received 68 million kronor from the estate of 86-year-old man in a village outside Umeå in northern Sweden, much to the surprise of his neighbours.

The only other country with a state-governed inheritance fund is Iceland.

== See also ==
- Government agencies in Sweden
