= Anna Tenje =

Swedish politician (born 1977)

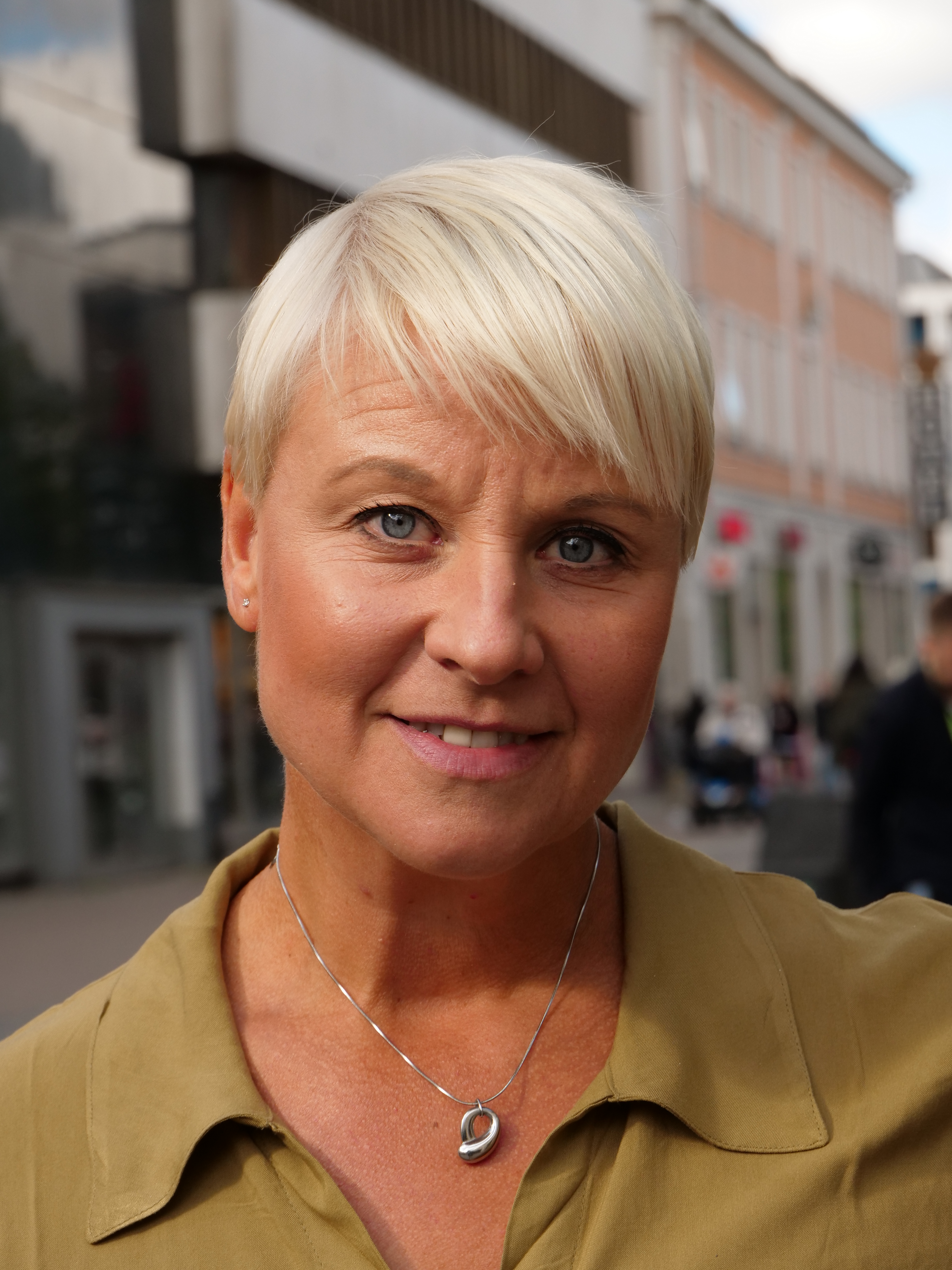
- Tenje in 2022

Minister for Older People and Social Security
- Incumbent
- Assumed office 18 October 2022
- Monarch: Carl XVI Gustaf
- Prime Minister: Ulf Kristersson
- Preceded by: Ardalan Shekarabi

Second Deputy Leader of the Moderate Party
- Incumbent
- Assumed office 19 October 2019
- Leader: Ulf Kristersson
- Preceded by: Elisabeth Svantesson

Mayor of Växjö
- In office 1 January 2017 – 23 November 2022
- Preceded by: Bo Frank
- Succeeded by: Malin Lauber

Member of the Riksdag
- In office 2 October 2006 – 4 October 2010
- Constituency: Kronoberg County

Personal details
- Born: Anna Jenny Carolina Bergkvist; 22 October 1977 (age 48) Värnamo, Sweden
- Party: Moderate Party

Anna Jenny Caroline Tenje (née Bergkvist; born 22 October 1977) is a Swedish politician of the Moderate Party. She has served as Minister for Older People and Social Security since 18 October 2022 in the cabinet of Ulf Kristersson.

Anna Tenje was a member of the Riksdag from 2006 to 2010 representing Kronoberg County. In 2011, she was appointed municipal commissioner of Växjö serving as chairman of the technical board (2011–2014) and as chairman of the education board (2015–2016). On 1 January 2017, she became Governing Mayor, serving until she was appointed to the Kristersson cabinet. She also serves as Deputy Leader of the Moderate Party, along with Elisabeth Svantesson, since 2019.

Party political offices
Preceded by Elisabeth Svantesson	Second Deputy Leader of the Moderate Party; 2019–present	Incumbent
Political offices
Preceded by Ardalan Shekarabi	Minister for Older People and Social Security; 2022–present	Incumbent
