= Social security in Sweden =

Social security in Sweden is an aspect of the Swedish welfare system and consists of various social insurances handled by the National Agency for Social Insurance (Swedish: Försäkringskassan), and welfare provided based on need by local municipalities. Social security is the main conduit for redistribution of approximately 20% of the Swedish GDP mainly in the form of income taxes, Payroll taxes and Value added taxes.

== Family policy ==
Family policy for Swedish social security has undertaken a series of reforms. Initially, the policy aimed to encourage Swedish youth to marry and build families. The whole family policy consists of three parts: parental benefits, child allowance and public daycare.

=== Parental benefit ===
Families receive up to a maximum of 480 days (16 months) paid parental leave, föräldrapenning, with an optional additional three months unpaid leave, and ten days of leave after the birth of a child for fathers. Regulations require each parent to take at least two months leave, but in reality, some fathers do not take leave at all. In this case the policy is implemented on a "use it or lose it" basis and the parental leave time will drop from 16 months to 14 months if unused by one parent. The leave can be used intermittently and for parts of days, but must be expended before the child is eight years of age. Parents are paid an approximate 80% of their pay for the first 390 days, and in the remaining 90 days, receive a flat rate of SEK 180 per day. The rate for unemployed parents is SEK 180 per day for the entirety of their parental leave.

During the 1982 campaign and the subsequent Palme Government (1982-1986), family policy focused on expanding and consolidating the parental leave insurance policy, as to increase women's participation in the labor force, increase fertility, and ensure gender-neutrality in the legislation. Parental leave insurance policy had first been introduced in 1974, with leave duration having been increased incrementally to twelve months by 1980. This expansion was later reinforced under Palme's second term as part of a broader welfare-state consolidation agenda.The Social Democratic party emphasized that parental leave, financed through earnings-related insurance, enabled women to maintain labor market participation while caring for children, aligning with Sweden’s gender-neutral entitlement approach to the dual-earner welfare model.

Despite encouragement from Social Democratic women's organizations to introduce quotas for fathers, the official stance of Palme's government remained that leave division was a "private family decision" rather than a matter for state-mandated quotas, reflecting the party's framing of domestic equality as a private rather than political issue throughout the decade. Subsequent scholarship has argued that this reliance on voluntary sharing and inducements, rather than binding rules, helped entrench gendered patterns of caregiving, and that the debates of the 1980s provided the backdrop for the later introduction of reserved "daddy months" in the 1990s.

Fathers in Sweden, on average, do not utilize all of their entitled parental leave time. Only about 25% of Swedish companies note that at least 61% of Swedish fathers use more than 12 weeks of leave. The amount of parental leave time utilized by fathers in Sweden correlates with relationship status, with single fathers, on average, utilizing less of their parental leave time than fathers with partners do. In a study published in Demographic Research, it was found that those fathers who utilize more parental leave tend to have a higher likelihood of fathering a second child in the future, while the possibility for a future third child decreases with additional parental leave time used. The amount of parental leave taken by fathers living in Sweden also correlates with their specific desire to do so. On average, those fathers who simply desire to be home with their child take the longest leave of nearly twenty weeks. As noted in Father's quota, the overall amount of parental leave allowed has been changed over time.

From 2023 to 2024, the number of parents receiving parental leave benefits in Sweden increased from 835,609 to 851,171. Amendments enacted on July 1, 2024, created the possibility for other individuals, such as relatives and friends, to utilize portions of the parental leave benefits. Single parents can transfer over up to 90 days of leave to others, while partnered-parents can transfer over 45 days each. With the amendments, couples are also able to simultaneously use their parental leave benefits for up two months.

Parents receive up to a maximum of 120 days (four months) of leave to take care of sick children every year, in addition to a childcare allowance, vårdbidrag, to enable parents to stay at home and care for children with long-term illnesses.

Parental leave in Sweden is job-protected, meaning parents who take the leave have the right to return to the same employer and into the same or an adequate similar position.

Apart from paid leave, parents also receive a whole or partial reimbursement for hospital care, treatment and transportation related to childbirth.

=== Child allowance ===
The child allowance in Sweden started from the General Child Allowance in 1948. Parents in Sweden receive cash benefits to ease the burden of raising children who are under 16 years old, barnbidrag. Generally, Swedish parents receive a flat rate child allowance of SEK 1250 per month for one child, which is tax-exempt. If the family have more than one child qualifying for the child allowance, the family receive SEK 1250 more per child with additional "large family supplement" or flerbarnstillägg. For example, a family with four children under sixteen years of age will receive SEK 5000 child allowance and SEK 1740 large family supplement per month, totaling SEK 6740 per month. This child allowance is financed by the central government's budget and parents do not need to apply for the allowance; it is paid automatically.

Apart from the child allowance, there are other allowances available for families with children. Families with children that pay over SEK 1400 for housing per month will receive a state-rent housing allowance, the level of which is determined by the number of children, the income of the family and the size and rent of the housing. But the income ceiling is set rather high, so that even a family with income well above average is entitled to receive house allowance.

For families with disabled children, they will also receive allowance for car, care and hiring personal assistants.

=== Public day care ===
Public day care in Sweden are for children under seven years old. The daycare centers are run by local municipalities under the guidance of central government. Most municipal preschools are open ten to twelve hours a day to take care of children whose parents work full-time; there are also nighttime daycare centers for parents who work at night. "After the parents apply for placement at a preschool in the municipality where they live, the child is offered a vacancy based on that municipality's queue and admission rules." The reform in 2007 made daycare more affordable; EU/EEA citizens only need to pay a reduced fee for a full-time preschool.

Apart from public daycare, there are also cooperatives run by parents, private child care facilities and family daycare; minders are hired by local municipalities to take care of children in their house. However, public daycare is absolutely the majority. During 1965–1980, the number of child care facilities increased tenfold. Today, over three-quarters of children aged one to five go to publicly supported daycare centers.

== Housing allowance ==
Families with children and people below 29 years of age may be eligible to receive a housing allowance, bostadsbidrag. The amount depends on income, the size of the family, housing costs and house size. At most it is 1,300 SEK.

== Benefits for ill and disabled ==
Working people are entitled to sick pay when ill. The first 14 days (except the first day off) are paid by the employer, the rest by Försäkringskassan. If an employee's ability to work is permanently reduced, disability payments may be made.

If an employee needs time-consuming assistance in everyday life to be able to work or study due to illness or disability, disability allowance or handikappersättning can be obtained. If a person has a substantial and permanent disability and needs assistance with mealtimes, washing, clothing and communicating with others, an allowance, assistansersättning, can be provided to pay for an assistant. If a person has great difficulties in getting about on their own, or in using public transport due to a permanent disability, they can obtain an allowance to purchase a car, make alterations to a car, and to get a driving licence.

== Support for the elderly ==
If an employee has worked in Sweden and earned a taxable work income, they will be entitled to Swedish old age pension, at the earliest age of 61 years. The levels depend on income and how long the employee has worked. There is also a guarantee pension which one is entitled to if they have lived for at least three years in Sweden if they have had no or low income. The elderly can also receive housing supplements or maintenance support. The levels of these depend on one's needs.

== Welfare ==
If a person has no or low income, they can apply for welfare from the local municipality. The municipality will evaluate their economic situation to determine if they should receive welfare or not. The welfare should be enough to cover things like housing, food, clothing and telephone.
