= Philip Botström =

Swedish politician (born 1990)

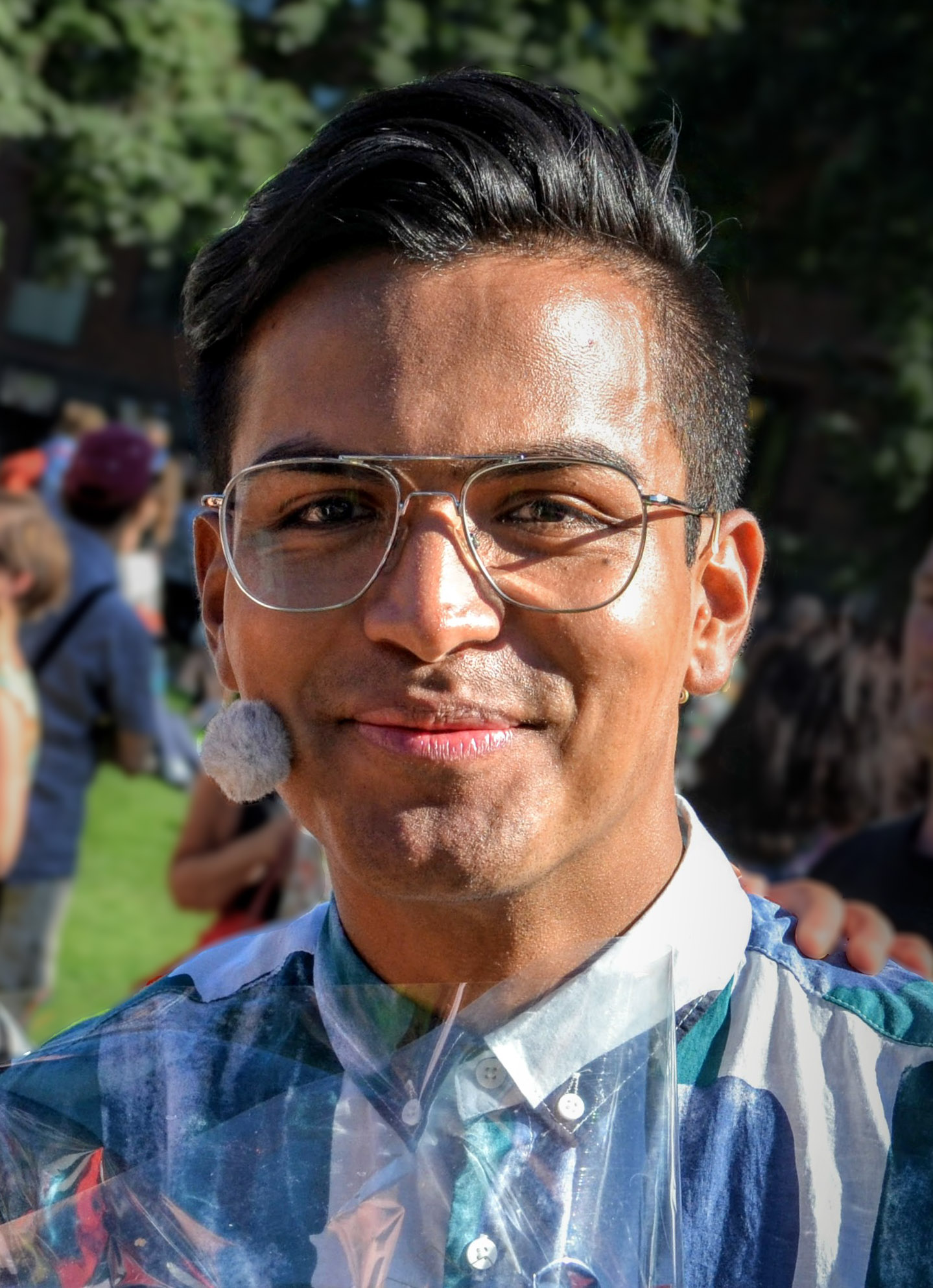
Philip Botström in 2015

Philip Botström (born 1990 in Colombia) was the president of the Swedish Social Democratic Youth League (SSU) from the congress on 9 August 2015 until the congress on 1 August 2021. Botström grew up in Filipstad, Sweden. As president Botström is representing SSU in the party board and the executive board of the Swedish Social Democratic Party.

Philip Botström has expressed that the political goal for his presidency is to make increased equality the main focus in Swedish politics. Investments in infrastructure, schools and an improved situation for young people in the labour market is part of the policy agenda to reach this.

In 2017, Botström was criticized for taking a taxi from Sälen to Stockholm at a cost of SEK 7,900 to attend a meeting the next day. However, he did not attend the meeting and his own explanation was that he had been suffering from exhaustion and burnout symptoms for some time. Only in retrospect did he have to pay for the trip with his own money.
