= Schori =

Schori is a surname. Notable people with the surname include:

- Katharine Jefferts Schori (born 1954), US Episcopal bishop
- Pierre Schori (born 1938), Swedish diplomat and politician
