= Jan O. Karlsson =

Swedish politician (1939–2016)

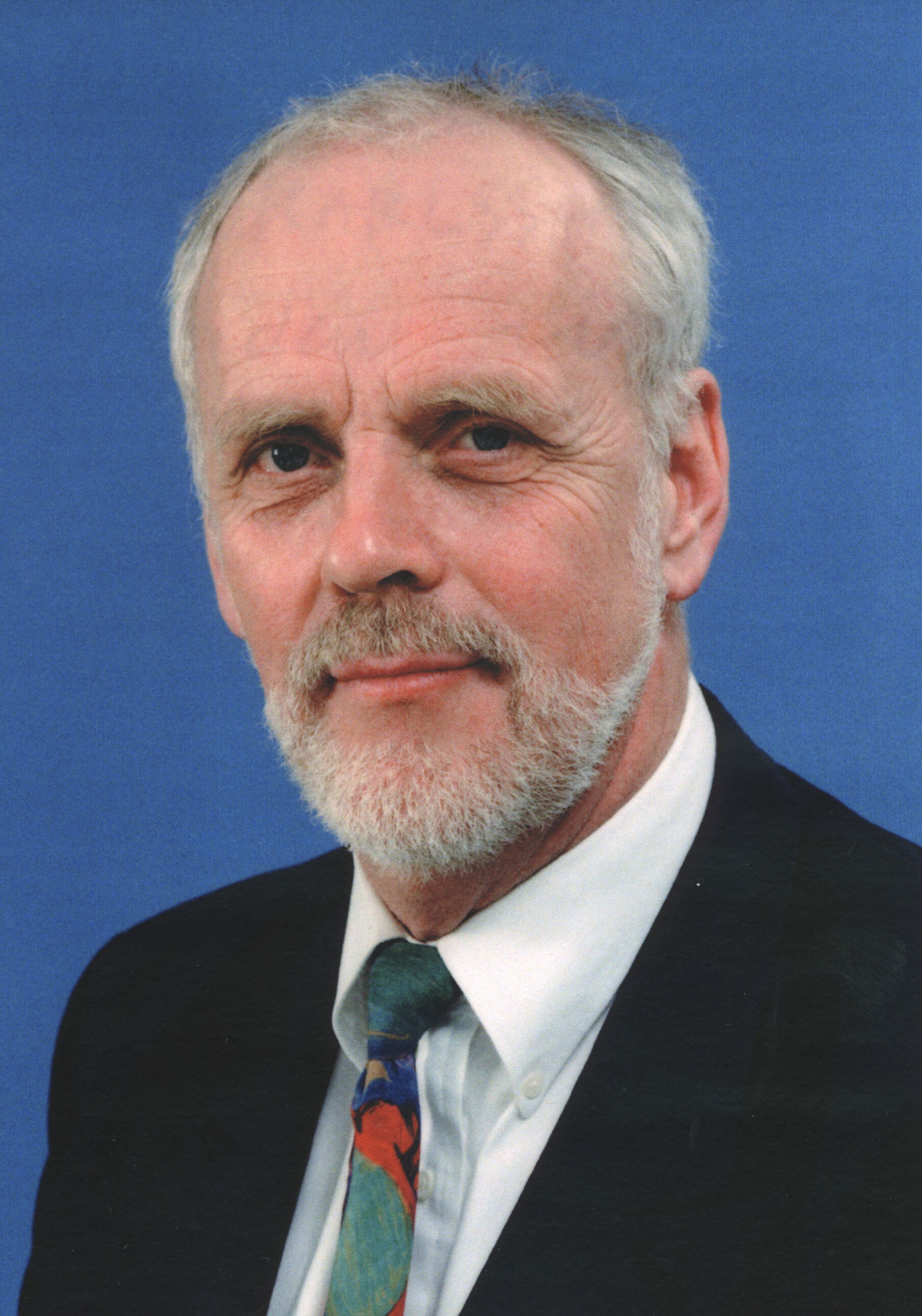
- Karlsson in 1999

Minister for Foreign Affairs Acting
- In office 11 September 2003 – 10 October 2003
- Prime Minister: Göran Persson
- Preceded by: Anna Lindh
- Succeeded by: Laila Freivalds

Minister for International Development Cooperation
- In office 7 January 2002 – 9 October 2003
- Prime Minister: Göran Persson
- Preceded by: Maj-Inger Klingvall
- Succeeded by: Carin Jämtin

Minister for Migration
- In office 2002 – 10 October 2003
- Prime Minister: Göran Persson
- Preceded by: Maj-Inger Klingvall
- Succeeded by: Barbro Holmberg

Justice of the European Court of Auditors
- In office 1995–2001
- Preceded by: Position created
- Succeeded by: Lars Tobisson

Personal details
- Born: Jan Olov Karlsson; 1 June 1939 Stockholm, Sweden
- Died: 19 September 2016 (aged 77) Stockholm, Sweden
- Party: Swedish Social Democratic Party

Jan Olov Karlsson (1 June 1939 – 19 September 2016) was a Swedish politician; former Minister for Development Cooperation, Migration and Asylum Policy (2002-2003) and acting Minister for Foreign Affairs (11 September-10 October 2003), following the murder of Anna Lindh. He also served as President of the European Court of Auditors.

== Career ==
Jan O. Karlsson studied economics, political science and history at Stockholm University, before becoming an undersecretary at the Ministry of Agriculture in 1962. In 1968 he transferred to the Office of the Prime Minister where he worked as an advisor. From 1973 he served as secretary to the Deputy Mayor of Stockholm and in 1977 he became the deputy secretary for the presidency of the Nordic Council. Following the election in 1982 when the Social Democrats returned to power he was made state secretary at the Ministry of Finance. Following the election in 1988 he was instead made chairman for the government commission of inquiry on metropolitan areas, and in 1990 once again advisor and coordinator at the prime minister's Office.

Between 1991 and 1994 when the Social Democrats were in opposition Karlsson worked as an advisor for the party parliamentary group. In the autumn of 1994 the Swedes went to the ballot box on two occasions. The first swept the Social Democrats back to power and in the second Sweden joined the European Union. As a consequence of this Jan O. Karlsson was nominated by the Swedish Government as its representative to the European Court of Auditors in 1995, and on 18 January 1999 he became President of the Court. As the head of a principal organ in the European Union he held one of the most senior position within the European Union, number five in the top hierarchy. He held this position until 31 December 2001 when he resigned after being offered a cabinet post. He died on 19 September 2016 at the age of 77.

== Minister ==
Jan O. Karlsson's tenure as minister was far from smooth, his relation with the local press was troublesome, often attributed to his late father, who also was a high ranking social democratic politician, who died of a heart attack during an interview with a journalist. In spite of a number of minor political scandals – he, among other things, referred to George W. Bush as "that damn Texan geezer" ("den där jävla texasgubben") and abruptly murmured (with a microphone attached to his jacket) "now we better see an end to these fag issues" (nu får det väl vara slut på de här bögfrågorna) during a SIDA conference – he was able to maintain the trust of prime minister Göran Persson and keep his place in the Cabinet. His appointment as acting Minister for Foreign Affairs following the death of Anna Lindh on 11 September 2003, was a short-term solution. Changes in government, effective on 10 October the same year, forced him to resign his post.
