= Legal, Financial and Administrative Services Agency =

Swedish administrative authority under the Ministry of Finance

- Kammarkollegiet
- The coat of arms of Kammarkollegiet

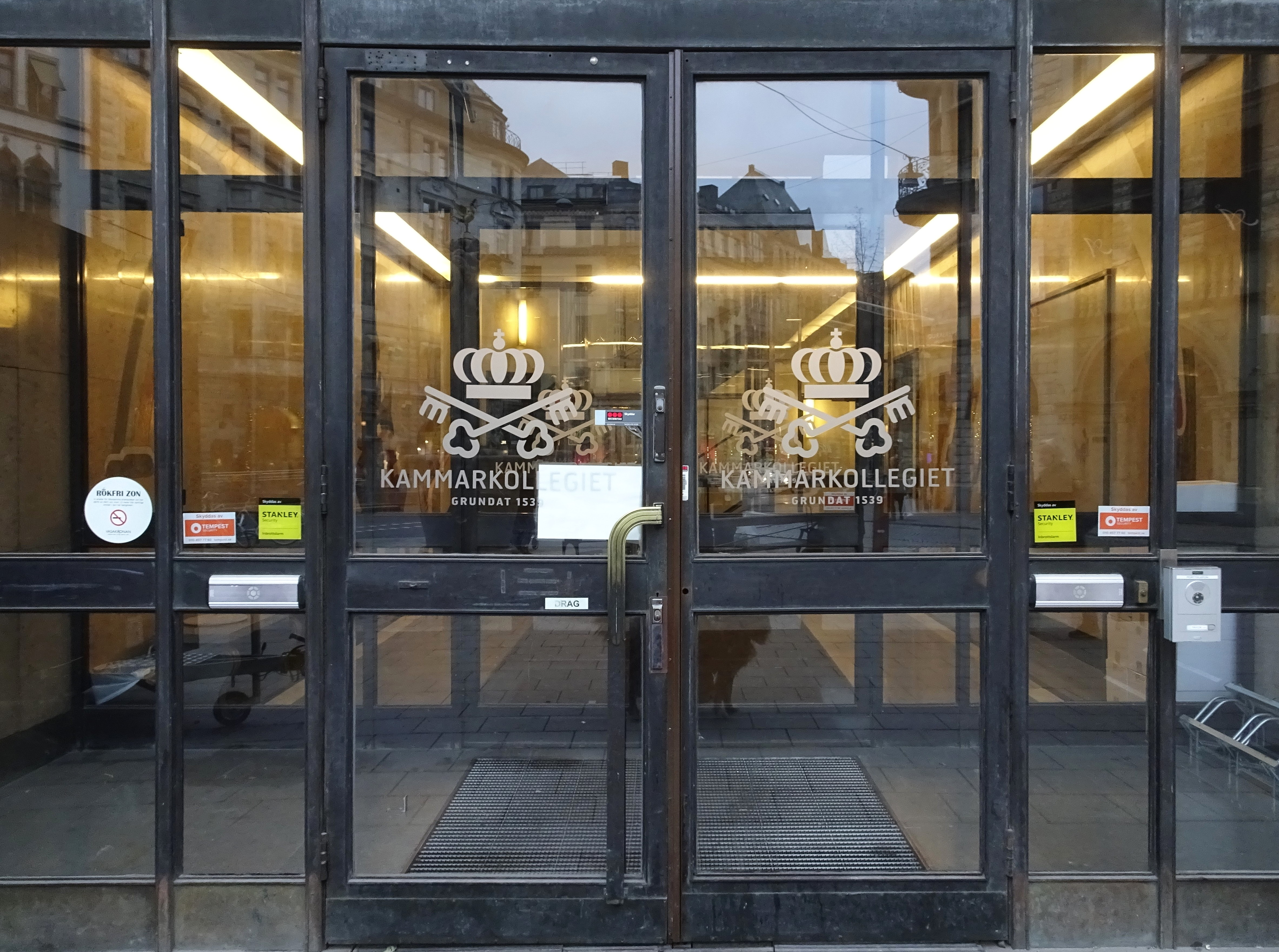

Agency overview
- Formed: 1539
- Headquarters: Stockholm
- Minister responsible: Elisabeth Svantesson, (Ministry of Finance)
- Agency executive: Anne Vadasz Nilsson, (Director-General)
- Parent agency: Ministry of Finance
- Key documents: Regleringsbrev; Instruktion
- Website: kammarkollegiet.se

The Legal, Financial and Administrative Services Agency (Note: Translated as the Legal, Financial and Administrative Services Agency or the Swedish Crown Lands Judiciary Board.) (Swedish: Kammarkollegiet, lit. '"Chamber College') is a Swedish government agency under the Ministry of Finance. Established in 1539 by King Gustav Vasa, it is the oldest still active government agency in Sweden.

== Role ==
It is tasked with providing various services within the public sector, in particular qualified legal and economic expertise, public administration, asset- and risk management. Kammarkollegiet represents the State in indemnity cases, speaks on behalf of the public in certain cases involving the Environmental Code, and in other matters as decided by the Chancellor of Justice. The agency is also responsible for the registration of religious communities, the appointment of those entitled to officiate weddings, setting rates for funeral charges, the authorisation of travel guarantees and use of interpreters and translators. Kammarkollegiet also monitors the State Inheritance Fund's interests and manages its capital. In addition to this, the agency also deals with changes to the regional division of Sweden, and exemptions from the testamentary provisions governing foundations.
