= Anna Sjödin =

Swedish politician (born 1976)

- Born: 1976 (age 48–49); Össeby-Garn, Vallentuna Municipality

Anna Sjödin (born 1976) is a Swedish Social Democratic politician, and elected president of the Social Democratic Youth League from 3 August 2005 to 16 December 2006. She was also elected vice president of the International Union of Socialist Youth (IUSY) at the congress in January 2006. Sjödin is the second woman, after Anna Lindh, to be elected president of the Social Democratic Youth League.

== Family life ==
Anna Sjödin was born in Össeby-Garn in Stockholm County and was raised outside of Enköping. She played rugby union in her youth and represented Sweden four times in 1994. After completing her secondary education Sjödin spent one year working at a health care facility in England and after that some time at a Kibbutz in Israel. After returning to Sweden she joined the Social Democratic Youth League at the age of 19, and moved to Umeå in order to study social work and public administration (Swedish: Socionom) at Umeå University. After having completed her studies Sjödin worked at a women's shelter.

== Political career ==
Anna Sjödin was first elected chairperson for the Social Democratic Youth League in Västerbotten, and in 2001 was elected in to the board of the Social Democratic Youth League. In August 2005 Sjödin was unanimously elected as the new chairperson of the Social Democratic Youth League after Ardalan Shekarabi who chose not to stand for re-election after several scandals and divisive battles. In December 2006 she had to resign from the chairperson position after found guilty of a number of severe criminal actions while drunk. See below. Later she has taken a position as a headmaster of a folk high school in Vindeln, North Sweden.

== 2006 arrest and criminal charges ==
On 29 January 2006, Sjödin was arrested by the police outside the pub Crazy Horse in Östermalm in Stockholm. A bouncer alleged that Sjödin was intoxicated and not only assaulted him and other bouncers but also used derogatory, anti-immigrant language. Sjödin, however, claimed that the bouncers assaulted her and her friends. The prosecutor rejected Sjödin's allegations, but continued investigating the allegations made by the bouncers.

During the trial Sjödin claimed the bouncer had shouted profanities at her and her friend and that he was aggressive, but she also admitted to being intoxicated. The barman had determined that Sjödin was too drunk to be served, and called the bouncers to eject Sjödin and her friend. During the trial, witnesses testified that Sjödin had resisted her ejection from the pub.

On 12 October 2006, the Stockholm district court found Sjödin guilty of assaulting the bouncer on charges of slander (Swedish: förolämpning), criminal conversion (Swedish: egenmäktigt förfarande), assaulting a person holding legal authority (Swedish: våld mot tjänsteman) and resisting lawful apprehension (Swedish: våldsamt motstånd). She was sentenced to pay a fine of 120 days wages (Swedish: dagsböter) at 300 kronor per day (36,000 kronor in total). Sjödin was also ordered to pay 5,500 kronor in damages to the bouncer. The court found that Sjödin had used words of "racist characteristic." The court also found that Sjödin had ripped Jamei's badge from his jacket and taken it with her into a police car. Sjödin has decided to appeal the verdict to the Svea Court of Appeal. The Court of Appeal decided not to try this case (the Court of Appeal can deny cases when the penalty is a fine). She has said she will appeal this denial, since in this case it is not only a fine, but a political career at stake.

Preceded by Ardalan Shekarabi	Chairperson of the Social Democratic Youth League; 2005 - 2006	Succeeded by Jytte Guteland
