= Minister of Immigration =

The Minister of Immigration may mean:

- Minister for Immigration and Border Protection (Australia)
- Minister of Immigration, Refugees and Citizenship (Canada)
- Minister of Immigration (New Zealand)
- Minister for Migration and Asylum Policy (Sweden)
- Minister for Security and Immigration (was Minister of State for Immigration) (United Kingdom)
