= Jytte Guteland =

Swedish politician (born 1979)

Jytte Guteland MEP
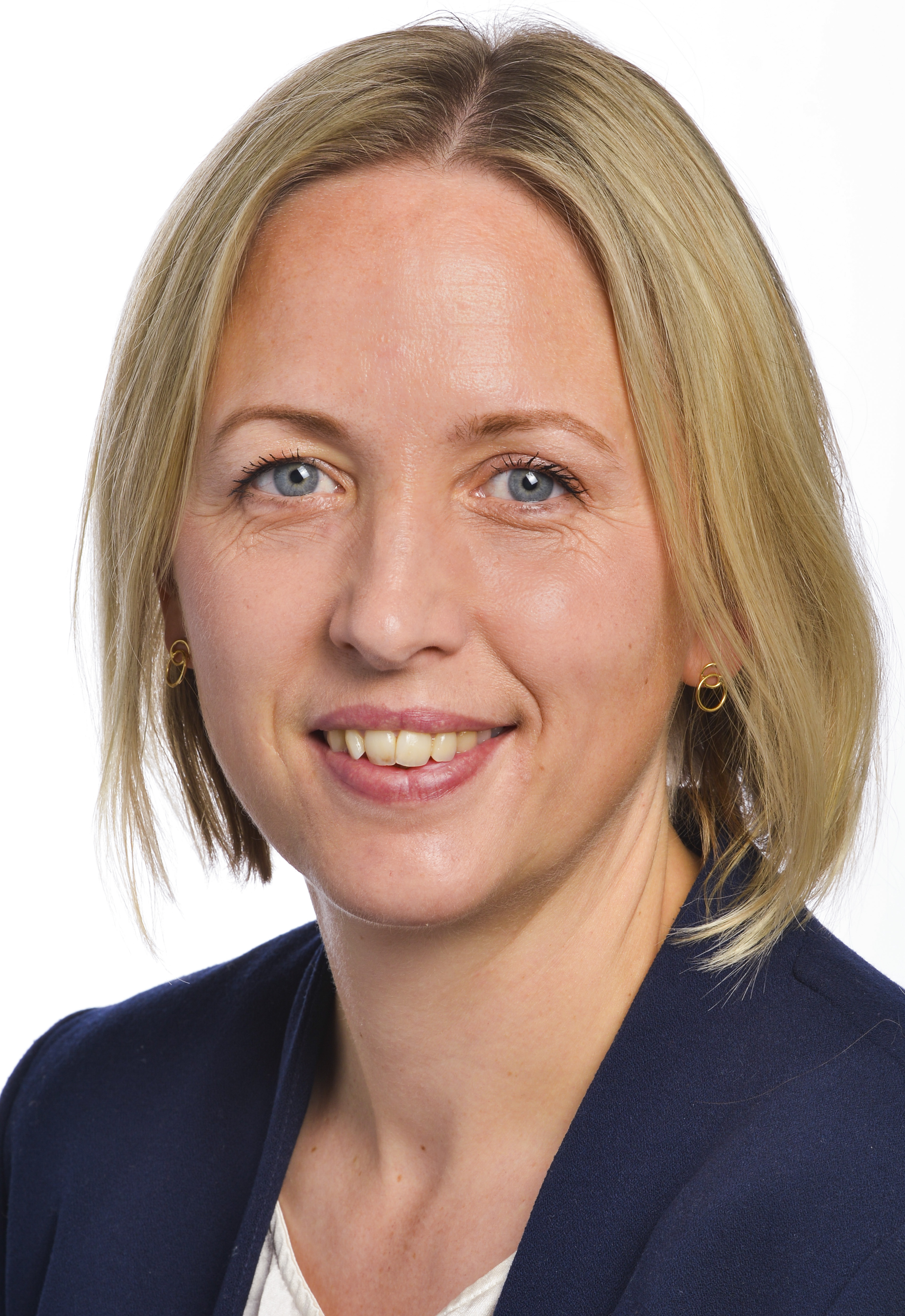

Member of the European Parliament
- In office 1 July 2014 – 25 September 2022
- Constituency: Sweden

Personal details
- Born: Jytte Gunlög Elisabeth Bengtsson Guteland; 16 September 1979 (age 47) Huddinge, Sweden
- Party: Swedish; Social Democrats; EU; Party of European Socialists
- Children: 2
- Education: University of Madrid
- Website: www.eu40.eu

Jytte Gunlög Elisabeth Bengtsson Guteland (born 16 September 1979) is a Swedish politician who served as a Member of the European Parliament from 2014 to 2022. She is a member of the Social Democrats, part of the Progressive Alliance of Socialists and Democrats.

== Early life and education ==
Guteland has a master's degree in Economics from Södertörn University.

== Career ==
Guteland was a member of the national executive board of the Social Democratic Youth League from 2005 to 2007 with responsibility for the welfare issues. She was chairperson of the Social Democratic Youth League from 2007 to 2011. In 2011, she was mentioned as a possible candidate for the party leadership of the Social Democrats.

Guteland has also been a political advisor at the Ministry of Finance and at the Ministry of Education. In addition, she has worked as project manager for the Swedish think tank organization Global Challenge.

=== Member of the European Parliament, 2014–2022 ===
Guteland was elected to the European Parliament in the 2014 European Parliament election in Sweden. Throughout her time in parliament, she served on the Committee on the Environment, Public Health and Food Safety. In this capacity, she was the Parliament’s rapporteur on measures to achieve carbon neutrality by 2050 (2020). In 2020, she also joined the Committee of Inquiry on the Protection of Animals during Transport.

In addition to her committee assignments, Guteland was a member of the Parliament’s delegation for relations with Iran. She also chaired the European Parliament Intergroup on the Western Sahara and served as a member of the European Parliament Intergroup on Climate Change, Biodiversity and Sustainable Development, the European Parliament Intergroup on the Welfare and Conservation of Animals and the European Parliament Intergroup on LGBT Rights.

In 2021, Guteland was part of the European Parliament’s official delegation to the United Nations Climate Change Conference (COP26).

In September 2022, she was the recipient of the Energy, Science and Research Award at The Parliament Magazine's annual MEP Awards

== Other activities ==
- European Council on Foreign Relations (ECFR), Member of the Council

Party political offices
Preceded by Anna Sjödin	Chairperson of the Swedish Social Democratic Youth League; 2007–2011	Succeeded by Gabriel Wikström
