= Ardalan Shekarabi =

Iranian-Swedish politician (born 1978)

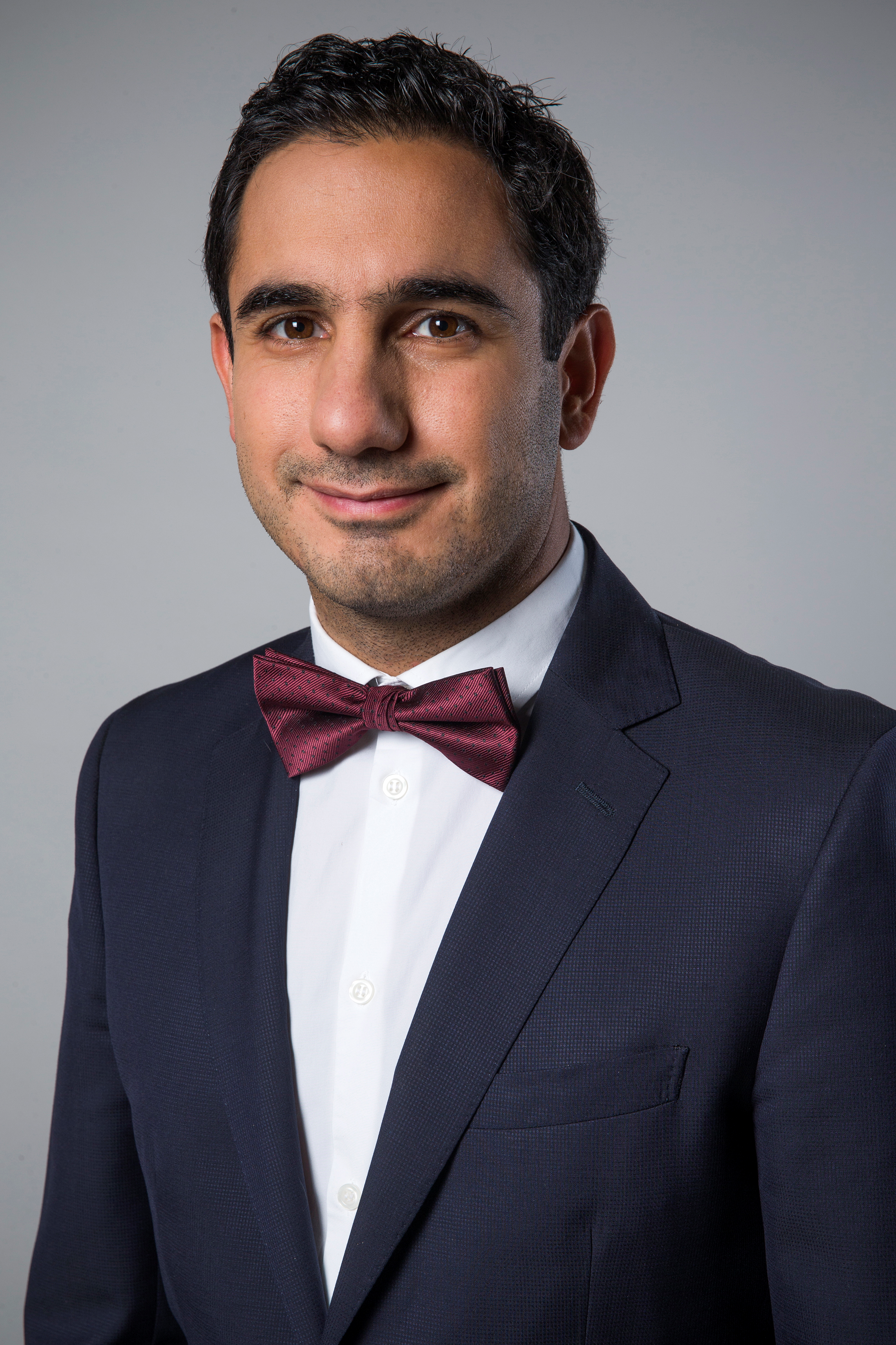

Minister for Social Security
- In office 1 October 2019 – 17 October 2022
- Monarch: Carl XVI Gustaf
- Prime Minister: Stefan Löfven; Magdalena Andersson
- Preceded by: Annika Strandhäll
- Succeeded by: Anna Tenje

Minister for Public Administration
- In office 3 October 2014 – 1 October 2019
- Monarch: Carl XVI Gustaf
- Prime Minister: Stefan Löfven
- Preceded by: Stefan Attefall
- Succeeded by: Lena Micko

Member of the Swedish Riksdag for Uppsala County
- In office 15 April 2013 – 3 October 2014

Personal details
- Born: 28 November 1978 (age 47) Manchester, United Kingdom
- Party: Social Democrats
- Spouse: Therese Skoglund Shekarabi
- Occupation: Jurist

Ardalan Shekarabi (Persian: اردلان شکرآبی; born 28 November 1978) is a Swedish social democratic politician. He was chairman for his party's youth league SSU 2003–2005. He was minister for social security from 2019 to 2022, and had previously served as minister for public administration from 2014 to 2019. From January to October 2019 he was also minister for consumer affairs.

== Early life and education ==
Ardalan Shekarabi is the son of Hassan Shekarabi and Sahra Sajadi. He was born in Manchester in the UK and grew up in Shahriyar outside Tehran in Iran. Shekarabi came to Sweden in 1989 together with his mother as a political refugee from Iran. Together they got an apartment in Gävle and Shekarabi started in a preparatory class at primary school. After receiving a rejection decision on their asylum application to stay in Sweden, the family opposed the decision by hiding from the Swedish authorities. In 1991, they were granted a residence permit for humanitarian reasons.

In 2007, Ardalan graduated from Uppsala University with Master of Laws degree.

== Controversies ==
In December 2004 Dagens Nyheter revealed that Shekarabi had siphoned funds from his political party's youth fund SSU into an account supposed to be used for integration projects. This account was later used for private purchases. Shekarabi claims he did not know where the money came from.

During Shekarabi's leadership of the SSU it was also revealed that extensive membership cheating had occurred, inflating numbers to gain more funds for SSU.

Party political offices
Preceded by Mikael Damberg	Chairperson of the Social Democratic Youth League; 2003–2005	Succeeded by Anna Sjödin
Political offices
Preceded by Annika Strandhäll	Minister for Social Security; 2019–2022	Succeeded by Anna Tenje
