= Vision (trade union) =

Trade union in Sweden

- Vision
- Founded: 1936 (as SKTF)
- Headquarters: Kungsgatan 28A, Stockholm, Sweden
- Location: Sweden
- Members: 207,000
- Key people: Veronica Magnusson, president
- Affiliations: TCO, PSI
- Website: www.vision.se

Vision (formerly SKTF and Sveriges Kommunaltjänstemannaförbund) is a trade union in Sweden, generally representing white-collar workers in municipalities, county councils and churches.

Vision has almost 200,000 members in a variety of professional groups, such as managers, social security officers, engineers, administrators, medical secretaries and dental practitioners.

Vision is a Fair Union and was the first trade union to use the concept (2007).

The organisation was founded in 1936 and is affiliated with the Swedish Confederation of Professional Employees, and Public Services International.
