= Gabriel Wikström =

Swedish politician (born 1985)

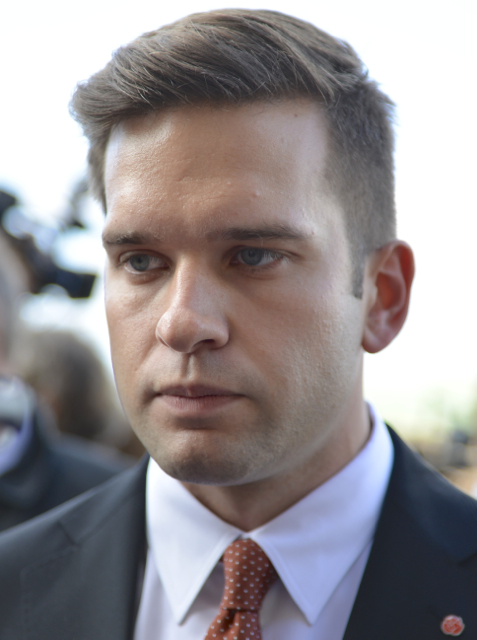
- Wikström in 2014

Minister for Public Health, Healthcare and Sports
- In office 3 October 2014 – 27 July 2017
- Monarch: Carl XVI Gustaf
- Prime Minister: Stefan Löfven
- Preceded by: Göran Hägglund
- Succeeded by: Annika Strandhäll (as Minister for Social Affairs)

Personal details
- Born: Per Johan Gabriel Wikström; 21 February 1985 (age 41)
- Party: Social Democrats

Per Johan Gabriel Wikström (born 21 February 1985) is a Swedish politician of the Social Democrats. He served as Minister for Public Health, Healthcare and Sports in the Swedish Government from 2014 to 2017. On 5 May 2017, Wikström announced he would be on sick leave due to symptoms related to burnout. Annika Strandhäll served acting Minister for Public Health, Healthcare and Sports during his sick leave, and on 27 July 2017 he resigned from his position.

== Career ==
Wikström started his career in the Swedish Social Democratic Youth League in Västmanland County in 2006. He was a member of the national executive board of the youth league from 2007 to 2011 and national chairman from 2011 until being appointed cabinet minister in 2014.

As national chairman, Wikström confronted the Social Democrats leadership by pushing a proposal of a 90-day warranty for young unemployed people through the Social Democrats Congress in 2013. The proposal was rejected by the party leadership, but gained hearing by the Congress delegates and is now one of the Löfven cabinet's key reforms since taking office in 2014, although it has not been implemented or announced yet (as of August 2016).

In March 2017, Wikström participated in the first ever gathering of the Party of European Socialists’ health ministers, chaired by Jevgeni Ossinovski.

Party political offices
Preceded by Jytte Guteland	Chairperson of the Social Democratic Youth League; 2011–2014	Succeeded by Ellinor Eriksson
Political offices
Preceded by Göran Hägglund (as Minister for Public Health and Healthcare); Lena Adelsohn Liljeroth (as Minister for Sports)	Minister for Public Health, Healthcare and Sports; 2014–2017	Succeeded by Annika Strandhäll (as Minister for Social Affairs)
