= Minister for Social Security (Sweden) =

Swedish cabinet position

- Socialförsäkringsminister
- Lesser coat of arms of Sweden

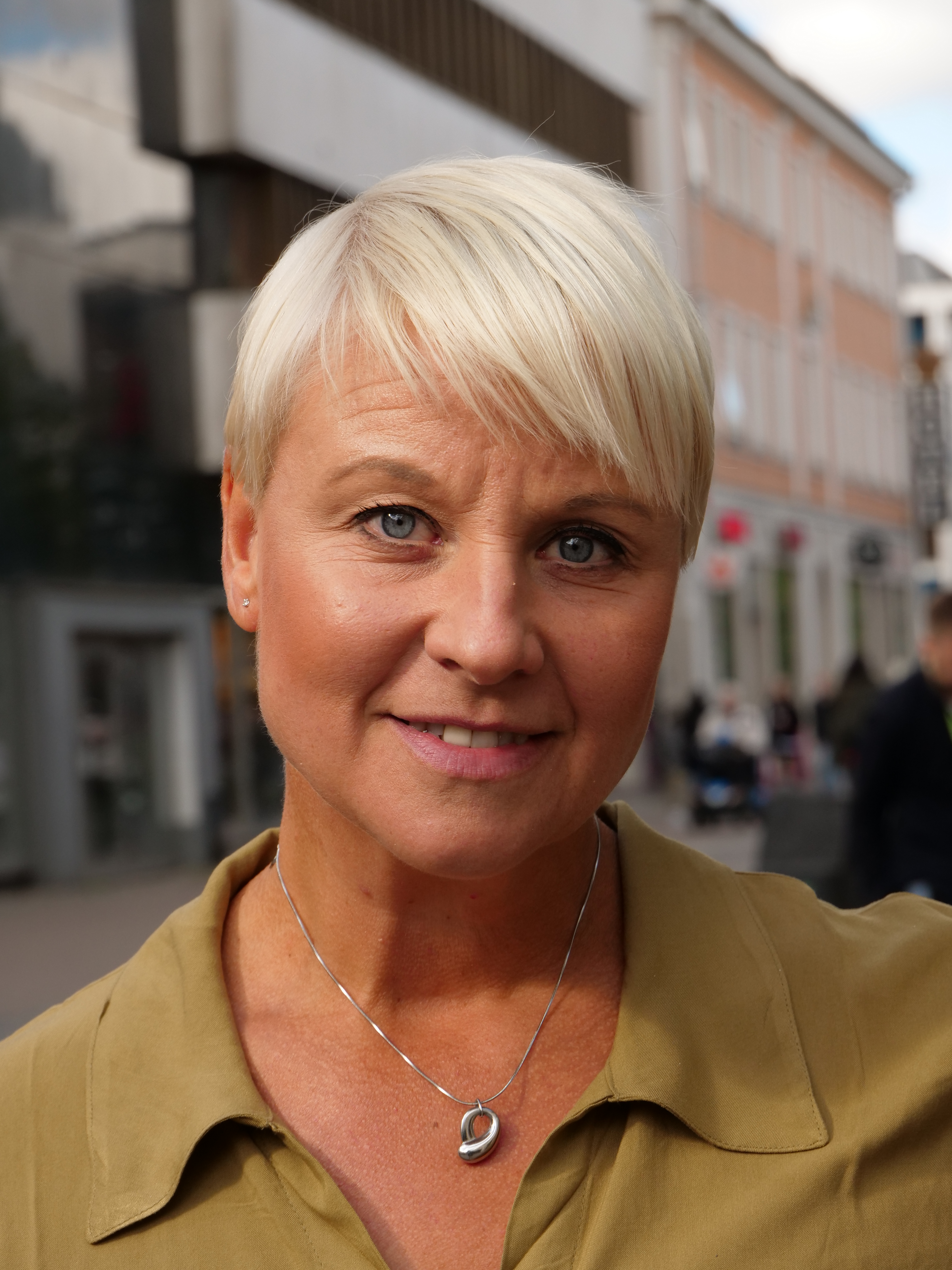
- Incumbent; Anna Tenje since 18 October 2022
- Ministry of Health and Social Affairs
- Member of: The Government
- Seat: Stockholm, Sweden
- Appointer: The Prime Minister
- Term length: No fixed term serves at the pleasure of the Prime Minister
- Formation: 4 October 1991
- First holder: Bo Könberg
- Website: www.government.se

The Minister for Social Security (Swedish: Socialförsäkringsminister) is a cabinet minister within the Swedish Government. The cabinet minister is appointed by the Prime Minister of Sweden.

== List of ministers for social security ==
No.	Portrait	Minister for Social Security	Took office	Left office	Time in office	Party	Prime Minister
1	Bo Könberg	Bo Könberg (born 1945)	4 October 1991	7 October 1994	3 years, 3 days	Liberals	Carl Bildt (M)
2	Anna Hedborg	Anna Hedborg (born 1944)	7 October 1994	22 March 1996	1 year, 161 days	Social Democrats	Ingvar Carlsson (S)
3	Maj-Inger Klingvall	Maj-Inger Klingvall (born 1946)	22 March 1996	14 September 1999	3 years, 176 days	Social Democrats	Göran Persson (S)
4	Ingela Thalén	Ingela Thalén (born 1943)	14 September 1999	10 October 2002	3 years, 26 days	Social Democrats	Göran Persson (S)
5	Berit Andnor	Berit Andnor (born 1954)	10 October 2002; From 1 October 2004 as head of the ministry with the title Minister for Social Affairs	6 October 2006	3 years, 361 days	Social Democrats	Göran Persson (S)
6	Cristina Husmark Pehrsson	Cristina Husmark Pehrsson (born 1947)	6 October 2006	5 October 2010	3 years, 364 days	Moderate	Fredrik Reinfeldt (M)
7	Ulf Kristersson	Ulf Kristersson (born 1963)	5 October 2010	3 October 2014	3 years, 363 days	Moderate	Fredrik Reinfeldt (M)
8	Annika Strandhäll	Annika Strandhäll (born 1975)	3 October 2014	1 October 2019	4 years, 363 days	Social Democrats	Stefan Löfven (S)
9	Ardalan Shekarabi	Ardalan Shekarabi (born 1978)	1 October 2019	18 October 2022	3 years, 17 days	Social Democrats	Stefan Löfven (S); Magdalena Andersson (Social Democratic)
10	Anna Tenje	Anna Tenje (born 1977)	18 October 2022	Incumbent	3 years, 324 days	Moderate	Ulf Kristersson (M)
