= Ingela Thalén =

Swedish politician (born 1943)

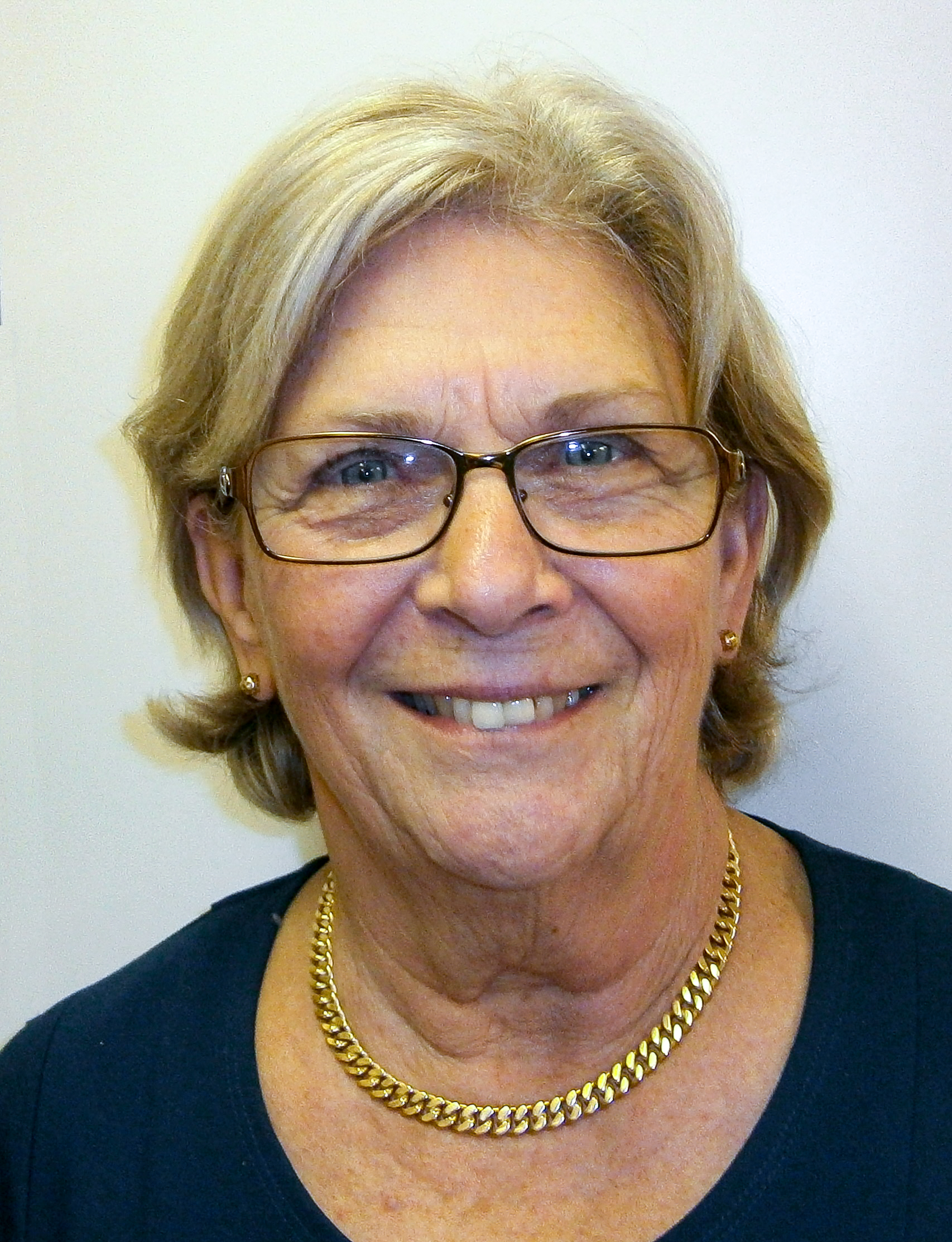
- Thalén in Göteborg in November 2013

Member of the Swedish Parliament
- In office 1988–2004

Personal details
- Born: 1 October 1943 (age 81)
- Political party: Swedish Social Democratic Party

Ingela Anita Thalén (born 1 October 1943) is a Swedish politician for the Swedish Social Democratic Party and a former minister. She was a member of the Swedish government 1987–1991 and 1994–2002.

Thalén is the daughter of laundry worker Erland Ericsson and tailor Sara Ström. She was a member of the city council and chairman (mayor) of the municipality board of Järfälla municipality between 1983 and 1987. After that, she was appointed by Prime Minister Ingvar Carlsson as new Minister for Employment, a ministerial post she had between 1987 and 1990. She was appointed as Minister of Health between 1990 and 1991 and also between 1994 and 1996. Thalén continued as a member of parliament in Sweden between 1988 and 2004. She was a chairman of the parliament's labour committee between 1992 and 1994, a member of the social committee between 1991 and 1992 and of the housing committee between 1992 and 1994.

Thalén was party secretary for the Social Democratic party between 1996 and 1999 and after that Minister for Social Security between 1999 and 2002. Since 2013, she is a municipality auditor in Värmdö municipality.

Thalén left her political work with her last post as the chairman of the Swedish Barnens rätt i samhället (BRIS) from 2005 until 2009.

She is also a member of the Svenska Folkdansringen. In October 2013, she received a silver-mark for her work at the dance organisation.
