= Swedish Social Insurance Agency =

- Försäkringskassan

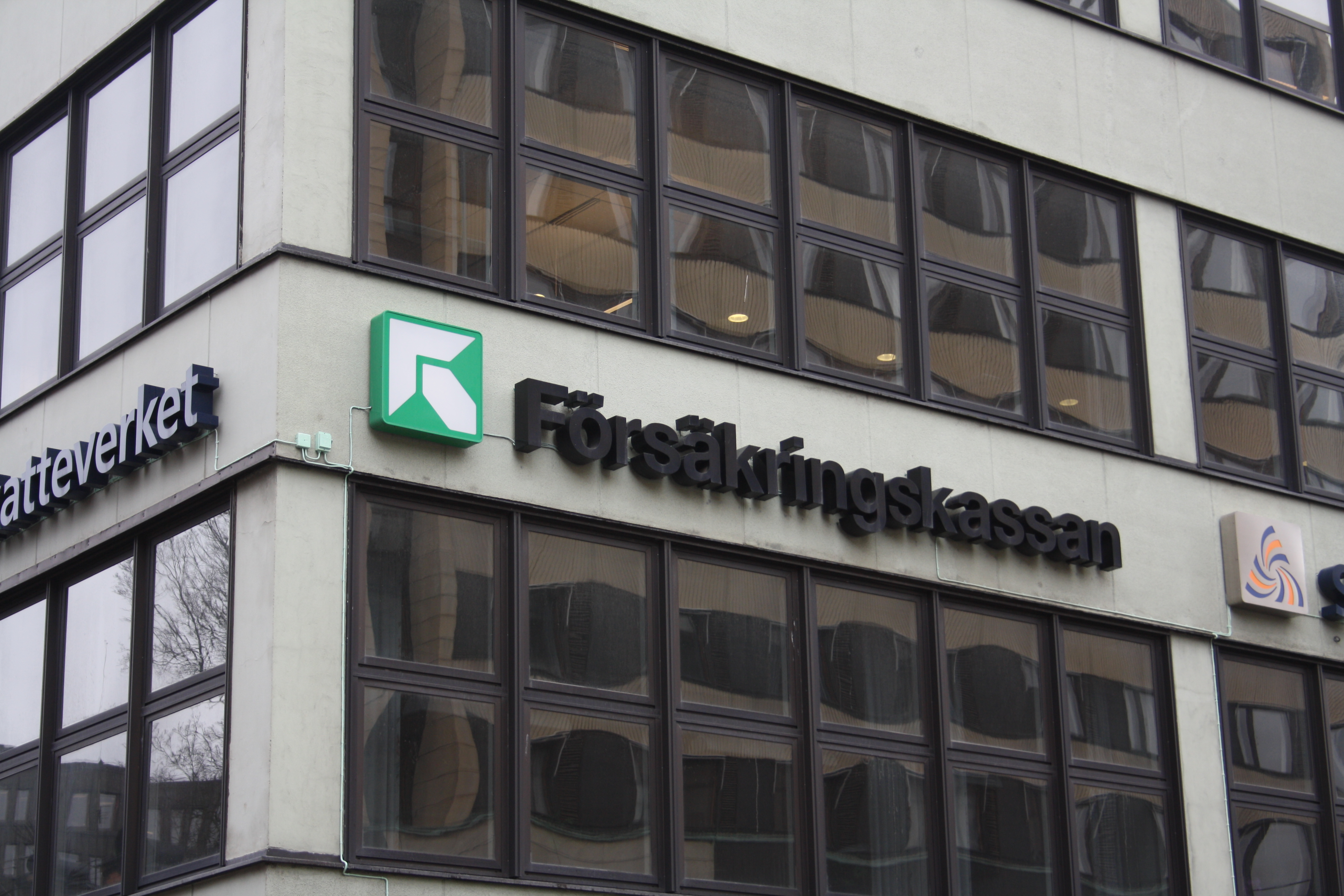
- Headquarters in Hägersten, Stockholm

Agency overview
- Formed: 1 January 2005
- Jurisdiction: Government of Sweden
- Headquarters: LM Ericssons väg, 126 26 Hägersten, Stockholm; 59.298688°N 17.993562°E
- Employees: ~14,000 (2019)
- Annual budget: SEK 200.1 billion (2014)
- Agency executive: Nils Öberg, Director general
- Parent agency: Ministry of Health and Social Affairs
- Website: www.forsakringskassan.se

The Swedish Social Insurance Agency (Försäkringskassan, Swedish pronunciation: [fœˈsɛːkrɪŋsˌkasːan]) is a government agency in Sweden responsible for administering the national social insurance system.

== Responsibilities ==
The agency administers a wide range of benefits and allowances.

- Immigrant support and allowances (etableringsersättning)
- Pensions and disability benefits (pension och förtidspension)
- Parental leave benefit (föräldrapenning)
- Pregnancy benefit (graviditetspenning)
- Child allowance (barnbidrag)
- Housing benefit (bostadsbidrag)
- Sickness benefit (sjukpenning)
- Rehabilitation allowance (rehabiliteringsersättning)
- Enforcement of child support orders, domestic and international (underhållsbidrag)

== See also ==
- Welfare in Sweden
