= Ministry of Health and Social Affairs (Sweden) =

Government ministry of Sweden

Coordinates: 59°19′43.97″N 18°03′55.54″E

- Socialdepartementet
- Lesser Coat of Arms

Agency overview
- Formed: 1 July 1920
- Jurisdiction: SFS 1996:1515
- Headquarters: Fredsgatan 8, Stockholm
- Employees: 333 (2024)
- Annual budget: SEK 426 million (2025)
- Ministers responsible: Jakob Forssmed, Head of the Ministry Minister for Social Affairs and Public Health; Elisabet Lann, Minister for Healthcare; Anna Tenje, Minister for Older People and Social Security; Camilla Waltersson Grönvall, Minister for Social Services
- Parent agency: Government Offices (Note: Before 1 January 1975, the Government Offices was called the Royal Chancery.)
- Website: www.government.se/government-of-sweden/ministry-of-health-and-social-affairs/

The Ministry of Health and Social Affairs (Swedish: Socialdepartementet) is a ministry in the Government of Sweden responsible for policies related to social welfare: social security, social services, medical and health care, public health and the rights of children, the elderly and disabled people.

The ministry is currently headed by the Minister for Social Affairs and Public Health, Jakob Forssmed of the Christian Democrats.

== History ==
The ministry was established on 1 July 1920 when the Ministry of Civil Service Affairs was split into two ministries, the Ministry of Social Affairs and the Ministry of Communications.

It is located at Fredsgatan 8 in Stockholm.

== Government agencies and other bodies ==
The largest agency under the Ministry of Health and Social Affairs (sorted by operating costs) is the Swedish Social Insurance Agency, with annual costs over 15% of GDP and 16,000 employees. This agency is in charge of financial aspects of family policy and social security in the event of illness and disability.

The Ministry of Health and Social Affairs is principal for 20 government agencies, two state-owned companies (Systembolaget AB, operating an alcohol monopoly, and Apoteket Produktion % Laboratorier AB, operating non-monopolistic entity) and three funds.

=== Agencies ===
- Alcoholic Beverages Product Range Board (Alkoholsortimentsnämnden)
- eHealth Agency (eHälsomyndigheten)
- Public Health Agency (Folkhälsomyndigheten)
- Swedish Research Council for Health, Working Life (Forskningsrådet för arbetsliv, hälsa och välfärd)
- Social Insurance Agency (Försäkringskassan)
- Medical Responsibility Board (Hälso- och sjukvårdens ansvarsnämnd)
- Social Insurane Inspectorate (Inspektionen för socialförsäkringen)
- Health and Social Care Inspectorate (Inspektionen för vård och omsorg)
- Dental and Pharmaceutical Benefits Agency (Tandvårds- och läkemedelsförmånsverket)
- Medical Products Agency (Läkemedelsverket)
- Agency for Participation (Myndigheten för delaktighet)
- Family Law and Parental Support Authority (Myndigheten för familjerätt och föräldraskapsstöd)
- Agency for Health and Care Services Analysis (Myndigheten för vård- och omsorgsanays)
- Pensions Agency (Pensionsmyndigheten)
- Board of Health and Welfare (Socialstyrelsen)
- Agency for Health Technology Assessment and Assessment of Social Services (Statens beredning för medicinsk och social utvärdering)
- Board of Institutional Care (Statens institutionsstyrelse)
- Ombudsman for Children in Sweden (Barnombudsmannen)
- Agency for Support to Faith Communities (Myndigheten för stöd till trossamfund)
- Agency for Youth and Civil Society (Myndigheten för ungdoms- och civilsamhällesfrågor)

=== Government funds ===
- Inheritance Fund (Allmänna arvsfonden)
- General Practitioners Foundation (Provinsialläkarstiftelsen)
- WHO Collaborating Centre for International Drug Monitoring Fund

=== State-owned companies ===
- Apotek Produktion & Laboratorier (APL)
- Systembolaget AB, state-owned chain of liquor stores, the only retailer allowed to sell alcoholic beverages in Sweden (see alcohol monopoly)

== Policy areas ==
- Burial and cremation services
- Care for older people
- Children's rights
- Civil society and sports
- Disabilities
- Faith communities
- Family care
- Medical care
- Pensions system
- Public health
- Social insurance
- Social services
- Youth policy

== Cabinet ministers ==
=== Ministers with the title of Health Care ===
No.	Portrait	Name	Title	Took office	Left office	Time in office	Party	Prime Minister
1	Ingegerd Troedsson	Ingegerd Troedsson (1929–2012)	Minister for Health Care	8 October 1976	18 October 1978	2 years, 10 days	Moderate	Thorbjörn Fälldin (C)
2	Hedda Lindahl	Hedda Lindahl (1919–2007)	Minister for Health Care	18 October 1978	12 October 1979	359 days	Liberals	Ola Ullsten (L)
3	Elisabet Holm	Elisabet Holm (1917–1997)	Minister for Health Care	12 October 1979	5 May 1981	1 year, 205 days	Moderate	Thorbjörn Fälldin (C)
4	Karin Ahrland	Karin Ahrland (1931–2019)	Minister for Health Care	22 May 1981	8 October 1982	1 year, 139 days	Liberals	Thorbjörn Fälldin (C)
Title not used: 1982–1991
5	Bo Könberg	Bo Könberg (born 1945)	Minister for Health Care and Social Security	4 October 1991	7 October 1994	3 years, 3 days	Liberals	Carl Bildt (M)
Title not used: 1994–2004
6	Ylva Johansson	Ylva Johansson (born 1964)	Minister for Health and Elderly Care	13 September 2004	6 October 2006	2 years, 23 days	Social Democrats	Göran Persson (S)
Title not used: 2006–2014
7	Gabriel Wikström	Gabriel Wikström (born 1985)	Minister for Public Health, Health Care and Sports	3 October 2014	27 July 2017	2 years, 297 days	Social Democrats	Stefan Löfven (S)
Title not used: 2017–2022
8	Acko Ankarberg Johansson	Acko Ankarberg Johansson (born 1964)	Minister for Health Care	18 October 2022	9 September 2025	2 years, 326 days	Christian Democrats	Ulf Kristersson (M)
9	Elisabet Lann	Elisabet Lann (born 1977)	Minister for Health Care	9 September 2025	Incumbent	333 days	Christian Democrats	Ulf Kristersson (M)

=== Ministers with the title of Social Services ===
No.	Portrait	Name	Title	Took office	Left office	Time in office	Party	Prime Minister
1	Camilla Waltersson Grönvall	Camilla Waltersson Grönvall (born 1969)	Minister for Social Services	18 October 2022	Incumbent	3 years, 294 days	Moderate	Ulf Kristersson (M)

== See also ==
- Health care in Sweden
