= Consulate General of Sweden, New York City =

Consular representation of the Kingdom of Sweden in the United States

- Location: New York City
- Address: One Dag Hammarskjöld Plaza; 885 Second Avenue, 40th floor New York, NY 10017
- Coordinates: 40.76089°N 73.97079°W
- Opened: 1799 (as consulate); 1914 (as consulate general)
- Jurisdiction: Consular district below
- Consul General: Erik Ullenhag
- Website: Official website

The Consulate General of Sweden is the diplomatic mission of Sweden in New York City. It is located at One Dag Hammarskjöld Plaza in Turtle Bay, Manhattan, near the headquarters of the United Nations. The consulate general originated from the consulate opened in 1834, which was converted into an consulate general in 1914. The consular district includes the states of Connecticut, Maine, Massachusetts, New Hampshire, New Jersey, New York, Pennsylvania, Rhode Island, and Vermont. The consulate general offers various consular services like passport applications, citizenship matters, and name registration, alongside providing assistance to Swedes in emergencies. It also works on fostering cultural and economic ties, organizing events to promote Swedish culture in the northeastern United States. Additionally, it facilitates information sharing about Sweden, and promotes exchanges between Swedish and American organizations.

== History ==
The consulate in New York City was established following a petition submitted by the Chancery (Kanslikollegium) and the National Board of Trade on October 14, 1799. Its original consular district comprised the states of New York and Connecticut. In 1834, it was merged with the Consulate General for the United States, a function that had since 1822 been entrusted to the Swedish Legation in the United States and was transferred that same year from Philadelphia to New York City. Before 1833, the consul general, who received an annual allowance of 4,000 Hamburg banco riksdaler, had not been entitled to collect consular fees from Swedish vessels. By decision of the King in Council of March 13, 1822, however, he was granted a fee of two Spanish piastres for every certificate issued.

Under the letters patent of May 25, 1850, the Consulate General's district was extended to the entire Union with the exception of California. By letters patent of June 15, 1858, however, the Swedish Legation was transferred to Washington, D.C.. At the same time, a separate consulate was established in New York City, with the State of New York as its district and an office appropriation of 500 Hamburg banco riksdaler. The appropriation was increased to 1,000 riksdaler on November 15, 1867 and to 1,500 on November 11, 1870. By letters patent of July 1, 1886, a salaried vice consul was appointed to serve alongside the consul. The position initially carried a salary of SEK 6,000, which was raised to SEK 9,000 on November 17, 1899 and to SEK 12,000 on August 28, 1908. The letters patent of December 5, 1890 also converted the consulate into a salaried post, with an annual salary of SEK 30,000, and greatly expanded its district. In addition to the State of New York, it included all seaports in the states bordering the Atlantic Ocean and the Gulf of Mexico.

Following the dissolution of the Swedish–Norwegian Union in 1905, the consul's salary was abolished, and the office was temporarily filled by an unsalaried consul serving by appointment. The incumbent nevertheless received an office allowance of SEK 8,000, which was reduced to SEK 4,000 after September 28, 1907. The salaried Vice Consulate, however, was retained. By letters patent of August 28, 1908, the Consulate was once again made a salaried post, with an annual salary of SEK 24,000 and an additional office allowance of SEK 6,000. Its district comprised the states of Maine, New Hampshire, Vermont, Massachusetts, Rhode Island, Connecticut, New York, New Jersey, Pennsylvania, Delaware, Maryland, Virginia, West Virginia, Kentucky, Tennessee, North Carolina, South Carolina, Georgia, Florida, Alabama, Mississippi, Louisiana, and Texas, as well as the District of Columbia. At the Riksdag of 1913, the King's proposal to reorganize the Consulate as a Consulate General and to increase the consul general's salary to SEK 28,000 was approved. On January 1, 1914, the consulate was upgraded to a consulate general.

On July 1, 1992, the Swedish Information Service, was integrated with the Swedish Consulate General in New York City.

In 2010, the general consulate - a mission with about 25 employees, diplomats as well as local employees - was closed for budgetary reasons. In connection with this, the smaller Swedish honorary consulate general opened. Prime Minister Stefan Löfven announced in November 2014 that Sweden would re-open a general consulate in New York City, then no earlier than fall of 2015. On October 29, 2015, the Swedish government decided to upgrade the Swedish presence in New York City by opening a consulate general. The new mission was staffed by two people from the Ministry for Foreign Affairs and a number of local employees. On January 27, 2016, Sweden's new consulate general in New York City was inaugurated in a ceremony with, among others, Minister of Enterprise and Innovation Mikael Damberg, Sweden's new consul general Leif Pagrotsky, ambassador Björn Lyrvall, Deputy Commissioner Hillary Schrenell and outgoing honorary consul general David E.R. Dangoor.

== Tasks ==
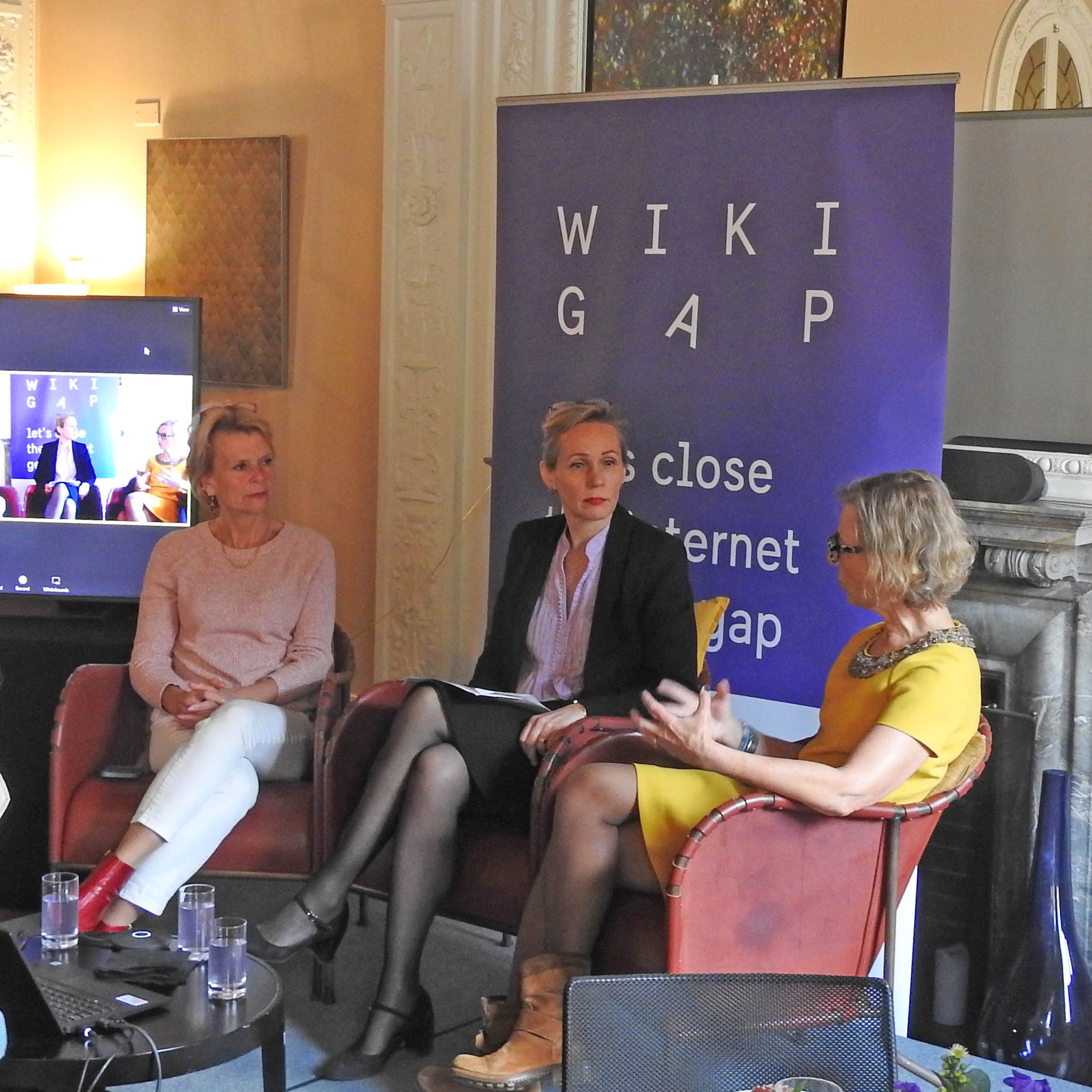
Wikigap edit-a-thon at the consulate general in 2022

The consulate general provides consular services, including passport applications, citizenship issues, name registration, and application for co-ordination numbers (samordningsnummer). It also includes offering advice and support to Swedes in emergency situations. The consulate general works on promoting cultural and economic relations. The consulate general organizes and supports activities to promote Swedish culture and interests in the northeastern the United States. The consulate general assists the public and media with information about Sweden, as well as promotes exchanges between organizations, companies, and institutions in Sweden and the United States.

== District ==
The consular district, at least from 1969 to 1975, included, in addition to the city of New York City, the states of New York, Connecticut, Delaware, Georgia, Kentucky, Maine, Maryland, Massachusetts, New Hampshire, New Jersey, North Carolina, Pennsylvania, Rhode Island, South Carolina, Tennessee, Vermont, Virginia, West Virginia, Florida (except the Florida panhandle), and the District of Columbia, as well as Puerto Rico and Saint Thomas. The states of Alabama, Louisiana, Mississippi, Texas, as well as the Florida panhandle belonged to the Consulate General of Sweden, Houston until 1975. From 1976 they belonged to the Consulate General in the New York City district. In the same year, the states of Kentucky and Tennessee were transferred to the Consulate General of Sweden, Chicago. In 1979, the states except Florida reverted to the Consulate General in Houston.

From 1982, they were responsible for the entire United States Virgin Islands. The Consulate General in Houston closed in 1982 and from 1983 the Consulate General in New York City was again responsible for the states of Alabama, Louisiana, Mississippi as well as the newly added Arkansas, but not Texas. In 1993, the Swedish Consulate General in Chicago closed, so the following year the Consulate General in New York City took over the states of Illinois, Indiana, Iowa, Kansas, Kentucky, Michigan, Minnesota, Missouri, Nebraska, North Dakota, Ohio, Oklahoma, South Dakota, Tennessee, Texas, and Wisconsin. In 1995, the Consulate General of Sweden, Los Angeles closed and the Consulate General in New York City became Sweden's only remaining consulate general in the USA. The district then came to include the entire United States.

As of October 31, 2023, the consulate general's district includes the states of Connecticut, Maine, Massachusetts, New Hampshire, New Jersey, New York, Pennsylvania, Rhode Island, and Vermont.

== Buildings ==
=== Chancery ===
On April 12, 1899, the Swedish-Norwegian consulate relocated to 17 State Street in the Financial District. In January 1906, it was reported that the Swedish consulate had moved to Room 1006 at 17 State Street. The consulate remained at the same address until 1919. In 1920, it was located at 119 Nassau Street in the Financial District. From 1921 to 1922, it was situated at 6 Beekman Street in the Financial District.

In 1923, it moved to Room 5838, Grand Central Terminal Building, 70 East 45th Street. The consulate general remained there until February 28, 1931. From March 1, 1931, to 1936, the consulate general was located in the Chrysler Building at 405 Lexington Avenue in Midtown. From 1937 to 1947, the consulate general was situated in Room 1118, International Building, Rockefeller Center at 630 Fifth Avenue.

In 1948, the consulate general moved to 61 East 64th Street in Lenox Hill on the Upper East Side. The consulate general remained there for over 20 years, until 1969. In 1970, the consulate general moved to the 39th floor at 825 Third Avenue in Midtown East. In 1976, it moved down to the 38th floor, where it remained until 1989. In 1990, it moved to the 45th floor of One Dag Hammarskjöld Plaza at 885 Second Avenue. It remained there until 2009 when the consulate general closed.

When the honorary consulate general opened in 2010, the chancery moved to 445 Park Avenue between 56th Street and 57th Street, for the reason that the honorary consul general David E.R. Dangoor already had offices in this building. After the upgrade to consulate general in December 2016, the consulate general's address became 445 Park Avenue until further notice. Since 2017, the chancery is again located at One Dag Hammarskjöld Plaza, but on the 40th floor.

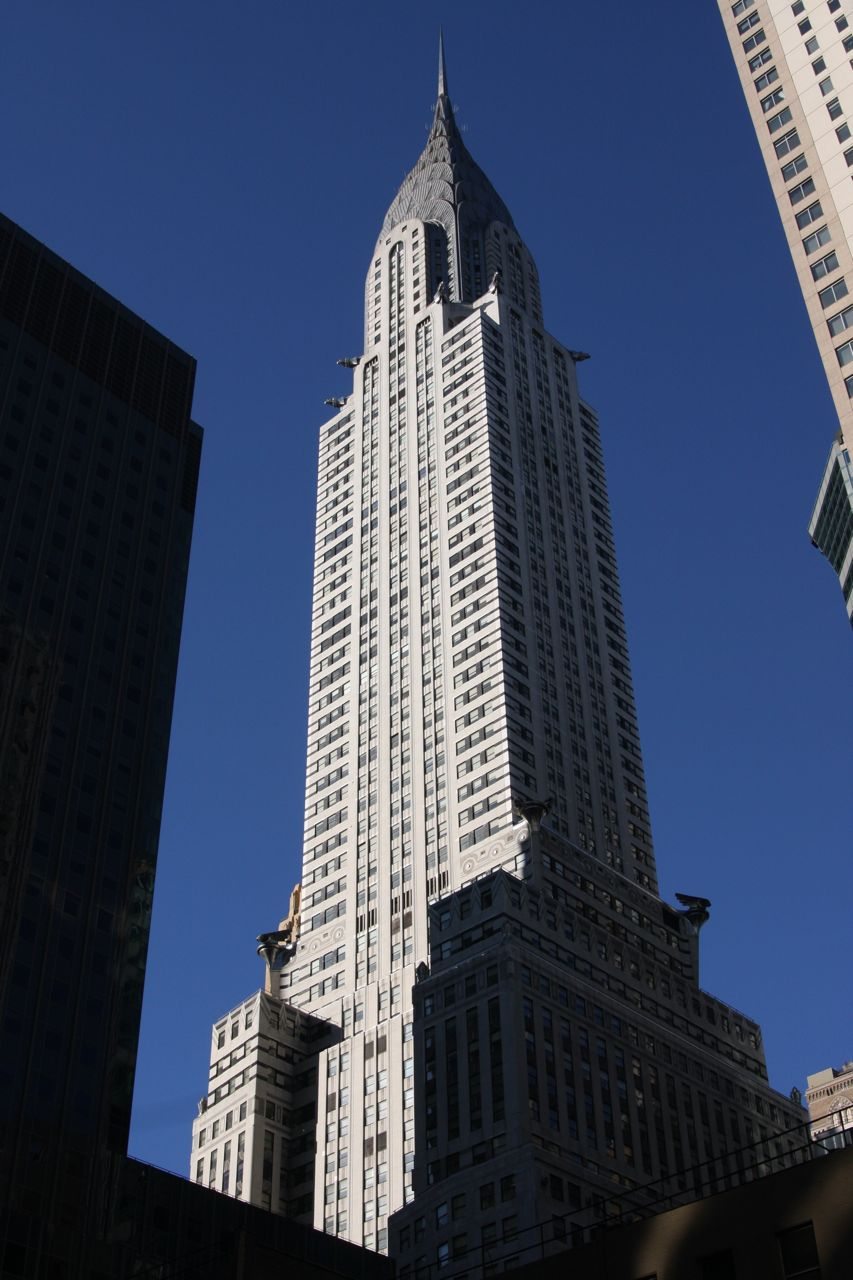
Chrysler Building
405 Lexington Avenue,
(1931–1936)

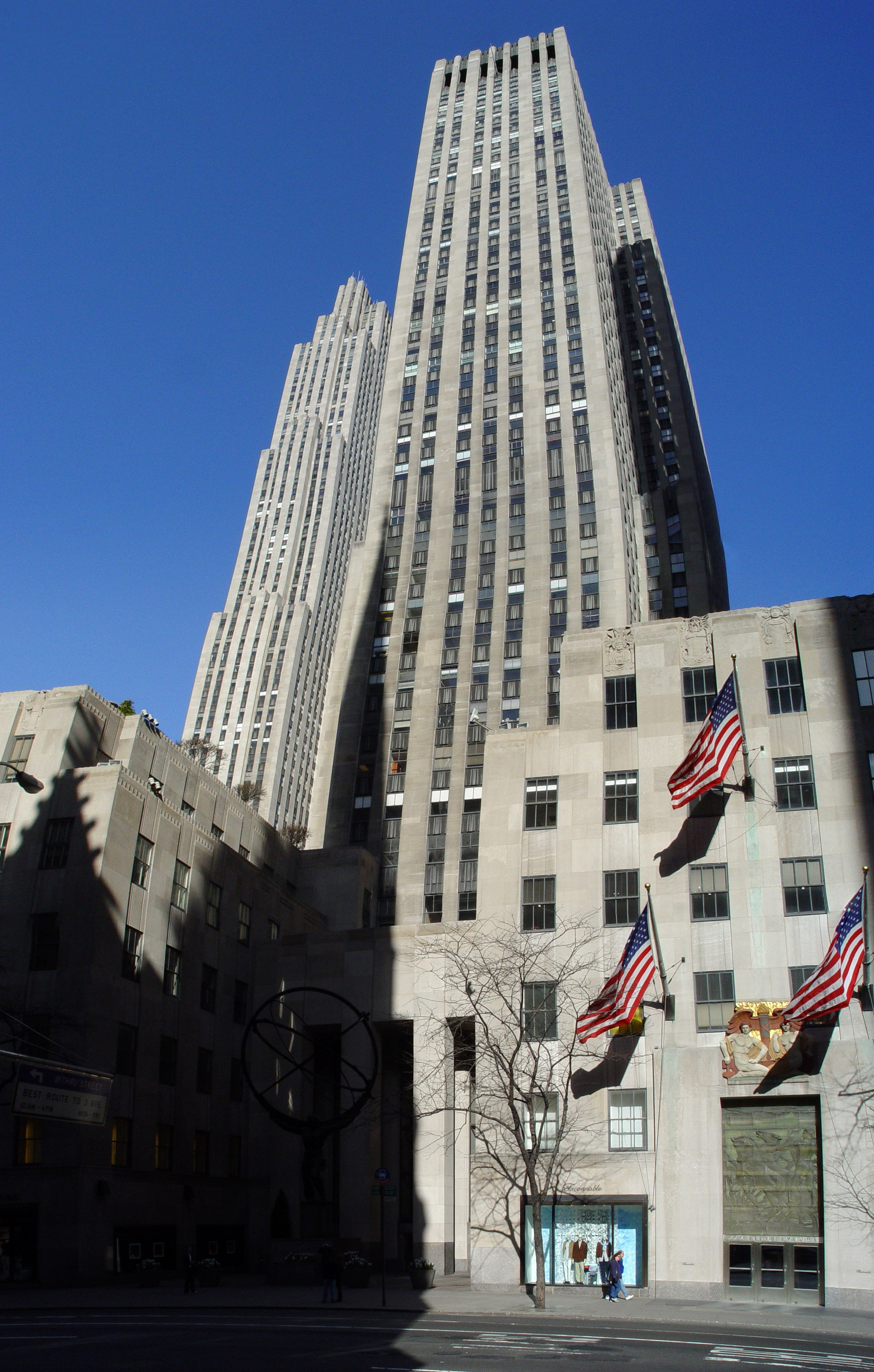
International Building
630 Fifth Avenue
(1937–1947)

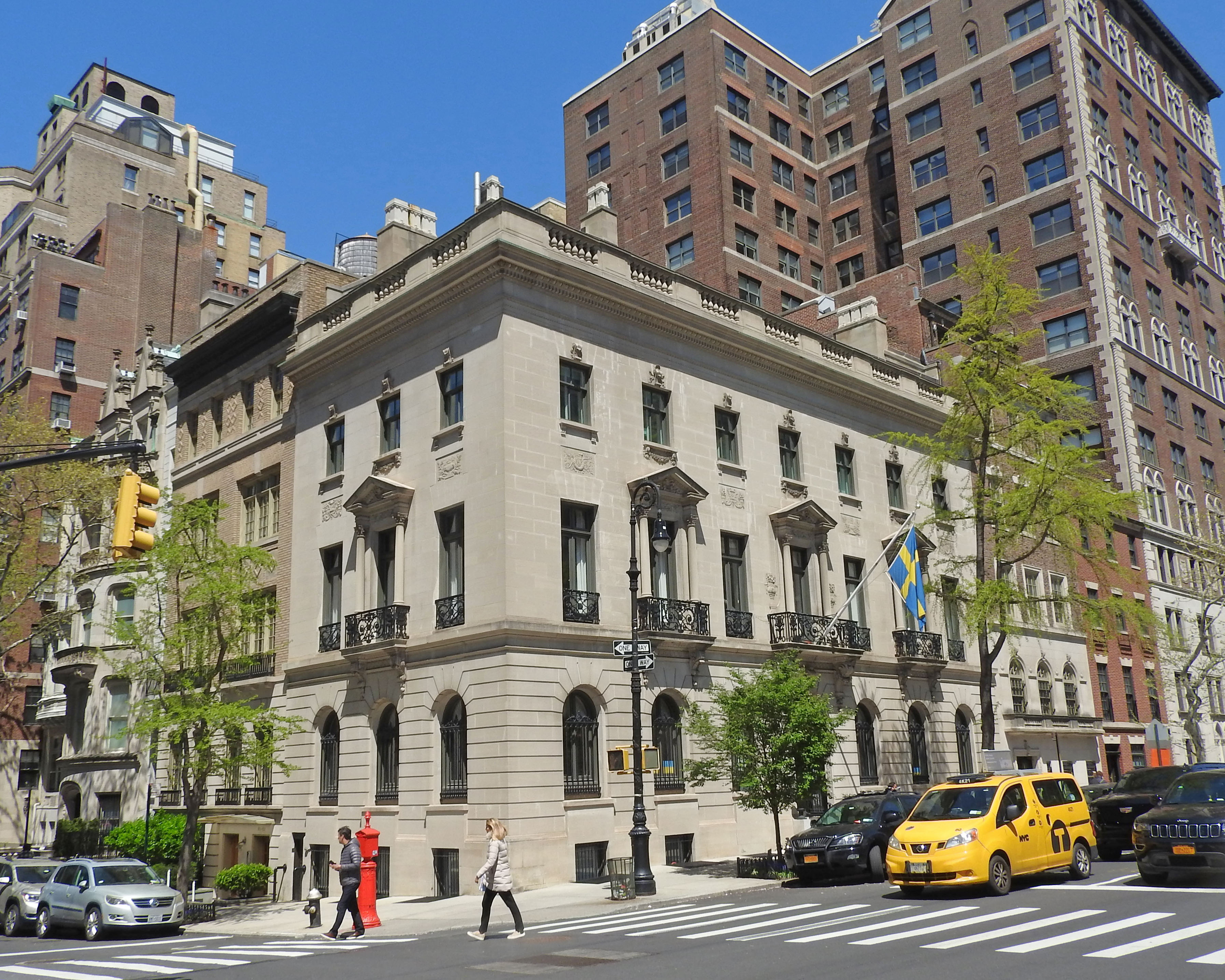
61 East 64th Street (left)
(1948–1969)

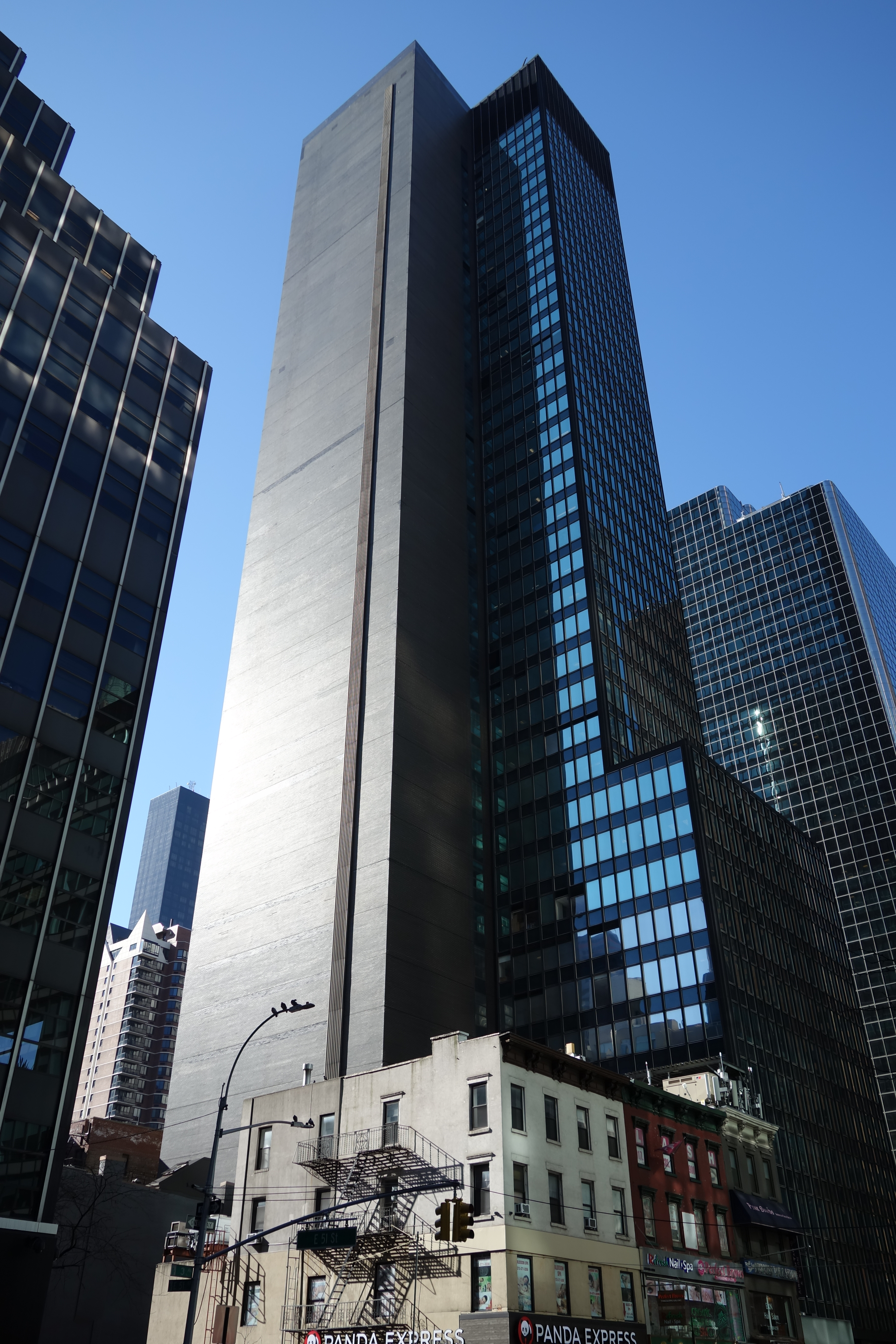
825 Third Avenue
(1970–1989)

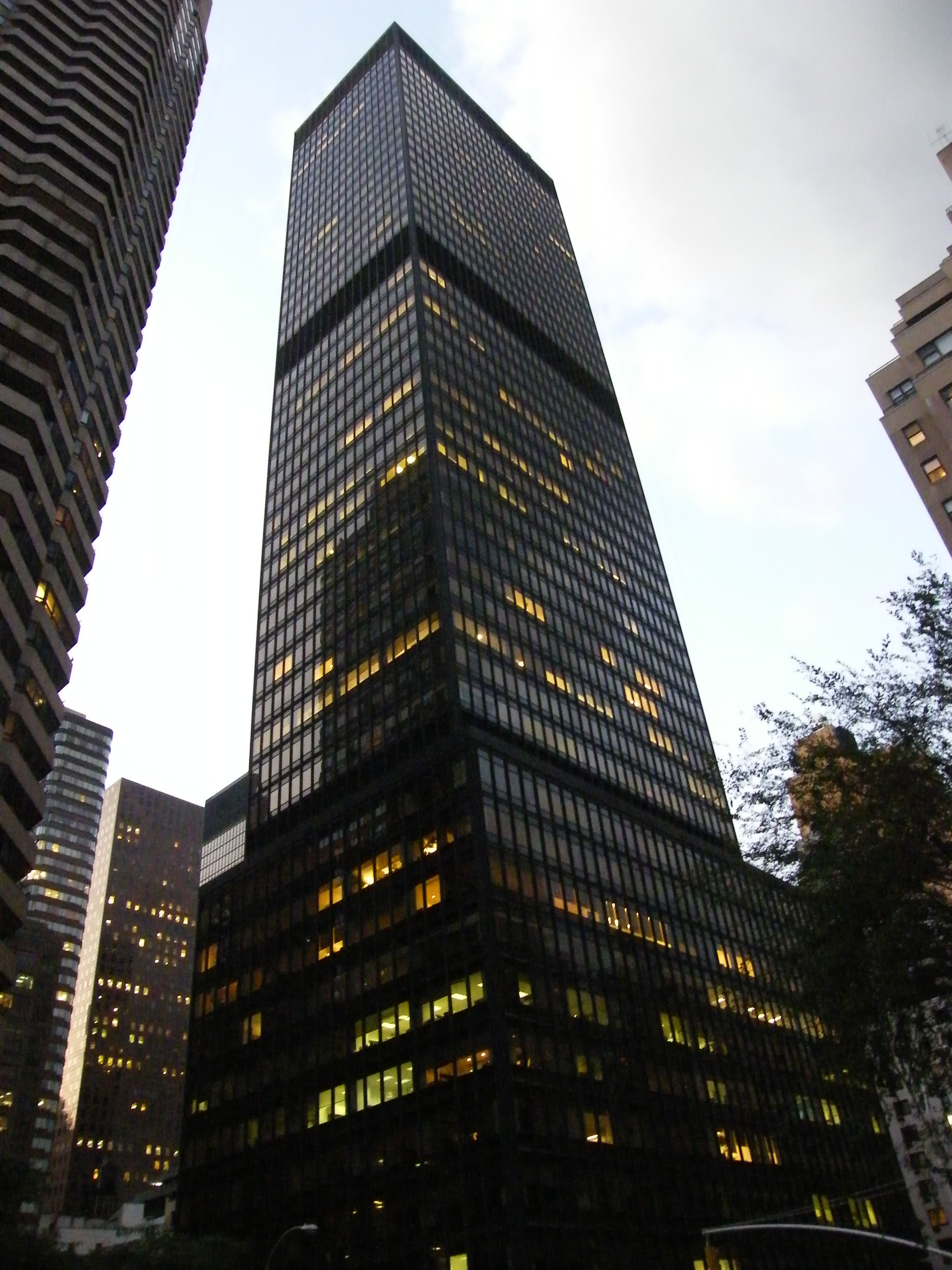
One Dag Hammarskjöld Plaza
885 Second Avenue
(1990–2009, 2017–present)

=== Residence ===
After World War II, the Swedish state looked for a residence building for the Swedish consul general. In 1946, the house at 600 Park Avenue was purchased for this reason. When the properties on 61-63 East 64th Street were for sale, the consulate were given the opportunity to make room for the consulate general and staff housing. This meant that a refurbishment of the interiors of the houses was necessary. The staff moved in during 1947. Shortly thereafter, the properties 604 and 608 Park Avenue were also acquired. The consulate general's business expanded considerably and in 1965 the Ministry for Foreign Affairs decided to move the office functions to more modern office premises.

The buildings have since 1981 been classified as "landmark", ie buildings with a historical value whose exteriors may not change. In 1984-85, the National Swedish Board of Public Building (Byggnadsstyrelsen), the National Property Board of Sweden's predecessor, carried out a thorough rebuilding of the four houses in order to achieve a functional housing for the consul general and as many apartments as possible. The construction work started in August 1984 and the houses were ready for occupancy in the fall of 1985. After the renovation, the properties had a total of 21 apartments, laundry rooms, storage rooms and a sauna. Well-known Swedish designers such as Carl Malmsten, Josef Frank, Carl-Axel Acking and Ingegerd Torhamn are represented in the interior. The works also included renovation of the facades.

The property, registered as 600, 604 and 608 Park Avenue and 61-63 East 64th Street, houses housing for Swedish personnel. In 2011–2013, the National Property Board of Sweden renovated the property after an ambitious care program with the aim of highlighting the cultural-historical values that were lost during previous renovations. The National Property Board of Sweden completed the major renovation of 600 Park Avenue with the renovation of adjacent facades and windows in 2014. For some time, the property was the residence of the Swedish UN ambassador.

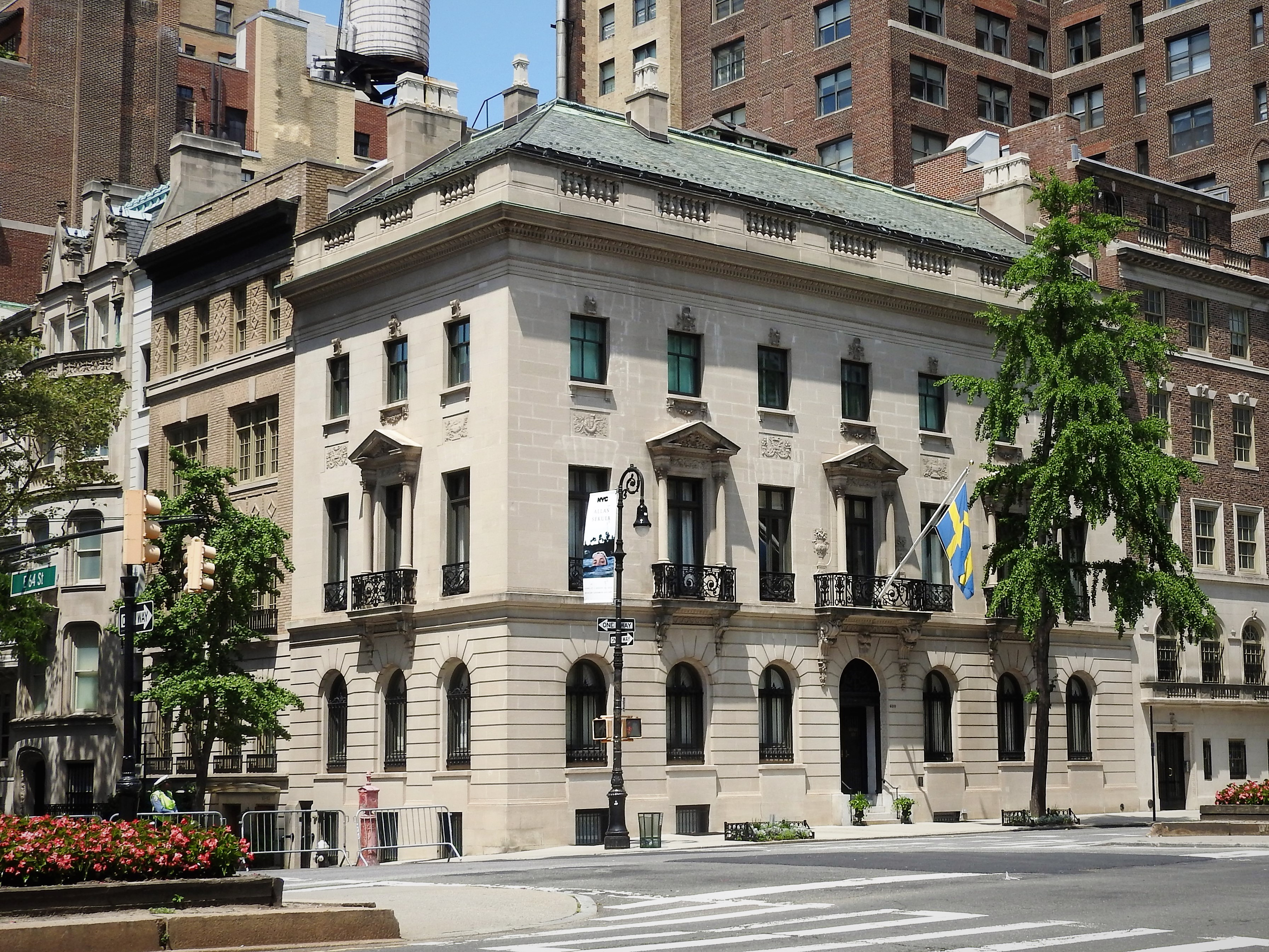
600 Park Avenue and East 64th Street

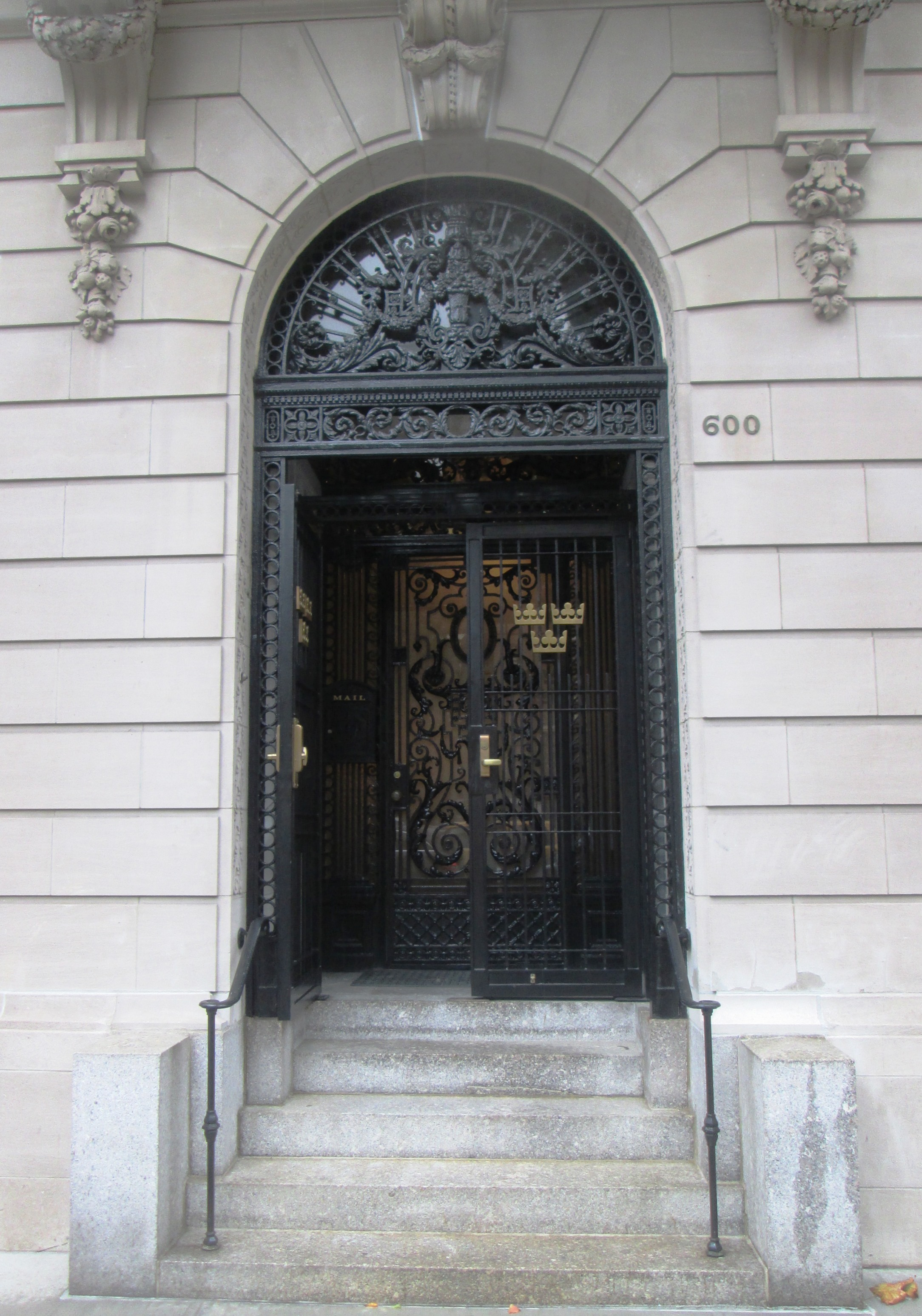
Entrance to the property on 600 Park Avenue and East 64th Street

== Heads of Mission ==
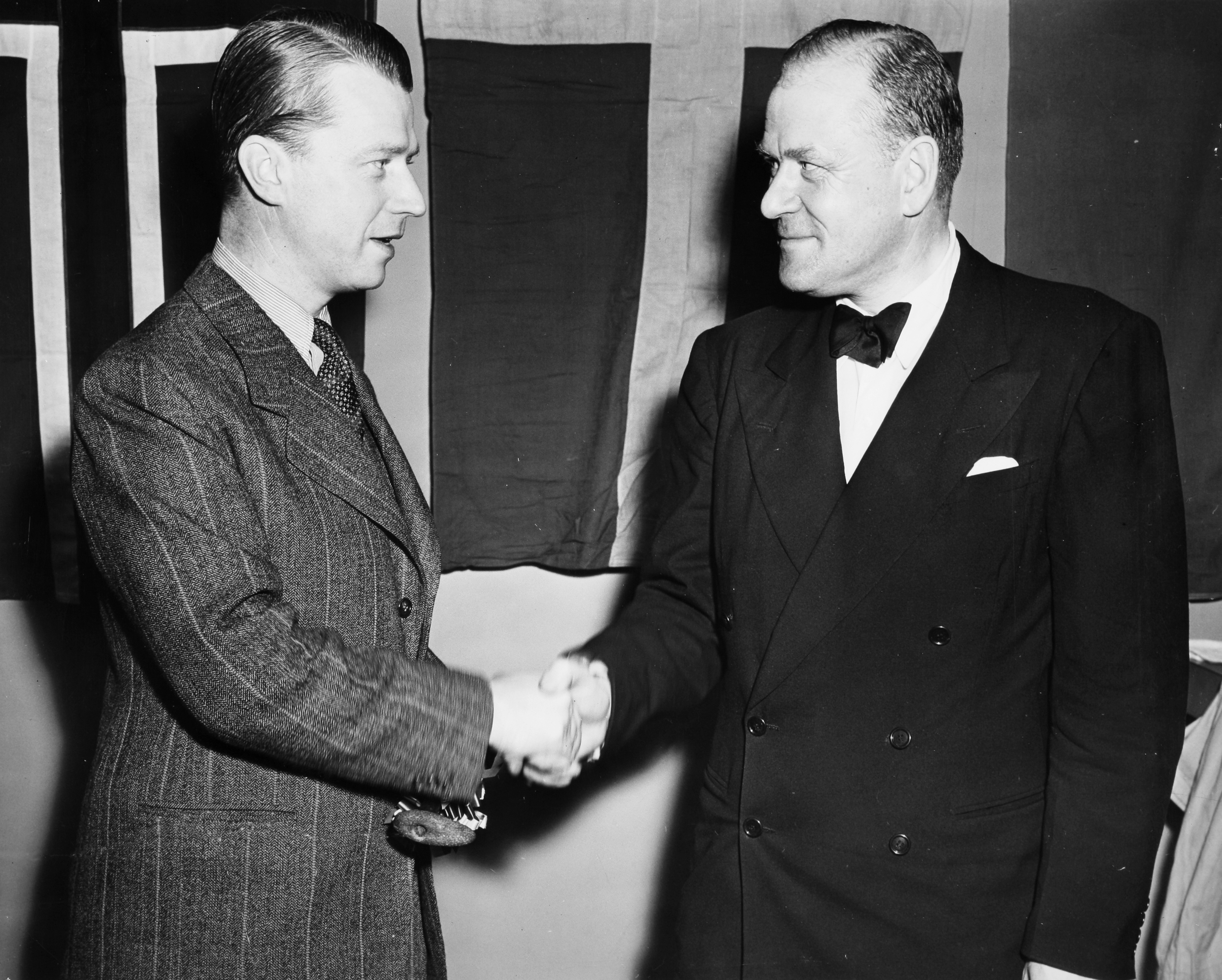
Consul general Lennart Nylander (right) with the CEO of SAS, Per Norlin, in New York City, September 1946.

Name	Period	Title	Notes	Ref
Consulate (1799–1913)
Henrik Gahn	November 21, 1799 – August 3, 1834	Consul		
Severin Lorich	August 1834 – March 11, 1837	Consul general		
Gustaf af Nordin	May 14, 1838 – October 9, 1845	Consul		
Adam Christopher Lövenskiold	December 10, 1846 – September 25, 1850	Consul; acting November 14, 1845		
Georg Sibbern	May 4, 1852 – April 20, 1858	Consul; acting September 25, 1850		
Carl Edvard Habicht	October 6, 1859 – November 11, 1870	Vice consul 1845; consul n.h.o.v. July 28, 1854		
Christian Börs	June 9, 1871 – June 19, 1890	Consul		
Carl Gustaf Marius Woxen	June 12, 1891 – May 13, 1898	Consul		
Christopher Ravn	June 30, 1899 – October 31, 1905	Consul		
Alexander Edward Johnson	November 3, 1905 – December 11, 1908	Acting consul general		
Magnus Clarholm	December 11, 1908 – December 31, 1913	Consul		
Consulate general (1914–2009)
Magnus Clarholm	January 1, 1914 – 1919	Consul general		
Claës Bonde	December 8, 1914 – February 12, 1915	Acting consul general		
Sven Magnusson Lagerberg	1916–1918	Acting consul general		
Nils Jaenson	1919–1919	Acting consul general		
Olof Lamm	1919–1921	Acting consul general		
Olof Lamm	1921–1933	Consul general		
Gustaf Weidel	1933–1935	Consul general		
Martin Kastengren	1935–1945	Consul general		
Lennart Nylander	1945–1955	Consul general		
Erik Kronvall	1955–1962	Consul general		
Love Kellberg	1963–1963	Consul general		
Tore Tallroth	October 1, 1963 (Note: Appointed on October 1, 1963; took office on November 11, 1963; date of recognition on March 17, 1964.) – 1972 (Note: Leave of absence between September 15, 1970 and June 30, 1972.)	Consul general		
Gunnar Lonaeus	October 27, 1970 – 1975	Consul general		
Carl-Henric Nauckhoff	1975–1978	Consul general		
Bengt Friedman	December 1, 1978 – 1983	Consul general		
Magnus Faxén	January 31, 1984 – 1988	Consul general	Political appointee (non-career diplomat)	
Arne Thorén	August 17, 1988 – 1992	Consul general	Political appointee (non-career diplomat)	
Dag Sebastian Ahlander	October 9, 1992 – 1998	Consul general		
Olle Wästberg	1999–2004	Consul general	Political appointee (non-career diplomat)	
Kjell Anneling	September 20, 2004 – 2006	Consul general		
Ulf Hjertonsson	March 1, 2006 – 2009	Consul general		
Honorary consulate general (2009–2016)
David E.R. Dangoor	December 29, 2009 – 2016	Honorary consul general		
Consulate general (2016–present)
Leif Pagrotsky	January 2016 – 2018	Consul general	Political appointee (non-career diplomat)	
Annika Rembe	October 1, 2018 – 2021	Consul general		
Camilla Mellander	2021–2024	Consul general		
Erik Ullenhag	2024–present	Consul general		

== See also ==
- Consulate General of Sweden, Chicago
- Consulate General of Sweden, Houston
- Consulate General of Sweden, Los Angeles
- Consulate General of Sweden, Minneapolis
- Consulate General of Sweden, San Francisco
