= Westerberg =

Westerberg may refer to:

== Places ==
- one of the four villages in the municipality of Winzenburg in Lower Saxony, Germany
- Westerberg (Baumberge), the highest hill in the Baumberge in North Rhine-Westphalia, Germany
- Westerberg (Lamstedt) a low ridge in the German state of Lower Saxony
- Westerberg (Osnabrück district), a district of Osnabrück, Lower Saxony, Germany

== People with the surname ==
- Alf Westerberg, Swedish football manager
- Art Westerberg, academic at Carnegie Mellon University
- Bengt Westerberg, Swedish politician, party leader, member of the Riksdag and deputy prime minister
- Caj Westerberg, Finnish writer
- Einar Westerberg, Swedish flight surgeon
- Jesper Westerberg, Swedish football player
- Karl Westerberg, better known as Manila Luzon, an American drag queen and reality television personality
- Kurt Westerberg (born 1950), American composer
- Lars Westerberg, CEO and President of the Swedish automotive safety company Autoliv
- Leif Westerberg, Swedish professional golfer
- Oscar Westerberg, American Major League Baseball player
- Paul Westerberg, American musician
- Per Westerberg, Swedish politician and Speaker of the Swedish Riksdag
- Stig Westerberg, Swedish conductor and pianist
- Victor J. Westerberg, American politician

== See also ==
- Maizels, Westerberg & Co., an investment banking firm
