= Minister for Government Coordination (Sweden) =

- Sveriges samordningsminister
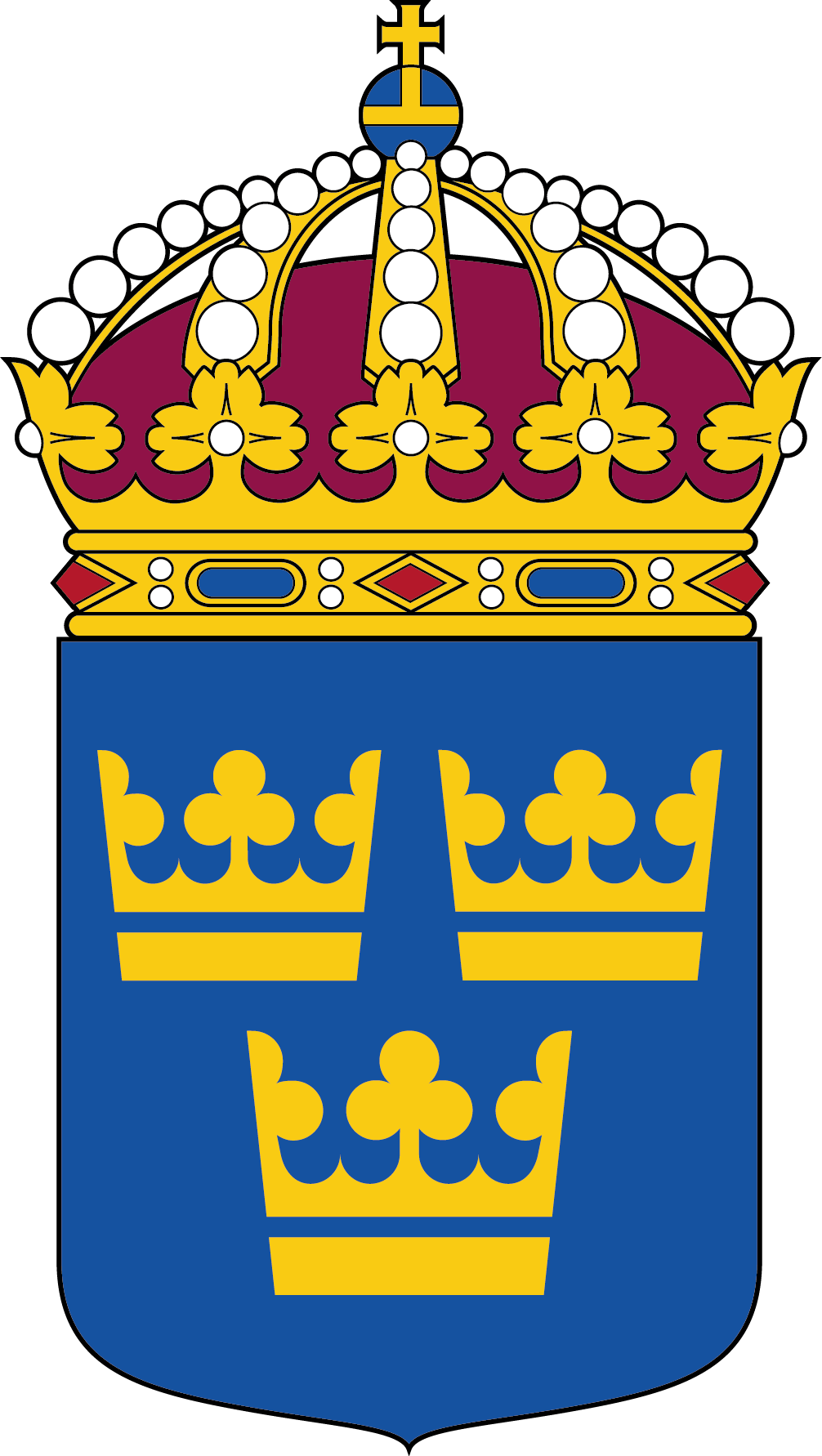

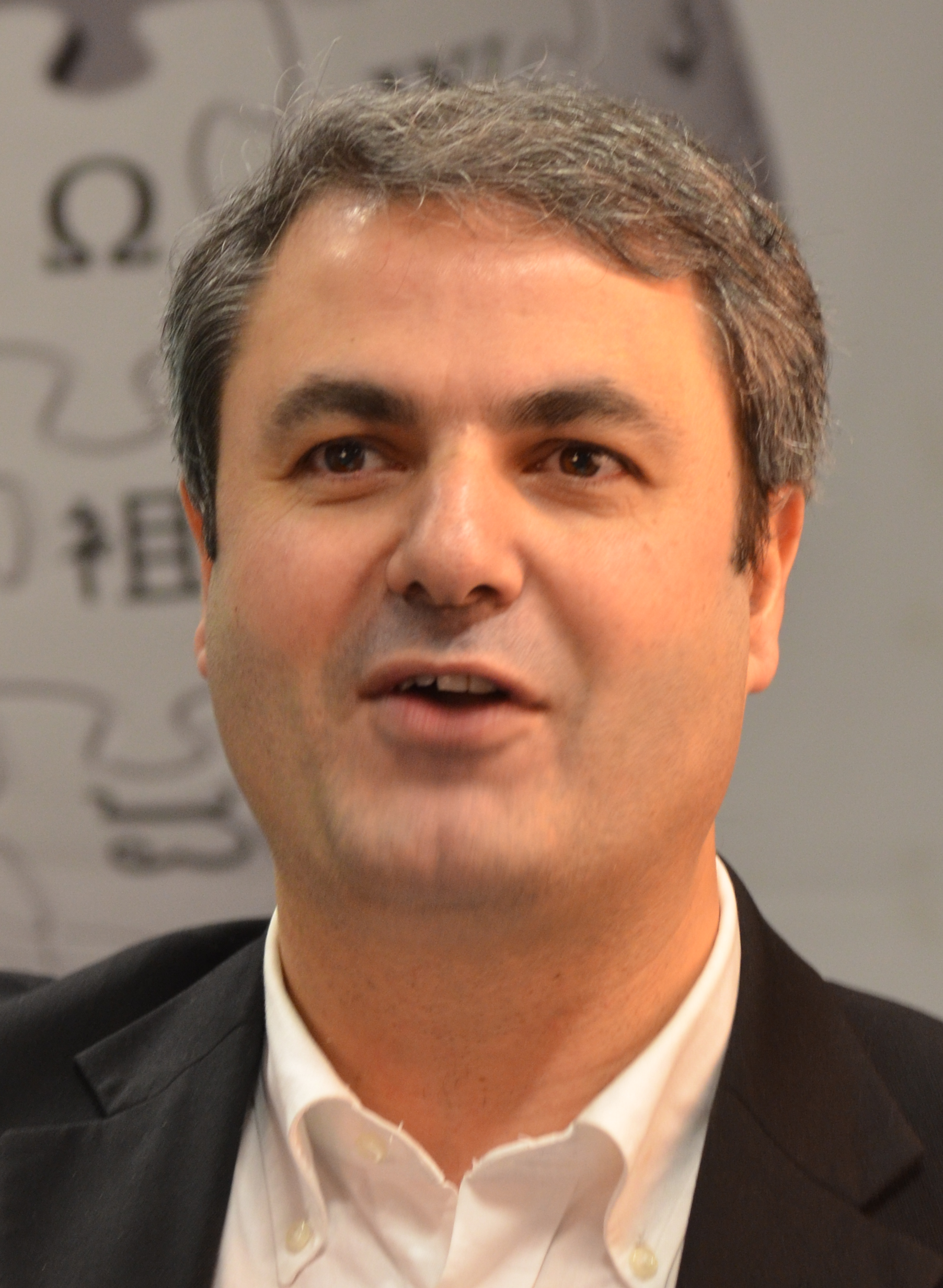
- The Prime Minister's Office
- Member of: The Government
- Appointer: The Prime Minister
- Term length: Serves at the pleasure of the Prime Minister
- Inaugural holder: Carl Lidbom
- Formation: 1975
- Final holder: Ibrahim Baylan
- Website: www.government.se

The Minister for Government Coordination (Swedish: Samordningsminister) is a cabinet minister within the Swedish government who is appointed by the Prime Minister of Sweden.

The minister is responsible for coordinating the government and being the Prime Minister's courier to the other ministries. The last minister for Government Coordination was Ibrahim Baylan, whose term ended on 21 January 2019.

== List of officeholders ==
=== Minister for Government Coordination 1975–1976 ===
Name	Term	Political Party	Other positions	Prime Minister	Government	Coalition
Carl Lidbom	1975	Social Democrats	Minister of Commerce and Industry	Olof Palme	Palme I	S
Thage G. Peterson	1975–1976	Social Democrats	–	Olof Palme	Palme I	S
Position abolished between 1976 and 1978
=== Minister for Government Coordination 1978–1979 ===
Carl Tham	1978–1979	Liberal People's Party	Minister for Energy	Ola Ullsten	Ullsten	L
Position abolished between 1979 and 1994
=== Minister for Government Coordination 1994–1998 ===
Jan Nygren	1994–1996	Social Democrats	–	Ingvar Carlsson	Carlsson III	S
Leif Pagrotsky	1996–1997	Social Democrats	–	Göran Persson	Persson	S
Thage G. Peterson	1997–1998	Social Democrats	Minister for Industry	Göran Persson	Persson	S
Position abolished between 1998 and 2002
=== Minister for Government Coordination 2002–2004 ===
Pär Nuder	2002–2004	Social Democrats	–	Göran Persson	Persson	S
Position abolished between 2004 and 2005
=== Minister for Government Coordination 2005–2006 ===
Bosse Ringholm	2005–2006	Social Democrats	Minister for EU Affairs	Göran Persson	Persson	S
Position abolished between 2006 and 2016
=== Minister for Government Coordination 2016–2019 ===
Ibrahim Baylan	2016–2019	Social Democrats	Minister for Energy	Stefan Löfven	Löfven I	S–MP
