= Minister for Business and Industry (Sweden) =

Swedish cabinet position

Minister for Energy, Business and Industry of Sweden
- Energi- och näringsminister
- Lesser coat of arms of Sweden

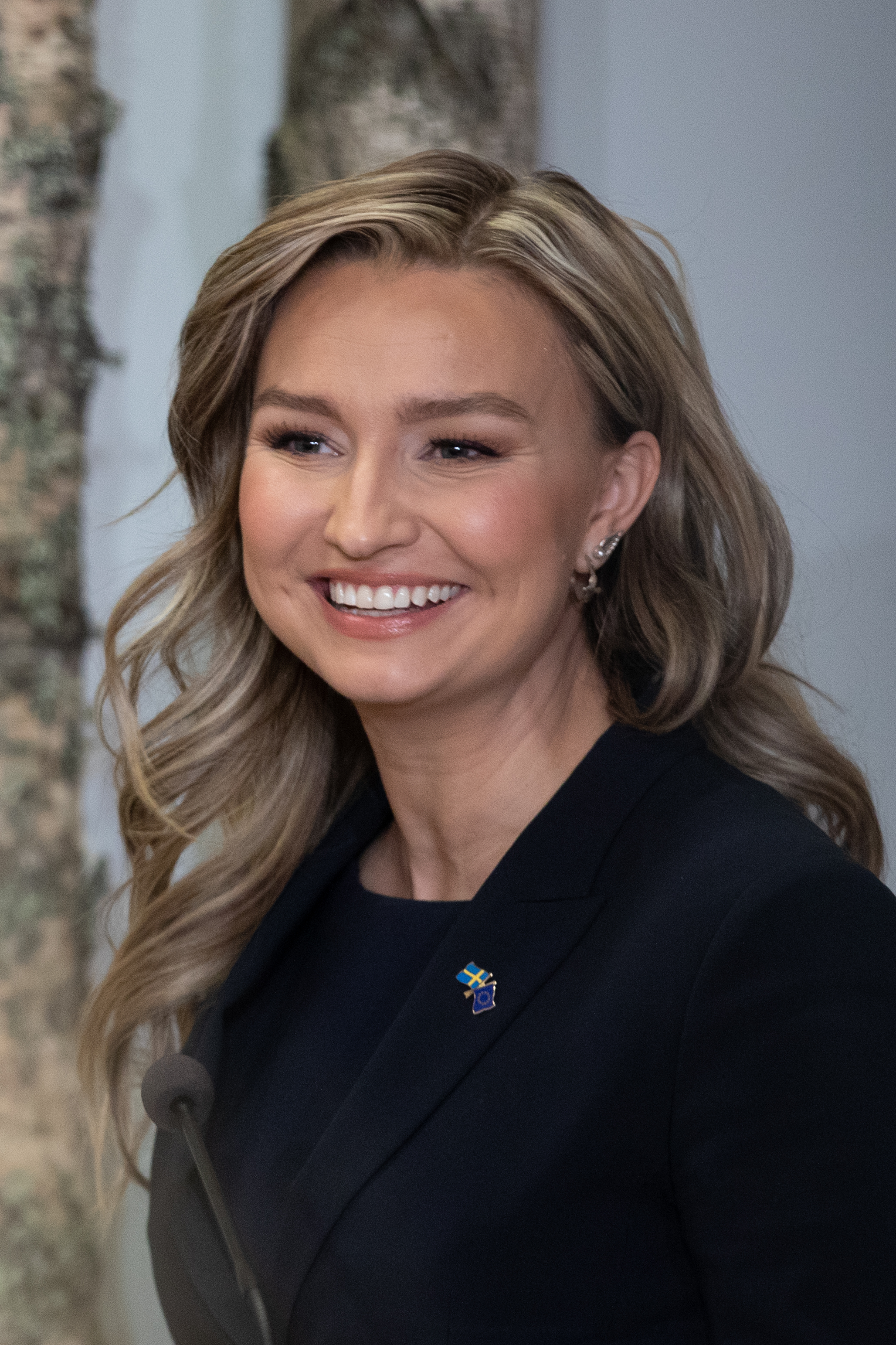
- Incumbent; Ebba Busch since 18 October 2022
- Ministry of Climate and Enterprise
- Appointer: The Prime Minister
- Term length: No fixed term; Serves as long as the Prime Minister sees fit
- Inaugural holder: Krister Wickman (1969); Per Westerberg (1991)
- Formation: First formation: 1 January 1969; Reformation: 22 October 1991
- Website: www.regeringen.se/sb/d/15192

The Minister for Energy, Business and Industry, (Swedish: energi- och näringsminister), formally cabinet minister and head of the Ministry of Climate and Enterprise, is a member and minister of the Government of Sweden and is appointed by the Prime Minister. The minister is responsible for policies related to enterprise, industry and innovation.

The current minister is Ebba Busch of the Christian Democrats.

== History ==
Until 1991, the office was named minister of industry (industriminister). The office has later been called minister for industry, employment and communications (näringsminister), minister for enterprise and innovation (närings- och innovationsminister), minister for business, industry and innovation (näringsminister), and minister for energy, business and industry (energi- och näringsminister).

Since 2014, the minister has been especially responsible for business, industry, enterprise and innovation. This includes small and medium enterprises, state-owned enterprises and industrial policy.

== List of ministers ==
Ministers of Industry (1969–1991)
No.	Minister		Took office	Left office	Time in office	Political party	Prime Minister(s)
1	Krister Wickman	Krister Wickman (1924–1993)	1 January 1969	30 June 1971	2 years, 180 days	Social Democrats	Olof Palme (S)
2	Rune B. Johansson	Rune B. Johansson (1915–1982)	30 June 1971	8 October 1976	5 years, 100 days	Social Democrats	Olof Palme (S)
3	Nils G. Åsling	Nils G. Åsling (1927–2017)	8 October 1976	18 October 1978	2 years, 10 days	Centre	Thorbjörn Fälldin (C)
4	Erik Huss	Erik Huss (1913–2010)	18 October 1978	12 October 1979	359 days	Liberals	Ola Ullsten (L)
(3)	Nils G. Åsling	Nils G. Åsling (1927–2017)	12 October 1979	8 October 1982	2 years, 361 days	Centre	Thorbjörn Fälldin (C)
5	Thage G. Peterson	Thage G. Peterson (born 1933)	8 October 1982	30 September 1988	5 years, 358 days	Social Democrats	Olof Palme (S) (8 October 1982 – 28 February 1986); Ingvar Carlsson (S) (13 March 1986 – 30 September 1988)
6	Ivar Nordberg	Ivar Nordberg (1933–2014)	4 October 1988	11 January 1990	1 year, 103 days	Social Democrats	Ingvar Carlsson (S)
7	Rune Molin	Rune Molin (1931–2011)	12 January 1990	4 October 1991	1 year, 266 days	Social Democrats	Ingvar Carlsson (S)
Ministers for Industry, Employment and Communications (1991–2014)
8	Per Westerberg	Per Westerberg (born 1951)	4 October 1991	7 October 1994	3 years, 3 days	Moderate	Carl Bildt (M)
9	Sten Heckscher	Sten Heckscher (born 1942)	7 October 1994	5 February 1996	1 year, 121 days	Social Democrats	Ingvar Carlsson (S)
10	Jörgen Andersson	Jörgen Andersson (born 1946)	5 February 1996	22 March 1996	46 days	Social Democrats	Ingvar Carlsson (S)
11	Anders Sundström	Anders Sundström (born 1952)	22 March 1996	7 October 1998	2 years, 199 days	Social Democrats	Göran Persson (S)
12	Björn Rosengren	Björn Rosengren (born 1942)	7 October 1998	15 October 2002	4 years, 8 days	Social Democrats	Göran Persson (S)
–	Mona Sahlin	Mona Sahlin (born 1957); Acting	15 October 2002	21 October 2002	6 days	Social Democrats	Göran Persson (S)
13	Leif Pagrotsky	Leif Pagrotsky (born 1951)	21 October 2002	21 October 2004	2 years, 0 days	Social Democrats	Göran Persson (S)
14	Thomas Östros	Thomas Östros (born 1965)	21 October 2004	6 October 2006	1 year, 350 days	Social Democrats	Göran Persson (S)
15	Maud Olofsson	Maud Olofsson (born 1955)	6 October 2006	29 September 2011	4 years, 358 days	Centre	Fredrik Reinfeldt (M)
16	Annie Lööf	Annie Lööf (born 1983)	29 September 2011	3 October 2014	3 years, 4 days	Centre	Fredrik Reinfeldt (M)
Ministers for Enterprise and Innovation (2014–2019)
17	Mikael Damberg	Mikael Damberg (born 1971)	3 October 2014	21 January 2019	4 years, 110 days	Social Democrats	Stefan Löfven (S)
Ministers for Business, Industry and Innovation (2019–2022)
18	Ibrahim Baylan	Ibrahim Baylan (born 1972)	21 January 2019	30 November 2021	2 years, 313 days	Social Democrats	Stefan Löfven (S)
19	Karl-Petter Thorwaldsson	Karl-Petter Thorwaldsson (born 1964)	30 November 2021	18 October 2022	4 years, 326 days	Social Democrats	Magdalena Andersson (S)
Ministers for Energy, Business and Industry (2022–present)
20	Ebba Busch	Ebba Busch (born 1987)	18 October 2022	Incumbent	4 years, 4 days	Christian Democrats	Ulf Kristersson (M)
