= Nils G. Åsling =

Swedish politician (1927–2017)

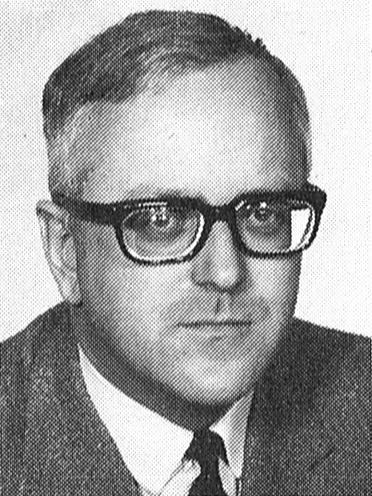
- Nils G. Åsling in the 1970s

Minister of Industry
- In office 12 October 1979 – 8 October 1982
- Preceded by: Erik Huss
- Succeeded by: Thage G. Peterson
- In office 8 October 1976 – 18 October 1978
- Preceded by: Rune B. Johansson
- Succeeded by: Erik Huss

Chairman of the Finance Committee
- In office 1974 – 8 October 1976
- Preceded by: Sven Ekström
- Succeeded by: Björn Molin

Member of the Riksdag
- In office 1969–1988

Personal details
- Born: 15 December 1927 Krokom, Sweden
- Died: 12 August 2017 (aged 89) Stockholm, Sweden
- Party: Centre Party
- Occupation: politician

Nils Gunnar Åsling (15 December 1927 – 12 August 2017) was a Swedish politician in the Centre Party who served as minister for industry from 1976 to 1978, before returning to the post from 1979 to 1982, and as member of the Swedish parliament from 1969 to 1988.

== Career ==
Åsling was born in Alsen, Sweden as the son of a farmer. He studied at the Stockholm University College from 1954 to 1956 where he got a degree in social work in 1955. He worked at Jordbrukarnas föreningsblad, an agricultural newspaper, from 1953 to 1965 and was then head of communications at the forest industry company Norrlands Skogsägares Cellulosa AB from 1963 to 1969. First entering the Riksdag as a member of the Centre Party in 1969, Åsling chaired the Finance Committee of the Riksdag from 1974 to 1976, after which he was named minister for industry in the Fälldin I Cabinet. Åsling was subsequently replaced by Erik Huss in 1978, only to be reappointed in 1979 as part of the Fälldin II Cabinet. He served as minister in a period of industrial reorganisation of the heavy industry of Sweden, following a series of crises in the 1970s. This included the creation of steel company Svenskt Stål AB by the government takeover of a number of loss-making steel companies. The government involvement in several industries received criticism for being very costly, with long-lasting subsidies to shipmaker Svenska Varv an often cited example.

After a change of government following the 1982 Swedish general election, Åsling served as chair of Sveriges Föreningsbank (a forerunner of Föreningsbanken) from 1983 to 1992. He continued serving as a member of the Riksdag until 1988.

His son Per Åsling has also served on the Riksdag. Nils Åsling died in Stockholm at the age of 89 on 12 August 2017.
