= Baylan (disambiguation) =

Ibrahim Baylan (born 1972) is a Swedish politician.

"Baylan" may also refer to:

- Baylan Skoll, a fictional character in Star Wars
- A baylan is a Filipino shaman.
