= Ibrahim Baylan =

Swedish politician and Minister of Enterprise

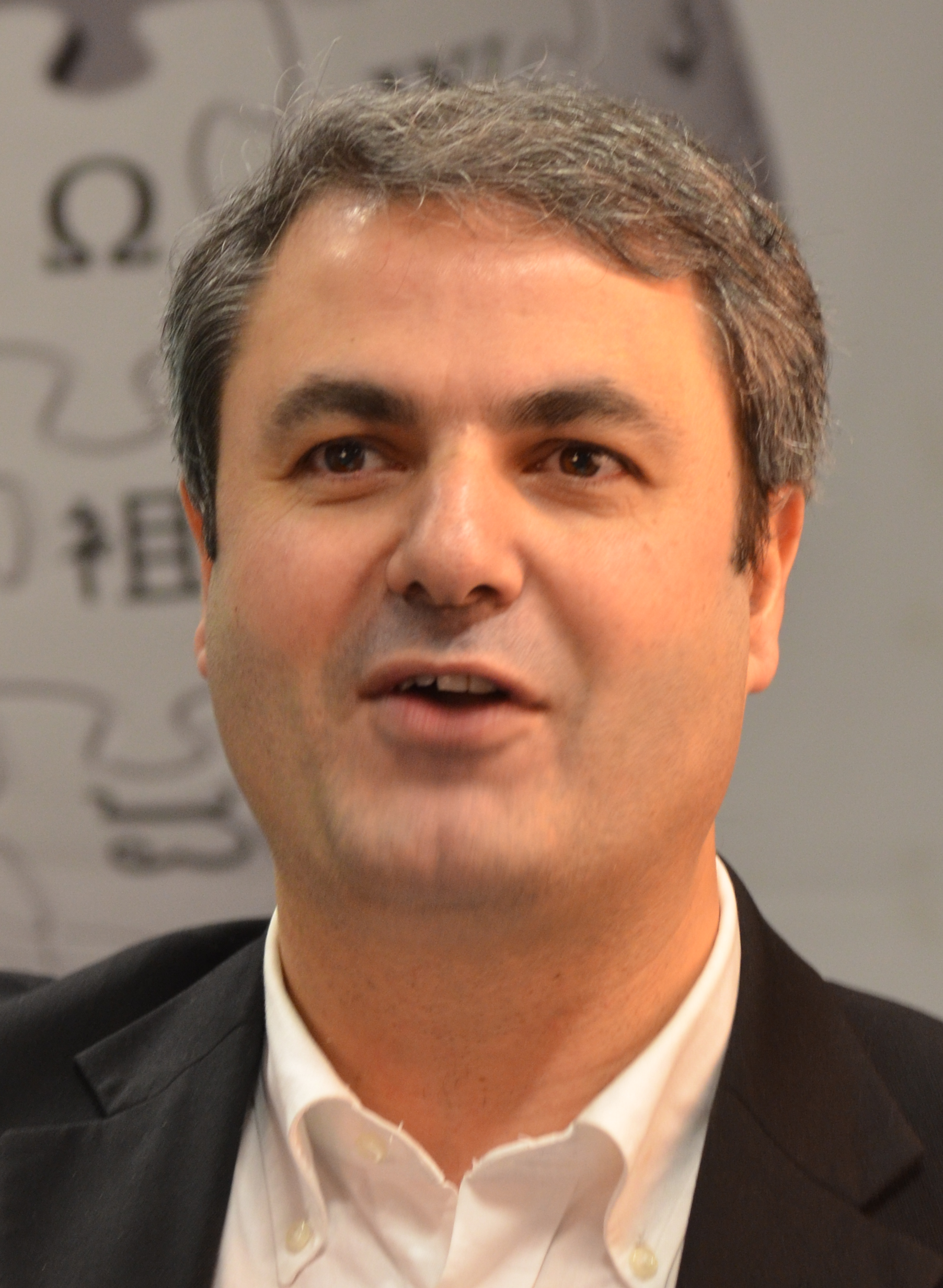
- Ibrahim Baylan in October 2012

Minister for Business, Industry and Innovation
- In office 21 January 2019 – 30 November 2021
- Monarch: Carl XVI Gustaf
- Prime Minister: Stefan Löfven
- Preceded by: Mikael Damberg
- Succeeded by: Karl-Petter Thorwaldsson

Minister for Government Coordination
- In office 25 May 2016 – 21 January 2019
- Monarch: Carl XVI Gustaf
- Prime Minister: Stefan Löfven
- Preceded by: Office created
- Succeeded by: Office abolished

Minister for Energy
- In office 3 October 2014 – 21 January 2019
- Monarch: Carl XVI Gustaf
- Prime Minister: Stefan Löfven
- Preceded by: Anna-Karin Hatt
- Succeeded by: Anders Ygeman

Minister for Schools
- In office 1 November 2004 – 6 October 2006
- Monarch: Carl XVI Gustaf
- Prime Minister: Göran Persson
- Preceded by: Thomas Östros
- Succeeded by: Jan Björklund

Member of the Swedish Riksdag
- In office 30 November 2021 – 28 June 2022
- Succeeded by: Azadeh Rojhan Gustafsson
- Constituency: Stockholm County
- In office 6 October 2006 – 3 October 2014
- Constituency: Västerbotten County

Personal details
- Born: 15 March 1972 (age 54) Mardin, Turkey
- Party: Social Democratic

Ibrahim Baylan (born 15 March 1972) is a Swedish politician who served as minister for schools from 2004 to 2006, as minister for energy from 2014 to 2019, minister for government coordination from 2016 to 2019 and as minister for business, industry and innovation from 2019 to 2021.

He has been a member of the Swedish Riksdag since 2006, and was deputy chairman in the education committee and spokesperson of educational issues for the Swedish Social Democratic Party from 2012 to 2014.

== Early life and career ==
Ibrahim Baylan was born in Salah, a village in the Mardin Province of Southeast Turkey, and his family belongs to the Assyrian Christian people group in Turkey.

He studied economics at Umeå University and was engaged in student politics. In 1997 he became the chair of the Swedish Social Democratic Youth League in Umeå. The same year, he was elected chair of the Umeå Union of Students and also became a member of the municipal school board.

From 2000 Baylan worked as an ombudsman for the Swedish Union of Commercial Salaried Employees. He ran unsuccessfully on the Social Democratic ballot for the 2004 European Parliament election. Later in the same year, he was appointed to be minister for schools by Prime Minister Göran Persson, becoming the first non-European immigrant to become a member of a Swedish government cabinet. 2007 he was elected chairman of the Swedish parliamentary committee of transportation and communication. 2009 he became secretary general of the Swedish Social Democratic party. He resigned in March 2011.

As school minister he was involved in a controversy about a report from the Swedish National Agency for Education that was withdrawn after criticism from minister Baylan. He was reported to the Swedish Committee on the Constitution and called to a hearing on 12 April 2005.

Baylan was appointed energy minister with placement in the Ministry of the Environment at the change of government after the parliamentary elections 2014. In June 2016, he presented an agreement between the government, Moderate Party, Centre Party and the Christian Democrats on Sweden's long-term energy policy. In a government reshuffle in 2016, Baylan was also appointed coordination minister.

In September 2021, Baylan announced that he would be stepping down as minister in the autumn. He expressed it was time to try something else.

== Personal life ==
Baylan married Anna Nilsson in Luleå in June 2006. He has two children.

Party political offices
Preceded by Marita Ulvskog	Secretary-General of the Social Democrats; 2009—2011	Succeeded by Carin Jämtin
Political offices
Preceded by Thomas Östros	Minister for Schools; 2004—2006	Succeeded by Jan Björklund
Preceded by Anna-Karin Hatt	Minister for Energy; 2014–2019	Succeeded by Anders Ygeman
Preceded by Office created	Minister for Government Coordination; 2016–2019	Succeeded by Office abolished
Preceded by Mikael Damberg	Minister for Enterprise; 2019–2021	Succeeded by Karl-Petter Thorwaldsson
