= Thage G. Peterson =

Swedish politician (born 1933)

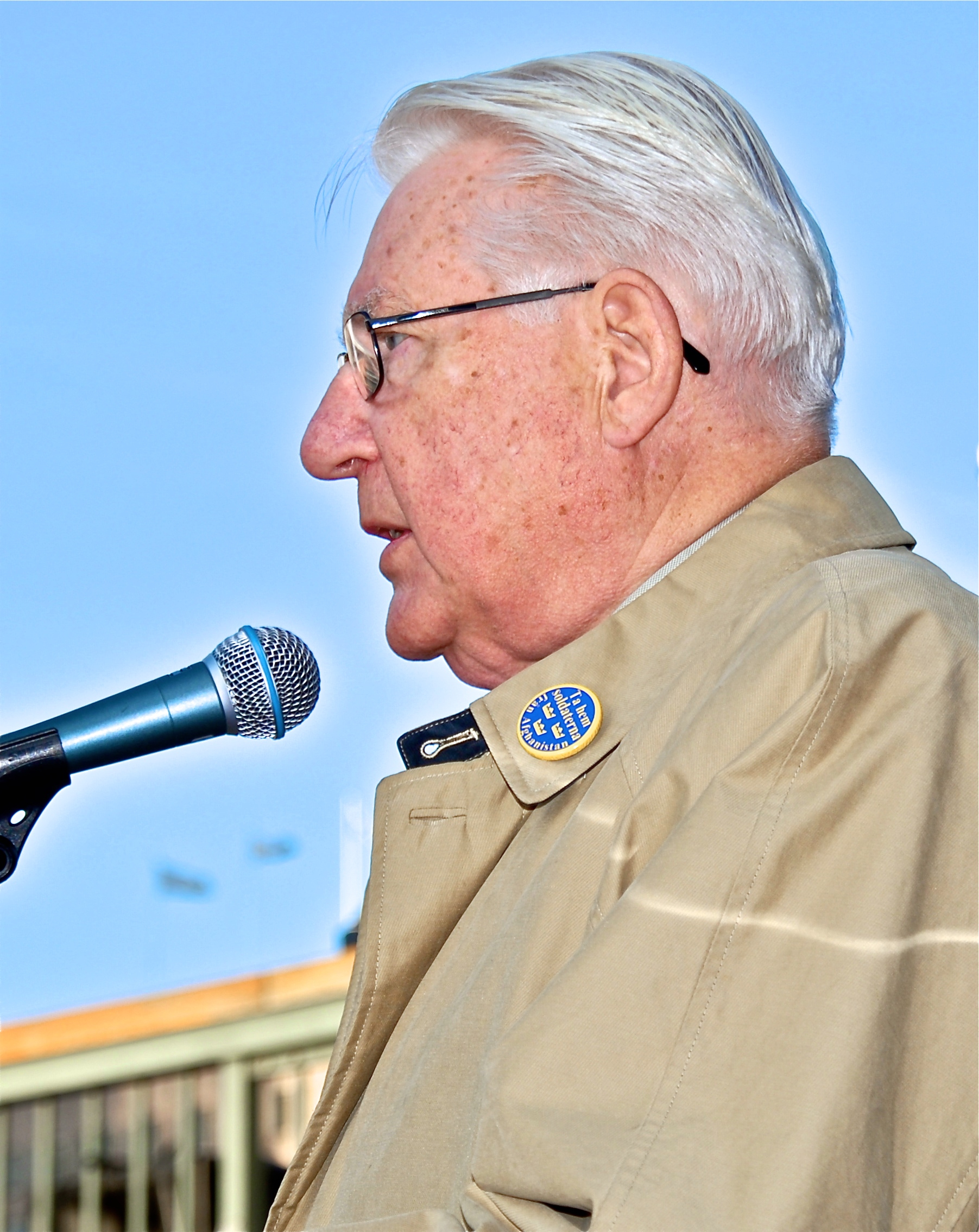
- Peterson speaking at Sergel's Square in 2010

Speaker of the Riksdag
- In office 3 October 1988 – 30 September 1991
- Monarch: Carl XVI Gustaf
- Preceded by: Ingemund Bengtsson
- Succeeded by: Ingegerd Troedsson

Member of the Riksdag
- In office 1971–1998
- Constituency: Stockholm County
Ministerial offices
Minister for Government Coordination
In office 1 February 1997 – 7 October 1998
Prime Minister	Göran Persson
Preceded by	Leif Pagrotsky
Succeeded by	Lena Hjelm-Wallén
In office 1 November 1975 – 8 October 1976
Prime Minister	Olof Palme
Preceded by	Carl Lidbom
Succeeded by	Carl Tham
Minister for Defence
In office 7 October 1994 – 1 February 1997
Prime Minister	Ingvar Carlsson; Göran Persson
Preceded by	Anders Björck
Succeeded by	Björn von Sydow
Minister of Industry
In office 8 October 1982 – 30 September 1988
Prime Minister	Olof Palme; Ingvar Carlsson
Preceded by	Nils G. Åsling
Succeeded by	Ivar Nordberg
Minister for Justice
In office 7 June 1988 – 30 September 1988
Prime Minister	Ingvar Carlsson
Preceded by	Anna-Greta Leijon
Succeeded by	Laila Freivalds

Personal details
- Born: 24 September 1933 (age 92) Berg, Sweden
- Awards: Illis quorum 1998

Thage Edvin Gerhard Peterson (born 24 September 1933) is a Swedish retired politician who served as Speaker of the Riksdag from 1988 to 1991. A senior member of the Swedish Social Democratic Party (SAP), he held various key ministerial positions, most notably serving as Minister of Industry from 1982 to 1988 and as Minister for Defence from 1994 to 1997.

== Early life ==
Peterson was born on 24 September 1933 in Berg, Kronoberg County, Sweden, the son of Edvin Peterson, a churchwarden, and his wife Martina (née Jonasson). He worked as an agricultural labourer from 1947 to 1951 and graduated from the South Swedish School of Social Work in Lund in 1957.

== Career ==
=== Early career ===
Peterson worked as a municipal accountant from 1957 to 1958 and at the National Organization of People's Hall Societies (Folkets Husföreningarnas Riksorganisation) from 1958 to 1964. He worked as national secretary and vice chairman of the Swedish Social Democratic Youth League from 1964 to 1967, as head of the People's Hall and CEO of the National Organization of People's Hall Societies from 1967 to 1971.

=== Political career ===
Peterson was first elected a member of parliament in 1971. He first served as state secretary in the Prime Minister's Office from 1971 to 1975, and then as minister without portfolio, responsible for government coordination in Palme I Cabinet from 1975 to 1976. When the Social Democrats returned to power following the 1982 election, Peterson was made minister of industry, and remained on this post until 1988, in the Palme II Cabinet and the Carlsson I Cabinet. In addition, he briefly served as acting minister for justice and head of the Ministry of Justice in 1988 following the resignation of Anna-Greta Leijon. Peterson then served as Speaker of the Riksdag from 1988 to 1991.

Peterson was chairman of the Committee on the Constitution from 1991 to 1994, and following the 1994 election, he returned to the Carlsson III Cabinet as minister of defence and head of the Ministry of Defence, and remained in this post until 1997. He then served as minister in the Prime Minister's Office from 1997 to 1998.

Peterson was a member of the War Delegation from 1982 to 1998 and of the Advisory Council on Foreign Affairs from 1988 to 1997. He was vice chairman of the National Swedish Touring Theatre from 1967 to 1972, municipal council in Nacka from 1967 to 1974, chairman in government inquiries, board member of A-Pressen from 1973 to 1975, member of the executive committee of the Swedish Social Democratic Party board from 1975 to 1990, chairman of Stockholm County social democratic party district from 1974 to 1989, member of the Riksdag from 1971 to 1998, Board of Governors of the Sveriges Riksbank from 1976 to 1982, and a member of the Nordic Council from 1976 to 1982.

== Personal life ==
In 1962, Peterson married Marion Karlsson (born 1935), the daughter of Thure Karlsson and Lisa (née Johansson).

== Awards and decorations ==
- Illis quorum (1998)

== Selected bibliography ==
- Peterson, Thage G. (2021). Elin i mitt liv: om Elin Wägner och mitt unga jag : ett axplock ur våra möten [Elin in my life: about Elin Wägner and my young self: a selection from our meetings] (in Swedish). Stockholm: Carlssons. ISBN 9789189063761. LIBRIS: m0jzsmsjkvkchsbb.
- Peterson, Thage G. (2006). En bok om Rönneberga [A book about Rönneberga] (in Swedish). Lidingö: Rönneberga kursgård. ISBN 9163169029. LIBRIS: 10374228.
- Peterson, Thage G. (2002). Olof Palme som jag minns honom [Olof Palme as I remember him] (in Swedish). Stockholm: Bonnier. ISBN 9100580422. LIBRIS: 8560550.
- Peterson, Thage G. (2000). Resan till Berg: ska hela Sverige leva? : en tidsresa [The journey to Berg: should all of Sweden live? : a time travel] (in Swedish). Stockholm: Bonnier. ISBN 9100574104. LIBRIS: 7150494.
- Peterson, Thage G. (1999). Resan mot Mars: anteckningar och minnen [The Journey to Mars: Notes and Memories] (in Swedish). Stockholm: Bonnier. ISBN 9100570206. LIBRIS: 8345216.

Political offices
Preceded by Anna-Greta Leijon	Minister for Justice; 1988–1988	Succeeded by Laila Freivalds
Preceded by Anders Björck	Minister of Defence; 1994–1997	Succeeded by Björn von Sydow
Preceded by Ingemund Bengtsson	Speaker of the Riksdag; 1988–1991	Succeeded by Ingegerd Troedsson
Order of precedence
Preceded by Kirstine von Blixen-Finecke as Mistress of the Robes	Swedish order of precedence as former Speaker of the Riksdag	Succeeded by Björn von Sydow as former Speaker of the Riksdag
