= Björn von Sydow =

Swedish politician (born 1945)

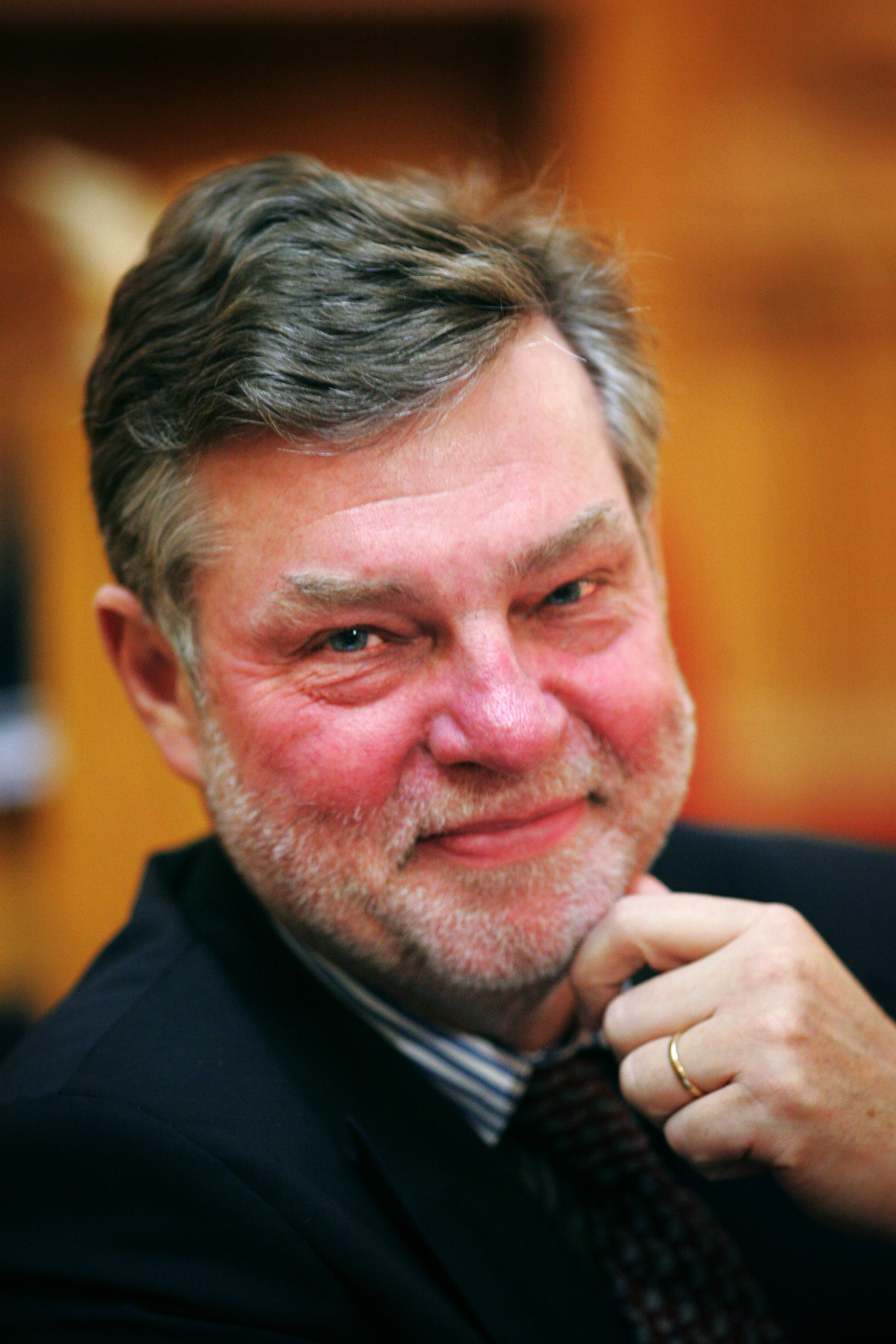
- von Sydow in November 2004

Speaker of the Riksdag
- In office 30 September 2002 – 2 October 2006
- Monarch: Carl XVI Gustaf
- Preceded by: Birgitta Dahl
- Succeeded by: Per Westerberg

Minister for Defence
- In office 1 February 1997 – 30 September 2002
- Prime Minister: Göran Persson
- Preceded by: Thage G. Peterson
- Succeeded by: Leni Björklund

Minister of Trade
- In office 22 March 1996 – 31 January 1997
- Prime Minister: Göran Persson
- Preceded by: Mats Hellström
- Succeeded by: Leif Pagrotsky

Personal details
- Born: 26 November 1945 (age 80)
- Party: Social Democratic
- Occupation: Politician

Björn Gustaf von Sydow (born 26 November 1945) is a former speaker (talman) of the Riksdag, the Swedish parliament. He held this office following the 2002 election, when he succeeded Birgitta Dahl, until he was replaced on 2 October 2006. A member of the Swedish Social Democratic Party, he had been Minister for Defence in Göran Persson's government between 1997 and 2002, preceded by a short term as Minister of Trade.

Apart from leading the Riksdag sessions, von Sydow was also while in office eligible to serve as acting-regent (Riksföreståndare) in the absence of the King and his three children, e.g. if they all went abroad simultaneously, although that never happened.

The speaker also had a key role when the government resigned. However, when Göran Persson asked for his resignation after the lost 2006 election, the parliamentary situation was very clear, so already on 19 September 2006 Sydow could formally ask Fredrik Reinfeldt to begin the formation of a new government to take office after the new Riksdag has assembled to approve it. On 2 October 2006, the changed majority situation in the Riksdag also had Sydow replaced by Moderate Party politician and previous Vice Speaker Per Westerberg. Already before the election, Sydow had stated that he was not interested in a Vice Speaker position, so that office went to fellow Social Democrat Jan Björkman.

von Sydow was awarded a Ph.D. in political science at Linköping University in 1978, and later worked as rector of the Social Work College at Stockholm University. In 2008, he was elected a member of the Royal Swedish Academy of Sciences.

Björn von Sydow has taken his mother's surname and is a distant relative of the actor Max von Sydow. He lives in Solna outside Stockholm, is married and has four children.

Political offices
Preceded by Mats Hellström	Minister of Trade; 1996–1997	Succeeded by Leif Pagrotsky
Preceded by Thage G. Peterson	Minister for Defence; 1997–2002	Succeeded by Leni Björklund
Preceded by Birgitta Dahl	Speaker of the Riksdag; 2002–2006	Succeeded by Per Westerberg
Order of precedence
Preceded by Thage G. Peterson as former Speaker of the Riksdag	Swedish order of precedence as former Speaker of the Riksdag	Succeeded by Per Westerberg as former Speaker of the Riksdag
Professional and academic associations
Preceded by Sverker Göranson	President of the Royal Swedish Academy of War Sciences; 2022–2026	Succeeded by Jonas Haggren
