= Karl-Petter Thorwaldsson =

Swedish union leader

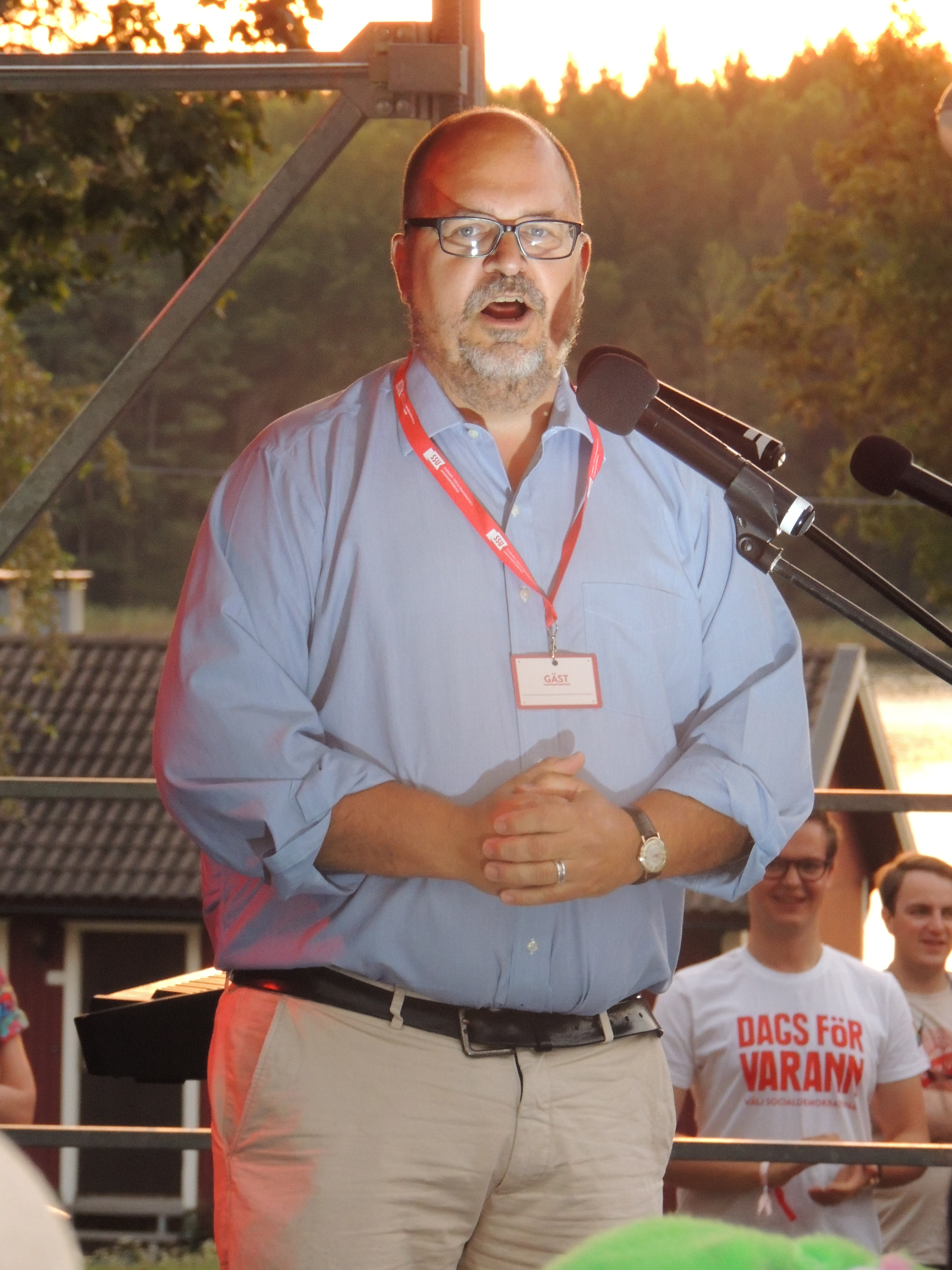

Minister for Business, Industry and Innovation
- In office 30 November 2021 – 17 October 2022
- Monarch: Carl XVI Gustaf
- Prime Minister: Magdalena Andersson
- Preceded by: Ibrahim Baylan
- Succeeded by: Ebba Busch

Personal details
- Born: 26 December 1964 (age 61) Lessebo, Sweden
- Party: Social Democratic

Karl-Petter "Kålle" Thorwaldsson (born 26 December 1964) is a Swedish union leader and politician who has served as Minister for Business, Industry and Innovation since November 2021. He was previously president of the Swedish Trade Union Confederation (Swedish: Landsorganisationen i Sverige or LO) from 2012 to 2020.

== Background ==
Thorwaldsson grew up in the industrial village of Kosta, part of the Crystal glass manufacturing region in the Småland region. He was the son of a glass blower. Karl-Petter Thorwaldsson joined the Swedish Social Democratic Youth League (Swedish: Sveriges Socialdemokratiska Ungdomsförbund or SSU) and became its chair person from 1990–1995.

== Political career ==
He later became a political advisor at the Prime Minister's Office and head of information at the Social Democrat Party before becoming ombudsman at the trade union IF Metall. Since 2000 he has combined that position with being chairman of the Workers' Educational Association (Swedish: Arbetarnas bildningsförbund, or ABF). IF Metall nominated him as president of LO in 2011 and he was elected on 26 May 2012.

=== Minister of Business, Industry and Innovation ===
He was appointed minister of business, industry and innovation after Magdalena Andersson became prime minister in the wake of Stefan Löfven’s resignation.

On 7 June 2022, Thorwaldsson announced that the Swedish state no longer would be a long term owner of SAS and that they would pour in more equity for the company. He stated: “We have had an ongoing dialogue with the company, which needs a change to be competitive. The government wants to create an opportunity to help SAS further, but we are clear that we will not provide additional capital”.

== Controversies ==
During 2018 and 2019, Thorwaldsson was a driving force in the push to have the social-democratic government restrict the right to strike and limit freedom of association for other unions than the major confederations, arguing that rather than the Swedish model being about avoiding government intervention in conflict of interests between employers and trade unions, the core idea is about the LO, TCO and SACO unions "taking care of the trash" by enforcing a strict union monopoly. This strategy of going to great lengths to keep out independent unions from being able to mobilize members in industries where the three confederations have agreed internally to delineating agreements about organizing rights has been widely criticized both outside and inside the LO movement, by legal experts and grass-roots alike.

In March 2022, Thorwaldsson stood behind the decision to give Beowulf Mining permission to proceed with the plans for the Kallak mine. The project was controversial for its expected consequences on the environment and violations of the Indigenous peoples rights. It faced criticism from advisors of the U.N. Human Rights Council, as well as resistance from local Sami population backed by environmental activists including Greta Thunberg. During the debate preceding the decision Thorwaldsson said in an interview: "I, we in the Social Democratic Party love mines", which became infamous among the activists opposing the project.

Trade union offices
Preceded by Wanja Lundby-Wedin	President of the Swedish Trade Union Confederation; 2014–2020	Succeeded by Susanna Gideonsson
Government offices
Preceded by Ibrahim Baylan	Minister for Business, Industry and Innovation; 2021–2022	Succeeded by Ebba Busch
