= Murder of Karolin Hakim =

2019 murder in Malmö, Sweden

- Native name: Swedish: Mordet på Karolin Hakim; Mordet på Ribersborg
- Date: 26 August 2019
- Location: Malmö, Sweden
- Type: shooting
- Deaths: Karolin Hakim
- Burial: St Paul Norra Kyrkgård, Malmö

The murder of Karolin Hakim took place on the morning of 26 August 2019 in Malmö when Hakim, a Swedish female physician, was shot and fatally wounded in Malmö, Sweden. She died of her wounds at the hospital.

The murder took place near the Ribersborg beach park and Hakim was accompanied by her partner and carrying her infant child when she was killed. Her partner, the veteran criminal Naief Adawi, was identified as the target of the attack. On 28 August, Mikael Damberg the Swedish Minister for Home Affairs visited the crime scene.

A 19-year-old male suspect was arrested 29 August, being the owner of the vehicle the murderer used to escape the crime scene. He was later released but was still under investigation in the case. In September, a 23-year-old male was taken into custody on suspicion on murder, attempted murder and carrying an illegal firearm.

By late September, police still had over 100 witnesses to receive full statements from due to a lack of investigators to record statements.

On 23 October 2019, Swedish Police Authority release camera footage of the main suspect at the crime scene which was published by newspaper Expressen. Public broadcaster Sveriges Television chose not to publish the picture and editor of its Scania division (Swedish: SVT Nyheter Skåne) Göran Eklund motivated his decision with "a publication of this suspect is not enough in the public interest compared to the potential disadvantage of the suspect".

== Victim ==
Hakim had recently finished her education to become a doctor and was mother to a two-month old infant. She was a witness to a previous murder in Malmö.

On 18 September 2019, Hakim was buried at St Pauli Norra Kyrkogård cemetery in Malmö. A ceremony open to the public was held at Luftkastellet and around 150 people showed up to lay flowers at her coffin.

== See also ==
- Gun violence in Sweden
