= Per Westerberg =

Swedish politician (born 1951)

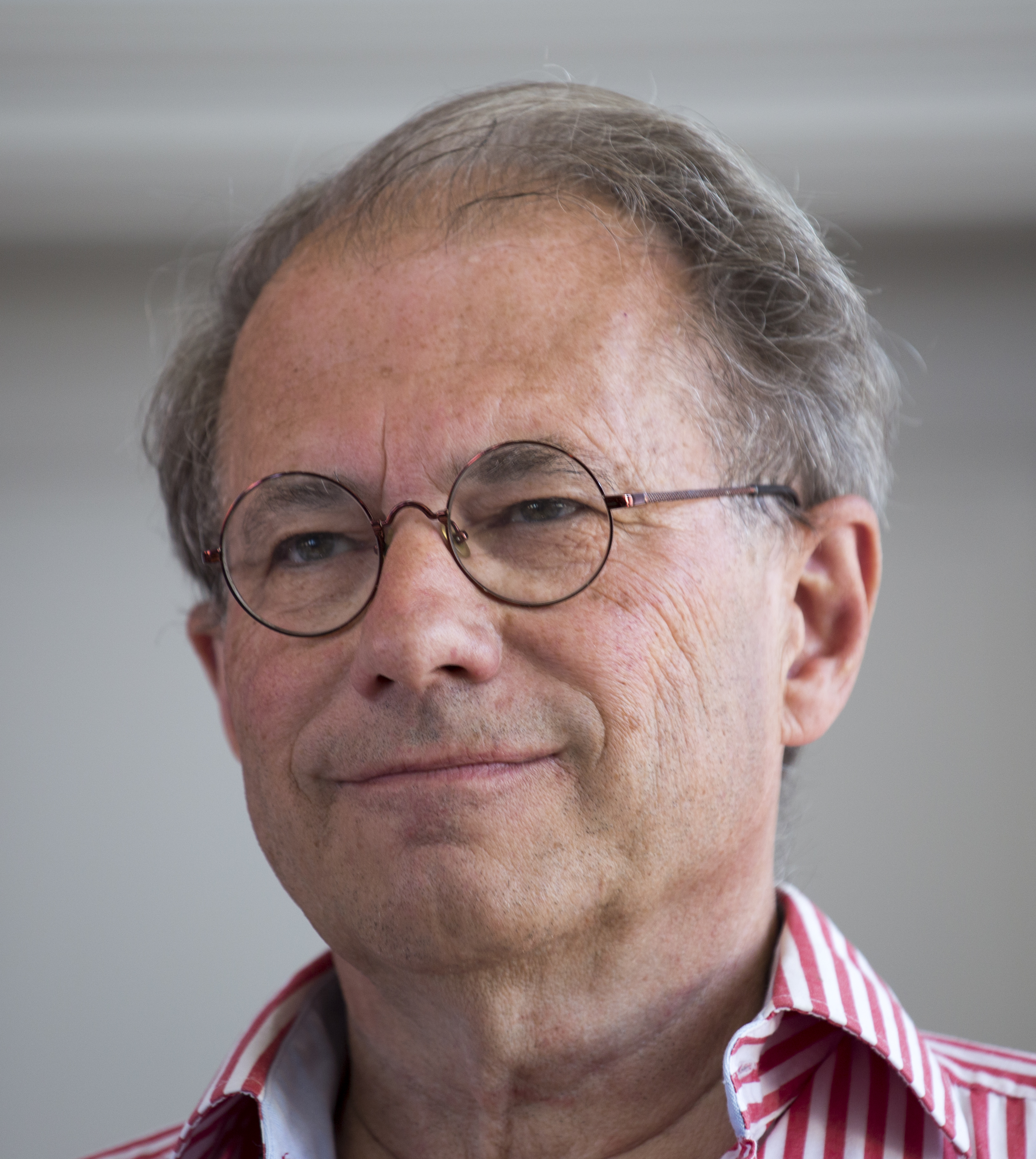
- Per Westerberg in 2015

Speaker of the Riksdag
- In office 2 October 2006 – 29 September 2014
- Monarch: Carl XVI Gustaf
- Preceded by: Björn von Sydow
- Succeeded by: Urban Ahlin

Minister for Industry and Commerce
- In office 4 October 1991 – 7 October 1994
- Prime Minister: Carl Bildt
- Preceded by: Rune Molin
- Succeeded by: Sten Heckscher

Member of the Riksdag for Södermanland County
- In office 1979–2014
- Succeeded by: Erik Bengtzboe

Personal details
- Born: 2 August 1951 (age 75) Nyköping, Sweden
- Party: Moderate
- Education: Stockholm School of Economics
- Occupation: Politician businessman

Per Erik Gunnar Westerberg ([ˈpæːr ˈvɛ̂sːtɛrˌbærj]; born 2 August 1951) is a Swedish politician who was Speaker of the Riksdag from 2006 to 2014. He was a Member of the Riksdag from 1979 to 2014, its most senior member from 2006 to his resignation (see Father of the House). He was Sweden's Minister for Industry and Trade from 1991 to 1994.

== Biography ==
=== Professional career ===
Westerberg was born in Nyköping and graduated from Stockholm School of Economics in 1974. From 1974 to 1977, Westerberg was employed at Saab-Scania in Södertälje. Westerberg was employed at Saab-Scania (the car division) in Nyköping 1979–91, member of the board of AB Karl W. Olsson in 1974, Chairman of Cewe Instrument AB 1984–90 and Elwia AB from 1985. He was director of the Enterprise Agency FFV from 1983, member of the Power Management Committee 1978–82, member of the cooperative inquiry 1980–83, member of the inquiry for the recovery of beverage containers etc. 1982–83, and the ownership investigation from 1985. His family has been running a family business for generations.

=== Political career ===
==== Party political career ====
He was secretary of the Moderate Youth from 1976 to 1978 and political secretary of the Moderate Party from 1978 to 1979. Westerberg became vice chairman of the Moderate Party's county Södermanland in 1977 and was Union Secretary of the Moderate Youth League from 1977 to 78 as well as regional chairman in Nyköping 1979.

==== Member of the Riksdag ====
Per Westerberg is an ordinary Member of the Riksdag since 1979 and was previously a deputy in 1977 and 1978. He was alternate member of the Finance Committee 1979–82, the Industry and Trade Committee 1979–82 (member 1982–85) and the Labour Market Committee from 1985.

Per Westerberg was the longest serving member by his departure from the Riksdag. He also served as Alderman of age after the 2006 general election before he was elected Speaker. During the Speaker election in 2006 was, however, the MP who spent the second longest time in the Riksdag (Social Democrat Margareta Israelsson) acting Alderman because Westerberg in this election was himself disqualified.

He was the wealthiest member of the Riksdag, with a personal fortune exceeding 120 million SEK (around US$18 million as of May 2014).

==== Cabinet minister ====
Westerberg was Minister for Industry and Trade in the Government of Carl Bildt from 1991 to 1994.

==== Speaker of the Riksdag ====
In 2003 he was elected as first of the three Vice Speakers of the Riksdag, and on 2 October 2006 he was elected Speaker of the Riksdag by the new liberal-conservative majority, defeating incumbent Björn von Sydow. On 4 October 2010 he was dramatically re-elected as Speaker of the Riksdag, by a 194–153 vote (with 20 votes in favor being from the Sweden Democrats, whose potential decisiveness to his re-election had been viewed as controversial).

== Personal life ==
Per Westerberg lives in Nyköping with his wife, physician Ylwa Westerberg, with whom he has four children. His brother, Lars Westerberg, was CEO of Autoliv.

== Honours ==
- Bulgaria: Commander of the Order of the Balkan Mountains
- Romania: Grand Cross of the Order of Faithful Service (2008)
- Estonia: Grand Cross of the Order of the Cross of Terra Mariana
- Finland: Grand Cross of the Order of the White Rose
- Greece: Grand Cross of the Order of the Phoenix
- Luxembourg: Knight Grand Officer of the Order of Merit of the Grand Duchy of Luxembourg

Political offices
Preceded by Rune Molin	Minister for Industry and Commerce; 1991–1994	Succeeded by Sten Heckscher
Preceded by Björn von Sydow	Speaker of the Riksdag; 2006–2014	Succeeded by Urban Ahlin
Honorary titles
Preceded by Lennart Nilsson	President by age 2006–2014	Succeeded by Göran Hägglund
Order of precedence
Preceded by Björn von Sydow as former Speaker of the Riksdag	Swedish order of precedence as former Speaker of the Riksdag	Succeeded by Urban Ahlin as former Speaker of the Riksdag
