= Mikael Damberg =

Swedish politician (born 1971)

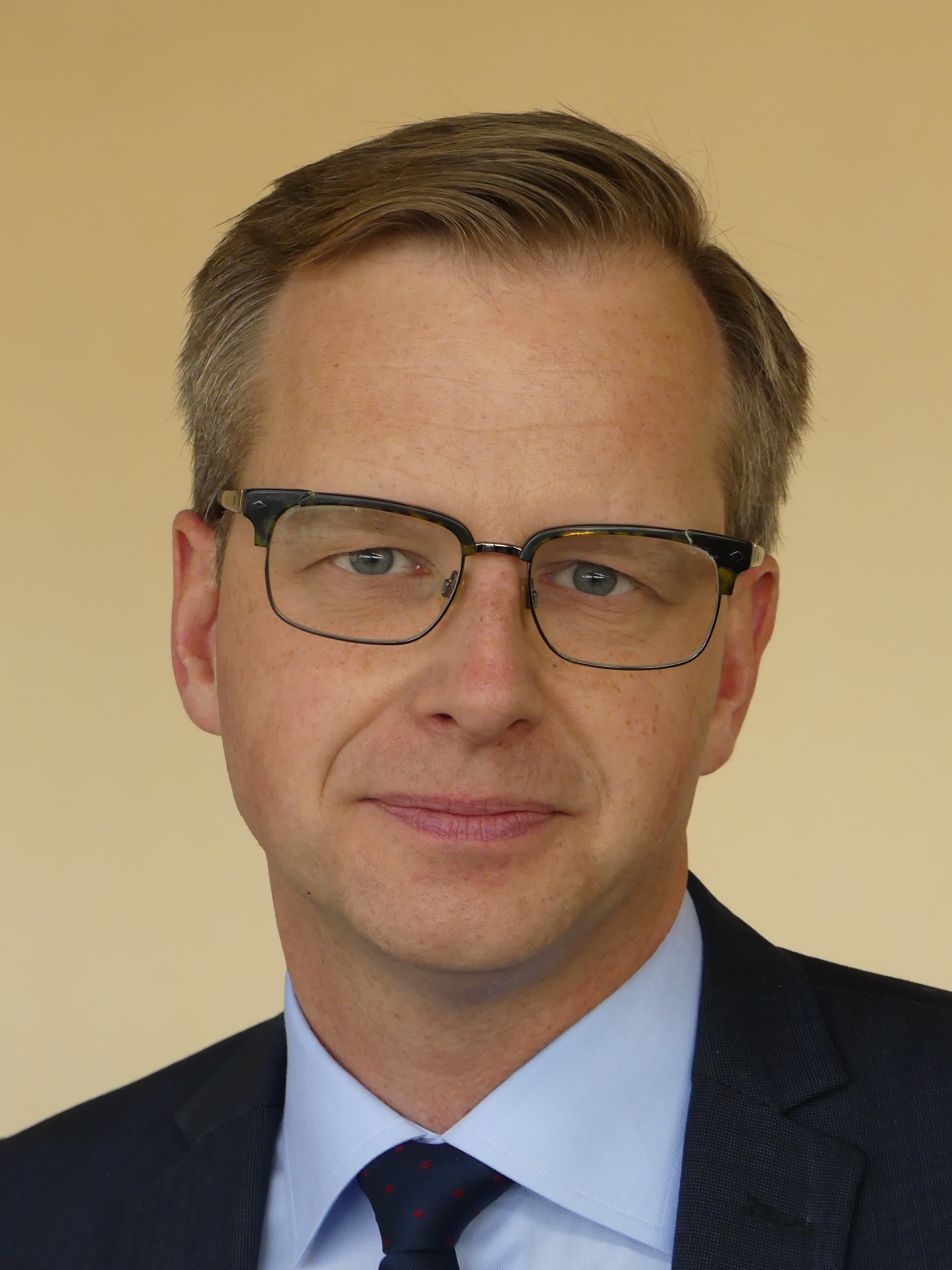
- Damberg in 2016

Minister for Finance
- In office 30 November 2021 – 18 October 2022
- Monarch: Carl XVI Gustaf
- Prime Minister: Magdalena Andersson
- Preceded by: Magdalena Andersson
- Succeeded by: Elisabeth Svantesson

Minister for Home Affairs
- In office 21 January 2019 – 30 November 2021
- Monarch: Carl XVI Gustaf
- Prime Minister: Stefan Löfven
- Preceded by: Morgan Johansson
- Succeeded by: Morgan Johansson

Minister for Enterprise
- In office 3 October 2014 – 21 January 2019
- Monarch: Carl XVI Gustaf
- Prime Minister: Stefan Löfven
- Preceded by: Annie Lööf
- Succeeded by: Ibrahim Baylan

Leader of the Social Democrats in the Swedish Riksdag
- In office 23 February 2012 – 3 October 2014
- Preceded by: Carina Moberg
- Succeeded by: Tomas Eneroth

Member of the Riksdag
- In office 30 September 2002 – 3 October 2014
- Constituency: Stockholm County

Personal details
- Born: Lars Mikael Damberg; 13 October 1971 (age 54) Solna, Sweden
- Party: Social Democratic
- Spouse: Ingela Maria Wewertz
- Education: Stockholm University
- Occupation: Politician

Lars Mikael Damberg ( born 13 October 1971) is a Swedish politician of the Social Democratic Party. He served as Minister for Finance from 2021 to 2022. He previously served as Minister for Enterprise from October 2014 to January 2019 and as minister for home affairs from January 2019 to November 2021.

He has been a Member of the Riksdag since 2002, representing Stockholm County, and was leader of the Social Democrats in the Riksdag from 2012 to 2014.

== Political career and education ==
Damberg was born in Solna, Stockholm County, Sweden. His father is the former Swedish Social Democratic party treasurer Nils-Gösta Damberg and his mother a former district chairwoman of the Finnish Social Democratic Youth Riita-Liisa Damberg. Damberg earned a degree in public administration from Stockholm University in 2000.

== Early career ==
Between 1995 and 1997, Damberg worked as a political assistant to Minister for Defence Thage G. Peterson, and between 1997 and 1999 as political assistant and speechwriter to Prime Minister Göran Persson. Between 1999 and 2003, he was chairman of the Swedish Social Democratic Youth League.

== Political career ==
Damberg joined the Swedish Social Democratic Youth League in the late 1980s and served as a member of the board of the organization between 1993 and 1997. He also served as a member of the municipal council in Solna Municipality between 1991 and 2002. He is chairman of the Social Democratic party district in Stockholm County since 2004.

=== Member of the Swedish Parliament, 2002–present ===
Damberg has served as a member of the Swedish parliament since 2002, representing the Stockholm County constituency. In the parliament he served as deputy chairman of the Committee on Education and as a member of the War Delegation. He has served as a member of the Committee on Education since 2002. He previously served as a deputy member of the Committee on Defence between 2002 and 2006, and as a deputy member of the Committee on Finance between 2006 and 2010.

=== Minister of Enterprise ===
Damberg was appointed Minister for Enterprise on 3 October 2014, serving in the cabinet of Prime Minister Stefan Löfven.

In this capacity, Damberg put forward a 2016 bill stipulating at least 40 percent of board members of listed firms should be women by 2019 at the latest; however, the government later decided to not go ahead with the proposal.

Also in 2016, Damberg approved Vattenfall’s decision to sell its loss-making lignite coal mines and associated power plants in Germany to Czech investor EPH. In 2018, he approved an application from Nord Stream 2 to lay two gas pipelines through its economic zone in the Baltic Sea. In August 2018, Damberg visited the crime scene where Karolin Hakim was killed by a gang member.

Damberg also attended the Bilderberg Meeting in 2015 in Telfs-Buchen, Austria.

=== Minister for Home Affairs ===
Damberg was later appointed minister for home affairs on 21 January 2019 in the second Löfven Cabinet.

Early in his tenure, Damberg coordinated the Swedish government’s efforts seeking support from European allies for a new international tribunal to prosecute Islamic State fighters and military personnel for war crimes perpetrated in Iraq and Syria, modelled on the International Criminal Tribunal for Rwanda and the International Criminal Tribunal for the former Yugoslavia. Among others, he visited counterparts in the United Kingdom and the Netherlands to lobby support for the proposal.

When Dan Eliasson, the head of Swedish Civil Contingencies Agency (MSB), was reported to have holidayed with family on Gran Canaria in violation of guidelines propagated by his own agency against unnecessary travel amid the COVID-19 pandemic in Sweden, Damberg asked for his resignation.

Also during his time in office, Damberg led efforts in 2021 to give police greater powers to access mobile communications data, including conversations using apps like Facebook Messenger and WhatsApp. That same year, he appointed a commission to look at measures including the expansion of secret, preventative surveillance of suspects, currently only allowed in cases related to national security.

=== Minister of Finance ===
Damberg was appointed Minister of Finance on 30 November 2021 after Magdalena Andersson became prime minister.

== Other activities ==
- Asian Infrastructure Investment Bank (AIIB), Ex-Officio Member of the Board of Governors (2021–2022)
- European Bank for Reconstruction and Development (EBRD), Ex-Officio Member of the Board of Governors (2021–2022)
- European Investment Bank (EIB), Ex-Officio Member of the Board of Governors (2021–2022)
- Multilateral Investment Guarantee Agency (MIGA), World Bank Group, Ex-Officio Member of the Board of Governors (2021–2022)
- Nordic Investment Bank (NIB), Ex-Officio Chairwoman of the Board of Governors (2021–2022)
- World Bank, Ex-Officio Member of the Board of Governors (2021–2022)

Party political offices
Preceded by Niklas Nordström	Chairman of the Swedish Social Democratic Youth League; 1999 – 2003	Succeeded by Ardalan Shekarabi
Preceded by Carina Moberg	Leader of the Social Democrats in the Riksdag; 2012 –2014	Succeeded by Tomas Eneroth
Government offices
Preceded by Annie Lööf	Minister for Enterprise; 2014–2019	Succeeded by Ibrahim Baylan
Preceded by Morgan Johansson	Minister for Home Affairs; 2019–2021	Succeeded by Morgan Johansson
Preceded by Magdalena Andersson	Minister for Finance; 2021–2022	Succeeded by Elisabeth Svantesson
