= Rune B. Johansson =

Swedish social democrat politician (1915–1982)

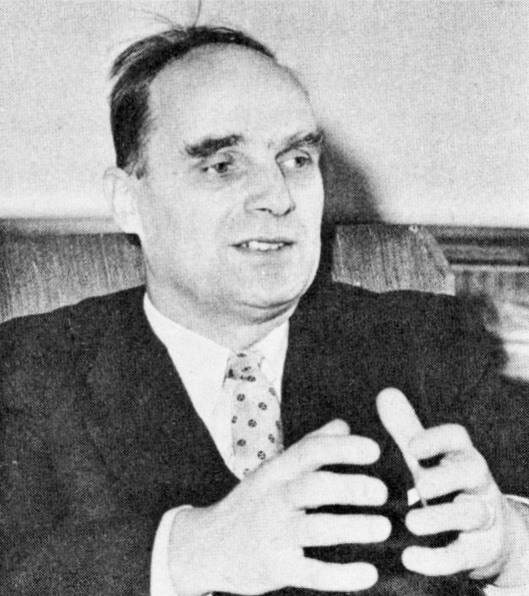

Minister of Industry
- In office 30 June 1971 – 8 October 1976

Minister of the Interior
- In office 31 October 1957 – 24 January 1969
- Prime Minister: Tage Erlander

Member of the Riksdag
- In office 1951–1979

Personal details
- Born: 1915 Växjö, Sweden
- Died: 1982 (aged 66–67) Ljungby, Sweden
- Party: Social Democratic Party

Rune B. Johansson (1915–1982) was a Swedish politician who was a member of the Social Democratic Party. He served as minister of the interior (1957–1962) and minister of industry (1971–1976).

== Biography ==
Johansson was born in Växjö in 1915. He joined the youth movement of the Social Democratic Party and then became part of the county council.

Johansson was appointed minister of state and head of the Ministry of the Interior on 31 October 1957. He served in the post 1962 in the cabinet led by Tage Erlander. Johansson continued to assume the post in the next cabinets, and his tenure ended on 24 January 1969. He also served as the minister of industry from 30 June 1971 to 8 October 1976.

Johansson was the coauthor of a book entitled SABO-företagen i den nya bostadspolitiken which was published in 1967. He died in 1982.
