= Lars Westerberg =

Swedish businessman (born 1948)

Lars Erik Westerberg (born 1948) was the CEO and President of the Swedish automotive safety company Autoliv. He is now the chairman of the board.

His family, which also includes his brother and politician Per Westerberg, has run a family company for generations and the family controls considerable wealth.
