= One Dag Hammarskjöld Plaza =

Office skyscraper in Manhattan, New York

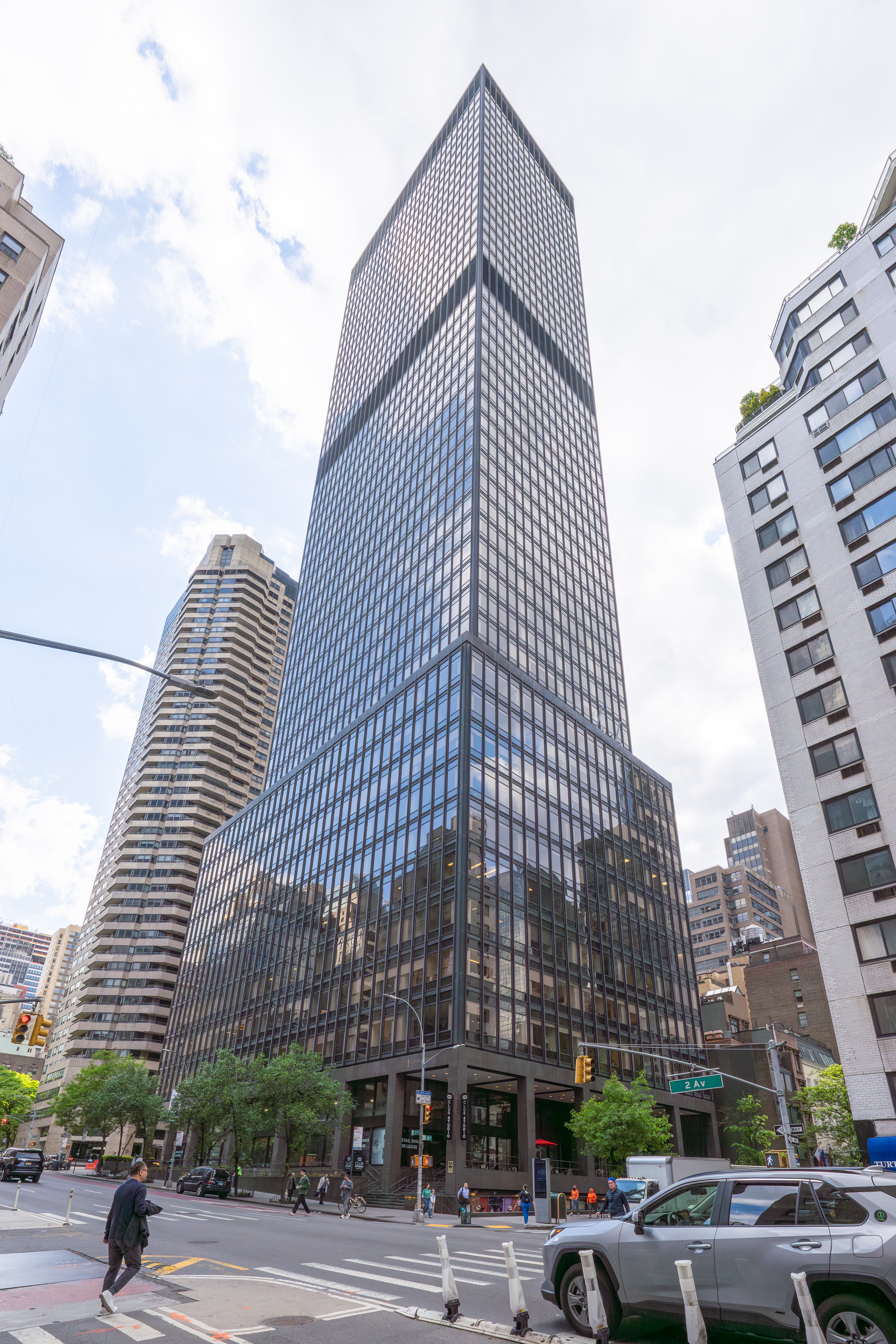
- Interactive map of the One Dag Hammarskjöld Plaza area

General information
- Type: Office
- Architectural style: International
- Location: 885 2nd Avenue, Manhattan, New York City, New York
- Coordinates: 40.753519°N 73.969971°W
- Completed: 1972
- Owner: David Werner

Height
- Roof: 628 ft (191 m)

Technical details
- Floor count: 49
- Floor area: 750,000 sq ft (69,677 m^{2})

Design and construction
- Architecture firm: Emery Roth & Sons; Raymond & Rado
- Developer: Ruben Companies

One Dag Hammarskjöld Plaza is a skyscraper located at 885 Second Avenue in Midtown Manhattan, New York City. It is a 628-foot (191 m) tall skyscraper. It was designed by Emery Roth and developed by Lawrence Ruben. Named for Dag Hammarskjöld, it was completed in 1972 and has 49 floors. It has 750,000 square feet (70,000 m^{2}) of floor area and is the 102nd tallest building in New York.

Its main usage is office space. Denmark, Turkey, the Czech Republic, Canada, France, Italy, the United Kingdom, Spain, Chile, Belgium, Ireland, Austria and Sweden all have their permanent missions to the United Nations located in this building, while Norway and Belgium have consulates there. Communications company Dell Publishing is also a tenant. Rockpoint Group bought the building from the Ruben Companies in 2018 for $600 million. In 2026, David Werner acquired the building for $270 million. Andy Warhol's Factory stood on the site (on 47th Street) from 1963 to 1967.

== See also ==
- List of tallest buildings in New York City
