= Leif Pagrotsky =

Swedish politician, economist and diplomat

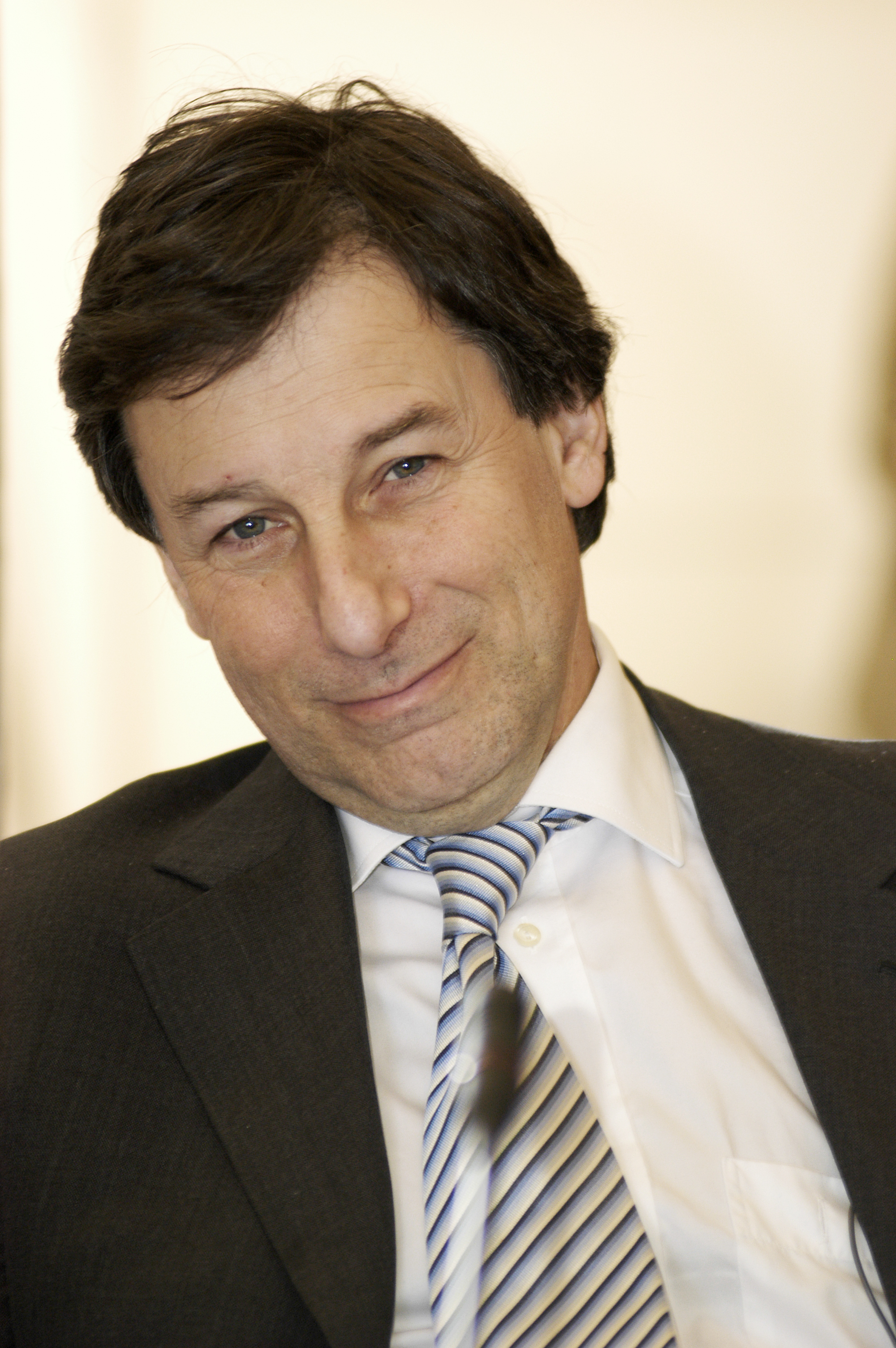
- Pagrotsky in 2005.

Consul General of Sweden in New York City
- In office 27 January 2016 – 1 October 2018
- Preceded by: David E.R. Dangoor
- Succeeded by: Annika Rembe

Minister of Culture
- In office 1 November 2004 – 6 October 2006
- Prime Minister: Göran Persson
- Preceded by: Marita Ulvskog
- Succeeded by: Cecilia Stegö Chilò

Minister for Industry, Employment and Communications
- In office 21 October 2002 – 21 October 2004
- Prime Minister: Göran Persson
- Preceded by: Björn Rosengren
- Succeeded by: Thomas Östros

Member of the Riksdag
- In office 30 September 2002 – 2012
- Constituency: Gothenburg

Personal details
- Born: 20 October 1951 (age 75) Gothenburg, Sweden
- Party: Social Democratic
- Children: Sonja
- Education: University of Gothenburg
- Occupation: Politician, Diplomat

Leif Pagrotsky (born 20 October 1951) is a Swedish politician, economist, and diplomat. He served as Minister of Culture from 2004 to 2006 and Minister for Industry, Employment and Communications from 2002 to 2004 under Prime Minister Göran Persson. After this, he held the position of Consul General of Sweden in New York City from 2016 to 2018.

== Early life and education ==
Leif Pagrotsky grew up in the Björkekärr district of Gothenburg. In his youth, he worked as a docker. Pagrotsky graduated from the University of Gothenburg with a Bachelor of Arts and a Master of Science in Economics.

== Political career ==
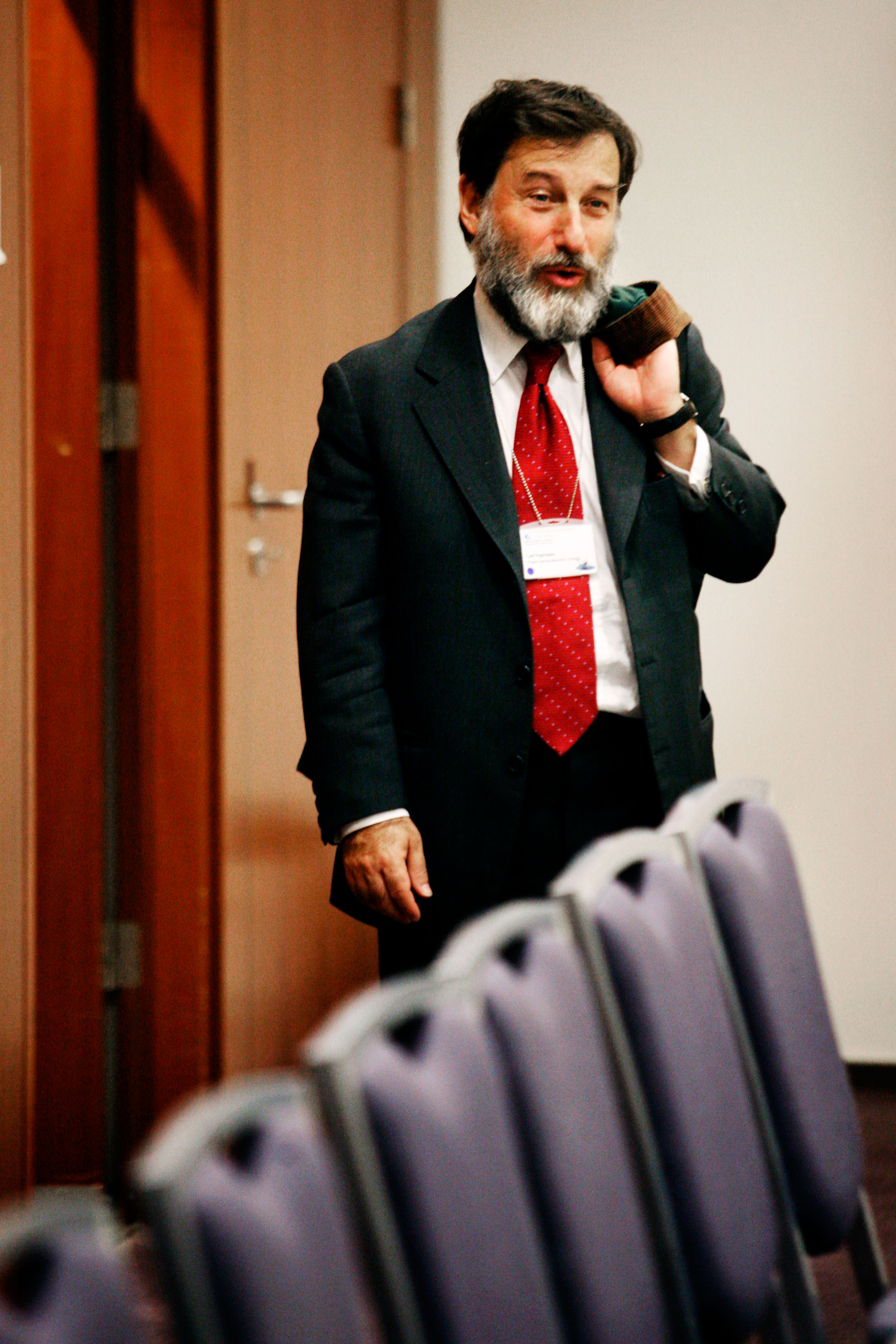
Pagrotsky as minister for culture and education in 2005

Previously, he has held four cabinet-level ministerial positions in the government of Göran Persson from 1996 until 2006, including minister of trade, minister for industry, employment and communications, minister for culture and minister for education. Representing the Swedish Social Democratic Party, Leif Pagrotsky served as a Member of Parliament 2006–2012.

In addition to being minister of trade, industry, employment and communications, culture and education, Leif Pagrotsky has held several high-ranking posts in the Swedish Government Offices, including State Secretary for Financial Affairs in the Ministry of Finance and Vice Chair of the Council of Riksbanken, Sweden's central bank. He has served as Economic Advisor to the Prime Minister, as well as Head of the Division for Financial and Fiscal Affairs in the Ministry of Finance. Prior to the referendum on Sweden joining the European Monetary Union and adopting the Euro, Pagrotsky argued against, contrary to the Prime Minister and the majority of the Social Democratic Party leadership.

Leif Pagrotsky also worked as an economist at Riksbanken and at the Organization for Economic Co-operation and Development (OECD). He was Chairman of the Swedish Trade and Invest Council Business Sweden, as well as Business Region Gothenburg. His financial focus has been on the internal market, globalization, energy policy, and state-owned enterprises.

Leif Pagrotsky has represented Sweden in the European Union (EU), Organisation for Economic Co-operation and Development (OECD), World Trade Organization (WTO), United Nations Conference on Trade and Development (UNCTAD), United Nations Educational, Scientific and Cultural Organization (UNESCO) and ASEM (ASEAN-EU).

In addition to Leif Pagrotsky's finance-related positions he has been an advocate for the arts. He has been a board member of the National Theatre of Norway and the Swedish Performing Rights Society (STIM).

== Diplomatic career ==
From 17 December 2015 to 1 October 2018, Pagrotsky was Consul General of Sweden in New York City. At this position, he focused on the promotion of Sweden in a broad sense, including trade and investment, cultural and consular affairs. In 2018, Pagrotsky announced permanent retirement from politics following a long and fulfilling political career.

== Media ==
Leif Pagrotsky has been featured in both national and international press and media, he has also authored countless articles himself. One of his most recognized appearances was on The Daily Show with Jon Stewart and a segment called “The Stockholm Syndrome.”

== Personal life ==
Pagrotsky is Jewish, and has been faced with threats because of this.

Government offices
Preceded by Björn von Sydow	Minister of Trade; 1997–2002	Succeeded by Thomas Östros
Preceded by Björn Rosengren	Minister for Industry, Employment and Communications; 2002–2004	Succeeded by Thomas Östros
Preceded by Thomas Östros	Minister for Education; 2004–2006	Succeeded by Lars Leijonborg
Preceded by Marita Ulvskog	Minister for Culture; 2004–2006	Succeeded by Cecilia Stegö Chilò
Diplomatic posts
Preceded by David E.R. Dangoor as Honorary consul general	Consul General of Sweden to New York City; 2016–2018	Succeeded by Annika Rembe
