= Thomas Östros =

Swedish economist and politician

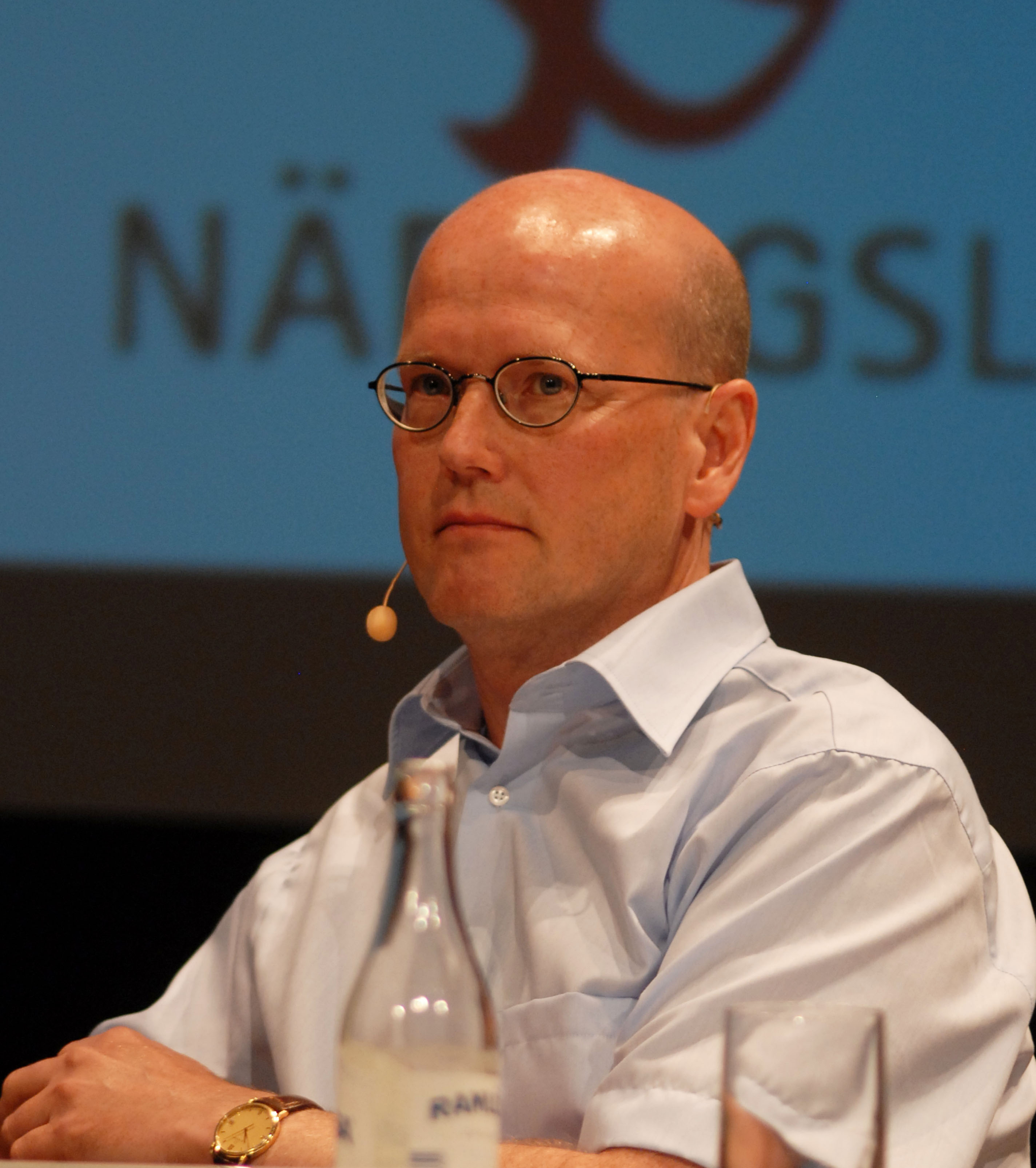

Minister for Enterprise and Energy
- In office 21 October 2004 – 6 October 2006
- Prime Minister: Göran Persson
- Preceded by: Leif Pagrotsky
- Succeeded by: Maud Olofsson

Minister for Education
- In office 4 October 1998 – 21 October 2004
- Prime Minister: Göran Persson
- Preceded by: Carl Tham
- Succeeded by: Leif Pagrotsky

Personal details
- Born: Björn Thomas Waaranperä; 26 January 1965 (age 61) Gällivare, Sweden
- Party: Social Democratic Party
- Children: 3
- Education: Uppsala University

Thomas Östros (born 26 January 1965) is a Swedish economist and Social Democratic politician who has been serving as vice president of the European Investment Bank (EIB) since 2020. Earlier in his career, he held positions as CEO of the Swedish Bankers' Association and Executive Director for Northern Europe at the International Monetary Fund.

== Early life and education ==
Östros was born in Malmberget, as Björn Thomas Waaranperä, the son of an explosives worker and a housewife. His parents changed their Tornedalian family name to Östros when they moved from Norrland to Västerås, because it was easier to pronounce.

Östros has a licentiate degree (a graduate degree in the Swedish university system) in economics from Uppsala University.

== Political career ==
=== Beginnings ===
During his time at university, Östros was an active member of the local branch of Social Democratic Students of Sweden. He also served as a councillor in the Uppsala Municipal Council.

=== Career in national politics ===
In 1994 Östros was elected to the Riksdag as a member of parliament. In 1996, he became the Minister for Taxation at the age of 31, under the Cabinet of Göran Persson, and later served as Minister for Education from 1998 to 2004. In 2004 he switched posts with Leif Pagrotsky and became Minister for Enterprise and Energy, a position he held on to until the Social Democratic defeat at the general elections of 2006. Östros was also the deputy chairman of the Riksdag's committee for Industry and Trade from 2006 to 2008.

In 2008 Östros was appointed economic policy spokesperson for his party, following a leadership dispute between his predecessor Pär Nuder and the newly appointed party chairman Mona Sahlin; a post he was forced to resign from in March 2011, coinciding with the ascension of Håkan Juholt as chairman, a candidate he refused to endorse or publicly support. Östros left the party executive committee at about the same time, and subsequently left the Riksdag in July 2012, having spent a total of 17 years as an MP.

It has often been said that former Prime Minister Göran Persson had a lot of confidence in Östros, and he was mentioned in speculations about possible successors to Persson.

== Professional career ==
Östros was appointed CEO of the trade association Swedish Bankers' Association in 2012, a position he resigned from in 2015, only to later be named executive director for Nordic and Baltic countries at the IMF.

In January 2020, Östros was appointed vice-president of the European Investment Bank (EIB), under the leadership of Werner Hoyer; he succeeded Alexander Stubb. In 2023, the government of Prime Minister Ulf Kristersson nominated him as Sweden's candidate to succeed Hoyer as president of the EIB; however, the position ultimately went to Nadia Calviño.

== Other activities ==
- European Bank for Reconstruction and Development (EBRD), Ex-Officio Member of the Board of Governors (since 2020)
