= 2018–2019 Swedish government formation =

Parliamentary government formation in Sweden

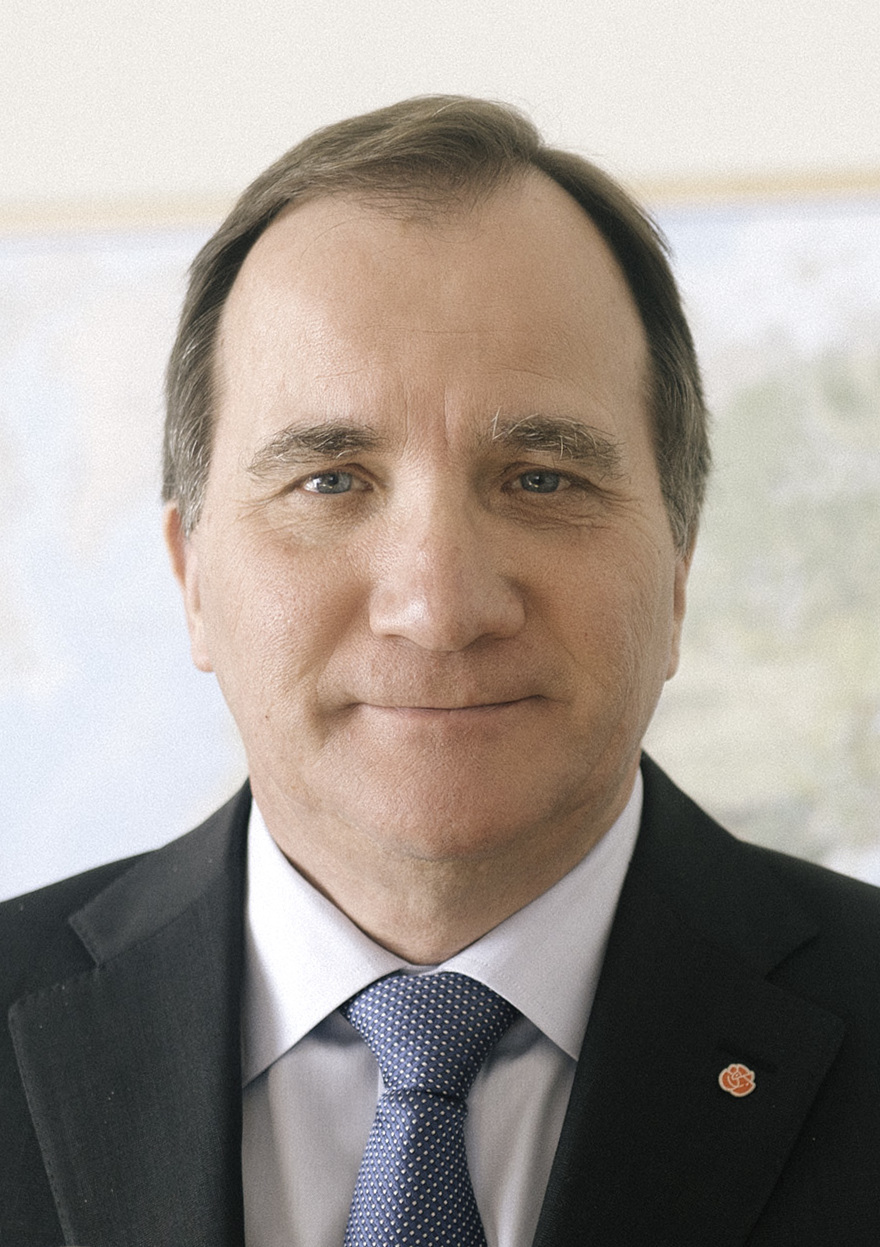
- Re-elected Prime Minister Stefan Löfven
- Date: 9 September 2018–21 January 2019 (134 days)
- Type: Parliamentary government formation
- Cause: 2018 Swedish general election
- Participants: Social Democrats (S); Moderate Party (M); Sweden Democrats (SD); Centre Party (C); Left Party (V); Christian Democrats (KD); Liberals (L); Green Party (MP)
- Outcome: Incumbent Prime Minister Stefan Löfven loses a confidence vote; Approval of M–KD 2019 budget; January Agreement is reached between S, C, L, and MP; Löfven re-elected as prime minister and head of the S–MP Löfven II cabinet tolerated by C, V, and L; Alliance declared dissolved at national level

In the 2018 Swedish general election, no political group or party won an outright majority, resulting in a hung parliament. On 9 September, the centre-left Red-Greens, led by incumbent Prime Minister Stefan Löfven's Social Democrats, emerged as the main political force in the Riksdag, while the centre-right Alliance led by Ulf Kristersson's Moderate Party only got one seat less. The right-wing populist Sweden Democrats, led by Jimmie Åkesson, came third. As a result, protracted negotiations were required before a new government could be formed. Eventually, the January Agreement was reached between the Social Democrats, Centre Party, Liberals, and Green Party. On 18 January 2019, Löfven was re-elected as prime minister and on 21 January, he formed the Social Democratic and Green Löfven II cabinet tolerated by the Centre Party, Left Party, and Liberals.

== Constitutional context ==
The Swedish constitution creates a system known as "negative parliamentarianism", wherein "a prime ministerial candidate does not need to have the support of a majority, they only need to show that they do not have a majority of parliament against them." In other words, the vote of confidence in Sweden is in practice a vote of no confidence, wherein the burden of proof is on the opposition. Political parties can symbolically "abstain" from the vote, which in practice acts as a yes vote and shows that the party tolerates, or tacitly approves, a government formation without the associated baggage that comes with outright support. Thus, the status quo is to seek a government agreement that is tolerable by a majority of the parties, rather than a polarizing agreement that is liked by one side and hated by the other.

== Parliamentary situation ==
=== Distribution of seats in the Riksdag ===
The table below lists parties' 2018 representation in the Riksdag.

Name		Leader	Seats
S	Social Democrats; Socialdemokraterna	Stefan Löfven	100
M	Moderate Party; Moderaterna	Ulf Kristersson	70
SD	Sweden Democrats; Sverigedemokraterna	Jimmie Åkesson	62
C	Centre Party; Centerpartiet	Annie Lööf	31
V	Left Party; Vänsterpartiet	Jonas Sjöstedt	28
KD	Christian Democrats; Kristdemokraterna	Ebba Busch Thor	22
L	Liberals; Liberalerna	Jan Björklund	20
MP	Green Party; Miljöpartiet	Isabella Lövin; Gustav Fridolin	16

=== Groups ===
Group	Parties	Seats
Red-Greens (left-wing to centre-left)	S+V+MP	144
Alliance (centre-right)	M+C+L+KD	143
Conservative part of the Alliance (centre-right to right-wing)	M+KD	92
Strictly anti-SD and formerly anti-V liberal part of the Alliance (centre to centre-right)	C+L	51
Sweden Democrats (right-wing populist)	SD	62
Incumbent caretaker Löfven I cabinet (centre-left)	S+MP	116
January Agreement	S+C+L+MP	167
Against the January Agreement (with V abstaining)	M+SD+KD	154

Under the principle of negative parliamentarism, a government needs at least 175 members of parliament to not vote against it (such members should either vote 'yes' or abstain).

==== Groups during actual voting ====
Group	Parties	Seats
In the beginning confidence in a prime minister from S	S+V+MP	144
Confidence in a prime minister from M	M+SD+KD	154
In the end not against a prime minister from S	S+C+V+L+MP	195

=== Potential governments ===
Potential governments	Seats
Total seats in the Riksdag	349
Governments with a majority (175 or more seats)
S–M–C–KD–L–MP	259
S–M–C–KD–L	243
Governments without a majority (174 or fewer seats)
S–C–L–MP	167
M–C–KD–L–MP	159
M–C–KD–L	143
S–MP	116
M–KD	92
C–L	51

With no political group or party having an outright majority, as well as a tangled web of conflicting interests among the parties, speculations were made around a number of possible compromises:

- S–M–C–KD–L–MP (national unity or grand coalition government): Löfven (S), Kristersson (M), and Lööf (C) were all mentioned as potential leaders, but there was disagreement about who would be prime minister, and Kristersson rejected the idea of Löfven serving another term as prime minister. C mentioned this as an alternative preferred government, claiming that the popularity of SD was a national crisis which could be handled together by all other parties (except V). Regardless of leader, S, M, and V did not support this government alternative, and neither did SD unless given influence. S and M did not want to be in the same government and there cannot be two prime ministers. Also, M rejected the proposition of Löfven remaining as prime minister, despite S remaining the largest party.
  - Alternatively S–M–C–KD–L: Also one of C's preferred governments.
- S–C–L–MP with external support from V: This would disrupt the Alliance, which, while fragile, was still considered preferable to C and L than relying on V.
- M–C–KD–L–MP: One of C's preferred governments. Although this solution was in place in the Stockholm city council, such a government did not have a majority on the national level and needed support from other parties. MP did not accept this government alternative.
- M–C–KD–L with external support from S or SD: The first option was one of C's preferred governments. S however proved unwilling to work towards this setup, believing that they should lead a government they were part of, as they had the most seats of any party. C and L ruled out participating in any government that depended on SD.
- S–MP with external support from V: This was the government model the previous legislature term. After the election, this government was voted out of confidence, and neither the Alliance nor SD were willing to allow this government to return. In the end, this became the government. This was after that C and L decided to allow it despite their previous Alliance leaning.
- M–KD with external support from SD, C, and L: SD stated that they would only back a government which they had political sway in. In response to this, C and L stated that they would break the Alliance if M attempted a government needing support from SD, making this setup politically unfeasible.
- C–L with external support from other parties: Lööf (C) said that this government would not be supported by parliament.

== Formation process ==
=== Speaker election ===
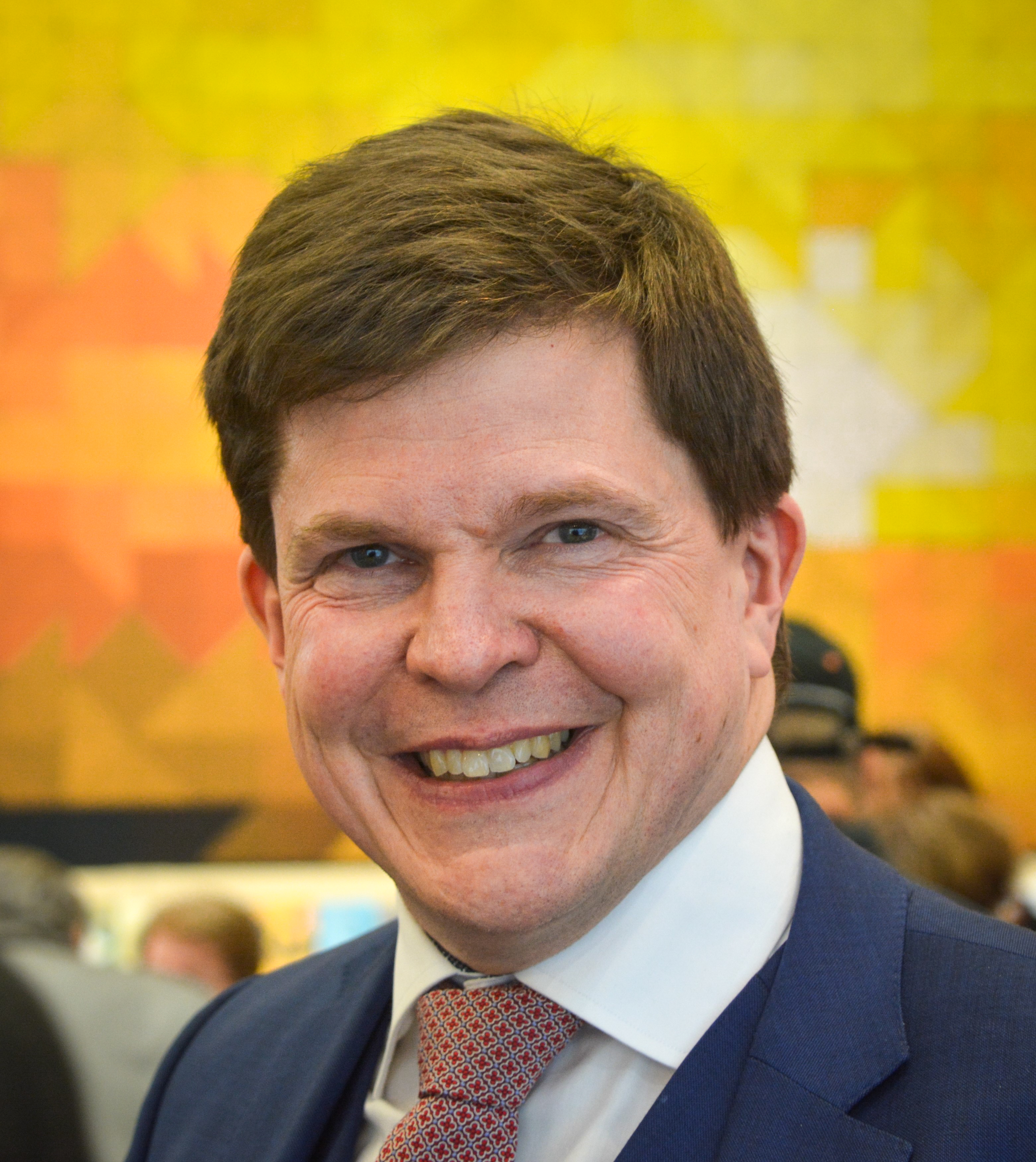
Andreas Norlén.

Andreas Norlén was elected new Speaker of the Riksdag on 24 September 2018, following the first sitting of the Riksdag since the elections with 203 to 145 votes against Åsa Lindestam, who became First Deputy Speaker.

Ballot →	24 September 2018
Required majority →	175 (including abstentions) out of 349
Andreas Norlén: • M; • SD; • C; • KD; • L	203 / 349
Åsa Lindestam: • S; • V; • MP; • N/A	145 / 349
Abstentions: • None	0 / 349
Absentees: • N/A	1 / 349
Result →	Andreas Norlén elected

=== Ousting of Löfven ===
Prime Minister Stefan Löfven lost the motion of no confidence against him and his cabinet on 25 September 2018, with 142 members of parliament voting to retain Löfven's cabinet and 204 voting against. Löfven stated in a subsequent press conference that he would not step down as Social Democratic party leader and that he was willing to partake in talks regarding the formation of a new government, but insisted that it was ultimately up to the Speaker of the Riksdag. Löfven also stated that he found it completely unbelievable that the Alliance could ever form a government if they keep their promise of not co-operating with the Sweden Democrats.

Investiture; Stefan Löfven (Social Democratic)
Ballot →	25 September 2018
Required majority →	175 (including abstentions) out of 349
Yes: • S; • V; • MP	142 / 349
No: • M; • SD; • C; • KD; • L	204 / 349
Abstentions: • None	0 / 349
Absentees: • N/A	3 / 349
Result →	No

==== Aftermath ====
Two days later party negotiations for forming a new government commenced. and on 2 October the Speaker of the Riksdag, Andreas Norlén, announced that he had tasked Moderate Party leader Ulf Kristersson with forming a government.

On 14 October, Ulf Kristersson held a press conference, stating that he had notified the Speaker of the Riksdag that he is giving up his attempt at forming a government. Kristersson maintained that he still has the intention of becoming prime minister and leading a government consisting of "the entire Alliance, solely the Moderates or those Alliance parties that would be willing to enter into an Alliance government led by myself." He informed the Speaker of the Riksdag that "there is currently no basis for any of these options at this time". The reason for the failure was that the Alliance had fewer seats than the red-greens, so the Sweden Democrats (or the Social Democrats) had to support government propositions or they would fail: such need for Sweden Democrat support was not tolerated by the Centre Party and Liberals. They proposed a government including the Social Democrats, which the Moderates rule out.

Stefan Löfven was tasked with forming a government on 15 October 2018, giving him two weeks to construct a stable government coalition. On 29 October, Löfven announced that he too had failed to create a stable government. Norlén then took over the process of government formation directly, though he did not announce a deadline. As the budget had to be renewed by 15 November, Swedish Government's finance ministry had been working on a "politically neutral" emergency bill that would avert a second budget crisis if the government is not formed by then.

=== First Riksdag vote ===
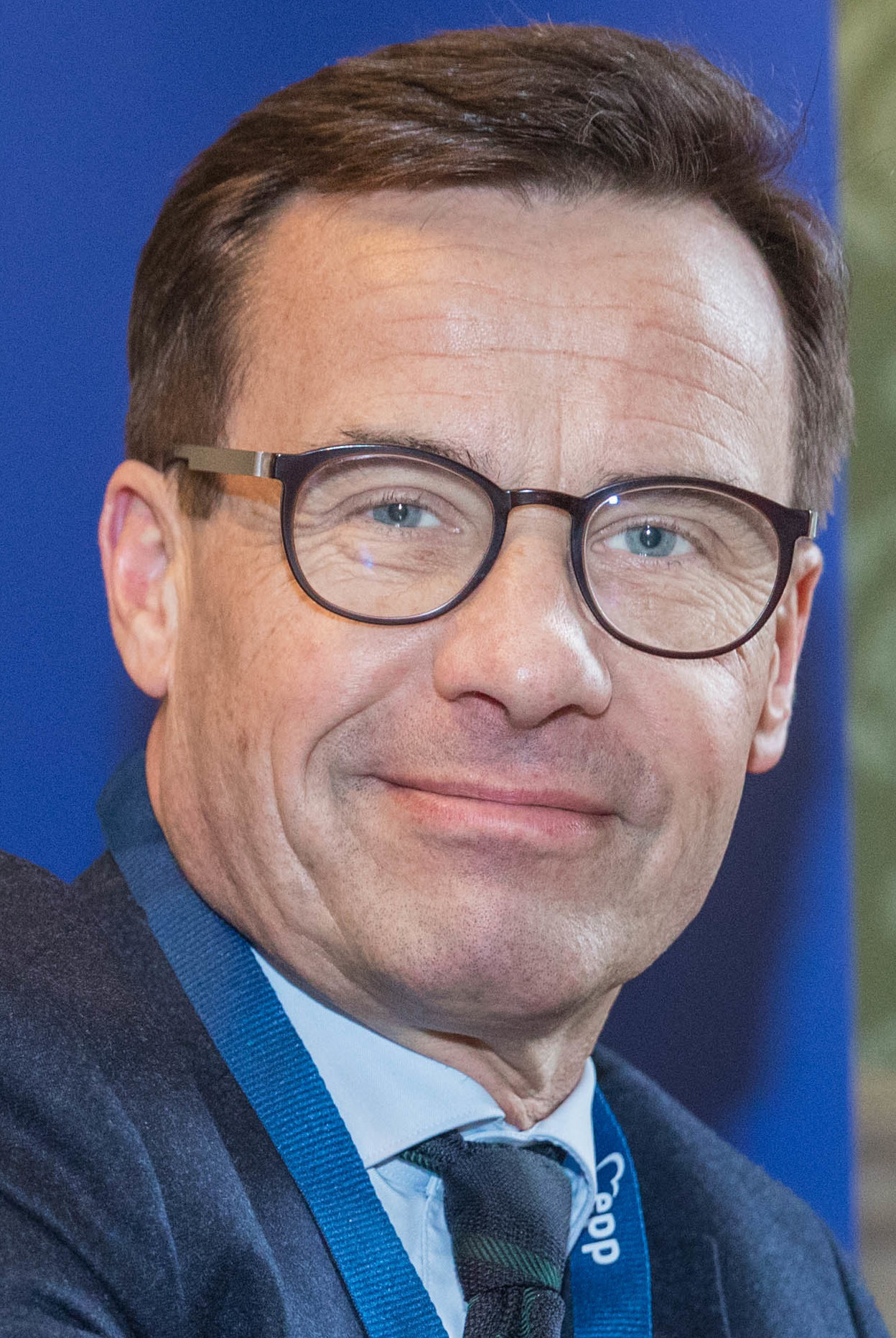
Ulf Kristersson.

On 5 November, Speaker Norlén nominated Moderate leader Ulf Kristersson to lead the government. A nomination, in this case, means that the Riksdag will have a confidence vote, rather than merely continuing talks. Centre leader Annie Lööf was critical of the decision, as she had expected to become the third person tasked with forming a stable government coalition. Lööf was also critical of the Moderates as well as the Christian Democrats, accusing them of taking her opportunity of forming a government away (the Speaker was a Moderate), thus disrupting an already fragile Alliance. The vote was set to take place during the week of 12 November, before the budget debate on 15 November.

On 14 November, Kristersson's proposed minority government of Moderates + Christian Democrats supported by Sweden Democrats failed the Riksdag confidence vote 195–154. The Centre Party and Liberals broke their alliance, as they refused to accept a government that relied on the Sweden Democrats. The vote was marked the first time a candidate for prime minister was rejected by the Riksdag since the abolition of the bicameral legislature in 1971. The Swedish constitution stipulates that the Riksdag will have four chances to pass a confidence vote, after which a new election will be mandatory.

Investiture; Ulf Kristersson (Moderate Party)
Ballot →	14 November 2018
Required majority →	175 (including abstentions) out of 349
Yes: • M (70); • SD (62); • KD (22)	154 / 349
No: • S (100); • C (31); • V (28); • L (20); • MP (16)	195 / 349
Abstentions: • None	0 / 349
Absentees: • None	0 / 349
Result →	No

=== Second Riksdag vote and budget vote ===
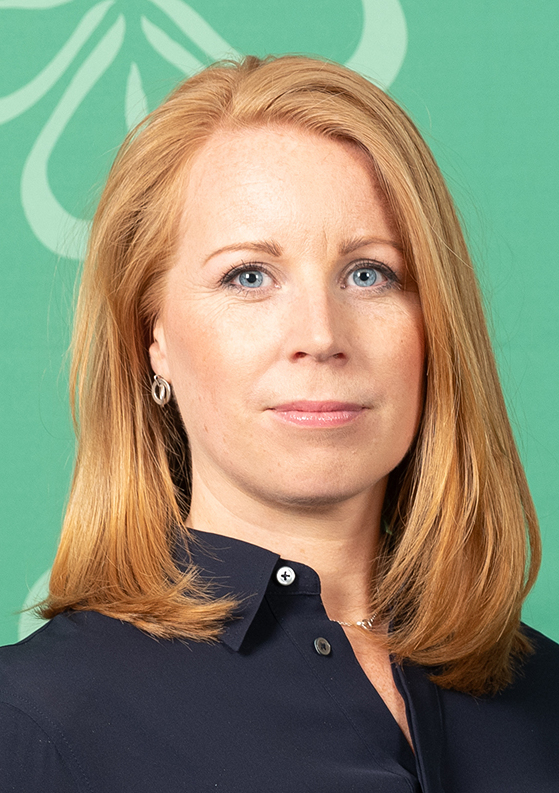
Annie Lööf.

On 15 November, Speaker Norlén tasked Lööf (C) with forming a government, and gave her a one-week extendable deadline. Norlén did not announce a date for a second Riksdag vote, stating only that there would be "one or more votes this autumn." Lööf stated that she wanted to construct a centrist government, and that she wanted the centre-right (M, KD, and L) and the centre-left (S and MP) to agree to negotiate with her about the possibility of forming a new government, excluding the parties that are left-wing (V) and right-wing populist (SD).

Lööf announced on 22 November that she would concede her attempt to form a government, blaming the Moderates and Social Democrats for being unwilling to compromise. The next day, Norlén nominated Löfven to be the prime minister, without a formally-set date for the vote. He also set the budget vote to occur on 12 December. The Centre Party stated that they may support Löfven (and thus give the red-greens 31 seats, exactly enough for a majority) if Löfven's cabinet agrees to some economic compromises. Soon after, the Liberal leader Jan Björklund made a similar statement, although the party was internally divided on the matter.

On 12 December, Norlén formally nominated Löfven. As the Centre Party and Liberals had stated earlier in the week that they were not satisfied with Löfven's negotiations, the outcome of the vote remained uncertain. On the same day, the provisional budget was submitted by the caretaker government, but was defeated by an alternative budget created by the Moderates and Christian Democrats, as the Sweden Democrats supported it, and the Centre Party and Liberals decided to abstain from the final vote. On 14 December, Löfven lost the confidence vote.

Budget; Social Democrats + Greens (caretaker)
Ballot →	12 December 2018
Required majority →	175 (including abstentions) out of 349
Yes: • S (100); • V (28); • MP (16)	144 / 349
No: • M (70); • SD (62); • C (31); • KD (22); • L (20)	205 / 349
Abstentions: • None	0 / 349
Absentees: • None	0 / 349
Result →	No

Budget; Moderates + Christian Democrats
Ballot →	12 December 2018
Required majority →	175 (including abstentions) out of 349
Yes: • M (70); • SD (62); • KD (22)	154 / 349
No: • S (100); • V (28); • MP (16)	144 / 349
Abstentions: • C (31); • L (20)	51 / 349
Absentees: • None	0 / 349
Result →	Yes

Investiture; Stefan Löfven (Social Democratic)
Ballot →	14 December 2018
Required majority →	175 (including abstentions) out of 349
Yes: • S (100); • MP (16)	116 / 349
No: • M; • SD; • C; • KD; • L	200 / 349
Abstentions: • V (28)	28 / 349
Absentees: • SD (min. 1); • N/A	5 / 349
Result →	No

=== Third Riksdag vote and re-election of Löfven ===
Speaker Norlén stated after the vote that he would restart negotiations between the parties, while at the same time preparing for the possibility of a snap election. Norlén then created a finalized timeline for forming a government, and urged Kristersson and Löfven to find a compromise. Without nominating a new candidate, he set the next vote for a prime minister on 16 January, and a final vote on 23 January if the first vote fails. If neither vote succeeded, a snap election would be called immediately, and would likely take place on 7 April according to the Swedish Election Authority.

On 11 January 2019, it was reported that the Social Democrats, Greens, Centre and Liberals had reached a deal to support Löfven as prime minister in order to end the deadlock. These cooperating parties have only 167 members of Riksdag, and need support from one more party. It was assumed that the Left Party would back a Social Democratic coalition by default, but the agreement text specifically excluded the Left Party from participation on matters covered by the agreement, and left the party out of future coalition negotiations. The Left Party criticized being expected to back a government which would leave them without a voice, and on 14 January, Left Party leader Jonas Sjöstedt stated that they would not back the agreement as it stood, calling for further negotiations. Consequently, the speaker deferred the third prime ministerial vote scheduled for 16 January to instead take place on 18 January to allow Löfven and Sjöstedt to reach their own compromise.

On 16 January, Sjöstedt told reporters his party would abstain from voting against Löfven but threatened to initiate a no-confidence vote against him in the future if he supported policies that threaten worker's rights or if he put forward proposals that further deregulate the rental market. That same day, the Speaker again formally nominated Löfven as a prime ministerial candidate, scheduling a vote in the Riksdag for 18 January. The speaker of the Riksdag, Norlén, declared he would nominate Ulf Kristersson for prime minister had the investiture vote failed. This forced the Centre Party and the Left Party to choose between Löfven, Kristersson (with SD support), and a snap election. The Left Party did not want to risk Kristersson becoming the prime minister, and the Centre and Liberal parties did not want a snap election, which, according to polls, could send the Liberals out of the Riksdag and give M+KD+SD a majority.

During the vote, Löfven was elected prime minister with 115 Riksdag members voting for him and 77 members abstaining (total of 192 votes). Due to the low number of yes votes Löfven received, he had the third weakest government since the end of World War II at the time of his election.

Investiture; Stefan Löfven (Social Democratic Party)
Ballot →	18 January 2019
Required majority →	175 (including abstentions) out of 349
Yes: • S (99); • MP (16)	115 / 349
Abstentions: • C (30); • V (27); • L (20)	77 / 349
Yes + Abstentions: • Yes (115); • Abstentions (77)	192 / 349
No: • M (69); • SD (61); • KD (22); • C (1)	153 / 349
Absentees: • S (1); • M (1); • SD (1); • V (1)	4 / 349
Result →	Yes

==== Aftermath ====
On 21 January 2019, Löfven unveiled the members of his cabinet and presented his statement of government (regeringsförklaring) to parliament. As was the case with his first cabinet, the second one consisted of Social Democrats and Greens. It included the following ministers:

- Prime Minister's Office:
  - Stefan Löfven (S) – Prime Minister of Sweden
  - Hans Dahlgren (S) – EU Minister
- Ministry of Justice:
  - Morgan Johansson (S) – Justice Minister
  - Mikael Damberg (S) – Interior Minister
- Foreign Ministry:
  - Margot Wallström (S) – Foreign Minister
  - Peter Eriksson (MP) – Minister for Development Cooperation
  - Ann Linde (S) – Minister of Foreign Trade and Minister for Nordic Cooperation
- Ministry of Labor:
  - Ylva Johansson (S) – Labour Minister
  - Åsa Lindhagen (MP) – Gender Equality Minister
- Ministry of Infrastructure (new department):
  - Tomas Eneroth (S) – Infrastructure Minister
  - Anders Ygeman (S) – Energy and Digitalisation Minister (new position)
- Ministry of Finance:
  - Magdalena Andersson (S) – Finance Minister
  - Per Bolund (MP) – Housing Minister and Deputy Minister for Finance
  - Ardalan Shekarabi (S) – Consumer Affairs Minister
- Ministry of Defense:
  - Peter Hultqvist (S) – Defence Minister
- Ministry of Culture:
  - Amanda Lind (MP) – Culture Minister
- Ministry of the Environment:
  - Isabella Lövin (MP) – Deputy Prime Minister and Environment Minister
- Ministry of Industry:
  - Ibrahim Baylan (S) – Industry Minister
  - Jennie Nilsson (S) – Rural Affairs Minister
- Ministry of Health:
  - Lena Hallengren (S) – Minister of Health and Social Affairs
  - Annika Strandhäll (S) – Social Security Minister
- Ministry of Education:
  - Anna Ekström (S) – Education Minister
  - Matilda Ernkrans (S) – Minister for Higher Education and Research

== See also ==
- 2021 Swedish government crisis
- 2021 Swedish government formation
- 2026 Swedish government formation
