= 2010 Swedish general election =

- 19 September 2010

All 349 seats to the Riksdag 175 seats are needed for a majority
- Registered: 7,123,651
- Turnout: 84.6% (▲2.7 pp)
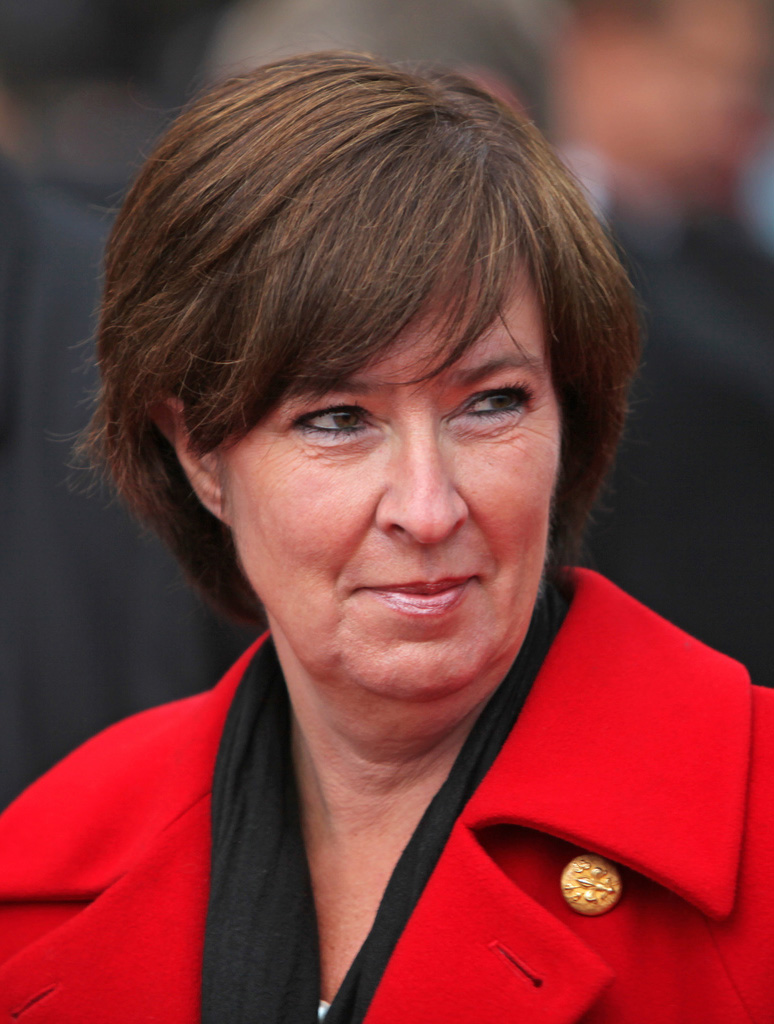

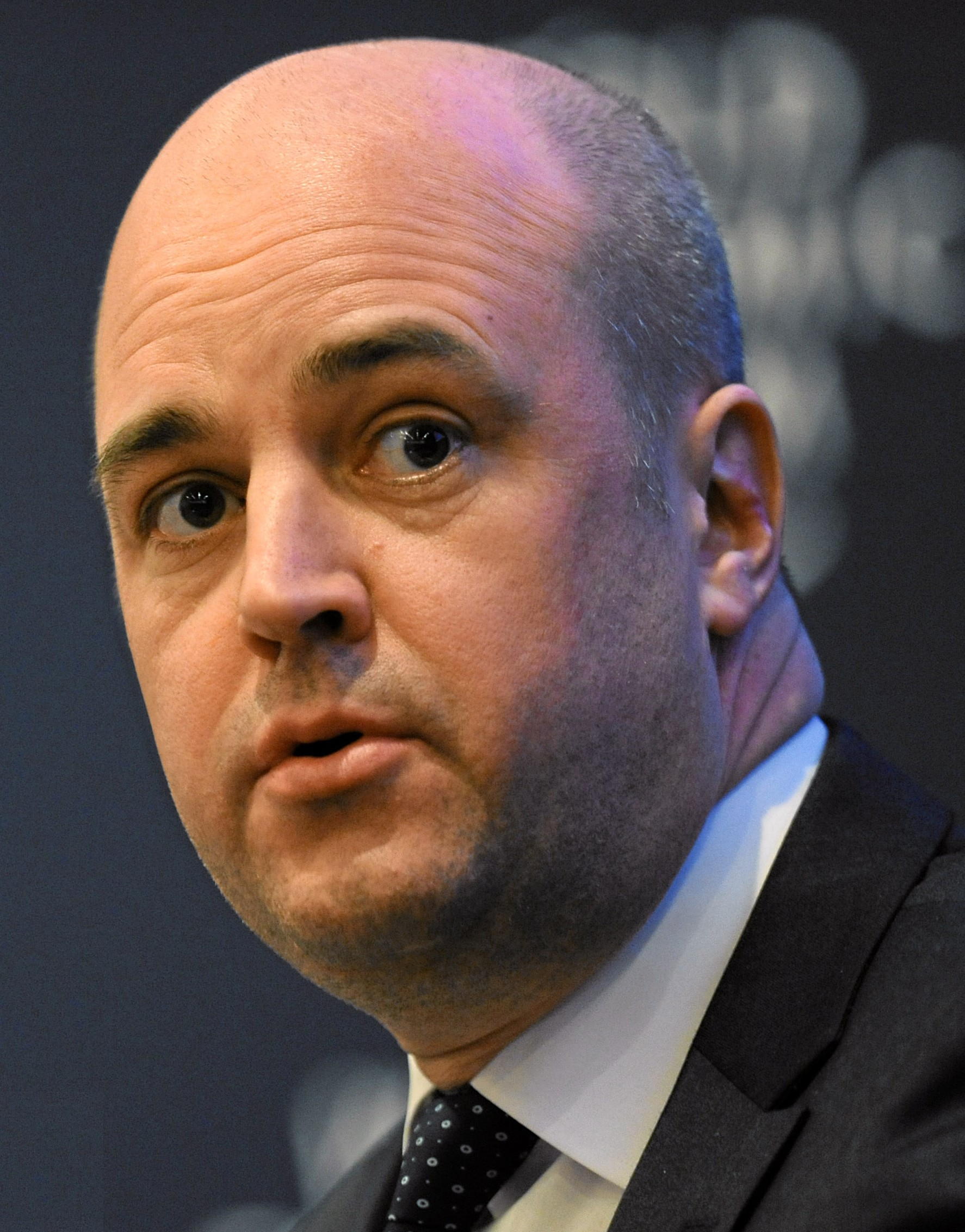

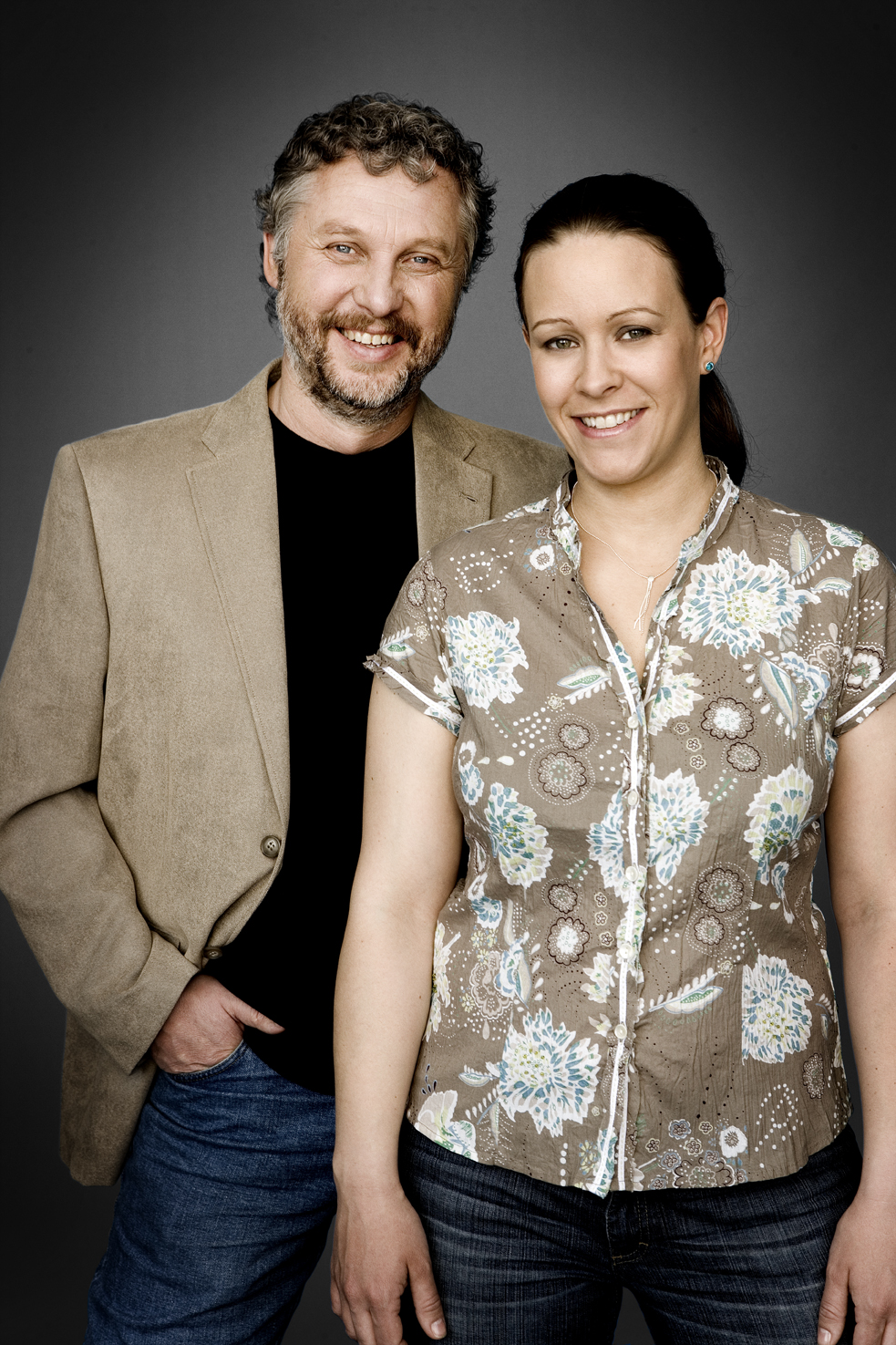

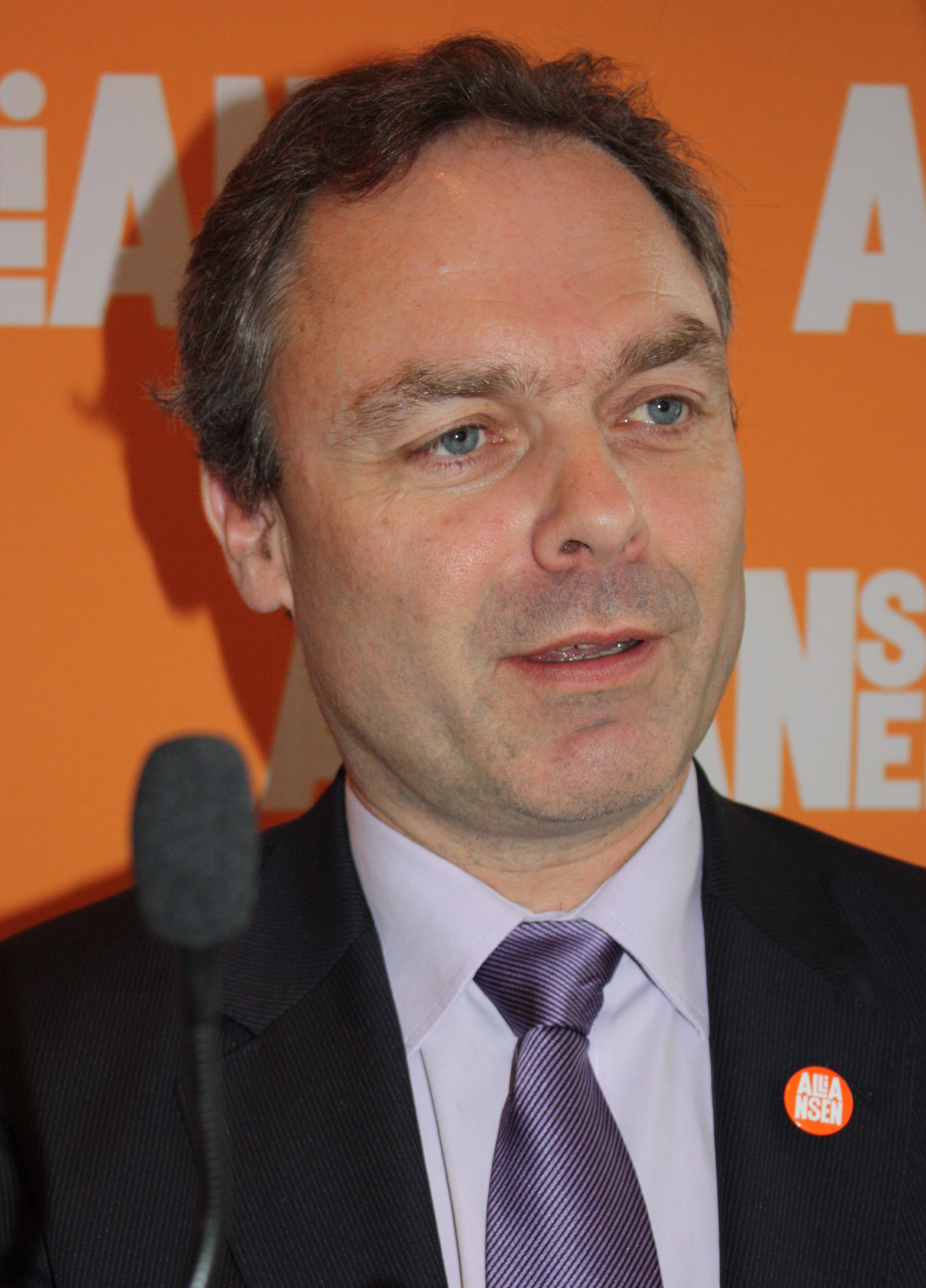

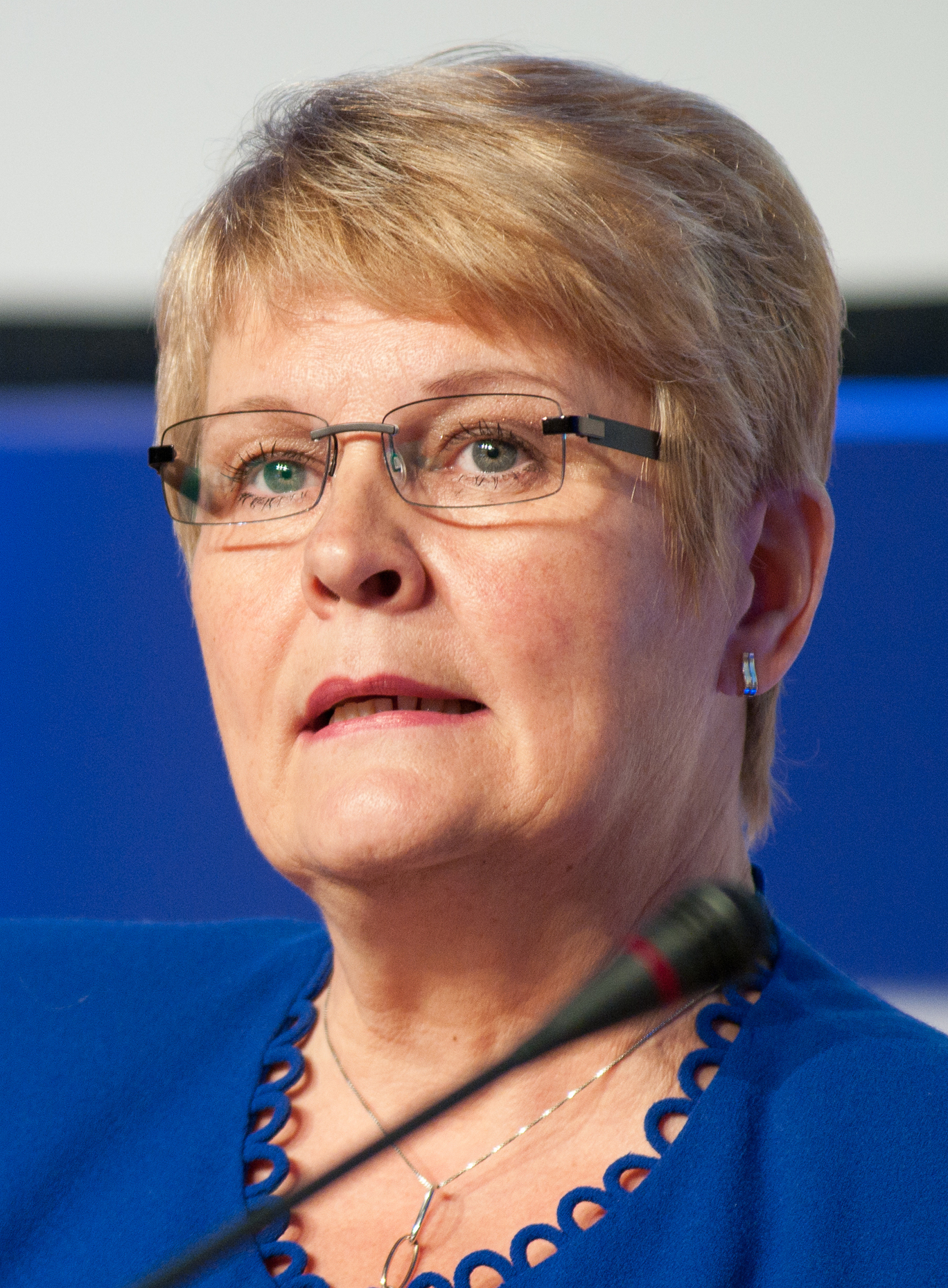

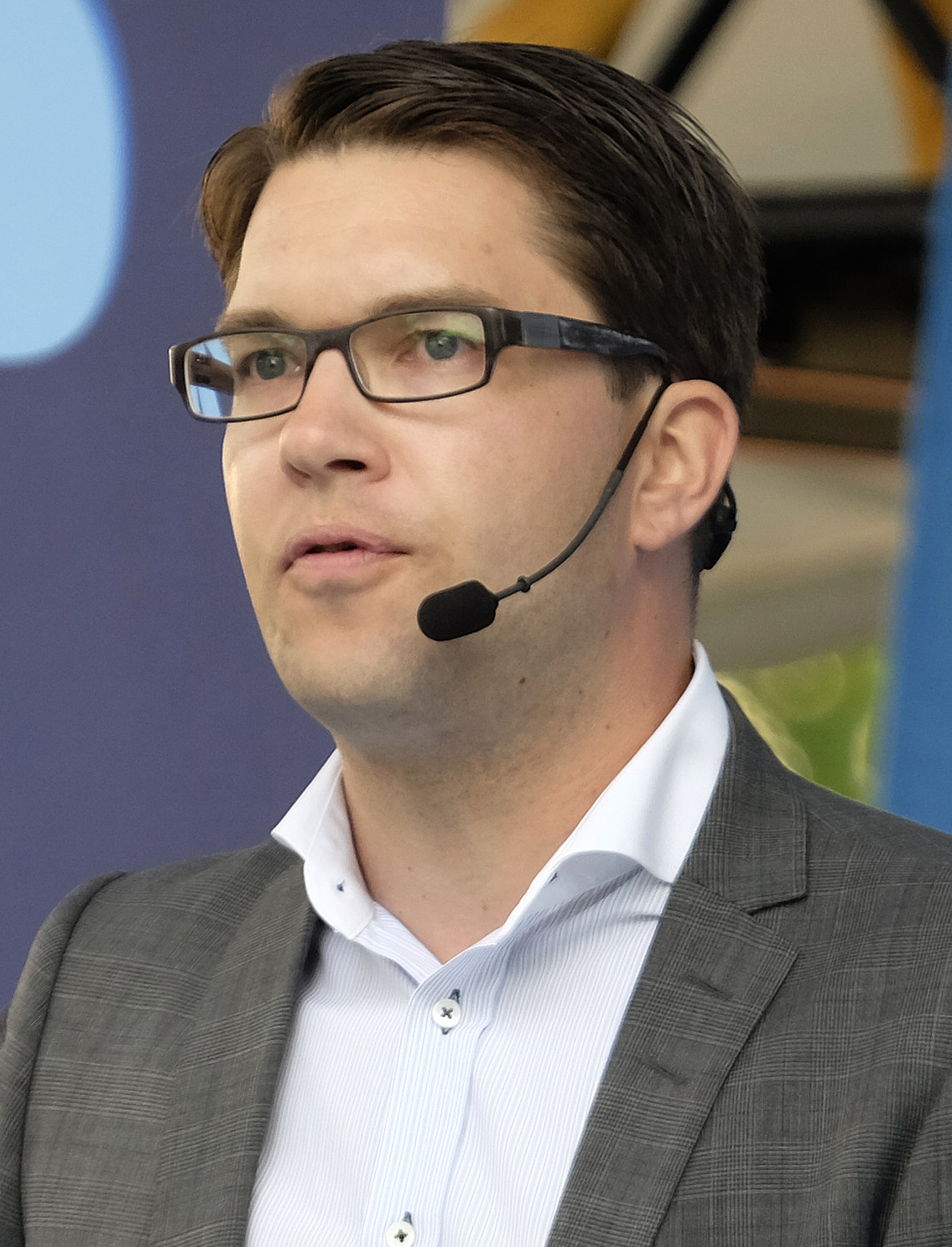

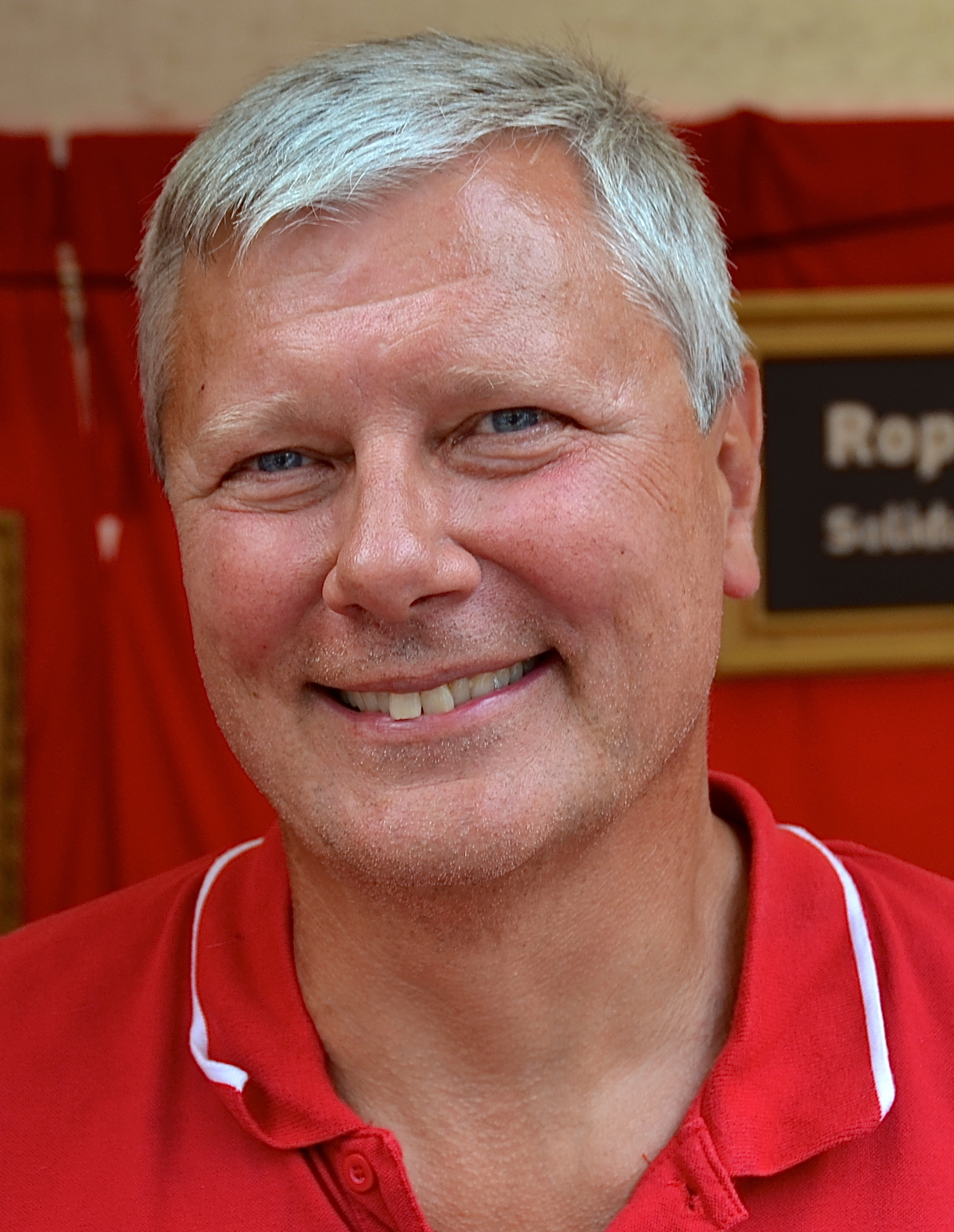

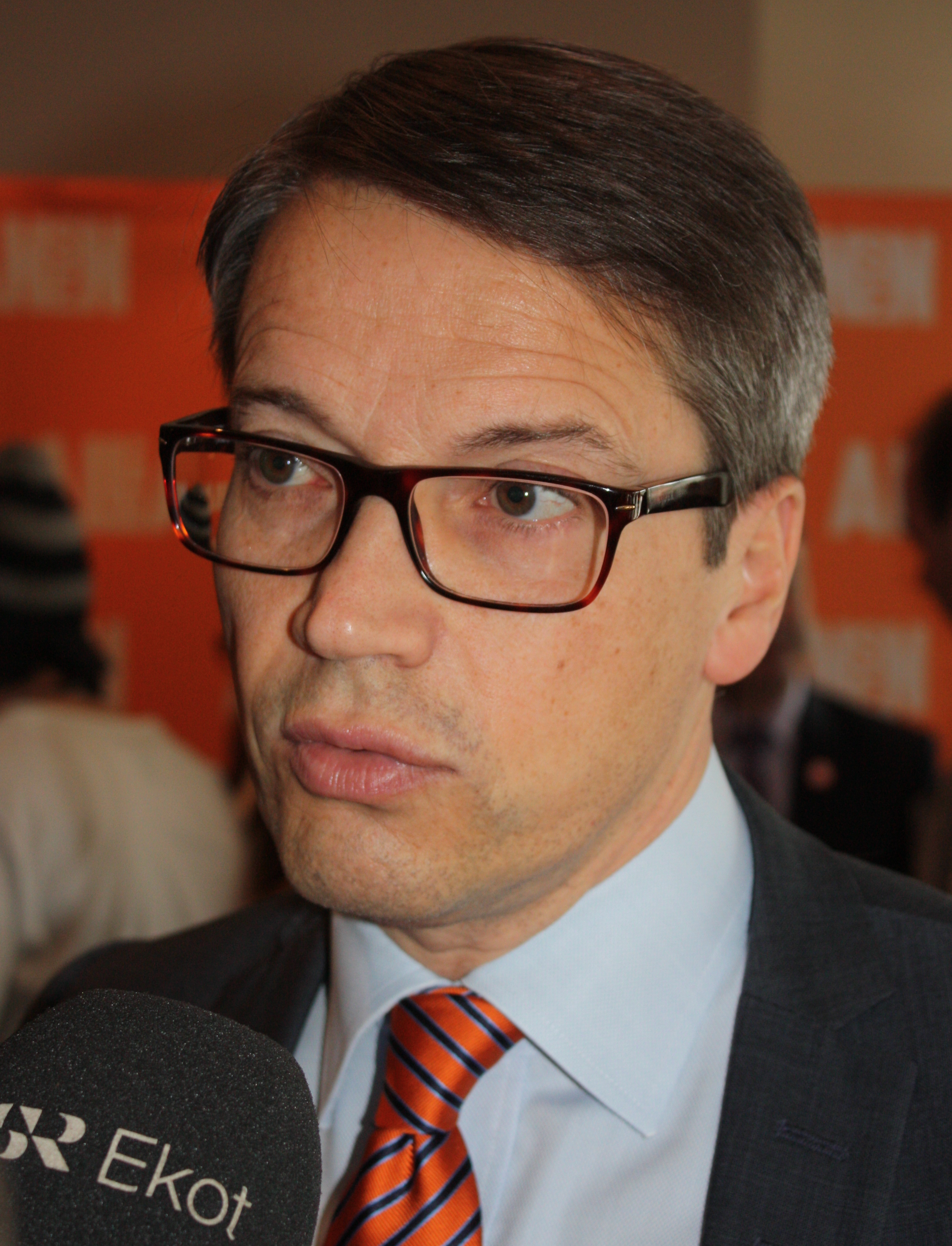
| | First party | Second party | Third party |
|---|---|---|---|
| Leader | Mona Sahlin | Fredrik Reinfeldt | Peter Eriksson; Maria Wetterstrand |
| Party | Social Democrats | Moderate | Green |
| Alliance | Red-Greens | The Alliance | Red-Greens |
| Leader since | 17 March 2007 | 25 October 2003 | 12 May 2002 |
| Last election | 130 | 97 | 19 |
| Seats won | 112 | 107 | 25 |
| Seat change | ▼18 | ▲10 | ▲6 |
| Popular vote | 1,827,497 | 1,791,766 | 437,435 |
| Percentage | 30.7% | 30.1% | 7.3% |
| Swing | ▼4.3 pp | ▲3.9 pp | ▲2.1 pp |
| | Fourth party | Fifth party | Sixth party |
| Leader | Jan Björklund | Maud Olofsson | Jimmie Åkesson |
| Party | Liberals | Centre | Sweden Democrats |
| Alliance | The Alliance | The Alliance |
| Leader since | 7 September 2007 | 19 March 2001 | 7 May 2005 |
| Last election | 28 | 29 | 0 |
| Seats won | 24 | 23 | 20 |
| Seat change | ▼4 | ▼6 | ▲20 |
| Popular vote | 420,524 | 390,804 | 339,610 |
| Percentage | 7.1% | 6.6% | 5.7% |
| Swing | ▼0.4 pp | ▼1.3 pp | ▲2.8 pp |
| | Seventh party | Eighth party |
| Leader | Lars Ohly | Göran Hägglund |
| Party | Left | Christian Democrats |
| Alliance | Red-Greens | The Alliance |
| Leader since | 20 February 2004 | 3 April 2004 |
| Last election | 22 | 24 |
| Seats won | 19 | 19 |
| Seat change | ▼3 | ▼5 |
| Popular vote | 334,053 | 333,696 |
| Percentage | 5.6% | 5.6% |
| Swing | ▼0.3 pp | ▼1.0 pp |
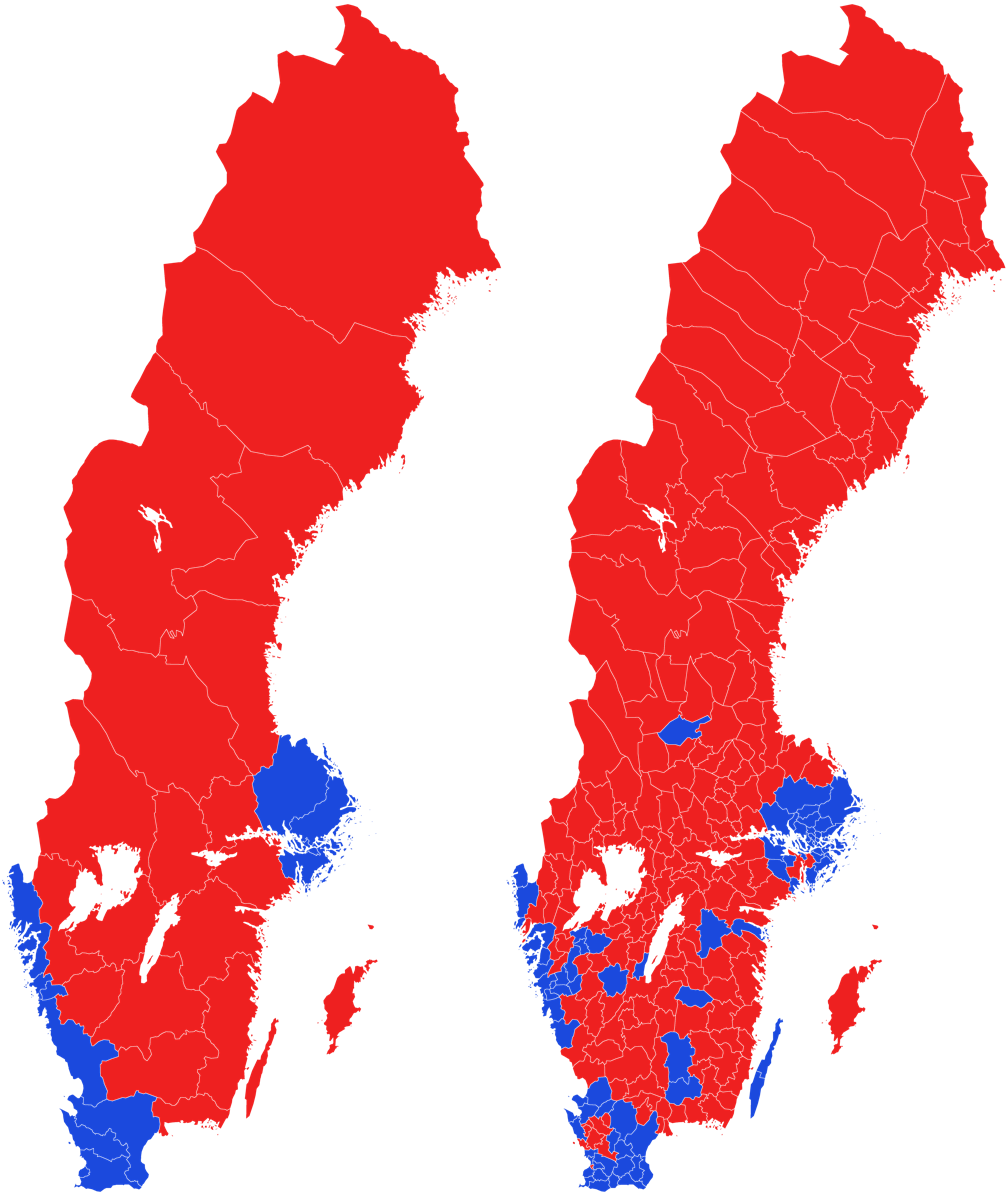
- Red-Social Democratic, Blue-Moderate
Prime Minister before election
Fredrik Reinfeldt
Moderate
Elected Prime Minister
Fredrik Reinfeldt
Moderate

General elections were held in Sweden on 19 September 2010 to elect the 349 members of the Riksdag. The main contenders of the election were the governing centre-right coalition the Alliance, consisting of the Moderate Party, the Centre Party, the Liberal People's Party and the Christian Democrats; and the opposition centre-left coalition the Red-Greens, consisting of the Social Democrats, the Left Party and the Green Party.

The Alliance received 49.27 percent of the votes (an increase by 1.03 pp from the previous election) and 173 seats in the parliament (a decrease by 5 seats and 2 short of an overall majority), while the Red-Greens received 43.60 percent of the vote (a decrease by 2.48 pp) and 156 seats (a decrease by 15 seats). The election also saw the nationalist Sweden Democrats entering parliament for the first time, as the sixth largest and only non-aligned of the eight parties elected to the parliament, by receiving 5.70 percent of the votes (an increase by 2.77 pp) and 20 seats. Both in terms of percentage share; 30.06%, and the actual vote; 1,791,766, the Moderate Party had its strongest election of the unicameral parliamentary era, narrowly missing out on beating the Social Democrats to become the largest party. The Alliance dominated the Stockholm capital region of the municipality and county and made further gains in South Sweden including narrowly flipping Malmö blue as well as winning pluralities in traditionally red towns such as Kalmar, Landskrona and Trelleborg.

The Alliance lost its absolute majority in the parliament but continued to govern as a minority government. The new parliament held its opening session on 5 October, with Prime Minister Fredrik Reinfeldt presenting the annual government policy statement, along with changes to his cabinet. This was the first time in almost a century that a Swedish centre-right government that had served a full term was reelected.

== Campaign ==
One of the main campaign themes was the Economy of Sweden. The Sweden Democrats (SD) stated that it wished to cut political asylum and family reunification immigration by 90 percent. The SD leader Jimmie Åkesson wrote, in an opinion piece for the social-democratic tabloid Aftonbladet that the growth of the country's Muslim population "is the greatest foreign threat to Sweden since the Second World War."

The parties already represented in the Swedish parliament, along with the Swedish television networks, excluded minor parties from the televised political debates. The excluded minor parties included the Sweden Democrats, the June List, the Feminist Initiative, and the Pirate Party.

== Polling ==
After the election in September 2006, the Alliance slipped well behind the opposition in the polls. A Sifo poll conducted in February 2008 showed the opposition leading the Alliance by 19.4%. However, this lead steadily eroded during the second half of the Alliance's term, despite the opposition's uniting in the Red-Green co-operation in December 2008.

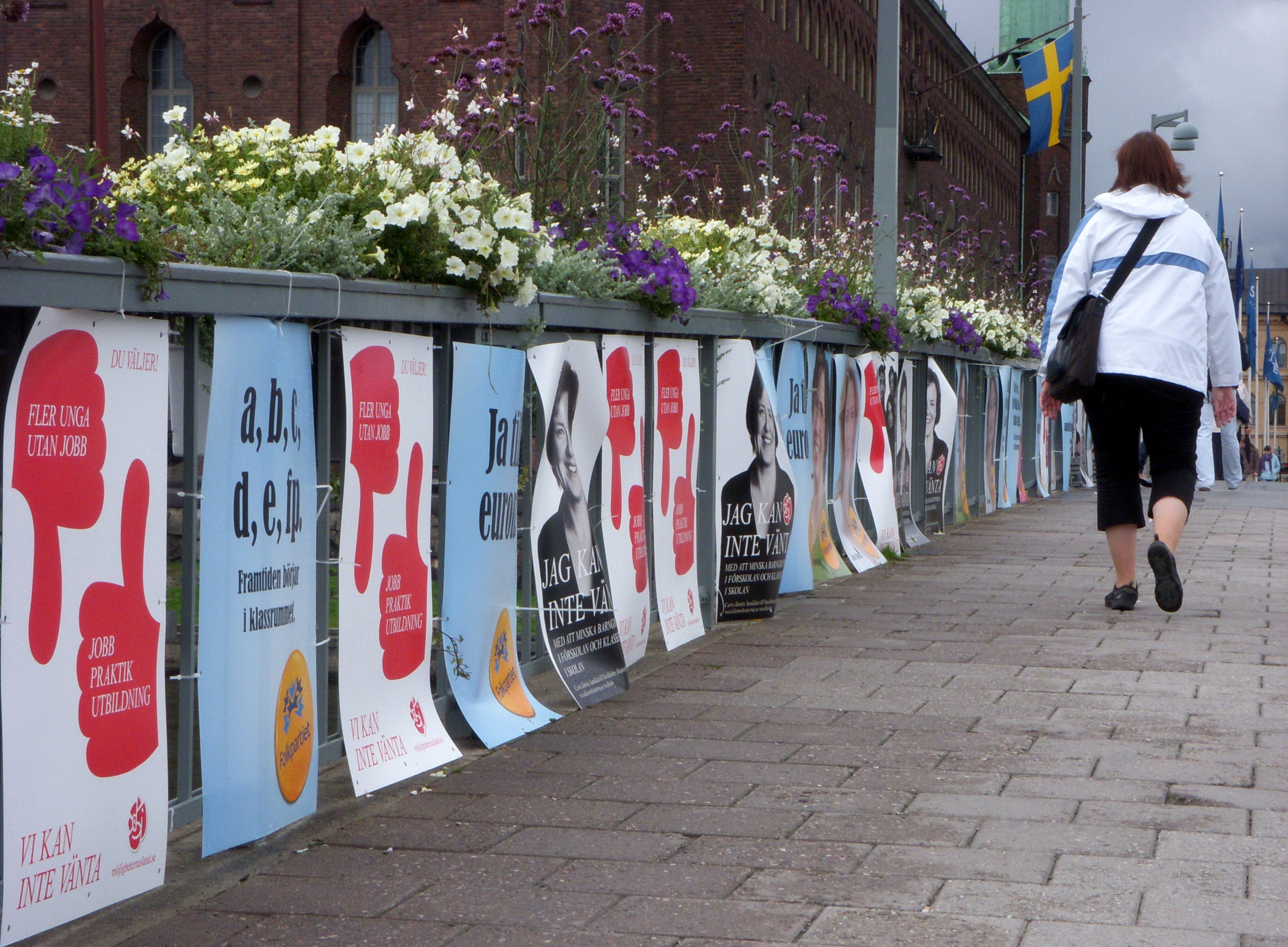
Campaign posters in Stockholm

Poll performance 2006-2010: Key parties ▄ Red-Green coalition █ Social Democratic Party ▄ The Alliance █ Moderate Party

The Sweden Democrats were expected to enter the Parliament for the first time, as the party's polling results had exceeded the 4% entry threshold since June 2009. The Green Party had also made a significant transformation from the smallest elected party to the third largest party during the term, overtaking the Left Party, the Christian Democrats, the Liberals and even the Centre Party in most polls following the 2006 election.

Poll performance 2006-2010: Small parties █ Green Party █ Liberal People's Party ▄ Centre Party █ Left Party ▄ Christian Democrats █ Sweden Democrats █ Other

== Controversy about Sweden Democrats ==
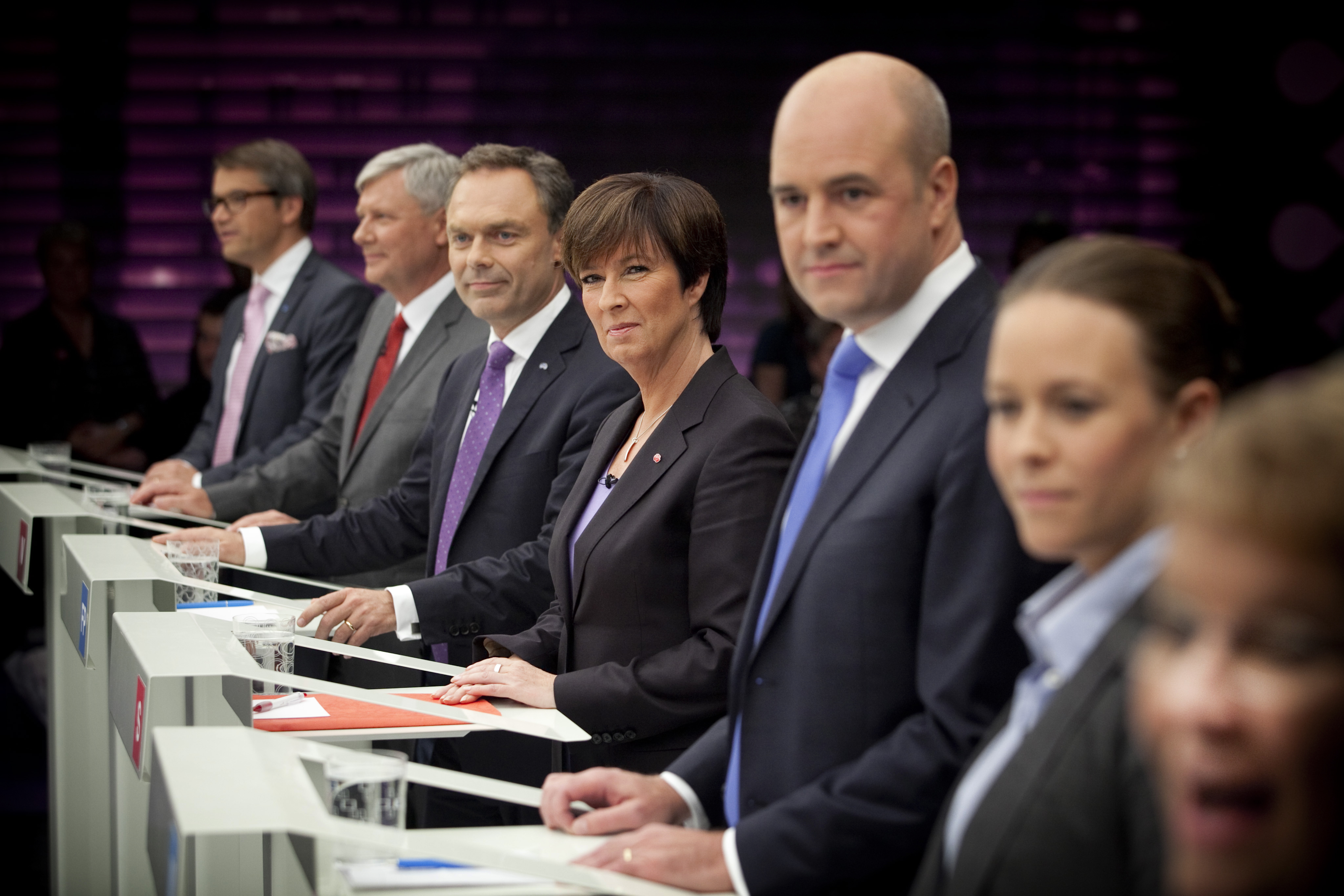
The final election debate on SVT. Party leaders Hägglund (KD), Ohly (V), Björklund (FP), Sahlin (S), Reinfeldt (M), Wetterstrand (MP), and Olofsson (C).

The Sweden Democrats generated controversy before the election. Both the Alliance and the Red-Greens pledged not to seek support from the SD, with Reinfeldt ruling out forming a government in cooperation with the Sweden Democrats.

A privately owned television network, TV4, refused to air a SD campaign video, which was then uploaded to YouTube and viewed more than one million times. The SD video portrayed a track-meet, in which the race is for pension funds. In the video, a Swedish pensioner is outrun by burka-clad women with prams.

Several politicians in Denmark, initially from the Danish People's Party and later from the governing Venstre and the Conservative People's Party, reacted to TV4's refusal to air the video by calling for international election observers to be sent to Sweden. Pia Kjærsgaard, leader of the Danish People's Party, claimed that the election reminded her of "Eastern Europe", and that Sweden was the "banana republic" of the Nordic countries. Per-Willy Amundsen of the Norwegian Progress Party also criticised the decision as a "violation of democratic rules."

=== Violence ===
On 13 September in Gothenburg, about 500 counter-demonstrators prevented the Sweden Democrats from making a planned election rally. Police used pepper spray to disperse the counter-demonstration, which lacked a permit, and seven counter-demonstrators were detained. On 14 September, the Sweden Democrats cancelled planned rallies in three cities, Eskilstuna, Karlstad, and Uddevalla, because of security concerns. Similarly, concerns about security led to an election tour being cancelled on 15 September in Norrköping.

After these cancelled election rallies, the National Police Commissioner Bengt Svenson severely criticized the county police for failing to safeguard the Sweden Democrats: "If it is not possible to protect them [in those locales], the police have failed in its planning and execution of its mission. ... It is a serious problem when such meetings cannot be held, because it is our absolute duty to ensure that the constitutionally guaranteed rights be maintained and that all meetings can be held".

=== Consequences ===
These attempts to limit the SD message were described by Al Jazeera as counterproductive, in that they enabled the SD to portray itself as a victim of censorship.

Similarly, Hanne Kjöller of Dagens Nyheter hypothesised that the attacks strengthened the Sweden Democrats rather than hurting the party's support base. "Jimmie Åkesson becomes a poor underdog and the picture of a party that is holding some dangerous but important truth is enhanced. The Sweden Democrats should send flowers to the left-wing extremists, thanking them for the publicity."

== Results ==
Coalition dominance by municipality (colors aggravated, not linearly proportional).: Red‑Greens; Equal; The Alliance

Relative support of the Sweden Democrats by municipality.: Sweden Democrats (max. 15.84% in Sjöbo)

There were 5,960,408 valid ballots cast for a turnout of 84.63%.

| Party | Votes | % | Seats | +/– |
|---|---|---|---|---|
| Swedish Social Democratic Party | 1,827,497 | 30.66 | 112 | –18 |
| Moderate Party | 1,791,766 | 30.06 | 107 | +10 |
| Green Party | 437,435 | 7.34 | 25 | +6 |
| Liberal People's Party | 420,524 | 7.06 | 24 | –4 |
| Centre Party | 390,804 | 6.56 | 23 | –6 |
| Sweden Democrats | 339,610 | 5.70 | 20 | +20 |
| Left Party | 334,053 | 5.60 | 19 | –3 |
| Christian Democrats | 333,696 | 5.60 | 19 | –5 |
| Pirate Party | 38,491 | 0.65 | 0 | 0 |
| Feminist Initiative | 24,139 | 0.40 | 0 | 0 |
| Swedish Senior Citizen Interest Party | 11,078 | 0.19 | 0 | 0 |
| Rural Democrats | 1,565 | 0.03 | 0 | New |
| Socialist Justice Party | 1,507 | 0.03 | 0 | 0 |
| Norrländska Coalition | 1,456 | 0.02 | 0 | New |
| National Democrats | 1,141 | 0.02 | 0 | 0 |
| Classical Liberal Party | 716 | 0.01 | 0 | 0 |
| Freedom Party | 688 | 0.01 | 0 | New |
| Party of the Swedes | 681 | 0.01 | 0 | 0 |
| Unity | 632 | 0.01 | 0 | 0 |
| Communist Party | 375 | 0.01 | 0 | 0 |
| Spirits Party | 237 | 0.00 | 0 | New |
| European Workers Party | 187 | 0.00 | 0 | 0 |
| Health Care Party | 185 | 0.00 | 0 | 0 |
| Alliance Party | 87 | 0.00 | 0 | 0 |
| Direct Democrats | 76 | 0.00 | 0 | 0 |
| National Democratic Party | 63 | 0.00 | 0 | 0 |
| Population Party | 35 | 0.00 | 0 | New |
| Communist League | 26 | 0.00 | 0 | 0 |
| Freedom and Justice Party | 19 | 0.00 | 0 | 0 |
| Scania Party | 17 | 0.00 | 0 | 0 |
| Republicans | 14 | 0.00 | 0 | 0 |
| Republican Party | 10 | 0.00 | 0 | New |
| Nordic Union | 5 | 0.00 | 0 | 0 |
| Alexander's Lista | 4 | 0.00 | 0 | New |
| Li Yu Chen Andersson Party | 4 | 0.00 | 0 | New |
| Rikshushållarna | 3 | 0.00 | 0 | 0 |
| Labour Market Party UPI | 2 | 0.00 | 0 | New |
| Parties not on the ballot | 1,580 | 0.03 | 0 | – |
| Total | 5,960,408 | 100.00 | 349 | 0 |
| Valid votes | 5,960,408 | 98.87 | | |
| Invalid/blank votes | 68,274 | 1.13 | | |
| Total votes | 6,028,682 | 100.00 | | |
| Registered voters/turnout | 7,123,651 | 84.63 | | |
Source: Val

=== Seat distribution ===
| Constituency | Total seats | Seats won | | | | | | | | | | |
| Constituency | Total seats | By party | | | | | | | | By coalition | | |
| Constituency | Total seats | S | M | MP | FP | C | SD | V | KD | Alliance | Red-Greens | Others |
|---|---|---|---|---|---|---|---|---|---|---|---|---|
| Blekinge | 6 | 3 | 2 | | | | 1 | | | 2 | 3 | 1 |
| Dalarna | 11 | 4 | 3 | 1 | | 1 | 1 | 1 | | 4 | 6 | 1 |
| Gävleborg | 12 | 4 | 3 | 1 | 1 | 1 | 1 | 1 | | 5 | 6 | 1 |
| Gothenburg | 18 | 5 | 5 | 2 | 1 | 1 | 1 | 2 | 1 | 8 | 9 | 1 |
| Gotland | 2 | 1 | 1 | | | | | | | 1 | 1 | |
| Halland | 12 | 3 | 4 | 1 | 1 | 1 | 1 | | 1 | 7 | 4 | 1 |
| Jämtland | 4 | 2 | 1 | | | 1 | | | | 2 | 2 | |
| Jönköping | 13 | 4 | 3 | 1 | 1 | 1 | 1 | | 2 | 7 | 5 | 1 |
| Kalmar | 9 | 4 | 3 | | | 1 | | | 1 | 5 | 4 | |
| Kronoberg | 6 | 3 | 2 | | | 1 | | | | 3 | 3 | |
| Malmö | 10 | 3 | 3 | 1 | 1 | | 1 | 1 | | 4 | 5 | 1 |
| Norrbotten | 9 | 6 | 2 | | | | | 1 | | 2 | 7 | |
| Örebro | 12 | 4 | 3 | 1 | 1 | | 1 | 1 | 1 | 5 | 6 | 1 |
| Östergötland | 15 | 5 | 4 | 1 | 1 | 1 | 1 | 1 | 1 | 7 | 7 | 1 |
| Skåne North and East | 12 | 3 | 4 | 1 | 1 | 1 | 1 | | 1 | 7 | 4 | 1 |
| Skåne South | 13 | 3 | 5 | 1 | 1 | 1 | 1 | | 1 | 8 | 4 | 1 |
| Skåne West | 10 | 3 | 4 | 1 | 1 | | 1 | | | 5 | 4 | 1 |
| Södermanland | 11 | 4 | 3 | 1 | 1 | 1 | 1 | | | 5 | 5 | 1 |
| Stockholm County | 38 | 8 | 15 | 3 | 3 | 2 | 2 | 2 | 3 | 23 | 13 | 2 |
| Stockholm Municipality | 29 | 6 | 10 | 3 | 3 | 2 | 1 | 2 | 2 | 17 | 11 | 1 |
| Uppsala | 13 | 3 | 4 | 1 | 1 | 1 | 1 | 1 | 1 | 7 | 5 | 1 |
| Värmland | 12 | 5 | 3 | 1 | 1 | 1 | | 1 | | 5 | 7 | |
| Västerbotten | 11 | 4 | 2 | 1 | 1 | 1 | | 1 | 1 | 5 | 6 | |
| Västernorrland | 9 | 5 | 2 | | | 1 | | 1 | | 3 | 6 | |
| Västmanland | 11 | 4 | 3 | 1 | 1 | | 1 | 1 | | 4 | 6 | 1 |
| Västra Götaland East | 10 | 4 | 3 | | 1 | 1 | | | 1 | 6 | 4 | |
| Västra Götaland North | 12 | 3 | 3 | 1 | 1 | 1 | 1 | 1 | 1 | 6 | 5 | 1 |
| Västra Götaland South | 6 | 3 | 3 | | | | | | | 3 | 3 | |
| Västra Götaland West | 13 | 3 | 4 | 1 | 1 | 1 | 1 | 1 | 1 | 7 | 5 | 1 |
| Total | 349 | 112 | 107 | 25 | 24 | 23 | 20 | 19 | 19 | 173 | 156 | 20 |
Source: Statistics Sweden

== Reactions ==
As exit polls conducted by the national broadcaster Swedish Television predicted, the Sweden Democrats reached the 4% threshold needed to enter parliament, making this election the first in which they were able to enter parliament.

A preliminary count of 5,668 voting districts showed the Alliance with 172 seats, ahead of the Red-Greens. However, this fell short of the 175 seats needed for an absolute majority, and it appeared the Sweden Democrats would hold the balance of power in the new parliament. Reinfeldt declared that he had no intention to cooperate with the Sweden Democrats.

On 23 September, the final results showed the Centre Party gaining an adjustment seat in Dalarna, giving the Alliance a total seat count of 173, still two seats short of an absolute majority. The Alliance's Liberal People's Party were only 7 and 19 votes short from gaining additional seats in Gothenburg and Värmland respectively, but according to Svante Linusson, a professor in mathematics, the actual margin was still over 800 votes.

On the day after the election, rallies against the Sweden Democrats took place in a number of Swedish cities. Reports indicated that 10,000 people were estimated to have marched in Stockholm under banners reading "We are ashamed", "No racists in Parliament", and "Refugees – welcome!". In Gothenburg, 5,000 people took part in a "sorrow march against racism", and 2,000 people marched in Malmö. Support for the Sweden Democrats was strongest in the southernmost province Scania, where the party received about 10% of the vote, and in the neighbouring province Blekinge, where they received 9.8%.

Liberal evening tabloid Expressen wrote in an editorial "The banner of tolerance has been hauled down and the forces of darkness have finally also taken the Swedish democracy as hostage. It's a day of sorrow." Liberal conservative morning newspaper Svenska Dagbladet said "[It is] time for the Swedes to get themselves a new national self-image [as the election] created a new picture of Sweden".

== Analysis ==
While it's hard to say that Sweden has woken up to a new self-image, one can say that this is more like a normal European situation and is similar to other western European countries with a proportional election system, where a populist right-wing party has seats in parliament. It's the party that is the least liked among other voters, so it is not surprising that people have reacted with dismay.

— Carl Dahlstroem, professor of politics at University of Gothenburg

The election was a landmark for its impact on the Social Democrats, which had been in government for 65 of the last 78 years and who had never lost two consecutive elections. This was their worst result since universal suffrage in 1921. Swedish political scientist Stig-Björn Ljunggren said "The Social Democrats no longer symbolise the Swedish model. They've lost their magic." Dagens Nyheter postulated that electoral failure was based on internal factors, such that the Social Democrats failed to win over the middle class and had completely lost touch with their original vision, which had made them a dominant political party.

The Irish Times saw the rise of the SD as sending "ripples of shock not only through the country but through European politics," and asked "Is this finally it for the 'Swedish model'" that has been represented as a "meld of liberal values, high taxes, outstanding childcare and welfare that made the country the poster boy for European social democracy?" The Social Democrats' failure reflected the party's inability to adapt, an increasingly technocratic profile, a failure to address immigration concerns, as well as Reinfeldt's success in managing the economy. The results draws parallels with a larger decline of European left parties. An article in Al Jazeera English asked if Western political dynamics were changing following the Swedish and United States elections. The article said that predictions after the election indicated "an entirely new political landscape" and "the beginning of an era of sharper political division in Sweden." It asked if the similar results "reflect rather an underlying continuity in the generation-long evolution of Euro-American politics towards a fully neoliberalised system" and that Sweden seemed to be "moving towards an outdated model." It also said that, while social policies were similarly moving to the right, economic policies were poles apart, with the emergence of far-right parties in Sweden and Denmark still supporting the welfare state and the American parties remaining on the economic right-wing.

The case of Annika Holmqvist, a seriously ill 55-year-old woman who had her sickness benefits withdrawn and was requested to seek work, allegedly due to the Alliance's reforms of Sweden's social security system, gave the opposition a late boost in its campaign. The Local thinks it might have deprived the Alliance of an overall majority. Holmqvist's daughter wrote about her case in a web log post that gained publicity and became a hot topic in the debates. In spite of promises of a solution, after the election it was decided Holmqvist will lose her illness benefits.

The Moderate Party was still seen as one of the big winners of the election because of its "well-executed campaign" that emphasised Sweden's "remarkable political and economic stability in a turbulent world" after Sweden weathered the Great Recession; despite mass unemployment, the economic growth in 2010 was the highest in Western Europe.

== Government formation ==
The Alliance formed the new government with Reinfeldt continuing as prime minister. His cabinet has 24 ministers, three more than the previous one. The Moderates received 13 posts, an increase of three from their previous count, with the Liberals (4), Centre (4) and Christian Democrats (3) not gaining or losing ministers. Jan Björklund, the leader of the Liberal Party, was promoted to Deputy Prime Minister replacing Maud Olofsson. Carl Bildt remained Foreign Minister and Anders Borg remained Minister for Finance. The new ministers are Stefan Attefall, the Minister for Public Administration and Housing at the Ministry of Health and Social Affairs; Ulf Kristersson, replacing Cristina Husmark Pehrsson as Minister for Social Security; Erik Ullenhag, the Minister for Integration at the Ministry of Employment; Hillevi Engström, the Minister for Employment; Anna-Karin Hatt, the Minister for Information Technology and Regional Affairs at the Ministry of Enterprise, Energy and Communications; Peter Norman, replacing Mats Odell as Minister for Financial Markets; and Catharina Elmsäter-Svärd, replacing Åsa Torstensson as Minister for Communications. Tobias Krantz, former Minister of Higher Education at the Ministry of Education and Research, is leaving with no successor having been named.

After the formation of the new government, Reinfeldt issued a 27-page government policy statement, saying it would "seek broad and responsible solutions", and that it would "be natural to hold regular discussions with primarily the Green Party but also the Social Democratic Party where appropriate".

== Criticism ==
Representatives of the Danish parties Venstre, De Konservative, and Dansk Folkeparti criticized Sweden during the 2010 election campaign after TV4 stopped the Sweden Democrats' election commercial. Venstre's foreign affairs spokesman, Michael Aastrup Jensen, said he would raise the issue of Swedish political censorship at the next meeting of the Council of Europe and propose that the council send election observers to Sweden ahead of the election on 19 September.
