= Bengt K. Å. Johansson =

Swedish politician (1937–2021)

Bengt K.Å Johansson

Minister for Civil Service Affairs
- In office 1988–1991
- Preceded by: Bo Holmberg
- Succeeded by: Inger Davidson

Deputy Minister of Finance
- In office 1985–1988
- Preceded by: Marianne Wahlberg
- Succeeded by: Odd Engström

Minister for Consumer Affairs
- In office 17 October 1985 – 4 October 1988
- Preceded by: position established
- Succeeded by: Margot Wallström

Governor of Älvsborg County
- In office 1991–1997
- Preceded by: Göte Fridh
- Succeeded by: position abolished

Personal details
- Born: Bengt Karl Åke Johansson; 4 January 1937 Sandared, Sweden
- Died: 27 September 2021 (aged 84) Stockholm, Sweden
- Party: S/SAP

Bengt Karl Åke Johansson (4 January 1937 – 27 September 2021) was a Swedish politician. A member of the Swedish Social Democratic Party, he served as Minister for Consumer Affairs and Deputy Minister of Finance from 1985 to 1988, Minister for Civil Service Affairs from 1988 to 1991, and governor of Älvsborg County from 1991 to 1997.
