= Minister for Consumer Affairs (Sweden) =

- Sveriges konsumentminister
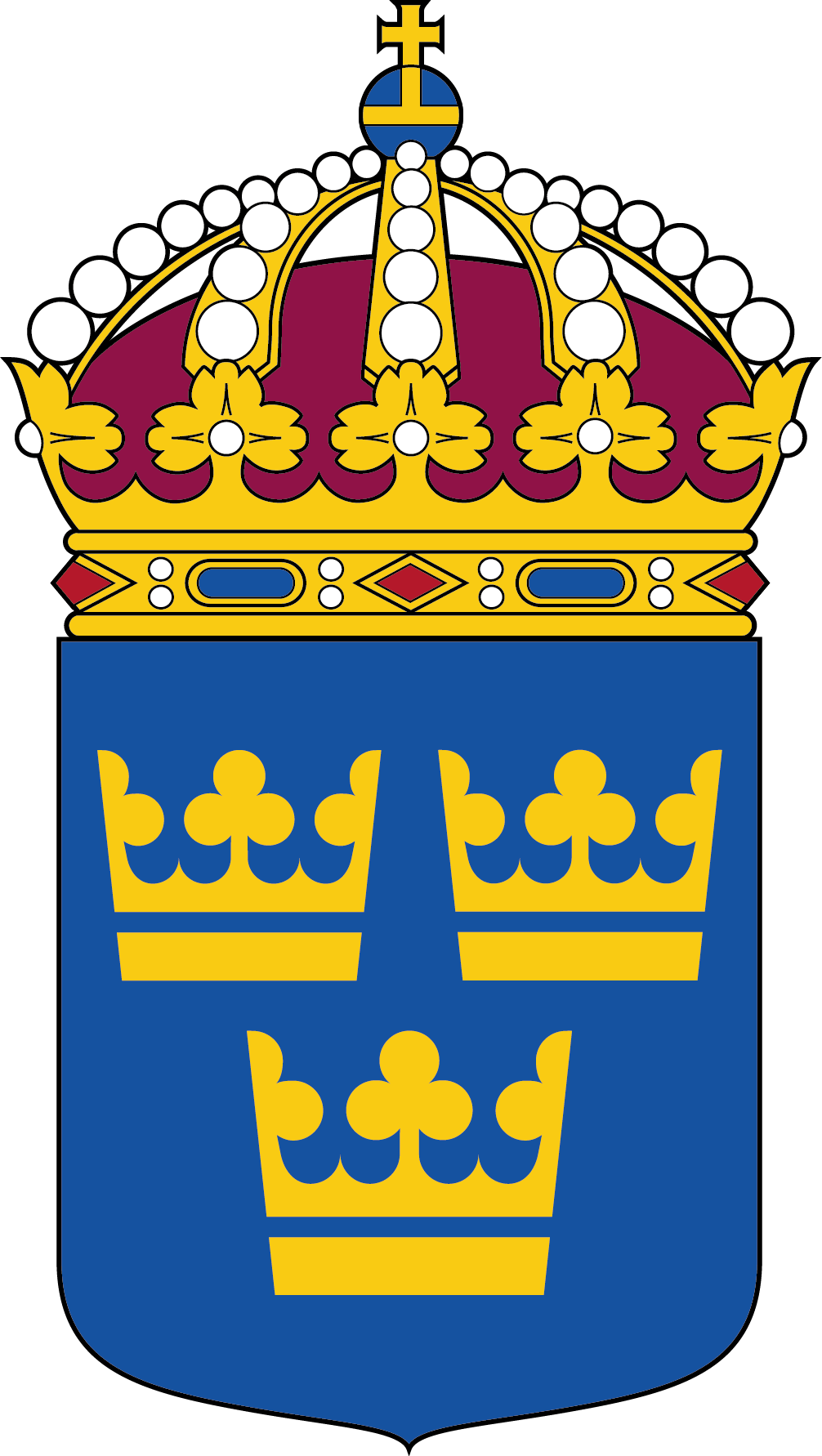

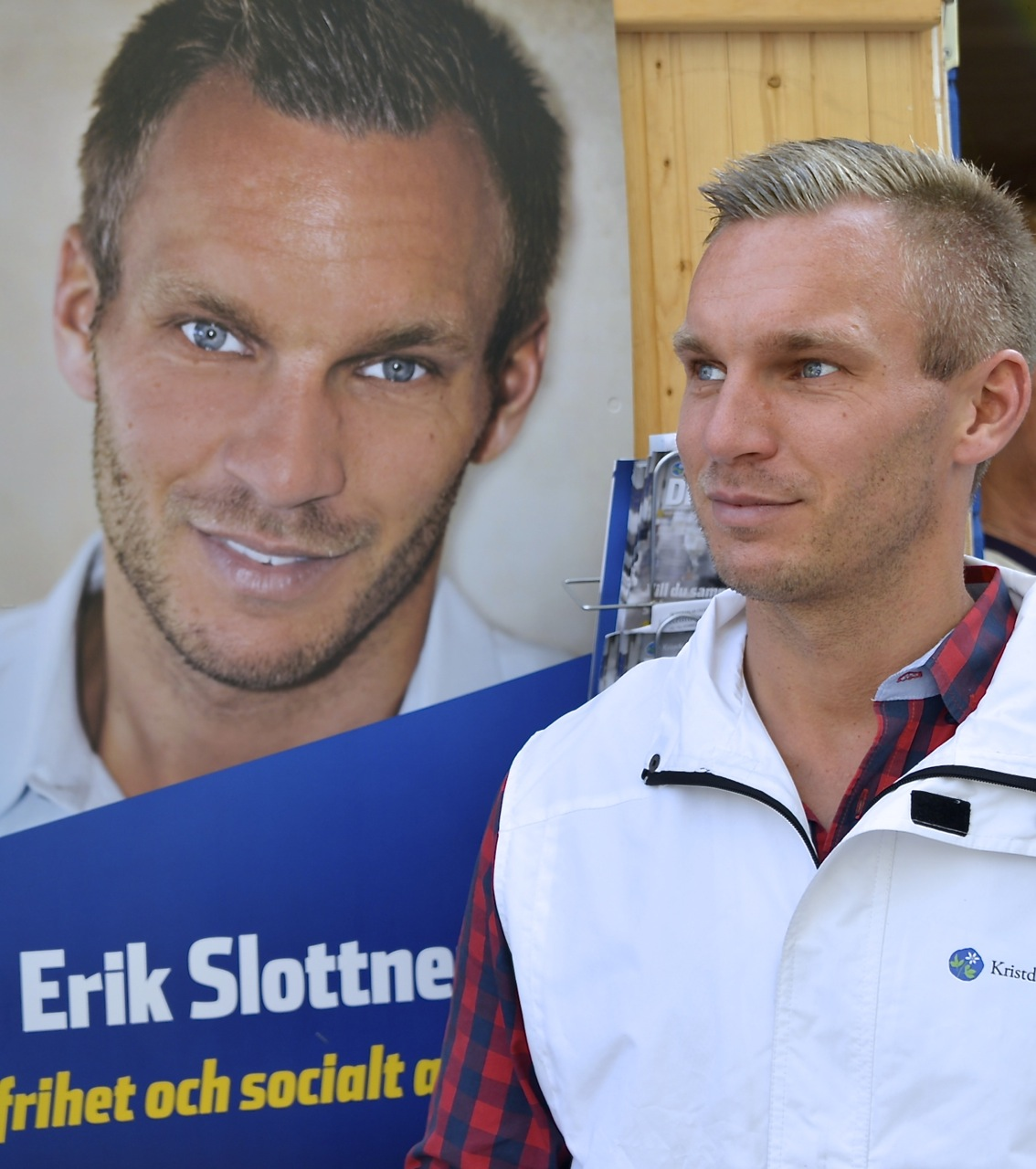
- Incumbent; Erik Slottner since 18 October 2022
- Ministry of Finance
- Appointer: The Prime Minister
- Inaugural holder: Bengt K.Å. Johansson
- Formation: 1985

The Minister for Consumer Affairs (Swedish: konsumentminister) is a cabinet minister within the Government of Sweden and appointed by the Prime Minister of Sweden.

The minister is responsible for issues regarding consumer protection. The position of Minister for Consumer Affairs has usually been held by a minister as a part of a wider ministerial portfolio, and it has sorted under different ministries throughout the years.

== List of ministers for consumer affairs ==
No.	Portrait	Minister (Born–Died)	Tenure			Political party	Cabinet
No.	Portrait	Minister (Born–Died)	Took office	Left office	Duration	Political party	Cabinet
1		Bengt K.Å. Johansson (1937–2021)	17 October 1985	4 October 1988	2 years, 353 days	Social Democrats	Palme II; S
1		Bengt K.Å. Johansson (1937–2021)	17 October 1985	4 October 1988	2 years, 353 days	Social Democrats	Carlsson I S
2		Margot Wallström (born 1954)	4 October 1988	4 October 1991	3 years, 0 days	Social Democrats	Carlsson I S
2		Margot Wallström (born 1954)	4 October 1988	4 October 1991	3 years, 0 days	Social Democrats	Carlsson II; S
3		Inger Davidsson (born 1944)	4 October 1991	7 October 1994	3 years, 3 days	Christian Democrats	Carl Bildt; M–FP–C–KD
4		Marita Ulvskog (born 1951)	7 October 1994	22 March 1996	1 year, 167 days	Social Democrats	Carlsson III; S
5		Leif Blomberg (1941–1998)	22 March 1996	2 March 1998 †	1 year, 345 days	Social Democrats	Persson; S
6		Lars Engqvist (born 1945)	25 March 1998	7 October 1998	196 days	Social Democrats	Persson; S
7		Britta Lejon (born 1964)	7 October 1998	15 October 2002	4 years, 8 days	Social Democrats	Persson; S
8		Ann-Christin Nykvist (born 1948)	15 October 2002	6 October 2006	3 years, 356 days	Social Democrats	Persson; S
9		Nyamko Sabuni (born 1969)	6 October 2006	5 October 2010	3 years, 364 days	Liberal People's	Reinfeldt; M–C–FP–KD
10		Birgitta Ohlsson (born 1975)	5 October 2010	3 October 2014	3 years, 363 days	Liberal People's	Reinfeldt; M–C–FP–KD
11		Per Bolund (born 1971)	3 October 2014	21 January 2019	4 years, 110 days	Green	Löfven; S–MP
12		Ardalan Shekarabi (born 1978)	21 January 2019	1 October 2019	253 days	Social Democrats	Löfven II; S–MP
13		Lena Micko (born 1955)	1 October 2019	30 November 2021	2 years, 60 days	Social Democrats	Löfven II; S–MP; Löfven III; S–MP
14		Max Elger (born 1973)	30 November 2021	18 October 2022	322 days	Social Democrats	Andersson; S
14		Erik Slottner (born 1980)	18 October 2022		3 years, 324 days	Christian Democrats	Kristersson; M–KD–L

== Other positions of the ministers and ministry history ==
Name	Other positions	Ministry	Term
Bengt K.Å. Johansson	Minister for the Salary and Deputy Minister for Finance	Ministry of Finance	1985–1988
Margot Wallström	Minister for Religious Communities; Minister for the Youth	Ministry of Civil Affairs / Ministry of the Interior	1988–1998
Inger Davidsson	Minister for Civil Affairs	Ministry of Civil Affairs / Ministry of the Interior	1988–1998
Marita Ulvskog	Minister for Civil Affairs	Ministry of Civil Affairs / Ministry of the Interior	1988–1998
Leif Blomberg	Minister for Integration; Minister for Sports; Minister for the Youth	Ministry of Civil Affairs / Ministry of the Interior	1988–1998
Lars Engqvist	Minister for Home Affairs	Ministry of Civil Affairs / Ministry of the Interior	1988–1998
Britta Lejon	Deputy Minister for Justice; Minister for Democracy; Minister for the Youth	Ministry of Justice	1998–2002
Ann-Christin Nykvist	Minister for Agriculture	Ministry of Agriculture	2002–2006
Nyamko Sabuni	Minister for Integration; Minister for Gender Equality	Ministry of Integration and Gender Equality	2006–2010
Birgitta Ohlsson	Minister for EU Affairs; Minister for Democracy	The Prime Minister's Office	2010–2014
Per Bolund	Minister for Financial Markets; Deputy Minister for Finance	Ministry of Finance	2014–2019
Ardalan Shekarabi	Minister for Public Administration	Ministry of Finance	2019
Lena Micko	Minister for Public Administration	Ministry of Finance	2019–2021
Max Elger	Minister for Financial Markets	Ministry of Finance	2021–present
