= Daniel Helldén =

Swedish politician (born 1965)

- Helldén in 2026

Spokesperson of the Green Party
- Incumbent
- Assumed office 18 November 2023 Serving with Märta Stenevi (2023–2024); Amanda Lind (2024–)
- Preceded by: Per Bolund

Member of the Riksdag
- Incumbent
- Assumed office 26 September 2022
- Constituency: Stockholm Municipality

Personal details
- Born: 27 June 1965 (age 61) Luleå, Sweden
- Party: Green
- Spouse: Kristina Hanson Granqvist
- Children: 3
- Education: Stockholm University (PhD)

Daniel Helldén (born 27 June 1965) is a Swedish politician for the Green Party. He has been co-spokesperson of the Green Party since November 2023 and has been Member of the Riksdag since September 2022, representing the constituency of Stockholm Municipality.

Helldén earned a PhD in political science from Stockholm University in 2005, writing his dissertation on the Battle of the Elms. Helldén led the Green Party in the Stockholm Municipality council between 2011 and 2022, and served as Vice Mayor and City Commissioner for Transportation from 2014 to 2022.

Party political offices
| Preceded by Per Bolund | Spokesperson of the Green Party Serving with: Märta Stenevi; 2023–present | Incumbent |
