= Minister for Housing (Sweden) =

- Bostadsminister
- Lesser coat of arms of Sweden

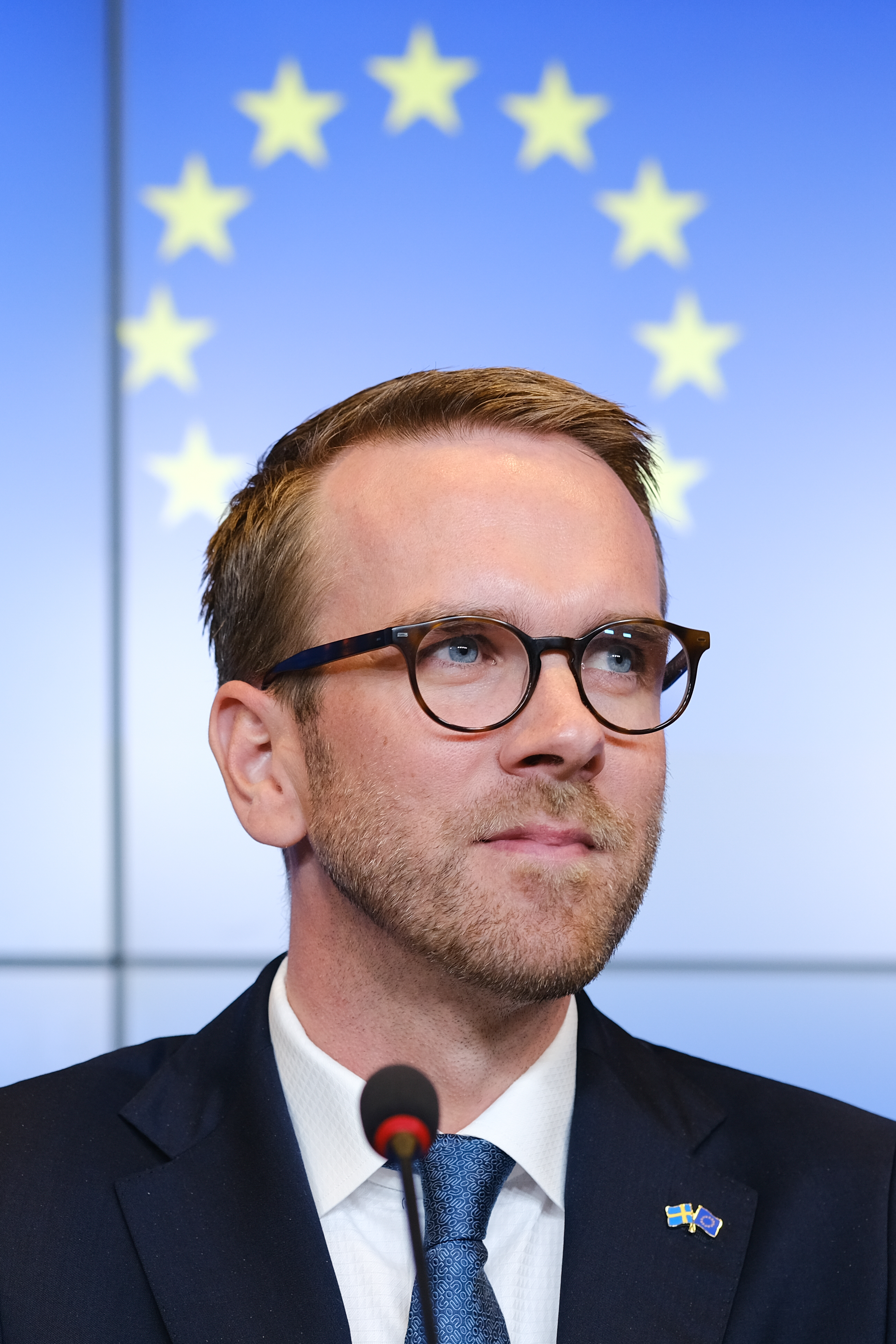
- Incumbent; Andreas Carlson since 18 October 2022
- Ministry of Employment
- Member of: The Government
- Appointer: The Prime Minister
- Term length: Serves at the pleasure of the Prime Minister
- Inaugural holder: Ingvar Carlsson
- Formation: 1974

The Minister for Housing (Note: Minister for Housing or Minister of Housing [and Local Government].) (Swedish: Bostadsminister) is a cabinet minister within the Swedish Government and appointed by the Prime Minister of Sweden.

The minister is responsible for issues regarding housing and constructing new houses and apartments. The current minister for housing is Andreas Carlson, appointed on 18 October 2022.

Between 1974 and 1991, there was a ministry called the Ministry of Housing. The minister for housing was the head of the Ministry of Housing. In 1991, the ministry was dissolved and the position was abolished. In 1994, the position was reinstated and a cabinet minister was given the responsibility for housing issues. Since 1994, there has always been a cabinet minister with responsibility for housing issues. Ministers for housing have all worked in different ministries. ”Statsråd med ansvar över bostadsfrågor” means Councillor of State with responsibility for issues regarding housing'.

== List of officeholders ==
=== Minister for Housing and Head of the Ministry of Housing 1974—1991 ===
No.	Portrait	Minister (Born–Died)	Tenure			Political party	Cabinet
No.	Portrait	Minister (Born–Died)	Took office	Left office	Duration	Political party	Cabinet
1		Ingvar Carlsson (born 1934)	1 January 1974	8 October 1976	2 years, 281 days	Social Democrats	Palme I
2		Elvy Olsson (1923-2022)	8 October 1976	18 October 1978	2 years, 10 days	Centre	Fälldin I
3		Birgit Friggebo (born 1941)	18 October 1978	8 October 1982	3 years, 355 days	Liberal People's	
3		Birgit Friggebo (born 1941)	18 October 1978	8 October 1982	3 years, 355 days	Liberal People's	Ullsten
3		Birgit Friggebo (born 1941)	18 October 1978	8 October 1982	3 years, 355 days	Liberal People's	Fälldin II
3		Birgit Friggebo (born 1941)	18 October 1978	8 October 1982	3 years, 355 days	Liberal People's	Fälldin III
4		Hans Gustafsson (1923—1998)	8 October 1982	4 October 1988	5 years, 362 days	Social Democrats	
4		Hans Gustafsson (1923—1998)	8 October 1982	4 October 1988	5 years, 362 days	Social Democrats	Palme II
4		Hans Gustafsson (1923—1998)	8 October 1982	4 October 1988	5 years, 362 days	Social Democrats	Carlsson I
5		Ulf Lönnqvist (1936–2022)	4 October 1988	4 October 1991	3 years, 0 days	Social Democrats	
5		Ulf Lönnqvist (1936–2022)	4 October 1988	4 October 1991	3 years, 0 days	Social Democrats	Carlsson I
5		Ulf Lönnqvist (1936–2022)	4 October 1988	4 October 1991	3 years, 0 days	Social Democrats	Carlsson II
(3)		Birgit Friggebo (born 1941)	4 October 1991	30 November 1991	57 days	Liberal People's	Carl Bildt
The Ministry of Housing was dissolved in 1991 and the position was abolished 1991–1994
=== Minister for Housing 1994—present ===
No.	Portrait	Minister (Born–Died)	Tenure			Political party	Cabinet
No.	Portrait	Minister (Born–Died)	Took office	Left office	Duration	Political party	Cabinet
6		Jörgen Andersson (born 1946)	7 October 1994	22 March 1996	1 year, 167 days	Social Democrats	Carlsson III
7		Thomas Östros (born 1965)	22 March 1996	6 October 1998	2 years, 198 days	Social Democrats	Persson
8		Lars Engqvist (born 1945)	6 October 1998	16 November 1998	41 days	Social Democrats	Persson
9		Lars-Erik Lövdén (born 1950)	16 November 1998	21 October 2004	5 years, 340 days	Social Democrats	Persson
10		Mona Sahlin (born 1957)	21 October 2004	6 October 2006	1 year, 350 days	Social Democrats	Persson
11		Mats Odell (born 1947)	6 October 2006	5 October 2010	3 years, 364 days	Christian Democrats	Reinfeldt
12		Stefan Attefall (born 1960)	5 October 2010	3 October 2014	3 years, 363 days	Christian Democrats	Reinfeldt
13		Mehmet Kaplan (born 1971)	3 October 2014	18 April 2016	1 year, 198 days	Green	Löfven
—		Per Bolund (born 1971)	18 April 2016	25 May 2016	37 days	Green	Löfven
13		Peter Eriksson (born 1958)	25 May 2016	21 January 2019	2 years, 241 days	Green	Löfven
14		Per Bolund (born 1971)	21 January 2019	5 February 2021	2 years, 15 days	Green	Löfven
15		Märta Stenevi (born 1976)	5 February 2021	30 November 2021	298 days	Green	Löfven
16		Johan Danielsson (born 1982)	30 November 2021	18 October 2022	322 days	Social Democratic Party	Andersson
17		Andreas Carlson (born 1987)	18 October 2022	Incumbent	4 years, 17 days	Christian Democrats	Kristersson
