= Märta Stenevi =

Swedish politician (born 1976)

Märta Stenevi MP
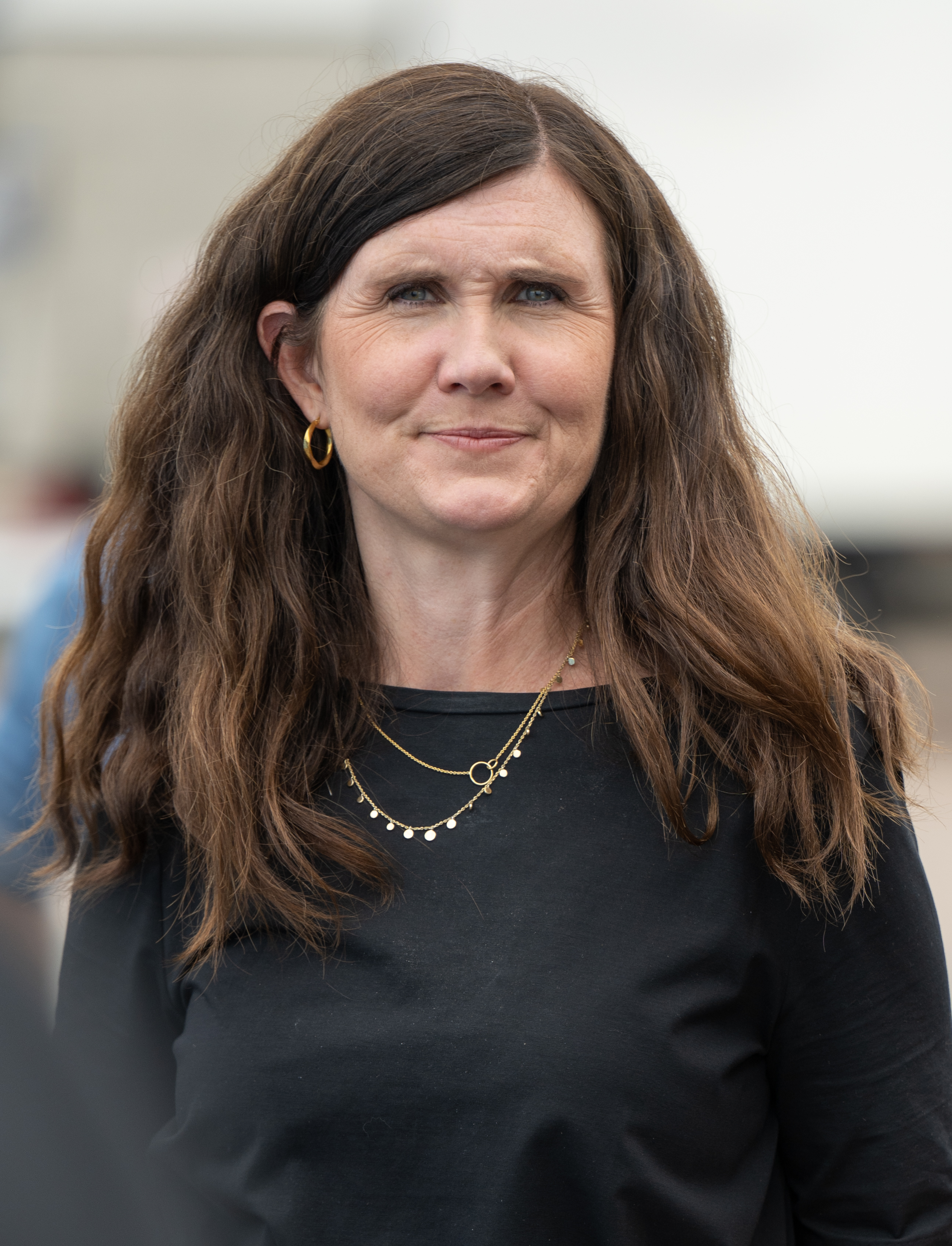
- Märta Stenevi in August 2022

Minister for Gender Equality
- In office 5 February 2021 – 30 November 2021
- Monarch: Carl XVI Gustaf
- Prime Minister: Stefan Löfven
- Preceded by: Åsa Lindhagen
- Succeeded by: Eva Nordmark

Minister for Housing
- In office 5 February 2021 – 30 November 2021
- Prime Minister: Stefan Löfven
- Preceded by: Per Bolund
- Succeeded by: Johan Danielsson

Spokesperson of the Green Party
- In office 31 January 2021 – 9 February 2024 Serving with Per Bolund (2021–2023); Daniel Helldén (2023–2024)
- Preceded by: Isabella Lövin
- Succeeded by: Amanda Lind

Secretary-General of the Green Party
- In office 4 May 2019 – 31 January 2021
- Preceded by: Marléne Tamlin (acting)

Member of the Riksdag
- In office 26 September 2022 – 7 September 2025

Personal details
- Born: 30 March 1976 (age 50) Lund, Sweden
- Party: Green Party
- Cabinet: Löfven II Cabinet; Löfven III Cabinet

Anna Märta Viktoria Stenevi, née Wallin (born 30 March 1976) is a Swedish former politician for the Green Party. She served as Minister for Gender Equality and as Minister for Housing from February to November 2021, and was co-spokesperson for the Green Party from January 2021 to February 2024.

She served as her party's secretary-general from May 2019 to January 2021. Before becoming secretary-general, she was regional commissioner of Scania County from 2014 to 2016 and municipal commissioner in Malmö Municipality from 2016 to 2019. Prior to that, she was purchasing manager at IMP Nordic and marketing director at book retail chain Bokus.

She was elected as Member of the Riksdag in September 2022.

In October 2023, media outlet Dagens Nyheter interviewed party members in the Green Party who claimed the situation in the party was unbearable due to "toxic leadership".

In May 2025, Stenevi announced that she would be leaving the Riksdag and politics entirely after the summer. She announced her decision along with the release of her autobiography.

She left the Riksdag on 7 September 2025.

== Autobiography ==
Her autobiography, Andas.Överlev (Breathe. Survive) was released in 2025, detailing how her work and circumstances within politics and the Green Party impacted her mental health. She severely criticises the leadership pf the Green Party for not standing behind her and for forcing her to resign due to unfounded claims of bad leadership. After an investigation in the party was opened about Stenevi's leadership, claiming that she has difficulties listening to criticism, the party leadership advised her to resign. According to Stenevi, the investigator (not named in the book) gives her two options, either resign immediately or the investigation will be made public. "If you resign voluntarily, I can one down the criticism of you and make it look like you resigned since you are not feeling well", the investigator said, according to Stenevi.

Party political offices
Preceded by Isabella Lövin	Spokesperson of the Green Party Serving with: Per Bolund (2021–2023); Daniel Helldén (2023–2024); 2021–2024	Succeeded by Amanda Lind
Political offices
Preceded by Åsa Lindhagen	Minister for Gender Equality; 2021	Succeeded by Eva Nordmark
Preceded by Per Bolund	Minister for Housing; 2021	Succeeded by Johan Danielsson
