= Peter Norman (politician) =

Swedish economist and politician (born 1958)

Minister for Financial Markets
- In office 5 October 2010 – 3 October 2014
- Prime Minister: Fredrik Reinfeldt
- Preceded by: Mats Odell
- Succeeded by: Per Bolund

Personal details
- Born: Peter Erik Norman; 3 April 1958 (age 68)
- Party: Moderate Party

Peter Erik Norman (born 3 April 1958) is a Swedish economist who served as minister for financial markets from 2010 to 2014. He has a Bachelor of Arts degree. Formerly a non-partisan at the time of his appointment to the government (a rare occurrence in Sweden) he joined Prime Minister Fredrik Reinfeldt's Moderate Party days later. The last Swedish Minister not to be a member of a political party was Sven Romanus, who served as Minister of Justice from 1976 to 1978.

Norman has worked in the financial industry since 1992. The last ten years, before appointment as minister, he has worked as president of the Seventh AP Fund (Swedish: Sjunde AP-fonden). Prior to joining the AP-Fund in 2000, Norman was the CEO of Alfred Berg Asset Management from 1996 to 1999 and director (deputy director) at the Riksbank from 1994 to 1996.

Norman has previously been chairman of the board of Carnegie Investment Bank and the finance company Max Matthiessen. He is a member of the board of Stockholm University and the investment company Svolder, and was previously vice chairman of the Nuclear Waste Fund.

Following the 2014 defeat, he announced that he would be leaving politics.

Government offices
| Preceded by Mats Odell | Minister for Financial Markets; 2010—2014 | Succeeded by Per Bolund |
