= Per Bolund =

Swedish politician (born 1971)

Per Bolund MP
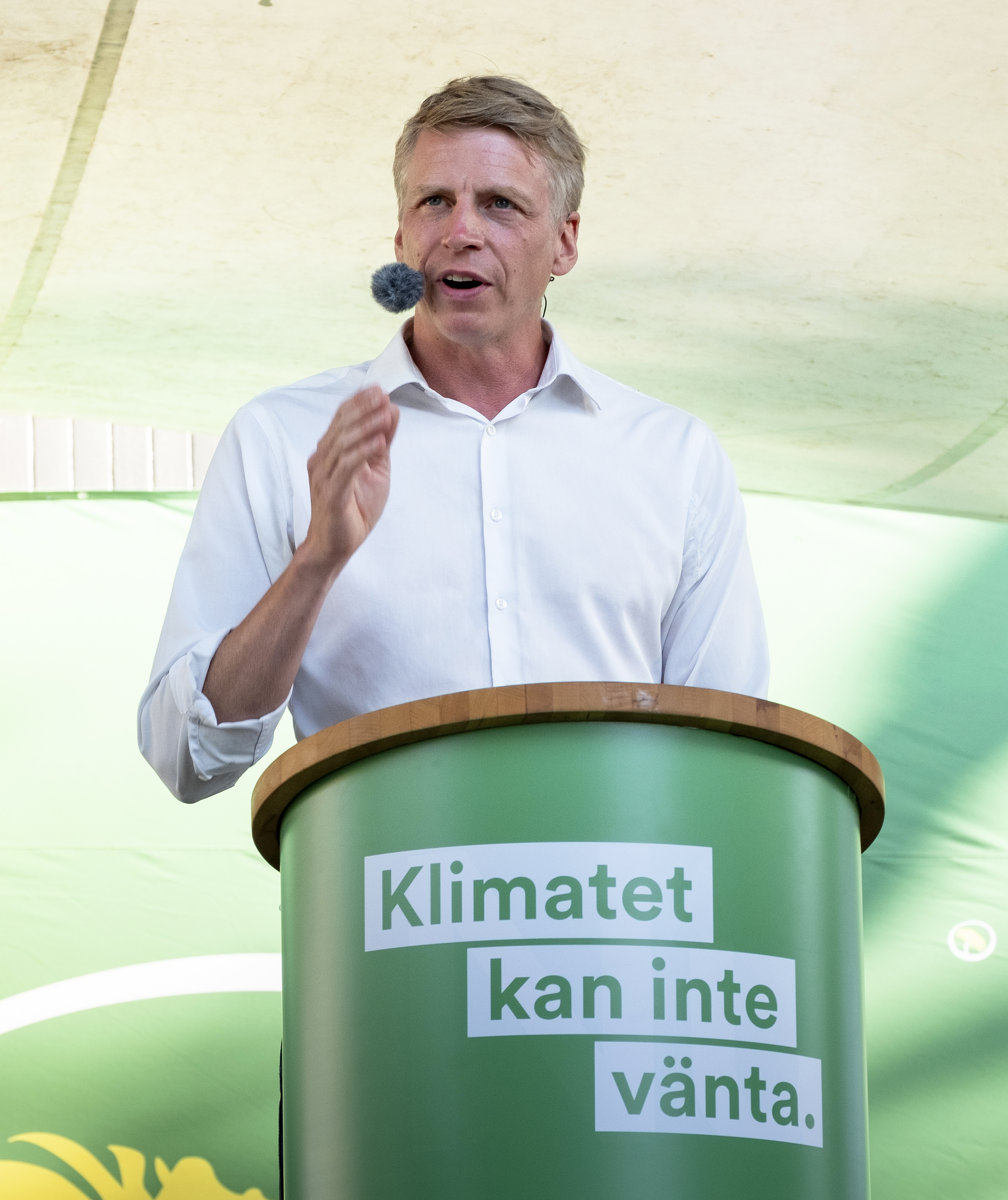
- Per Bolund in June 2019

Deputy Prime Minister of Sweden
- In office 5 February 2021 – 30 November 2021 Serving with Morgan Johansson
- Monarch: Carl XVI Gustaf
- Prime Minister: Stefan Löfven
- Preceded by: Isabella Lövin

Minister for the Environment
- In office 5 February 2021 – 30 November 2021
- Monarch: Carl XVI Gustaf
- Prime Minister: Stefan Löfven
- Preceded by: Isabella Lövin
- Succeeded by: Annika Strandhäll

Spokesperson of the Green Party
- In office 4 May 2019 – 18 November 2023 Serving with Isabella Lövin (2019–2021); Märta Stenevi (2021–2023)
- Preceded by: Gustav Fridolin
- Succeeded by: Daniel Helldén

Minister for Housing
- In office 21 January 2019 – 5 February 2021
- Monarch: Carl XVI Gustaf
- Prime Minister: Stefan Löfven
- Preceded by: Peter Eriksson
- Succeeded by: Märta Stenevi

Minister for Financial Markets
- In office 3 October 2014 – 5 February 2021
- Monarch: Carl XVI Gustaf
- Prime Minister: Stefan Löfven
- Preceded by: Peter Norman
- Succeeded by: Åsa Lindhagen

Minister for Housing and Urban Development (acting)
- In office 18 April 2016 – 25 May 2016
- Monarch: Carl XVI Gustaf
- Prime Minister: Stefan Löfven
- Preceded by: Mehmet Kaplan
- Succeeded by: Peter Eriksson

Member of the Riksdag
- In office 3 October 2006 – 31 December 2023

Personal details
- Born: 3 July 1971 (age 55) Stockholm, Sweden
- Party: Green Party
- Spouse: Åse Ahlstrand
- Children: 3
- Profession: Biologist

Per Bolund (born 3 July 1971) is a Swedish politician for the Green Party. He served as Deputy Prime Minister of Sweden (in a strictly ceremonial role) and as Minister for the Environment from February to November 2021, and was co-spokesperson of the Green Party from May 2019 until his resignation in November 2023.

He previously served as Minister for Financial Markets from October 2014 to February 2021 and as Minister for Housing from January 2019 to February 2021. He was shortly acting Minister for Housing and Urban Development from April to May 2016.

Bolund was elected to the Riksdag in 2006. As Minister for the Environment he made a pledge to double Sweden's climate finance. As leader of the Green Party his withdrawal of support helped bring down the government of Magdalena Andersson in November 2021 because the planned tax cut on petrol in her first budget would lead to higher emissions.

Before politics he trained as a biologist, and his parents are the Aarhus University geneticist Professor Lars Bolund and medical Professor Christina Bolund. In his personal time he is a fan of baseball and football, and follows the Stockholm club AIK Fotboll.

Party political offices
Preceded by Gustav Fridolin	Spokesperson of the Green Party Serving with: Isabella Lövin (2019–2021); Märta Stenevi (2021–2023); 2019–2023	Succeeded by Daniel Helldén
Political offices
Preceded by Peter Norman	Minister for Financial Markets; 2014–2021	Succeeded by Åsa Lindhagen
Preceded by Peter Norman	Deputy Minister for Finance; 2014–2021	Succeeded by Åsa Lindhagen
Preceded by Birgitta Ohlsson	Minister for Consumer Affairs; 2014–2019	Succeeded by Ardalan Shekarabi
Preceded by Mehmet Kaplan	Minister for Housing and Urban Development; Minister for Digitalizion; Acting; 2016	Succeeded by Peter Eriksson
Preceded by Peter Eriksson	Minister for Housing; 2019–2021	Succeeded by Märta Stenevi
Preceded by Isabella Lövin	Minister for the Environment; 2021	Succeeded by Annika Strandhäll
Preceded by Isabella Lövin	Deputy Prime Minister of Sweden (honorary title); 2021	Succeeded by None
