= Åsa Lindhagen =

Swedish politician (born 1980)

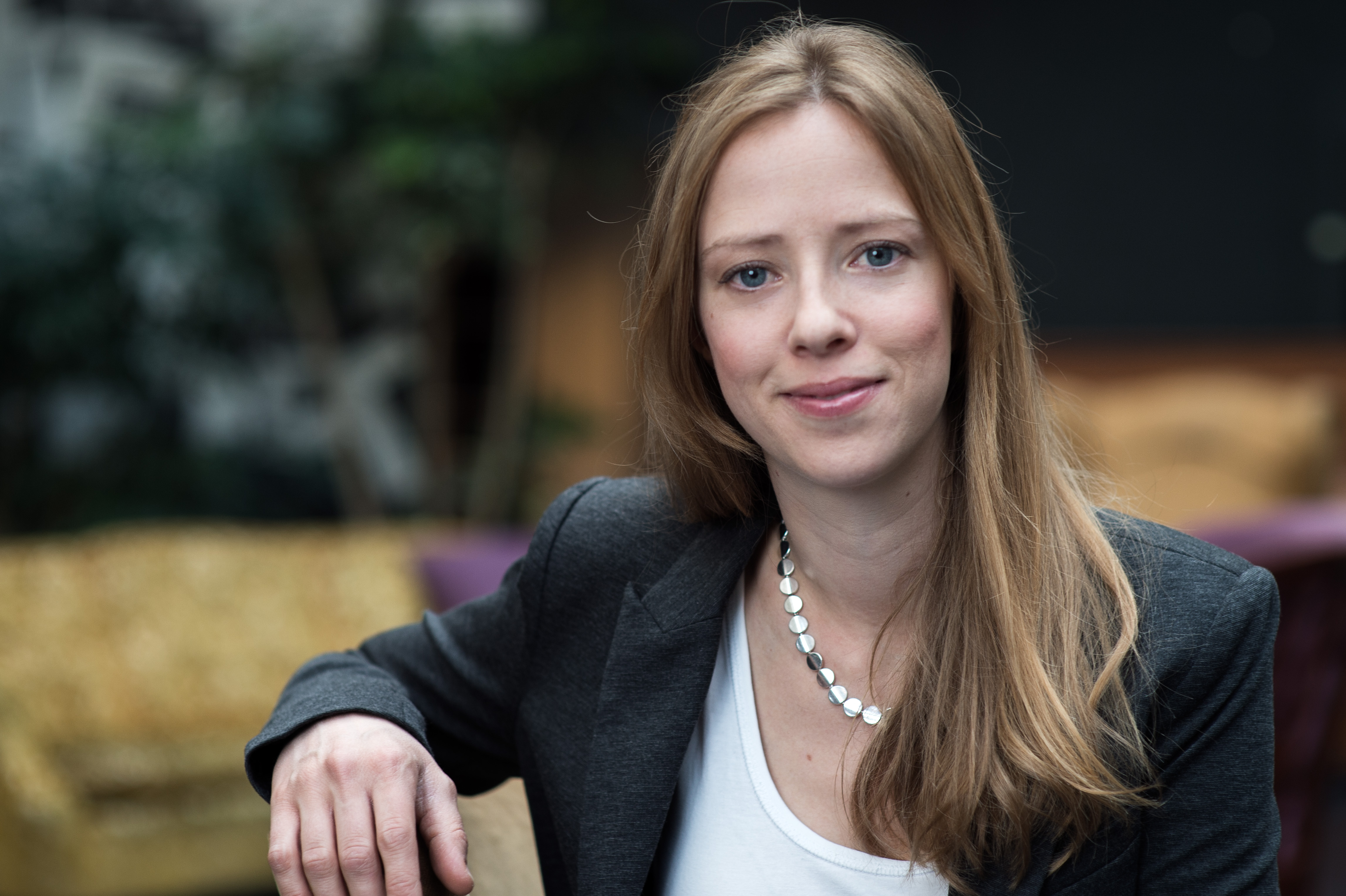

Member of the Riksdag
- In office 29 September 2022 – 18 October 2022
- Constituency: Stockholm Municipality

Minister for Financial Markets
- In office 5 February 2021 – 30 November 2021
- Monarch: Carl XVI Gustaf
- Prime Minister: Stefan Löfven
- Preceded by: Per Bolund
- Succeeded by: Max Elger

Minister for Gender Equality
- In office 21 January 2019 – 5 February 2021
- Monarch: Carl XVI Gustaf
- Prime Minister: Stefan Löfven
- Preceded by: Lena Hallengren
- Succeeded by: Märta Stenevi

Member of the Riksdag
- In office 9 September 2018 – 21 January 2019
- Constituency: Stockholm County

Personal details
- Born: 15 May 1980 (age 46) Norrtälje, Sweden
- Party: Green Party
- Education: Linköping University

Åsa Maria Lindhagen (born 15 May 1980) is a Swedish politician for the Green Party. She served as Minister for Financial Markets from February to November 2021 and previously served as Minister for Gender Equality from 2019 to 2021.

She was a municipal commissioner for the City of Stockholm between 2010 and 2019.

She is openly bisexual.

Political offices
Preceded by Lena Hallengren	Minister for Gender Equality; 2019–2021	Succeeded by Märta Stenevi
Preceded by Per Bolund	Minister for Financial Markets; February – November 2021	Succeeded by Max Elger
Preceded by Per Bolund	Deputy Minister for Finance; February – November 2021	Succeeded by Max Elger
