= Max Elger =

Swedish politician (born 1973)

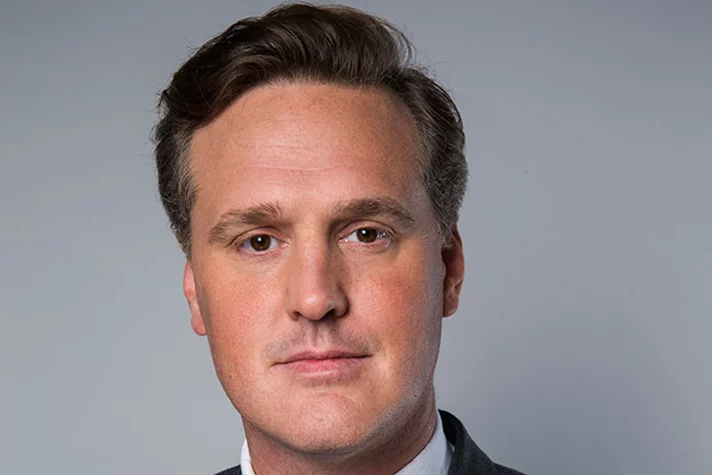

Minister for Financial Markets
- In office 30 November 2021 – 18 October 2022
- Monarch: Carl XVI Gustaf
- Prime Minister: Magdalena Andersson
- Preceded by: Åsa Lindhagen
- Succeeded by: Niklas Wykman

Personal details
- Born: Max Christian Elger; 24 November 1973 (age 52) Stockholm, Sweden
- Party: Social Democrats
- Spouse: Michelle Elger Ekman

Max Christian Elger (born 24 November 1973) is a Swedish politician of the Social Democrats. He served as Minister for Financial Markets in the cabinet of Magdalena Andersson from 2021 to 2022.
