= Marianne Wahlberg =

Swedish politician (1917–2005)

Marianne Wahlberg (1917–2005) was a Swedish politician (Liberals (Sweden)).

She was MP of the Parliament of Sweden in 1979–1982.

She served as Deputy Minister of Budget in 1978–1979.
