= Inger Davidson =

Swedish politician (born 1944)

Inger Margareta Davidson née Windblad (2 December 1944), is a Swedish retired Christian Democrat politician.

He was an Elementary school teacher from 1969 to 1987, party secretary from 1989 to 1991, Minister for Civil Service Affairs from 1991 to 1994 and member of the Riksdag from 1991 to 2010.
