= Minister for Financial Markets (Sweden) =

Swedish cabinet minister

- Finansmarknadsminister
- Lesser coat of arms of Sweden

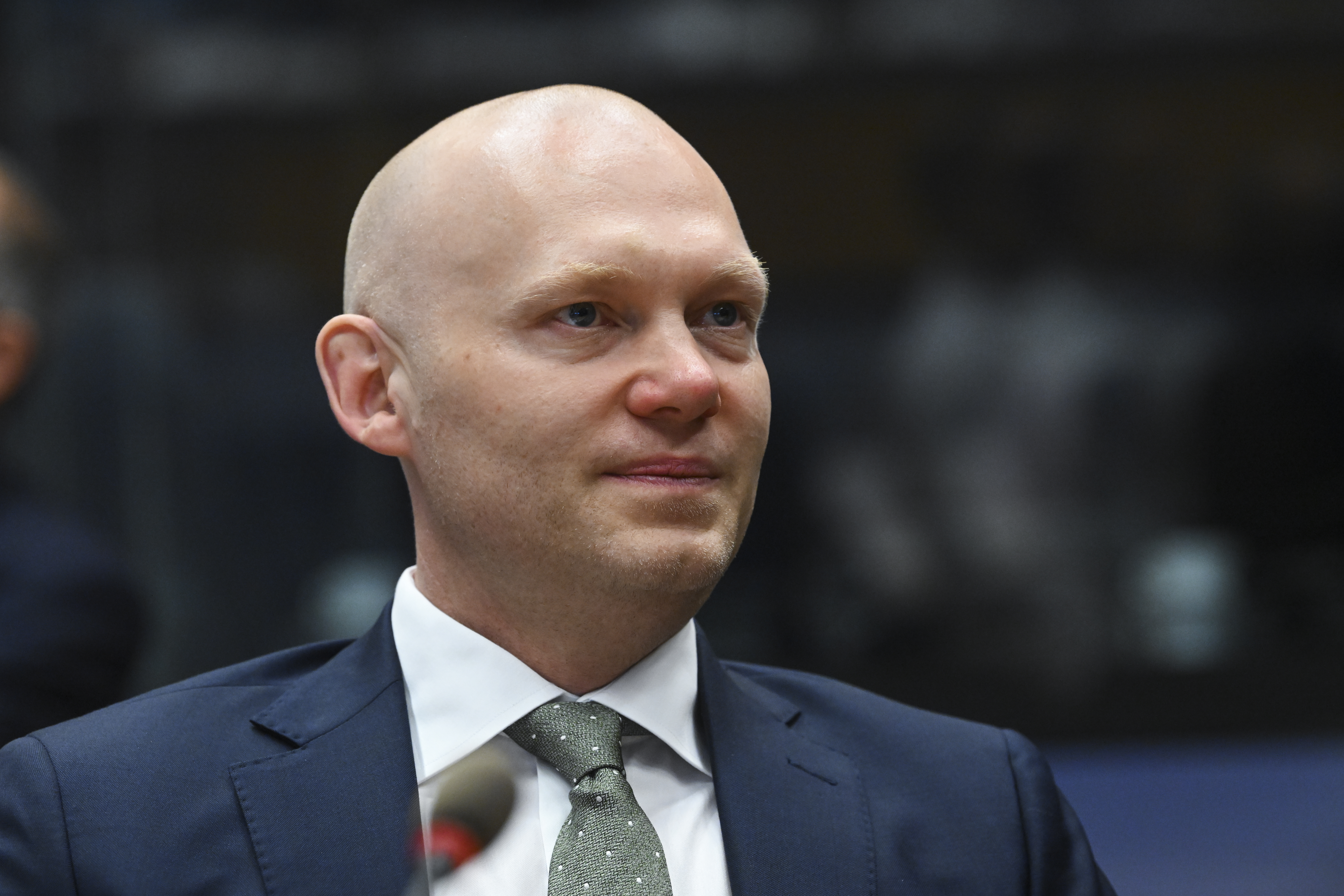
- Incumbent; Niklas Wykman since 18 October 2022
- Appointer: The Prime Minister
- Inaugural holder: Gunnar Lund
- Formation: 21 October 2002
- Website: www.sweden.gov.se

The Minister for Financial Markets (Swedish: finansmarknadsminister) is a cabinet minister within the Swedish Government and appointed by the Prime Minister of Sweden.

The minister is responsible for issues regarding financial markets, municipalities and counties, gambling and state-owned companies. The Minister for Financial Markets is also deputy Minister for Finance. The current Minister for Financial Markets is Niklas Wykman, appointed on 18 October 2022.

== List of ministers for financial markets ==
Name	Term	Political party	Prime Minister
Gunnar Lund	2002–2004	Social Democrats	Göran Persson
Sven-Erik Österberg	2004–2006	Social Democrats	Göran Persson
Mats Odell	2006–2010	Christian Democrats	Fredrik Reinfeldt
Peter Norman	2010–2014	Moderate Party	Fredrik Reinfeldt
Per Bolund	2014–2021	Green Party	Stefan Löfven
Åsa Lindhagen	2021	Green Party	Stefan Löfven
Max Elger	2021–2022	Social Democrats	Magdalena Andersson
Niklas Wykman	2022–	Moderate Party	Ulf Kristersson
