= Mats Odell =

Swedish politician (born 1947)

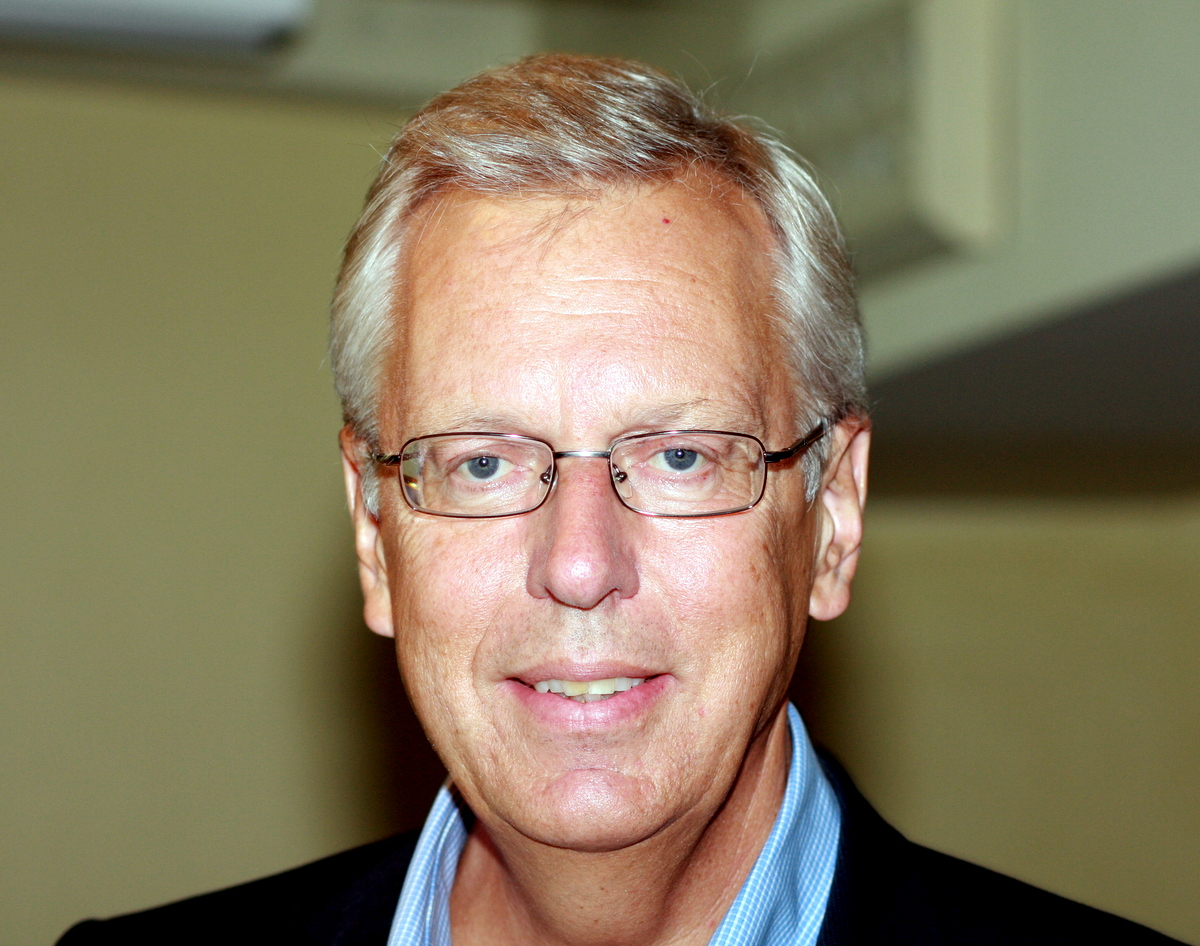

Minister for Financial Markets
- In office 6 October 2006 – 5 October 2010
- Prime Minister: Fredrik Reinfeldt
- Preceded by: Sven-Erik Österberg
- Succeeded by: Peter Norman

Minister of Communications (Transport)
- In office 4 October 1991 – 7 October 1994
- Prime Minister: Carl Bildt
- Preceded by: Georg Andersson
- Succeeded by: Ines Uusmann

Personal details
- Born: Mats Christer Johannes Odell; 30 April 1947 (age 78) Värnamo, Sweden
- Party: Christian Democrat
- Occupation: Economist, politician

Mats Christer Johannes Odell (born 30 April 1947) is a Swedish politician (Christian Democrat). He served as Minister of Communications (Transport) from 1991 to 1994 and as Minister for Financial Markets from 2006 to 2010.

Odell was chairman of the Young Christian Democrats 1975–1981. He is a member of the board of the Christian Democrats since 1988, MP since 1991, and the economics spokesman of the Christian Democrats 1994–2006.

He was parliamentary group leader of his party from 2010 to 2012 and second vice chairman from 2004 to 2012.

Party political offices
Preceded by Alf Svensson	Chairman of the Young Christian Democrats; 1975-1981	Succeeded by Anders Andersson
Political offices
Preceded by Georg Andersson	Minister of Communications (Transport); 1991-1994	Succeeded by Ines Uusmann
Preceded by Sven-Erik Österberg	Minister for Financial Markets; 2006-2010	Succeeded by Peter Norman
