= Minister for Immigration (Sweden) =

Minister for Immigration of Sweden
- Invandrarminister
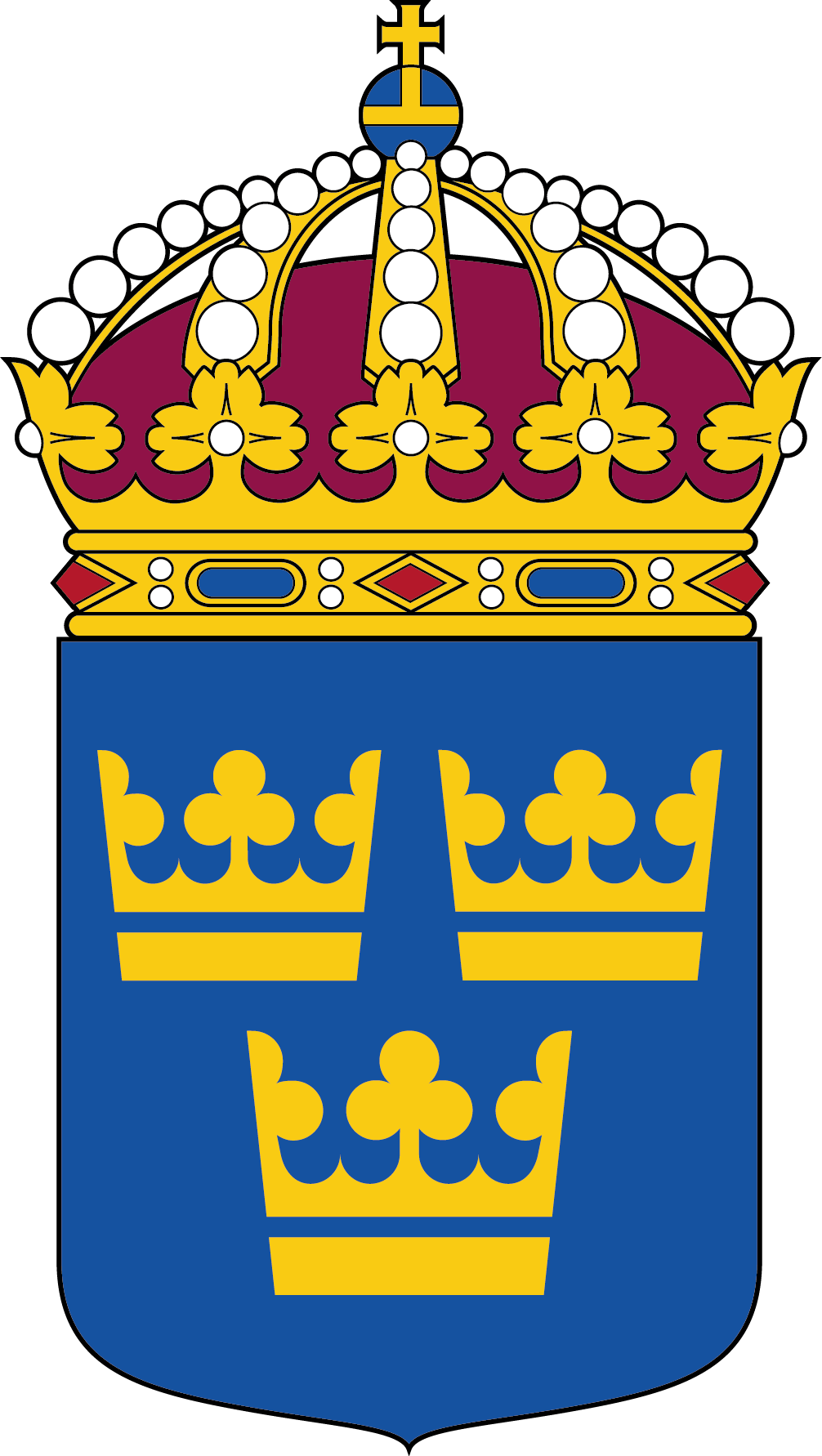
- Lesser coat of arms of Sweden
- Minister without portfolio
- Member of: Government of Sweden
- Appointer: The Prime Minister
- Term length: No fixed term; Serves as long as the Prime Minister sees fit
- Formation: 1954
- First holder: Ulla Lindström
- Final holder: Leif Blomberg
- Abolished: 1996
- Superseded by: Minister for Integration and minister for migration

The Minister for Immigration (Swedish: Invandrarminister) was formerly a commonly used term for the cabinet minister within the Swedish government responsible for immigration and refugee affairs. In 1996, the function was divided between two cabinet ministers: the minister for migration and Refugee Policy and the minister for integration. Subsequently, responsibility for these matters has been moved organizationally between different ministries.

== History ==
The Social Democrat Ulla Lindström became a cabinet minister without portfolio in Prime Minister Tage Erlander's second cabinet on 4 June 1954 and was the first Swedish minister responsible for refugee affairs and certain immigration matters. Her area of responsibility was broad and included, among other things, citizenship, refugee affairs, international aid, and social issues. Citizenship cases largely concerned Baltic refugees and Nordic citizens who wished to settle in Sweden. Although her responsibilities in several respects foreshadowed what would later be handled by ministers for immigration, immigration was not yet a politically prominent or particularly controversial issue. Lindström therefore did not have a distinct "immigration minister" portfolio in the modern sense; rather, these matters formed part of a considerably broader ministerial portfolio.

From 1967 to 1973, Camilla Odhnoff served as minister for family affairs, youth and immigration. From 1973 to 1976, Anna-Greta Leijon served as minister for immigration and gender equality. From 1976 to 1977, Per Ahlmark was responsible for immigration affairs in his capacity as minister for employment and gender equality. From 1976 to 1978, Ola Ullsten served as minister for international development cooperation and also held responsibility for immigration affairs.

In 1978, Rolf Wirtén served as minister for employment, gender equality and immigration. From 1978 to 1979, Eva Winther was minister for immigration and gender equality, followed by Karin Andersson, who held the same portfolios from 1979 to 1982. From 1982 to 1986, Anita Gradin served as minister for immigration and gender equality. From 1986 to 1989, Georg Andersson served solely as minister for immigration. From 1989 to 1991, Maj-Lis Lööw served as minister for immigration and gender equality. From 1991 to 1994, Birgit Friggebo served as minister for culture and immigration, while also serving as minister for gender equality from 1991 to 1993. Finally, from 1994 to 1996, Leif Blomberg served as minister for immigration and labour law.

Since 1996, the position has been divided between a minister for integration and a minister for migration.

== List of officeholders ==
Color key

Independent
Historical parties: Lantmanna Moderate National Party Liberals Liberals Liberals Liberals
Present parties: Social Democrats Moderate Centre Left Liberals Christian Democrats Green Sweden Democrats

=== Cabinet ministers responsible for immigration and refugee affairs ===
Portrait	Minister (Born-Died)	Term			Political Party	Coalition	Cabinet
Portrait	Minister (Born-Died)	Took office	Left office	Duration	Political Party	Coalition	Cabinet
Ulla Lindström	Ulla Lindström (1909–1999)	4 June 1954	28 December 1966	12 years, 207 days	Social Democrats	–	Erlander II; Erlander III
Camilla Odhnoff	Camilla Odhnoff (1928–2013)	9 January 1967	3 November 1973	6 years, 298 days	Social Democrats	–	Erlander III; Palme I
Anna-Greta Leijon	Anna-Greta Leijon (1939–2024)	3 November 1973	8 October 1976	2 years, 340 days	Social Democrats	–	Palme I
Per Ahlmark	Per Ahlmark (1939–2018)	8 October 1976	11 January 1977	95 days	Liberals	C–M–L	Fälldin I
Ola Ullsten	Ola Ullsten (1931–2018)	11 January 1977	7 March 1978	1 year, 55 days	Liberals	C–M–L	Fälldin I
Rolf Wirtén	Rolf Wirtén (1931–2023)	7 March 1978	18 October 1978	225 days	Liberals	C–M–L	Fälldin I
Eva Winther	Eva Winther (1921–2014)	18 October 1978	12 October 1979	359 days	Liberals	–	Ullsten
Karin Andersson	Karin Andersson (1918–2012)	12 October 1979	8 October 1982	2 years, 361 days	Centre	C–M–L	Fälldin II; Fälldin III
Anita Gradin	Anita Gradin (1933–2022)	8 October 1982	9 October 1986	4 years, 1 day	Social Democrats	–	Palme II; Carlsson I
Georg Andersson	Georg Andersson (born 1936)	10 October 1986	29 January 1989	2 years, 111 days	Social Democrats	–	Carlsson I
Maj-Lis Lööw	Maj-Lis Lööw (born 1936)	30 January 1989	4 October 1991	2 years, 247 days	Social Democrats	–	Carlsson I Carlsson II
Birgit Friggebo	Birgit Friggebo (born 1941)	1 December 1991	7 October 1994	2 years, 310 days	Liberals	C–M–L–KD	Bildt
Leif Blomberg	Leif Blomberg (1941–1998)	6 October 1994	22 March 1996	1 year, 168 days	Social Democrats	–	Carlsson III

== See also ==
- Minister for Integration
- Minister for Migration
