= Minister for Employment (Sweden) =

Swedish cabinet position

- Arbetsmarknadsminister
- Lesser coat of arms of Sweden

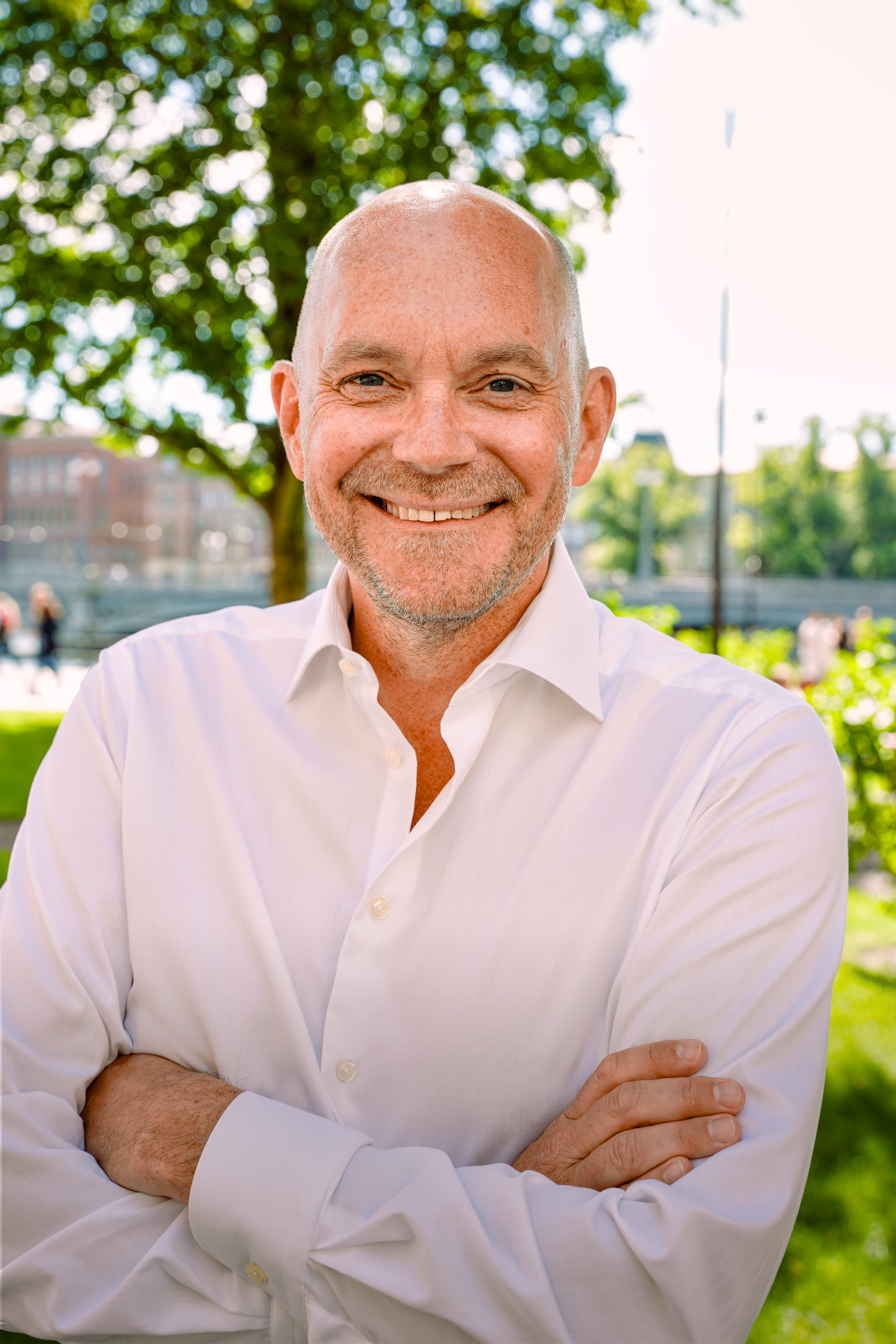
- Incumbent; Johan Britz since 28 June 2025
- Ministry of Employment
- Member of: The Government
- Appointer: The Prime Minister
- Term length: Serves at the pleasure of the Prime Minister
- Inaugural holder: Ingemund Bengtsson
- Formation: 1974
- Website: www.regeringen.se/sveriges-regering/arbetsmarknadsdepartementet/johan-pehrson/

The Minister for Employment (Swedish: Arbetsmarknadsminister) is a member of the Government of Sweden and is the head of the Ministry of Employment.

== History ==
The position was introduced in 1974 during Palme I cabinet and abolished in 1998 under the Persson cabinet, when the responsibilities were transferred to the Ministry of Industry, Employment and Communications, where from 1998 to 2002, the deputy minister for industry, employment and communications and from 2002 to 2006, the minister for employment were ministers responsible for the issues. When the Reinfeldt cabinet took office in 2006, the position was reinstated.

== List of officeholders ==
Color key

Independent
Historical parties: Lantmanna Moderate National Party Liberals Liberals Liberals Liberals
Present parties: Social Democrats Moderate Centre Left Liberals Christian Democrats Green Sweden Democrats

=== 1974–1998 ===
Portrait	Minister (Born-Died)	Term			Political Party	Coalition	Cabinet
Portrait	Minister (Born-Died)	Took office	Left office	Duration	Political Party	Coalition	Cabinet
Ingemund Bengtsson	Ingemund Bengtsson (1919–2000)	1 January 1974	8 October 1976	2 years, 281 days	Social Democrats	–	Palme I
Per Ahlmark	Per Ahlmark (1939–2018)	8 October 1976	7 March 1978	1 year, 211 days	Liberals	C–M–L	Fälldin I
Rolf Wirtén	Rolf Wirtén (1931–2023)	7 March 1978	31 July 1980	2 years, 146 days	Liberals	– C–M–L	Ullsten; Fälldin II
Ingemar Eliasson	Ingemar Eliasson (born 1939)	31 July 1980	8 October 1982	2 years, 69 days	Liberals	C–L	Fälldin III
Anna-Greta Leijon	Anna-Greta Leijon (1939–2024)	8 October 1982	19 October 1987	5 years, 11 days	Social Democrats	–	Palme II; Carlsson I
Ingela Thalén	Ingela Thalén (born 1943)	19 October 1987	11 January 1990	2 years, 84 days	Social Democrats	–	Carlsson I
Mona Sahlin	Mona Sahlin (born 1957)	11 January 1990	4 October 1991	1 year, 266 days	Social Democrats	–	Carlsson II
Börje Hörnlund	Börje Hörnlund (born 1935)	4 October 1991	7 October 1994	3 years, 3 days	Centre	M–C–L–KD	Bildt
Anders Sundström	Anders Sundström (born 1952)	7 October 1994	22 March 1996	1 year, 167 days	Social Democrats	–	Carlsson III
Margareta Winberg	Margareta Winberg (born 1947)	22 March 1996	6 October 1998	2 years, 198 days	Social Democrats	–	Persson
Björn Rosengren	Björn Rosengren (born 1942)	6 October 1998	31 October 1998	25 days	Social Democrats	–	Persson
=== Minister responsible for labor issues 1998–2006 ===
Portrait	Minister (Born-Died)	Term			Political Party	Coalition	Cabinet
Portrait	Minister (Born-Died)	Took office	Left office	Duration	Political Party	Coalition	Cabinet
Mona Sahlin	Mona Sahlin (born 1957)	6 October 1998	21 October 2002	4 years, 15 days	Social Democrats	–	Persson
Hans Karlsson	Hans Karlsson (born 1946)	21 October 2002	6 October 2006	3 years, 350 days	Social Democrats	–	Persson
=== 2006–present ===
Portrait	Minister (Born-Died)	Term			Political Party	Coalition	Cabinet
Portrait	Minister (Born-Died)	Took office	Left office	Duration	Political Party	Coalition	Cabinet
Sven Otto Littorin	Sven Otto Littorin (born 1966)	6 October 2006	7 July 2010	3 years, 274 days	Moderate	M–C–L–KD	Reinfeldt
Tobias Billström	Tobias Billström (born 1973); Acting	7 July 2010	5 October 2010	90 days	Moderate	M–C–L–KD	Reinfeldt
Hillevi Engström	Hillevi Engström (born 1963)	5 October 2010	17 September 2013	2 years, 347 days	Moderate	M–C–L–KD	Reinfeldt
Elisabeth Svantesson	Elisabeth Svantesson (born 1967)	17 September 2013	3 October 2014	1 year, 16 days	Moderate	M–C–L–KD	Reinfeldt
Ylva Johansson	Ylva Johansson (born 1964)	3 October 2014	10 September 2019	4 years, 342 days	Social Democrats	S–MP	Löfven I Löfven II
Eva Nordmark	Eva Nordmark (born 1971)	10 September 2019	18 October 2022	3 years, 38 days	Social Democrats	S–MP; S–MP; S	Löfven II; Löfven III; Andersson
Johan Pehrson	Johan Pehrson (born 1968)	18 October 2022	10 September 2024	1 year, 328 days	Liberals	M–L–KD	Kristersson
Mats Persson	Mats Persson (born 1980)	10 September 2024	28 June 2025	291 days	Liberals	M–L–KD	Kristersson
Johan Britz	Johan Britz (born 1975)	28 June 2025	Incumbent	1 year, 71 days	Liberals	M–L–KD	Kristersson

== Other ministers in the Ministry of Employment ==
In addition to the head of the ministry, the Ministry of Employment has at times also housed additional deputy ministers responsible for various areas such as immigration, gender equality, labor law, youth affairs, etc. These ministerial titles varied, and most often covered only a part of the minister's responsibilities, usually the dominant area of focus. For example, Anna-Greta Leijon served not only as the minister for immigration but also held responsibility for labor law issues and matters concerning disabled individuals in the workplace. Karin Andersson, as the deputy minister of employment, was responsible for gender equality and immigration issues, a combination that has recurred in later times.

In the 2019 government, the minister associated with the Ministry of Employment, in addition to the minister of employment, held the title of minister for gender equality/minister responsible for combating discrimination and segregation.

Before the establishment of the Ministry of Employment, many matters were handled within the Ministry of the Interior, where individuals such as Camilla Odhnoff were responsible for immigration and family affairs, including gender equality.

Name	Period	Party	Title
Anna-Greta Leijon (1939–2024)	1 January 1974 – 8 October 1976	Social Democratic Party	Minister of immigration and minister for gender equality
Eva Winther (1921–2014)	18 October 1978 – 12 October 1979	Liberal People's Party	Minister of immigration and minister for gender equality
Karin Andersson (1918–2012)	12 October 1979 – 8 October 1982	Centre Party	Minister of immigration and minister for gender equality
Anita Gradin (1933–2022)	8 October 1982 – 9 October 1986	Social Democratic Party	Minister of immigration and minister for gender equality
Georg Andersson (born 1936)	9 October 1986 – 29 January 1989	Social Democratic Party	Minister of immigration
Maj-Lis Lööw (born 1936)	29 January 1989 – 7 October 1991	Social Democratic Party	Minister of immigration and minister for gender equality
Leif Blomberg (1941–1998)	7 October 1994 – 22 March 1996	Social Democratic Party	Minister of immigration
Ulrica Messing (born 1968)	22 March 1996 – 6 October 1998	Social Democratic Party	Minister for labour law and minister for gender equality
Erik Ullenhag (born 1972)	5 October 2010 – 3 October 2014	Liberal People's Party	Minister for integration
Åsa Lindhagen (born 1980)	21 January 2019 – 5 February 2021	Green Party	minister for gender equality
Märta Stenevi (born 1976)	5 February – 30 November 2021	Green Party	Minister for gender equality and minister for housing
Eva Nordmark (born 1971)	10 September 2019 – 18 October 2022	Social Democratic Party	Minister for employment and minister for gender equality
Johan Danielsson (born 1982)	30 November 2021 – 18 October 2022	Social Democratic Party	Minister for housing and deputy minister for employment
Paulina Brandberg (born 1983)	18 October 2022 – 1 April 2025	Liberals	Minister for gender equality and deputy minister for employment
Nina Larsson (born 1976)	1 April 2025 –	Liberals	Minister for gender equality
