= Carlsson I cabinet =

Cabinet of Sweden (1986–1990)

Carlsson's First cabinet
- 47th Cabinet of Sweden

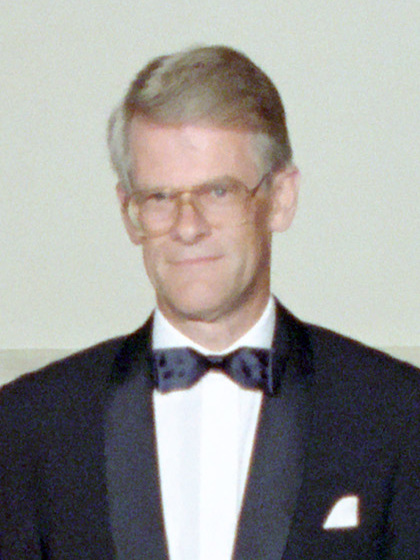
- Prime Minister Ingvar Carlsson
- Date formed: 12 March 1986
- Date dissolved: 27 February 1990

People and organisations
- Monarch: Carl XVI Gustaf
- Prime Minister: Ingvar Carlsson
- Member party: Social Democrats
- Status in legislature: Single-party minority with flexible support from Left Party – the Communists
- Opposition parties: Moderate Party; People's Party; Centre Party; Green Party (from 1988)
- Opposition leader: Ulf Adelsohn (M; 1986); Carl Bildt (M; 1986–1990)

History
- Incoming formation: Assassination of Olof Palme
- Outgoing formation: Failure of financial proposals
- Election: 1988 election
- Legislature terms: 1985–1988; 1988–1991
- Predecessor: Palme II
- Successor: Carlsson II

The Carlsson I cabinet (Swedish: regeringen Carlsson I) was the government of Sweden from 12 March 1986 to 27 February 1990. It was a Social Democratic single-party minority government led by Prime Minister Ingvar Carlsson. The cabinet was formed as a direct consequence of the assassination of incumbent Prime Minister Olof Palme on 28 February 1986, after which the Speaker of the Parliament, Ingemund Bengtsson, in accordance with the Constitution of Sweden discharged all ministers.

In the course of the first cabinet of Ingvar Carlsson, Sweden – as well as most other western countries in the late 1980s – enjoyed a period of economic expansion. The cabinet undertook a reform of the Swedish tax system, which meant that more income tax went directly to the municipalities, instead of the state. The reform also meant that a flat capital gains tax was implemented. During these years Sweden saw two widely publicised political scandals: the Ebbe Carlsson affair and the Bofors scandal.

== Formation ==
After the assassination of Prime Minister Olof Palme on 28 February 1986, the Palme II cabinet continued to serve as an interim cabinet (Swedish: expeditionsregering) led by Deputy Prime Minister Ingvar Carlsson until 12 March 1986. The Carlsson I cabinet acceded formally that day, after Carlsson had been elected prime minister by the parliament with 178 votes for and 0 against. 159 members refrained from voting, and 12 were not present.

== Ministers ==
Apart from the new prime minister, the Carlsson I cabinet was almost identical with the previous Palme II cabinet. However the Minister for Energy Affairs, also acceded Carlsson's former office as Minister of the Environment.

Portfolio	Minister	Took office	Left office	Party
Prime Minister	Ingvar Carlsson	12 March 1986	27 February 1990	Social Democrats
Minister for Foreign Affairs	Sten Andersson	12 March 1986	27 February 1990	Social Democrats
Minister for Finance	Kjell-Olof Feldt	12 March 1986	16 February 1990	Social Democrats
Minister for Finance	Odd Engström	16 February 1990	27 February 1990	Social Democrats
Minister for Education	Lennart Bodström	12 March 1986	29 January 1989	Social Democrats
Minister for Education	Bengt Göransson	29 January 1989	27 February 1990	Social Democrats
Minister for Justice	Sten Wickbom	12 March 1986	19 October 1987	Social Democrats
Minister for Justice	Anna-Greta Leijon	19 October 1987	7 June 1988	Social Democrats
Minister for Justice	Thage G. Peterson	7 June 1988	30 September 1988	Social Democrats
Minister for Justice	Ingvar Carlsson (acting)	30 September 1988	4 October 1988	Social Democrats
Minister for Justice	Laila Freivalds	4 October 1988	27 February 1990	Social Democrats
Minister for Health and Social Affairs	Gertrud Sigurdsen	12 March 1986	29 January 1989	Social Democrats
Minister for Health and Social Affairs	Sven Hulterström	29 January 1989	11 January 1990	Social Democrats
Minister for Health and Social Affairs	Ingela Thalén	11 January 1990	27 February 1990	Social Democrats
Minister for Employment	Anna-Greta Leijon	12 March 1986	19 October 1987	Social Democrats
Minister for Employment	Ingela Thalén	19 October 1987	11 January 1990	Social Democrats
Minister for Employment	Mona Sahlin	11 January 1990	27 February 1990	Social Democrats
Minister for Agriculture	Svante Lundkvist	12 March 1986	10 October 1986	Social Democrats
Minister for Agriculture	Mats Hellström	10 October 1986	27 February 1990	Social Democrats
Minister for Defence	Roine Carlsson	12 March 1986	27 February 1990	Social Democrats
Minister for Communications	Sven Hulterström	12 March 1986	29 January 1989	Social Democrats
Minister for Communications	Georg Andersson	29 January 1989	27 February 1990	Social Democrats
Minister for Civil Service Affairs	Bo Holmberg	12 March 1986	4 October 1988	Social Democrats
Minister for Civil Service Affairs	Bengt K. Å. Johansson	4 October 1988	27 February 1990	Social Democrats
Minister for Housing	Hans Gustafsson	12 March 1986	4 October 1988	Social Democrats
Minister for Housing	Ulf Lönnqvist	4 October 1988	27 February 1990	Social Democrats
Minister for the Environment and Energy	Birgitta Dahl	12 March 1986	27 February 1990	Social Democrats
Minister for Enterprise	Thage G. Peterson	12 March 1986	30 September 1988	Social Democrats
Minister for Enterprise	Ingvar Carlsson (acting)	30 September 1988	4 October 1988	Social Democrats
Minister for Enterprise	Ivar Nordberg	4 October 1988	11 January 1990	Social Democrats
Minister for Enterprise	Rune Molin	11 January 1990	27 February 1990	Social Democrats
Ministers without portfolio
Sports, Tourism and Youth	Ulf Lönnqvist	10 October 1986	4 October 1988	Social Democrats
Minister for Schools	Bengt Göransson	12 March 1986	29 January 1989	Social Democrats
Minister for Schools	Göran Persson	29 January 1989	27 February 1990	Social Democrats
Minister for Culture	Bengt Göransson	12 March 1986	29 February 1990	Social Democrats
Minister for Foreign Trade	Mats Hellström	12 March 1986	10 October 1986	Social Democrats
Minister for Foreign Trade	Anita Gradin	10 October 1986	27 February 1990	Social Democrats
Minister for Nordic Cooperation	Svante Lundqvist	12 March 1986	10 October 1986	Social Democrats
Minister for Nordic Cooperation	Ulf Lönnqvist	10 October 1986	4 October 1988	Social Democrats
Minister for Nordic Cooperation	Mats Hellström	4 October 1988	27 February 1990	Social Democrats
Salaries and Consumer	Bengt K. Å. Johansson	12 March 1986	4 October 1988	Social Democrats
Consumer and Youth	Margot Wallström	4 October 1988	27 February 1990	Social Democrats
Budget	Odd Engström	12 March 1986	16 February 1990	Social Democrats
International Development Cooperation	Lena Hjelm-Wallén	12 March 1986	27 February 1990	Social Democrats
Family and Disabled	Bengt Lindqvist	12 March 1986	27 February 1990	Social Democrats
Equality	Anita Gradin	12 March 1986	10 October 1986	Social Democrats
Equality	Anna-Greta Leijon	10 October 1986	19 October 1987	Social Democrats
Equality	Ingela Thalén	19 October 1987	29 January 1989	Social Democrats
Equality	Maj-Lis Lööw	29 January 1989	27 February 1990	Social Democrats
Migration	Anita Gradin	12 March 1986	10 October 1986	Social Democrats
Migration	Georg Andersson	10 October 1986	29 January 1989	Social Democrats
Migration	Maj-Lis Lööw	29 January 1989	27 February 1990	Social Democrats
Church	Bo Holmberg	12 March 1986	4 October 1988	Social Democrats
Church	Margot Wallström	4 October 1988	27 February 1990	Social Democrats

== Politics ==
=== Foreign affairs ===
Between 14 and 17 April 1986 the Prime Minister made a visit to Moscow. The purpose of the visit was to discuss the ongoing border dispute between Sweden and Soviet in the Baltic Sea. The exact stretch of the border had been a matter of disagreement since the late 1960s. Both parties wanted to draw the border through the middle of the Baltic Sea, however they did not agree on what constituted the middle. They disputed area consisted of 13 500 km².

Sweden wanted to draw the border in a middle, calculated between Gotland and the Baltic states, while Soviet wanted to the count from the Swedish mainland. The Soviet proposal would have meant a borderline stretching just east of Gotland.

In January 1988, the Premier of the Soviet Union, Nikolai Ryzhkov made an official visit to Stockholm. Among the issues discussed was the border dispute. It was decided that Sweden were to be given seventy-five percents of the disputed area, while the Soviet Union received the remaining twenty-five percents. Furthermore, the two parties agree on a transition of fishing regulations for the coming twenty years.

In the middle of 1986 a debate concerning whether or not Sweden should implement a complete trade embargo towards apartheid South Africa emerged. Denmark and Norway had already announced that they intended to implement an embargo. The Centre Party, the Liberal People's Party, the Social Democratic Youth League, the league of Social Democratic Women in Sweden and the Swedish Association of Christian Social Democrats had all announced their support of an embargo.

Import of agricultural products had already been prohibited on 1 January 1986. The Prime Minister, however, wanted to wait on the decision of the United Nations Security Council. On 12 March 1987 the decision to implement a complete trade embargo towards South Africa and Namibia, starting on 1 July the same year, was taken.

In May 1988, Carlsson traveled to the capitols of several of the member states of the European Economic Community (EEC). The Prime Minister visited Madrid, Brussels, Bonn and London. The purpose of the visits was to explain Sweden's attitude towards the EEC. Carlsson line was that Sweden was to collaborate with the EEC in all areas except, foreign policy, where Sweden's policy of neutrality hindered it from participate. Therefore, Sweden could not become a member of the EEC.

Early in 1988 the Minister of Foreign Affairs Sten Andersson visited Syria, Jordan and Israel. On 6 December 1988 the chairman of the Palestine Liberation Organization Yasser Arafat visited Sweden on an official state visit to Stockholm. During his visit, Arafat acknowledge Israel's right to exist and condemned terror as a weapon.

In November the following year Sten Andersson visited the Baltic states, where he declared that the Baltic states were not occupied by the Soviet Union. For this statement Andersson received severe criticism in Sweden. In his memoirs the minister defends his statement, writing that the Baltic states were annexed which, according to Public international law, is not the same thing as occupation.

=== Energy and environment policy ===
Shortly before Christmas 1985, the Minister of the Environment and Energy Affairs Birgitta Dahl, pledged to present a plan to phase out nuclear power in Sweden by 1995. After the 1986 Chernobyl accident in Ukraine, an expert committee was formed by the government. The committee was to investigate the security of nuclear energy. To form a broad consensus regarding the future of nuclear energy in Sweden, the cabinet invited the other political parties for discussion. On 12 February 1987 the discussions failed. The following day Dahl announced that the government intended to start the phase out between 1990 and 1997. In the beginning of 1987 they presented a Motion (parliamentary procedure) to close the first nuclear reactor sometime in the period 1993–1995 and the second during 1994–1996.

In 1988 the Moderate Party proposed a national Carbon dioxide limit, which meant that nuclear power plants could not be replaced by fossil fuel power plants. The same year the cabinet revised their nuclear proposition; now the first reactor was to be closed by 1995, and the second by 1996. The plants where reactors were to be closed were Barsebäck and Ringhals. Dahl declared that the decision was "irreversible." But after debates in parliament the Liberal People's Party and the Centre Party, together with members of the social democratic party, reverted the decision in 1991.

=== Social policy ===
During February 1986 the cabinet held negotiations about with the conservative opposition about social policy. The Social Democratic Party wanted to raise child allowances and extend parental allowance. By 28 February the Moderate Party, the Centre Party, and the Liberal People's Party had left the negotiations. The Centre Party later returned to negotiations, and with support from them and the Left Party the proposition passed. The new law meant that child allowance was raised from 400 SEK/month to 485 SEK/month.

== 1988 general election ==
Before the general election in 1988, the three non-socialist parties (the Moderate Party, the People's Party, and the Centre Party) agreed on a proposal to implement a taxed health care allowance on 15 000 SEK per child and year. Cost of childcare up to the same amount would be deductible in the declaration. In total the proposal would have costed 8 billion Swedish crowns. The Social Democrats instead wanted to extend parental allowance during a period of three years, from nine to eight months. The Social Democrats' proposal were to cost 5.5 billions.

The Social Democrats lost three seats in the election. The Left Party – the Communists gained one seat. The Green Party passed the election threshold for the first time, receiving 5.5 percent of the votes and thus twenty seats in parliament. The three non-socialist parties together lost 19 seats.

== Controversies ==
Several widely publicised political scandals took place during 1987. In March the Indian newspapers the Indian Express and The Hindu accused the then Indian Prime Minister Rajiv Gandhi and several others of receiving kickbacks from the Swedish weapons producer Bofors for winning a bid to supply India's 155 mm field howitzer. The scale of the corruption was far worse than any that India had seen before, and directly led to the defeat of Gandhi's ruling Indian National Congress party in the November 1989 general elections. The affair became known as the Bofors scandal.

During the night between 5 and 6 October 1987 Stig Bergling, a former officer in the Swedish Security Service who had been convicted of espionage on behalf of the Soviet Union, managed to escape while on furlough. After receiving heavy criticism, the Minister of Justice Sten Wickbom resigned on 19 October. During the year the much troubled police investigation of the assassination of Olof Palme lingered on. Due to failure to present results the Stockholm county administrative chief of police Hans Holmér was forced to resign.

On 1 June 1988 the Ebbe Carlsson affair started, when the newspaper Expressen revealed that the publisher Ebbe Carlsson had been given access to top secret documents concerning the Palme investigation. The new Minister of Justice Anna-Greta Leijon, who had authorised Ebbe Carlsson's involvement in the investigation, resigned on 7 June.

== See also ==
- 1990–1994 Swedish financial crisis

Preceded by Palme II cabinet	Cabinet of Sweden; 1986–1990	Succeeded by Carlsson II cabinet
