= Carlsson II cabinet =

Government of Sweden from 1990 to 1991

Carlsson's Second Cabinet
- 48th Cabinet of Sweden

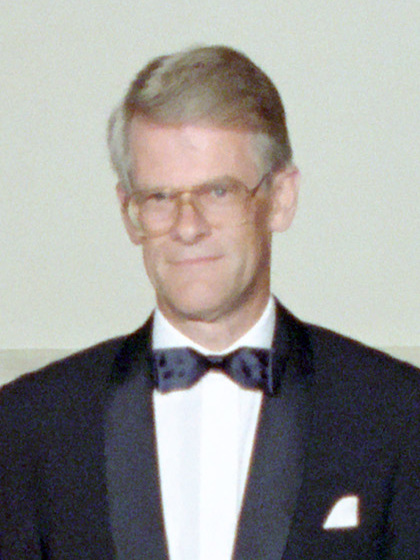
- Prime Minister Ingvar Carlsson
- Date formed: 27 February 1990
- Date dissolved: 4 October 1991

People and organisations
- Monarch: Carl XVI Gustaf
- Prime Minister: Ingvar Carlsson
- Member party: Social Democrats
- Status in legislature: Single-party minority with flexible support from Left Party – the Communists
- Opposition parties: Moderate Party; People's Party; Centre Party; Green Party
- Opposition leader: Carl Bildt (M)

History
- Incoming formation: Failure of financial proposals
- Outgoing formation: 1991 election
- Election: 1991 election
- Legislature term: 1988–1991
- Predecessor: Carlsson I
- Successor: Carl Bildt

The Carlsson II cabinet (Swedish: regeringen Carlsson II) was the government of Sweden from 27 February 1990 to 4 October 1991. It was a Social Democratic single-party minority government led by Prime Minister Ingvar Carlsson.

The previous Carlsson I cabinet resigned due to its economic emergency package being voted down in the Riksdag (Swedish parliament). In the absence of a non-socialist alternative cabinet, Carlsson was re-elected as prime minister and formed this new cabinet. The need for an emergency package was still left when this second cabinet assumed office on 27 February 1990. On 5 April, the cabinet made up an emergency package with the People's Party. The cabinet resigned following a defeat in the 1991 general election and was succeeded by the centre-right Carl Bildt cabinet.

== Ministers ==
Portfolio	Minister	Took office	Left office	Party
Prime Minister	Ingvar Carlsson	27 February 1990	4 October 1991	Social Democrats
Deputy Prime Minister	Odd Engström	27 February 1990	4 October 1991	Social Democrats
Minister for Foreign Affairs	Sten Andersson	27 February 1990	4 October 1991	Social Democrats
Minister for Finance	Allan Larsson	27 February 1990	4 October 1991	Social Democrats
Minister for Education	Bengt Göransson	27 February 1990	4 October 1991	Social Democrats
Minister for Justice	Laila Freivalds	27 February 1990	4 October 1991	Social Democrats
Minister for Health and Social Affairs	Ingela Thalén	27 February 1990	4 October 1991	Social Democrats
Minister for Employment	Mona Sahlin	27 February 1990	4 October 1991	Social Democrats
Minister for Agriculture	Mats Hellström	27 February 1990	4 October 1991	Social Democrats
Minister for Defence	Roine Carlsson	27 February 1990	4 October 1991	Social Democrats
Minister for Communications	Georg Andersson	27 February 1990	4 October 1991	Social Democrats
Minister for Civil Service Affairs	Bengt K. Å. Johansson	27 February 1990	4 October 1991	Social Democrats
Minister for Housing	Ulf Lönnqvist	27 February 1990	4 October 1991	Social Democrats
Minister for the Environment	Birgitta Dahl	27 February 1990	4 October 1991	Social Democrats
Minister for Enterprise	Rune Molin	27 February 1990	4 October 1991	Social Democrats
Ministers without portfolio
Taxes	Erik Åsbrink	27 February 1990	4 October 1991	Social Democrats
Minister for International Development Cooperation	Lena Hjelm-Wallén	27 February 1990	4 October 1991	Social Democrats
Minister of Foreign Trade	Anita Gradin	27 February 1990	4 October 1991	Social Democrats
Social Security	Bengt Lindqvist	27 February 1990	4 October 1991	Social Democrats
Minister for Schools	Göran Persson	27 February 1990	4 October 1991	Social Democrats
Migration	Maj-Lis Lööw	27 February 1990	4 October 1991	Social Democrats
Consumer and Youth	Margot Wallström	27 February 1990	4 October 1991	Social Democrats

== See also ==
- 1990–1994 Swedish financial crisis

Preceded by Carlsson I cabinet	Cabinet of Sweden; 1990–1991	Succeeded by Carl Bildt cabinet
