= Persson cabinet =

Swedish government cabinet

Persson's Cabinet
- 51st Cabinet of Sweden

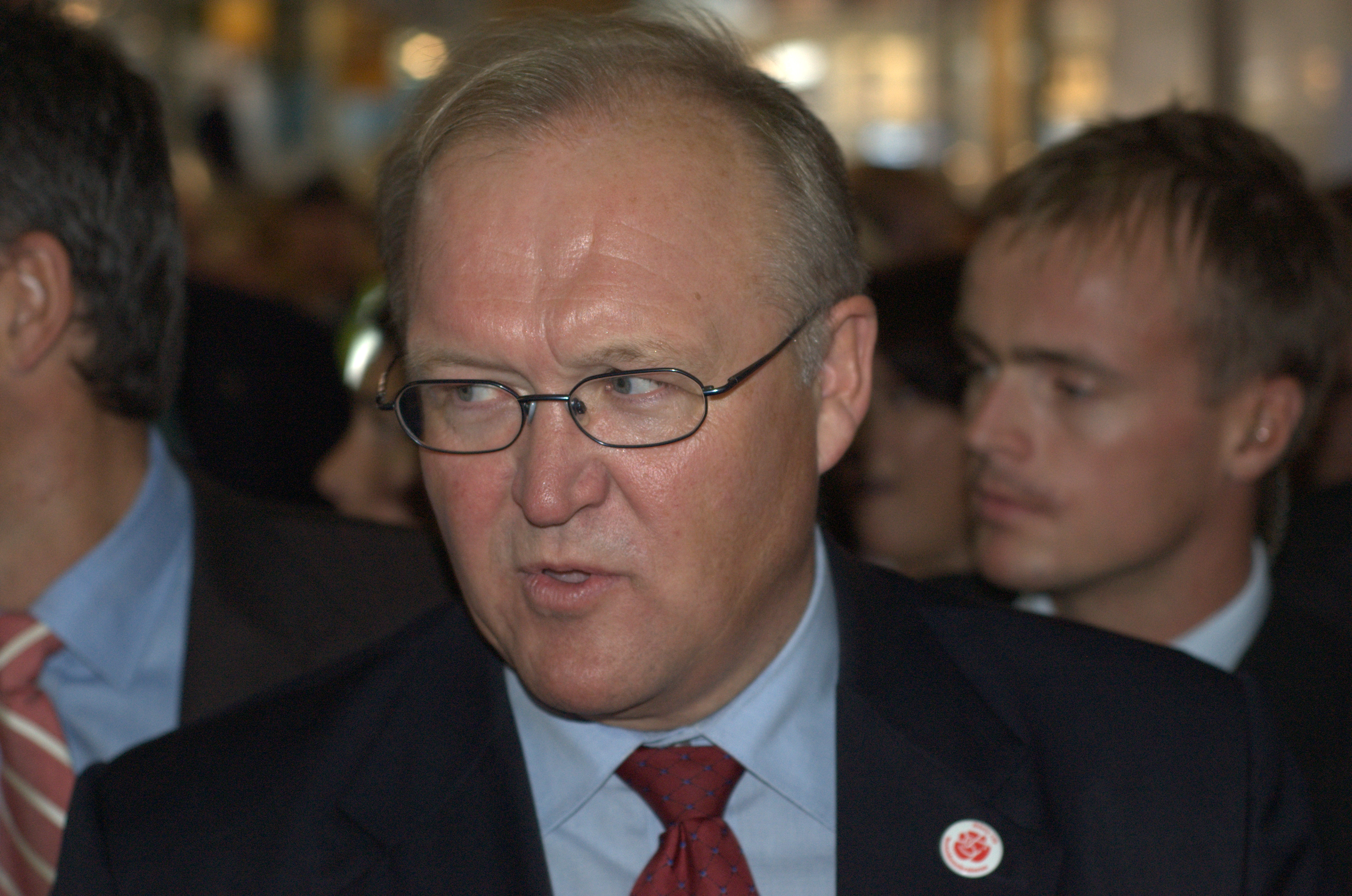
- Prime Minister Göran Persson
- Date formed: 22 March 1996
- Date dissolved: 6 October 2006

People and organisations
- Monarch: Carl XVI Gustaf
- Prime Minister: Göran Persson
- Member party: Social Democrats
- Status in legislature: Single-party minority with confidence and supply from Centre Party (1996–1998) with confidence and supply from Left Party and Green Party (1998–2006)
- Opposition parties: Moderate Party; Centre Party (1998–2006); Liberal People's Party; Left Party (1996–1998); Green Party (1996–1998); Christian Democrats
- Opposition leader: Carl Bildt (M; 1996–1999); Bo Lundgren (M; 1999–2003); Fredrik Reinfeldt (M; 2003–2006)

History
- Incoming formation: Retirement of Ingvar Carlsson
- Outgoing formation: 2006 election
- Elections: 1998 election 2002 election 2006 election
- Legislature terms: 1994–1998; 1998–2002; 2002–2006
- Predecessor: Carlsson III
- Successor: Reinfeldt

The Persson cabinet (Swedish: regeringen Persson) was the government of Sweden from 22 March 1996 to 6 October 2006. It was a Social Democratic single-party minority government led by Prime Minister Göran Persson.

Persson took over after Ingvar Carlsson, who retired as party leader and prime minister. Following the 2006 general election, the cabinet lost power to the centre-right Reinfeldt cabinet.

== Background ==
When Ingvar Carlsson in the fall of 1995 declared that he intended to resign as leader for the Social Democrats and prime minister of Sweden, Deputy Prime Minister Mona Sahlin was the only one who accepted to run for that position. However, a scandal mainly concerning irresponsible use of her Riksdag credit card and unpaid parking tickets forced her to withdraw her candidacy that same fall. The search continued and Minister for Government Coordination Jan Nyman, Minister for Health and Social Affairs Ingela Thalén as well as Minister for Finance Göran Persson became the new possible candidates, but all of them declined to run when approached by the election board.

After repeatedly declining to candidate Persson suddenly changed his mind, accepted and was elected new leader of the Social Democrats and prime minister of Sweden in March 1996. Persson inherited a party with a solid representation in the parliament, in the 1994 election more than 45 percent of the voters had given his predecessor their vote. Still not leading a party with a majority of the seats in the parliament, Persson relied on parliamentary support from the Centre Party when outlining his politics. He launched a series of cut-back programs, defending them in a famous speech to the parliament starting with the expression "One who is in debt is not free".

== Cabinet ministers ==
| Portfolio | Minister | Took office | Left office | Party |
Prime Minister's Office
| Prime Minister | Göran Persson | 22 March 1996 | 6 October 2006 | Social Democrats |
| Deputy Prime Minister | Lena Hjelm-Wallén | 7 October 1998 | 21 October 2002 | Social Democrats |
| Deputy Prime Minister | Margareta Winberg | 21 October 2002 | 31 October 2003 | Social Democrats |
| Deputy Prime Minister | Lars Engqvist | 1 June 2004 | 1 October 2004 | Social Democrats |
| Deputy Prime Minister and Minister of Sports | Bosse Ringholm | 1 November 2004 | 6 October 2006 | Social Democrats |
| Minister for Government Coordination | Leif Pagrotsky | 1996 | 1997 | Social Democrats |
| Minister for Government Coordination | Thage G. Peterson | 1997 | 1998 | Social Democrats |
| Minister for Government Coordination | Pär Nuder | 21 October 2002 | 21 October 2004 | Social Democrats |
| Minister for Government Coordination on European Affairs | Bosse Ringholm | 1 January 2005 | 6 October 2006 | Social Democrats |
| Minister for Arms Exports Issues | Leif Pagrotsky | 1996 | 1997 | Social Democrats |
Ministry of Justice
| Minister for Justice | Laila Freivalds | 7 October 1994 | 21 september 2000 | Social Democrats |
| Minister for Justice | Lena Hjelm-Wallén (Acting) | 21 September 2000 | 16 October 2000 | Social Democrats |
| Minister for Justice | Thomas Bodström | 16 October 2000 | 6 October 2006 | Social Democrats |
| Minister for Democracy, Minister for Consumer Protection and Deputy Minister of Justice | Britta Lejon | 1998 | 2000 | Social Democrats |
| Minister for Democracy, Minister for Consumer Protection, Minister for Youth and Deputy Minister of Justice | Britta Lejon | 2000 | 15 October 2002 | Social Democrats |
| Minister for Democracy, Minister for Integration, Minister for Gender Equality and Minister for Sports | Mona Sahlin | 21 October 2002 | 21 October 2004 | Social Democrats |
| Minister for Democracy, Minister for Integration, Minister for Gender Equality and Deputy Minister of Justice | Jens Orback | 21 October 2004 | 6 October 2006 | Social Democrats |
Ministry for Foreign Affairs
| Minister for Foreign Affairs | Lena Hjelm-Wallén | 7 October 1994 | 7 October 1998 | Social Democrats |
| Minister for Foreign Affairs | Anna Lindh | 7 October 1994 | 11 September 2003† | Social Democrats |
| Minister for Foreign Affairs | Jan O. Karlsson (Acting) | 11 September 2003 | 10 October 2003 | Social Democrats |
| Minister for Foreign Affairs | Laila Freivalds | 10 October 2003 | 21 March 2006 | Social Democrats |
| Minister for Foreign Affairs | Bosse Ringholm (Acting) | 21 March 2006 | 27 March 2006 | Social Democrats |
| Minister for Foreign Affairs | Carin Jämtin (Acting) | 27 March 2006 | 24 April 2006 | Social Democrats |
| Minister for Foreign Affairs | Jan Eliasson | 24 April 2006 | 6 October 2006 | Social Democrats |
| Minister for International Development Cooperation | Pierre Schori | 7 October 1994 | 14 September 1999 | Social Democrats |
| Minister for International Development Cooperation | Maj-Inger Klingvall | 14 September 1999 | 16 November 2001 | Social Democrats |
| Minister for International Development Cooperation | Jan O. Karlsson | 7 January 2002 | 10 October 2003 | Social Democrats |
| Minister for International Development Cooperation | Carin Jämtin | 10 October 2003 | 6 October 2006 | Social Democrats |
| Minister for Migration | Pierre Schori | 1996 | 14 September 1999 | Social Democrats |
| Minister for Migration | Maj-Inger Klingvall | 14 September 1999 | 16 November 2001 | Social Democrats |
| Minister for Migration | Jan O. Karlsson | 7 January 2002 | 10 October 2003 | Social Democrats |
| Minister for Migration | Barbro Holmberg | 10 October 2003 | 6 October 2006 | Social Democrats |
| Minister for Nordic Cooperation and Minister for Foreign Trade | Leif Pagrotsky | 7 October 1994 | 21 October 2002 | Social Democrats |
Ministry of Defence
| Minister for Defence | Thage G. Peterson | 7 October 1994 | 1 February 1997 | Social Democrats |
| Minister for Defence | Björn von Sydow | 1 February 1997 | 30 September 2002 | Social Democrats |
| Minister for Defence | Lena Hjelm-Wallén | 30 September 2002 | 21 October 2002 | Social Democrats |
| Minister for Defence | Pär Nuder | 21 October 2002 | 3 November 2002 | Social Democrats |
| Minister for Defence | Leni Björklund | 3 November 2002 | 6 October 2006 | Social Democrats |
Ministry of Health and Social Affairs
| Minister for Health and Social Affairs | Margot Wallström | 22 March 1996 | 1998 | Social Democrats |
| Minister for Health and Social Affairs | Anders Sundström | 1998 | 1998 | Social Democrats |
| Minister for Health and Social Affairs | Maj-Inger Klingvall (Acting) | 1998 | 1998 | Social Democrats |
| Minister for Health and Social Affairs | Lars Engqvist | 1998 | 1 October 2004 | Social Democrats |
| Minister for Health and Social Affairs | Berit Andnor | 1 October 2004 | 6 October 2006 | Social Democrats |
| Minister for Social Security | Maj-Inger Klingvall | 22 March 1996 | 14 September 1999 | Social Democrats |
| Minister for Social Security | Ingela Thalén | 14 September 1999 | 10 October 2002 | Social Democrats |
| Minister for Public Health and Social Services | Morgan Johansson | 21 October 2002 | 6 October 2006 | Social Democrats |
| Minister for Children and Family | Berit Andnor | 21 October 2002 | 2004 | Social Democrats |
| Minister for Health and the Elderly | Ylva Johansson | 2004 | 6 October 2006 | Social Democrats |
| Minister for Nordic Cooperation | Berit Andnor | 21 October 2002 | 6 October 2006 | Social Democrats |
Ministry of Communications
| Minister of Communications | Ines Uusmann | 7 October 1994 | 6 October 1998 | Social Democrats |
| Minister of Communications | Björn Rosengren (Acting) | 6 October 1998 | 31 December 1998 | Social Democrats |
Ministry of Finance
| Minister for Finance | Erik Åsbrink | 22 March 1996 | 12 April 1999 | Social Democrats |
| Minister for Finance | Bosse Ringholm | 12 April 1999 | 21 October 2004 | Social Democrats |
| Minister for Finance | Pär Nuder | 21 October 2004 | 6 October 2006 | Social Democrats |
| Minister for Taxes | Thomas Östros | 22 March 1996 | 1998 | Social Democrats |
| Minister for Public Administration and Minister for Housing | Lars Engqvist | 1998 | 1998 | Social Democrats |
| Minister for Public Administration and Minister for Housing | Lars-Erik Lövdén | 1999 | 21 October 2004 | Social Democrats |
| Minister for Financial Markets and Minister for International Economy | Gunnar Lund | 21 October 2002 | 2004 | Social Democrats |
| Minister for Financial Markets and Minister for Public Administration | Sven-Erik Österberg | 21 October 2004 | 6 October 2006 | Social Democrats |
Ministry of Education
| Minister for Education | Carl Tham | 7 October 1994 | 1998 | Social Democrats |
| Minister for Education | Thomas Östros | 1998 | 21 October 2004 | Social Democrats |
| Minister for Education | Leif Pagrotsky | 21 October 2004 | 6 October 2006 | Social Democrats |
| Minister for Culture | Leif Pagrotsky | 1 January 2005 | 6 October 2006 | Social Democrats |
| Minister for Schools | Ylva Johansson | 7 October 1994 | 1998 | Social Democrats |
| Minister for Schools | Ingegerd Wärnersson | 1998 | 16 January 2002 | Social Democrats |
| Minister for Schools | Thomas Östros | 16 January 2002 | 21 October 2004 | Social Democrats |
| Minister for Schools | Ibrahim Baylan | 21 October 2004 | 6 October 2006 | Social Democrats |
| Minister for Research | Leif Pagrotsky | 13 September 2004 | 6 October 2006 | Social Democrats |
| Minister for Preschool Education, Minister for Adult Education and Minister for Youth | Lena Hallengren | 21 October 2002 | 6 October 2006 | Social Democrats |
| Minister for Church Affairs | Lena Hallengren | 13 September 2004 | 6 October 2006 | Social Democrats |
Ministry of Agriculture
| Ministry of Agriculture | Annika Åhnberg | 1996 | 1998 | Social Democrats |
| Ministry of Agriculture and Minister for Gender Equality | Margareta Winberg | 1998 | 21 October 2002 | Social Democrats |
| Ministry of Agriculture and Minister for Consumer Protection | Ann-Christin Nykvist | 21 October 2002 | 6 October 2006 | Social Democrats |
Ministry of Employment
| Minister for Employment and Minister for Nordic Cooperation | Margareta Winberg | 1996 | 1998 | Social Democrats |
| Minister for Employment and Minister for Nordic Cooperation | Björn Rosengren (Acting) | 1998 | 1998 | Social Democrats |
| Minister for Employment and Minister for Gender Equality | Ulrica Messing | 1996 | 1998 | Social Democrats |
Ministry of the Interior
| Minister of the Interior | Jörgen Andersson | 1996 | 1998 | Social Democrats |
| Minister of the Interior | Lars Engqvist (Acting) | 1998 | 1998 | Social Democrats |
| Minister of the Interior | Lars-Erik Lövdén | 1998 | 1998 | Social Democrats |
| Minister for Integration, Minister for Sports, Minister for Youth and Minister for Consumer Protection | Leif Blomberg | 1996 | 2 March 1998† | Social Democrats |
| Minister for Integration, Minister for Sports, Minister for Youth and Minister for Consumer Protection | Lars Engqvist | 1998 | 1998 | Social Democrats |
Ministry of Culture
| Minister for Culture | Marita Ulvskog | 1996 | 13 September 2004 | Social Democrats |
| Minister for Culture | Pär Nuder (Acting) | 13 September 2004 | 21 October 2004 | Social Democrats |
| Minister for Culture | Leif Pagrotsky | 21 October 2004 | 31 December 2004 | Social Democrats |
| Minister for Church Affairs | Marita Ulvskog | 1996 | 13 September 2004 | Social Democrats |
| Minister for Integration, Minister for Sports and Minister for Youth | Ulrica Messing | 1998 | 2000 | Social Democrats |
Ministry of the Environment
| Minister of the Environment | Anna Lindh | 7 October 1994 | 7 October 1998 | Social Democrats |
| Minister of the Environment | Kjell Larsson | 7 October 1998 | 15 October 2002 | Social Democrats |
| Minister of the Environment | Lena Sommestad | 15 October 2002 | 6 October 2006 | Social Democrats |
| Minister of the Environment, Minister for Housing and Minister for Energy | Mona Sahlin | 21 October 2004 | 6 October 2006 | Social Democrats |
| Deputy Minister of the Environmenτ | Lena Sommestad | 16 January 2002 | 21 October 2002 | Social Democrats |

== 1998 general election ==
The 1998 general election became a huge setback for the Social Democrats, now supported by only 36.4 percent of the voters. The Moderate Party leader, Carl Bildt, expressed his concerns about Prime Minister Persson not resigning from office as an outcome of the election. Bildt claimed that the government forming process should start all over with the Speaker of parliament selecting a prime minister based on their ability to form a government. He initiated a vote of no confidence against Persson, but it was opposed by a majority formed by the Social Democrats together with the Left Party and the Green Party, which were to be the cabinets' new political partners. Persson's one-party government stayed in office, this term with confidence and supply from the Left Party and the Green Party.

== 2002 general election ==
In the 2002 general election, Prime Minister Persson gained an increase in voter support with 39.9 percent voting for his party. The Moderate Party leader, now Bo Lundgren, again initiated a vote of no confidence against Persson, but this time targeting the whereabouts of the actual parliamentary support for him. In this vote, Persson only received support from a minority as the Green Party refrained from voting. However, he still managed to stay in office since a majority did not vote actively against him. He continued his one-party government policy and extended his co-operation with the Left Party and the Green Party for another four-year term.

== Controversies and public perception ==
=== Suspected ballot rigging ===
After the 2002 elections, electoral workers in the Stockholm area expressed concerns about how Social Democratic campaign workers had collected large numbers of voting cards from voters and voted on their behalf. To collect large quantities of voting cards and vote in such a way is unconstitutional and therefore gained some initial media attention. The county and city of Stockholm, governed by a coalition led by the Moderate Party, became subject to change of leadership as a result of the election and the criticism was quickly silenced. The circumstances of the suspected ballot rigging was never investigated. There have been other cases that have led to evictions at 2002 elections for ballot rigging by Social democratic party members working in the election offices. Many reports of other ballot rigging have also been announced throughout the country by other parties but in lack of proof none has gone to court.

=== Handling of the tsunami disaster ===
During 2005 a scandal erupted as a result of widespread discontent with the lack of government aid to Swedes who fell victims to the notorious tsunami disaster, killing hundreds of Swedish tourists in December 2004. The criticism emerged early since the government refused to give clearance to prepared Swedish military rescue planes to aid in the rescue efforts in Asia. The planes were left stranded on Swedish airfields and Swedish tourists, in many cases severely injured, had to wait for the few crowded regular flights that were available back home to Sweden. A committee initiated an investigation in 2005 to shed some light on what really happened during the Christmas of 2004 and if anyone ever had noticed the early reports from the Swedish military intelligence offices. The scandal escalated into a case for the Swedish standing committee of constitution inqueries (constitutional court) as it became evident that Swedish government officials either lied or refused to answer properly to the questions asked by the investigators. In early 2006 the scandal reached its climax as top ministers, including the prime minister, were interrogated under trial-like circumstances broadcast live on Swedish television. There has also been suspicious deletion of communication traffic registers and e-mails regarding the time of this event. A directive was changed to delete this kind of data after a shorter time and after it had been done the directive was once again revised to its original writing. After the election and a new cabinet come to be in power. Backup tapes of the deleted information has now been found stored in a vault in the cellar.

=== Persson accused of threatening TV4 ===
During the live broadcast interrogations the CEO of the largest privately held Swedish TV-channel, Jan Scherman, claimed that Prime Minister Göran Persson threatened him during the election campaign in 2002. In Sweden, the Swedish Television, SVT, with the other two large TV-channels, SVT1 and SVT2, is connected to the government and Social Democrats hold key positions among the board of directors. Björn Rosengren, Social Democrat, former Minister of Enterprise and close friend of Göran Persson, has rapidly gained an influential position in the Swedish media company MTG which in turn owns TV-channels and newspapers such as Metro International.

=== Defamation campaign in 2006 ===
In 2006 an extensive e-mail based defamation campaign primarily targeting the family of Swedish leading opposition politician Fredrik Reinfeldt was revealed in Swedish media. The content of the letters written were rumours about irregularities or illegal actions claimed to have been performed by Fredrik Reinfeldt himself or his close relatives. According to computer specialists the source of the campaign had been tracked down to computers located at the Social Democratic HQ in central Stockholm. Initially spokespersons of the Social Democratic Party denied all involvement in the defamation but were later forced to confess that one of their employees had written the letters as evidence became overwhelming. The case was reported to the police by the Moderate Party but was closed a few days later since it was considered a private law-issue.

=== The Pirate Bay affair ===
The raid of 31 May 2006 on The Pirate Bay ISP PRQ is thought to be a direct result of the justice minister Thomas Bodström. As a result, he is now the subject of an investigation by the Constitutional Committee. This type of 'interference' in the functioning of independent authorities such as the police, called 'ministerstyre', is by Swedish law prohibited. Media requested to see e-mails that could be relevant to the matter but the 700 of the 900 e-mails requested were denied on the basis that they were top secret declaration. Previously, the government said that the matter would be open for public review. When it was asked why the e-mails had been declared top secret Thomas Bodström said that they were covered by the secrecy declaration which is determined by the government.

=== Minister of foreign affairs resigns ===
In the aftermaths of criticism following on the tsunami disaster, the harshly criticised Swedish minister of foreign affairs, Laila Freivalds, managed to maintain her office. However, in 2006 another embarrassing scandal erupted with its roots in Denmark where paintings of the Muslim prophet Muhammed were published during the fall of 2005. A Swedish right-wing political newspaper decided to publish them as well on the Internet edition of their publication, the webpage however was quickly closed down by the ISP after intervention from the Swedish Security Service and the Swedish office of foreign affairs. The close down became subject to much debate and some journalists compared it to the censorship of anti-German articles during WWII. Mrs. Freivalds denied at first all involvement in the case, but was forced to confess as official reports clearly pointed out her central role in the closing of the webpage. The political pressure became too much and Prime Minister Göran Persson, flanked by Mrs. Freivalds herself, chose to briefly declare the resignation of his minister of foreign affairs under a short press conference. That Freivalds did not declare the expected news herself, despite the fact that she was obviously present on the press conference, quickly spurred discussions about whether she resigned voluntarily or actually got dismissed by the prime minister.

| Preceded by Carlsson III cabinet | Cabinet of Sweden; 1996–2006 | Succeeded by Reinfeldt cabinet |
