= Birgit Friggebo =

Swedish politician (born 1941)

Governor for the County of Jönköping
- In office 1998–2004

Personal details
- Born: 25 December 1941 (age 84)
- Party: Liberal People's Party
- Spouse: Bo Södersten

Birgit Irma Gunborg Friggebo (born 25 December 1941) is a Swedish politician and member of the Liberal People's Party. Born in Falköping, she married economics professor Bo Södersten in 1997.

Friggebo was minister for planning in the Ministry of Housing between 1976 and 1978 and minister for housing between 1978 and 1982. Between 1991 and 1994 she was minister for culture and minister for immigration. She was a member of the Swedish Parliament between 1979 and 1982 and yet again between 1985 and 1997. From 1998 to 2004, she was the governor for the County of Jönköping.

== Legacy ==
As Minister for Housing, she removed the need for a planning approval to build small sheds under 15 square meters of area. Such sheds are now popularly known as "friggebod", a pun on her surname, bod meaning shed.

As Minister for Culture and Immigration, she appeared in a televised debate held in Rinkeby on the serial sniper John Ausonius's reign of terror. During the debate she stood up and tried to get the crowd consisting mostly of non-white immigrants to sing "We Shall Overcome". The incident was widely regarded as an embarrassment and a public relations debacle and showed the alienation felt by many immigrants vis-à-vis the centre-right coalition government.

== Honours and decorations ==
=== National honours ===
- (Sweden) H. M. The King's Medal, 12th size, worn on the ribbon of the Order of the Seraphim (6 June 2026)

Political offices
New ministerial post	Swedish Minister for Planning; 1976–1978	Ministerial post discontinued
Preceded by Elvy Olsson	Swedish Minister for Housing; 1978–1982	Succeeded by Hans Gustafsson
Preceded by Ulf Lönnqvist	Swedish Minister for Housing; 1991	Ministry dissolved
Preceded by Bengt Göransson	Swedish Minister for Culture; 1991–1994	Succeeded by Margot Wallström
Preceded by Maj-Lis Lööw	Swedish Minister for Immigration; 1991–1994	Succeeded by Leif Blomberg
Preceded by Maj-Lis Lööw	Swedish Minister for Gender Equality; 1991–1993	Succeeded by Bengt Westerberg
Government offices
Preceded by Gösta Gunnarsson	Governor of Jönköping County; 1998–2004	Succeeded by Lars Engqvist
