= Hans Karlsson =

Swedish politician

Minister for Employment
- In office 2002–2006

Personal details
- Political party: Social Democratic

Hans Karlsson (born 21 October 1946) is a Swedish Social Democratic politician. From 2002 to 2006, he served in the Cabinet of Göran Persson as Minister for Employment in the Ministry of Enterprise, Energy and Communications of the Swedish government. His responsibilities included health and work injury insurance and sick pay.

A painter by profession, Hans Karlsson came into politics through the Swedish Painters' Union, a trade union affiliated to LO, the Swedish Trade Union Confederation. In 1975 he became branch chairman for the Örebro County branch, and in 1978 he started to work for the union. In 1986 he became Organising Secretary at LO, where he later held other posts, including Collective Bargaining Secretary.

In 1993, Karlsson was elected to the National Board of the Swedish Social Democratic Party. In 2002, Prime Minister Göran Persson made him Minister for Employment.

Karlsson holds no university degree, but has studied labour market issues and labour legislation at Örebro University College (now Örebro University) in the 1970s.

Hans Karlsson is married with five children.

Political offices
Preceded by Mona Sahlin	Swedish Minister for Employment; 21 October 2002 – 6 October 2006	Succeeded by Sven Otto Littorin
