= Rolf Wirtén =

Swedish politician (1931–2023)

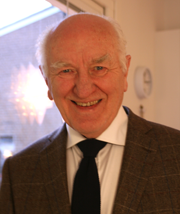
- Wirtén in 2013

Personal details
- Born: 4 May 1931
- Died: 19 February 2023 (aged 91)
- Party: Liberals

Rolf Gustav Stefan Wirtén (4 May 1931 – 19 February 2023) was a Swedish politician who held various ministerial posts, including the minister of economics and minister for the budget in the 1970s and 1980s.

== Biography ==
Wirtén was born on 4 May 1931. He started his career as a teacher in Jönköping in the 1950s. He was a member of the Liberals and was elected to the first chamber of the Parliament in 1966, serving there until 1970. He was a member of Parliament from 1971 to 1985.

On 7 March 1978 Wirtén was named the minister for gender equality and the minister for immigration. His tenure ended on 18 October 1978. He was the minister for employment between 1978 and 1980 in the cabinet led by Prime Minister Thorbjörn Fälldin. In 1980 Wirtén was appointed minister for the budget, and next year he was made the minister of economics in the second cabinet led by Thorbjörn Fälldin. He held both posts until 1982. During his term Sweden experienced devaluation in 1981. He reported that while serving as minister the Swedish economic policy had been designed on the Keynesian principles.

Wirtén was the governor of Östergötland between 1987 and 1996. In 1997 he was the head of a commission which investigated the allegations about the diamonds of Jewish people stolen by the Nazis and smuggled into Sweden.

Wirtén died on 19 February 2023, at the age of 91.

He established a foundation named the Wirtén Cultural Foundation. It awards a cultural prize, Wirtén kulturpris, which has been given since 2000 on his birthday, 4 May. The ceremony has taken place at the Linköping Castle.
