= Karin Andersson =

Karin Andersson may refer to:

- Karin Andersson (politician) (1918–2012), Swedish politician
- Karin Mamma Andersson (born 1962), Swedish artist
- Karin Dreijer (born 1975), Swedish singer and musician
