= Carl Bildt cabinet =

Government of Sweden from 1991 to 1994

Bildt's Cabinet
- 49th Cabinet of Sweden

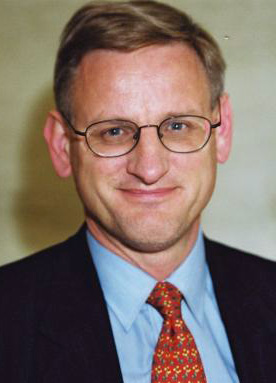
- Prime Minister Carl Bildt
- Date formed: 4 October 1991
- Date dissolved: 7 October 1994

People and organisations
- Monarch: Carl XVI Gustaf
- Prime Minister: Carl Bildt
- Member parties: Moderate Party; Liberal People's Party; Centre Party; Christian Democrats
- Status in legislature: Coalition minority
- Opposition parties: Social Democrats; New Democracy; Left Party
- Opposition leader: Ingvar Carlsson (S)

History
- Incoming formation: 1991 election
- Outgoing formation: 1994 election
- Elections: 1991 election 1994 election
- Legislature terms: 1991–1994
- Predecessor: Carlsson II
- Successor: Carlsson III

The Carl Bildt cabinet (Swedish: regeringen Carl Bildt) was the government of Sweden from 4 October 1991 to 7 October 1994. It was a coalition minority government between the Moderate Party, the Liberal People's Party, the Centre Party, and the Christian Democrats, led by Prime Minister Carl Bildt of the Moderate Party. It was the first Moderate Party led cabinet in Sweden in 61 years, after the second cabinet of Arvid Lindman from 1928 to 1930.

The cabinet was installed following the 1991 general election and resigned following the 1994 general election. It was succeeded by the Social Democratic Carlsson III cabinet.

== Ministers ==
Portfolio	Minister	Party	Took office	Left office
Prime Minister's Office
Prime Minister, Head of the Prime Minister's Office	Carl Bildt	Moderate	4 October 1991	7 October 1994
Ministry of Justice
Minister for Justice, Head of the Ministry of Justice	Gun Hellsvik	Moderate	4 October 1991	7 October 1994
Deputy Minister for Justice	Reidunn Laurén	none	4 October 1991	7 October 1994
Ministry for Foreign Affairs
Minister for Foreign Affairs, Head of the Ministry for Foreign Affairs	Margaretha af Ugglas	Moderate	4 October 1991	7 October 1994
Minister for Development Cooperation	Alf Svensson	Christian Democrats	4 October 1991	7 October 1994
European Affairs and Foreign Trade	Ulf Dinkelspiel	Moderate	4 October 1991	7 October 1994
Ministry of Defence
Minister for Defence, Head of the Ministry of Defence	Anders Björck	Moderate	4 October 1991	3 October 1994
Minister for Defence, Head of the Ministry of Defence	Per Unckel	Moderate	3 October 1994	7 October 1994
Ministry of Social Affairs
Minister for Social Affairs, Head of the Ministry of Social Affairs, Deputy Prime Minister	Bengt Westerberg	Liberals	4 October 1991	7 October 1994
Minister for Health Care	Bo Könberg	Liberals	4 October 1991	7 October 1994
Ministry of Communications
Minister for Communications, Head of the Communications	Mats Odell	Christian Democrats	4 October 1991	7 October 1994
Ministry of Finance
Minister for Finance, Head of the Ministry of Finance	Anne Wibble	Liberals	4 October 1991	7 October 1994
Minister for Taxes	Bo Lundgren	Moderate	4 October 1991	7 October 1994
Ministry of Education
Minister for Education, Head of the Ministry of Education	Per Unckel	Moderate	4 October 1991	7 October 1994
Minister for Schools	Beatrice Ask	Moderate	4 October 1991	7 October 1994
Ministry of Agriculture
Minister for Agriculture, Head of the Ministry of Agriculture	Karl Erik Olsson	Centre	4 October 1991	7 October 1994
Ministry of Employment
Minister for Employment, Head of the Ministry of Employment	Börje Hörnlund	Centre	4 October 1991	7 October 1994
Ministry of Housing
Minister for Housing, Head of the Ministry of Housing	Birgit Friggebo	Liberals	4 October 1991	30 November 1991
Ministry of Industry
Minister for Industry, Head of the Ministry of Industry	Per Westerberg	Moderate	4 October 1991	21 October 1991
Ministry of Enterprise
Minister for Enterprise, Head of the Ministry of Enterprise	Per Westerberg	Moderate	21 October 1991	7 October 1994
Ministry for Civil Service Affairs
Minister for Civil Service Affairs, Head of the Ministry for Civil Service Affairs	Inger Davidsson	Christian Democrats	21 October 1991	7 October 1994
Ministry of the Environment and Natural Resources
Minister for the Environment and Natural Resources, Head of the Ministry of the Environment and Natural Resources	Olof Johansson	Centre	4 October 1991	16 June 1994
Minister for the Environment and Natural Resources, Head of the Ministry of the Environment and Natural Resources	Görel Thurdin	Centre	16 June 1994	3 October 1994
Minister for the Environment and Natural Resources, Head of the Ministry of the Environment and Natural Resources	Karl Erik Olsson	Centre	3 October 1994	7 October 1994
Deputy Minister for the Environment and Natural Resources	Görel Thurdin	Centre	4 October 1991	16 June 1994
Ministry of Culture
Minister for Culture, Head of the Ministry of Culture	Birgit Friggebo	Liberals	1 December 1991	7 October 1994

== See also ==
- 1990–1994 Swedish financial crisis

Preceded by Carlsson II cabinet	Cabinet of Sweden; 1991–1994	Succeeded by Carlsson III cabinet
