= Anna-Greta Leijon =

Swedish politician (1939–2024)

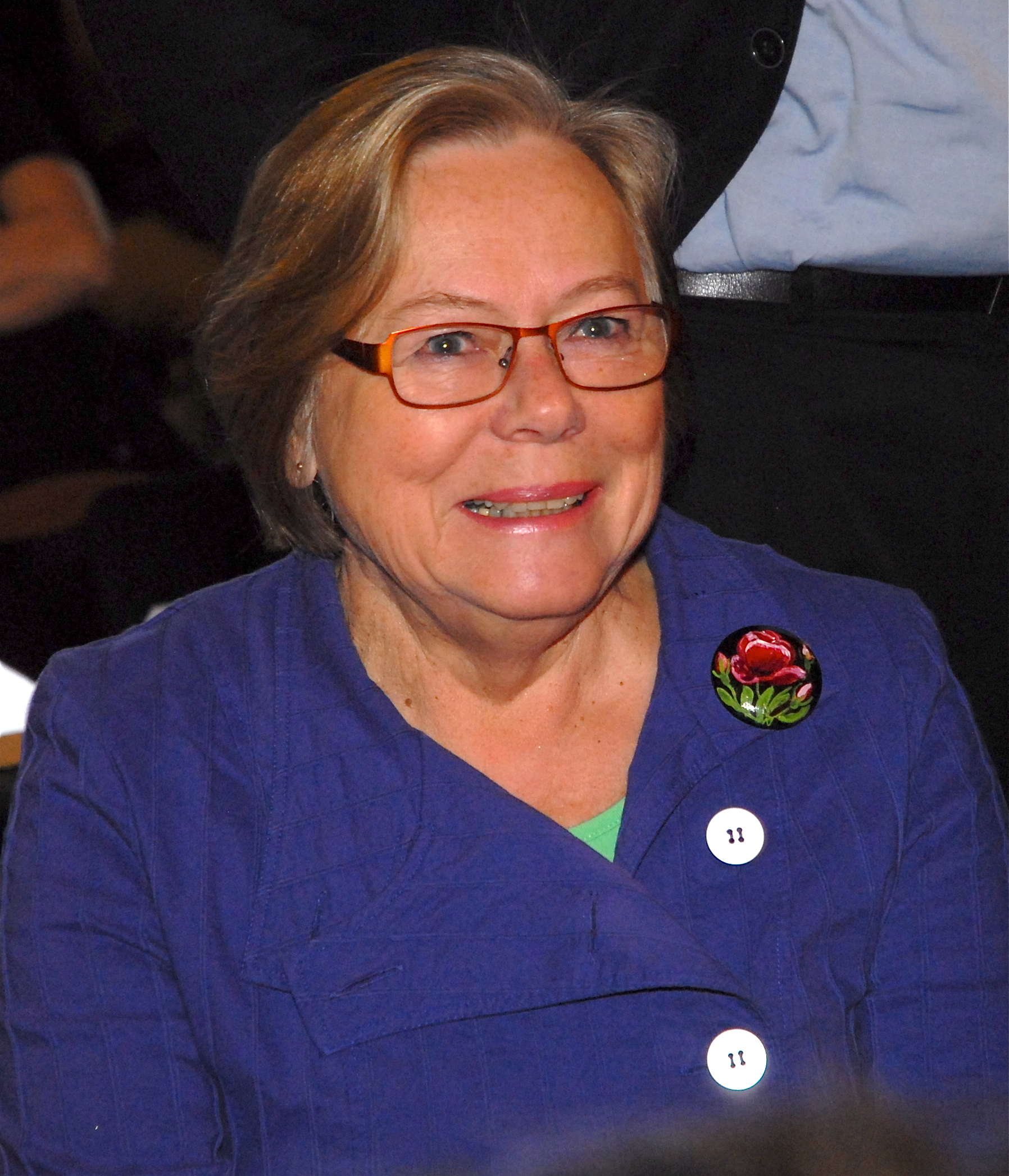
- Leijon in 2012

Minister for Justice
- In office 19 October 1987 – 7 June 1988
- Prime Minister: Ingvar Carlsson
- Preceded by: Sten Wickbom
- Succeeded by: Thage G. Peterson
- In office 11 November 1983 – 15 November 1983; Acting
- Prime Minister: Olof Palme
- Preceded by: Ove Rainer
- Succeeded by: Sten Wickbom

Minister for Employment
- In office 8 October 1982 – 19 October 1987
- Prime Minister: Olof Palme; Ingvar Carlsson
- Preceded by: Ingemar Eliasson
- Succeeded by: Ingela Thalén

Minister for Immigration and for Gender Equality Deputy Minister for Employment
- In office 3 November 1973 – 8 October 1976
- Prime Minister: Olof Palme
- Preceded by: Camilla Odhnoff
- Succeeded by: Eva Winther (1978)

Personal details
- Born: Anna Margareta Maria Lejon; 30 June 1939 Stockholm, Sweden
- Died: 11 April 2024 (aged 84) Stockholm, Sweden
- Party: Social Democrats
- Spouse: Leif Backéus (m. 1975; div. 1996)
- Domestic partner: Anders Leion (1964–1970)
- Children: Britta, Svante
- Education: Uppsala University

Anna-Greta Leijon (born Anna Margareta Maria Lejon; 30 June 1939 – 11 April 2024) was a Swedish Social Democratic politician. Leijon began her political career in 1964 at the Swedish Labour Market Administration, eventually becoming its director in 1970. From 1973 to 1976, she served as a minister without portfolio and was a member of the Riksdag from 1974 to 1990, notably serving as vice chairman of the Committee on the Labour Market from 1979 to 1982.

Within the Social Democratic Party, she held various roles including membership in the Executive Committee from 1981 onwards. Leijon's ministerial positions included employment (1982–1987), gender equality (1986), and justice (1987–1988), although she did not hold a law degree. However, her tenure as justice minister ended abruptly due to the Ebbe Carlsson affair. Notably, she chaired the General Conference of the International Labour Organization in 1984. Beyond politics, Leijon served as director general of the National Institute of Occupational Health from 1992 and held several public roles, including chairmanship of Sveriges Television (SVT) and Moderna Museet.

== Early life ==
Leijon was born on 30 June 1939 in Högalid Parish, Stockholm, Sweden.

== Career ==
=== Political career ===
Leijon was employed at the Swedish Labour Market Administration (Arbetsmarknadsstyrelsen) in 1964 and became agency director there in 1970. Leijon was minister without portfolio from 1973 to 1976 and member of the Riksdag (s) from 1974 to 1990 (vice chairman of the Committee on the Labour Market from 1979 to 1982). She was a member of the Executive Committee of the Social Democratic Party Board from 1981, minister for employment from 1982 to 1987, minister for gender equality in 1986 and minister for justice from 1987 to 1988 when she was forced to step down due to the Ebbe Carlsson affair. Leijon was chairman of the Committee on Finance from 1988 to 1990.

Leijon was chairman of the General Conference of the International Labour Organization in 1984.

=== Kidnapping plans ===
Following the 1975 West German Embassy siege in Stockholm, the German Red Army Faction (RAF) terrorist Norbert Kröcher allegedly planned to kidnap Anna-Greta Leijon. The goal was to exchange Leijon for eight of his comrades held in German prisons. The plan, known as Operation Leo, was intercepted by the Swedish Security Service (Säpo) and Kröcher was arrested on 31 March in Stockholm. He was deported from Sweden in 1977 and jailed in Germany. He was released in 1989 and did not rejoin the RAF. Leijon was chosen as the kidnapping victim because she had the responsibility for the terrorist legislation and was ultimately responsible for the expulsion of the RAF terrorists who carried out the embassy siege.

=== Other work ===
Leijon became director general of the National Institute of Occupational Health (Arbetsmiljöinstitutet) in 1992. After her time as politician, Anna-Greta Leijon had several public assignments, including as chairman of the Sveriges Television (SVT) from 1994 to 2000. In 1995, she succeeded Hans Alfredson as head of Skansen open-air museum in Stockholm, an assignment that she held until 31 August 2005, when she was replaced by John Brattmyhr. She was chairman of the Swedish Council for Social Research (Socialvetenskapliga forskningsrådet) from 1990 to 1993 and of Moderna Museet from 1994 to 2000.

== Personal life ==
From 1964 to 1970, she was partner of Anders Leion (born 1939). In 1975, she married electrical engineer Leif Backéus (born 1934). They divorced in 1996. She was the mother of Britta Lejon, the former Minister for Democratic Issues in Sweden. Anna-Greta Leijon, her former partner Anders Leion and their daughter Britta Lejon all spell their surnames differently.

Leijon died on 11 April 2024 at the age of 84.

== Books ==
- Leijon, Anna-Greta (1991). Alla rosor ska inte tuktas! [Not All Roses Must Be Pruned!] (in Swedish). Stockholm: Tiden. ISBN 9155037887. OCLC 26975916. SELIBR 7421813.

== See also ==
- Operation Leo

Political offices
Preceded by Camilla Odhnoff	Minister for Immigration and for Gender Equality; Deputy Minister for Employment; 1973–1976	Succeeded by Eva Winther (from 1978)
Preceded by Ingemar Eliasson	Minister for Employment; 1982–1987	Succeeded by Ingela Thalén
Preceded by Sten Wickbom	Minister for Justice; 1987–1988	Succeeded by Thage G. Peterson
Preceded by Arne Gadd	Chairman of Committee on Finance; 1988–1990	Succeeded by Hans Gustafsson
Other offices
Preceded by Hans Alfredson	Head of Skansen; 1995–2005	Succeeded by John Brattmyhr
