= Bo Södersten =

Swedish economist and politician

Member of Parliament
- In office 1979–1988

Personal details
- Born: 5 June 1931
- Died: 5 September 2017
- Political party: Swedish Social Democratic Party
- Spouse: Birgit Friggebo
- Occupation: economist

Bo Södersten (5 June 1931 – 5 September 2017) was a Swedish economist and politician.

A native of Dalarna County, Södersten attended Uppsala University and the Stockholm University, where he studied under Ingvar Svennilson. From 1961 to 1962, Södersten spent time at the University of California, Berkeley and the Massachusetts Institute of Technology in the United States. He completed his dissertation in 1964, after returning to Stockholm.

Södersten taught at the University of Gothenburg from 1971 to 1977. He then joined the faculty of Lund University. Södersten served on the Riksdag from 1979 to 1988 as a member of the Swedish Social Democratic Party. Södersten moved to Jönköping University in 1998, after his wife Birgit Friggebo was appointed governor of the county. Upon the end of her gubernatorial term, Friggebo and Södersten moved to Stockholm.

In 2022, a book was published about him entitled Bo Södersten from Left to Right. Portrait of a Political Economist.
