= Swedish Union of Civil Servants =

Trade union in Sweden

ST
- Swedish Union of Civil Servants
- Statstjänstemannaförbundet
- Founded: 1904
- Headquarters: Stockholm
- Location: Sweden
- Members: 97,000
- Key people: Britta Lejon, president
- Affiliations: TCO, PSI
- Website: www.st.org

The Swedish Union of Civil Servants (Statstjänstemannaförbundet, ST) is a trade union in Sweden. With a membership of 97,000 it is the largest union of civil servants in the country.

ST is affiliated with the Swedish Confederation of Professional Employees (TCO).

== Presidents ==
1991: Lisbeth Eklund
1999: Annette Carnhede
2012: Britta Lejon
