= Britta Lejon =

Swedish trade unionist and politician (born 1964)

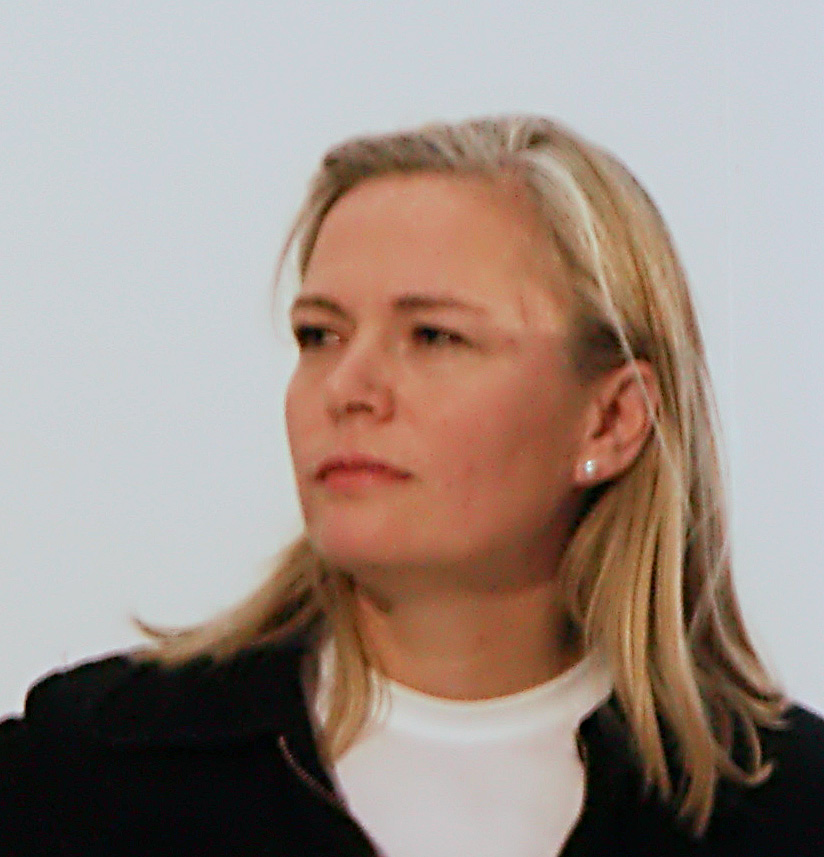
- Lejon in 2006

State Minister for Democracy
- In office 7 October 1998 – 21 October 2002

Member of Parliament
- In office 2002–2006

First vice-president, Committee on Justice
- In office 25 November 2004 – 2 October 2006

Personal details
- Born: 2 November 1964 (age 61) Järfälla, Sweden
- Occupation: politician, trade unionist

Britta Lejon (born 2 November 1964) is a Swedish trade unionist and Social Democratic politician. She was a member of the Riksdag, and the cabinet of Göran Persson. Lejon is currently the president of the Swedish Union of Civil Servants (ST) and president of the global union federation, Public Services International.

== Biography ==
Lejon is the daughter of former Minister of Justice, Anna-Greta Leijon.

After graduating from gymnasium (secondary school) at Spånga gymnasium in 1983, she studied at the Universities of Stockholm and Lund. Lejon worked for the Department of Transportations during 1987-1990 and worked at the Department of Communication in 1990. She was State Minister for Democratic Issues in the Ministry of Justice 1998-2002, when she was succeeded by Mona Sahlin.

From 2004 to 2009, Lejon was president of the Swedish Library Organisation. She then served as president of the Swedish Union of Civil Servants from 2012, and also president of the European Federation of Public Service Unions (EPSU) from 2015 to 2019. In 2023, she was elected president of Public Services International.

Trade union offices
Preceded by Annette Carnhede	President of the Swedish Union of Civil Servants; 2012–present	Succeeded by Incumbent
Preceded by Dave Prentis	President of the Public Services International; 2023–present	Succeeded by Incumbent
