= Mona Sahlin =

Swedish politician (born 1957)

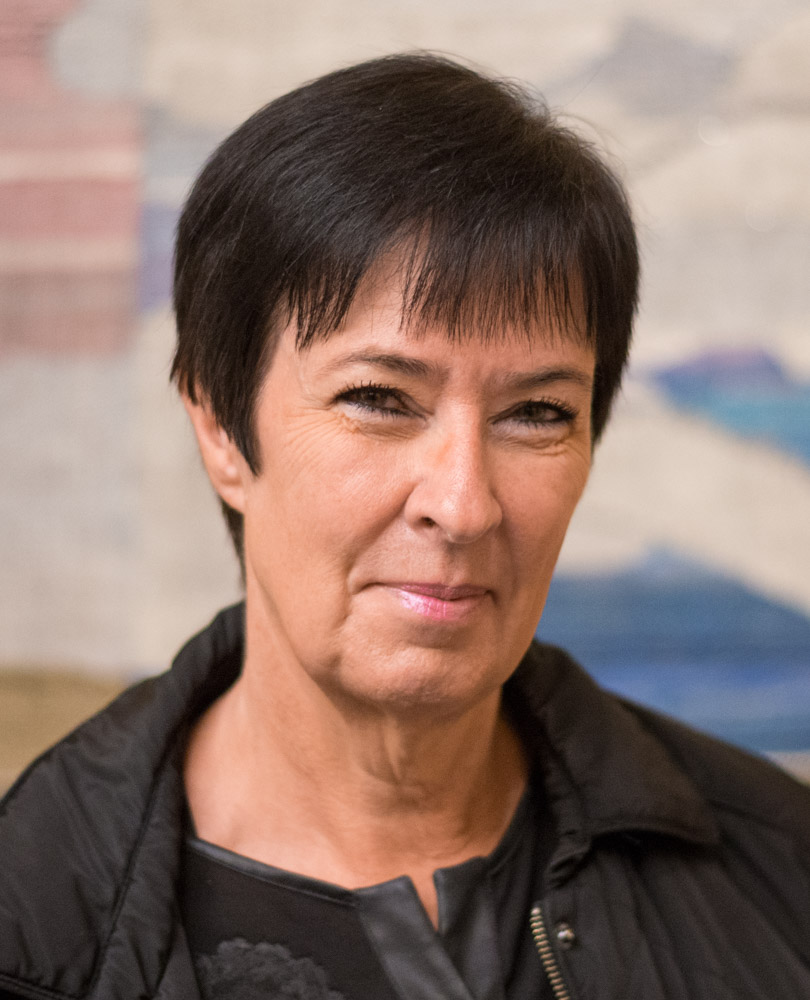
- Mona Sahlin in 2015

Leader of the Social Democratic Party
- In office 17 March 2007 – 25 March 2011
- General Secretary: Marita Ulvskog; Ibrahim Baylan
- Preceded by: Göran Persson
- Succeeded by: Håkan Juholt

Leader of the Opposition
- In office 17 March 2007 – 25 March 2011
- Monarch: Carl XVI Gustaf
- Prime Minister: Fredrik Reinfeldt
- Preceded by: Göran Persson
- Succeeded by: Håkan Juholt

Deputy Prime Minister of Sweden
- In office 7 October 1994 – 16 November 1995
- Prime Minister: Ingvar Carlsson
- Preceded by: Bengt Westerberg
- Succeeded by: Lena Hjelm-Wallén

Member of the Riksdag for Stockholm County
- In office 2002–2011
- In office 1982–1996

Personal details
- Born: Mona Ingeborg Andersson; 9 March 1957 (age 69) Sollefteå, Sweden
- Party: Social Democrats
- Spouse: Bo Sahlin (m. 1982)
- Children: 4
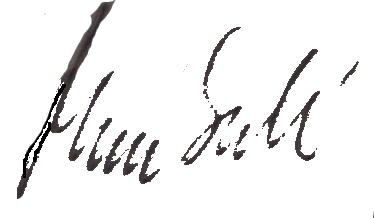
- Signature

Mona Ingeborg Sahlin (Swedish pronunciation: [ˈmôːna saˈliːn]; née Andersson; born 9 March 1957) is a Swedish politician who was leader of the opposition and leader of the Swedish Social Democratic Party from 2007 to 2011.

Sahlin was a Member of Parliament, representing Stockholm County, from 1982 to 1996 and again from 2002 to 2011. She has also held ministerial posts in the Swedish government from 1990 to 1991, from 1994 to 1995 and from 1998 to 2006. Sahlin was elected as leader of the Social Democratic Party on 17 March 2007, succeeding Göran Persson who resigned as leader following the defeat in the 2006 general election. Sahlin is the first female leader of the Swedish Social Democratic Party and became in 2011 the first since Claes Tholin in 1907 to leave that position without having served as Prime Minister of Sweden. In 2012, her successor Håkan Juholt joined her as the second now living person to do so. On 14 November 2010, following another electoral defeat for the Social Democrats, she announced her intent to step down as party chairman, which she did in early 2011.

== Youth and education ==
Sahlin was born Mona Ingeborg Andersson in Sollefteå, Västernorrland County, Sweden. Her father, Hans Andersson, worked at youth care schools community homes. In the mid-1960s, the family moved to Järla in Stockholm County where they remained. Her father later became an advisor to former Prime Minister Ingvar Carlsson.

In 1964, at the age of seven, Sahlin founded the Swedish "Barbie Club". During her childhood, she also enjoyed soccer and music. Sahlin performed as one of the back up singers to Jan Malmsjö, in the selection for the song to represent Sweden in the Eurovision Song Contest 1969. The song was written by Benny Andersson and Lasse Berghagen and it came in second place.

Sahlin was educated at Nacka Samskola and Södra Latin in Stockholm and completed secondary school in 1977. From 1976 to 1977, she was vice chairperson of the Swedish Pupils' Association. Thereafter she worked at a private company and later as a trade union representative for the Swedish National Union of State Employees.

== Political career ==
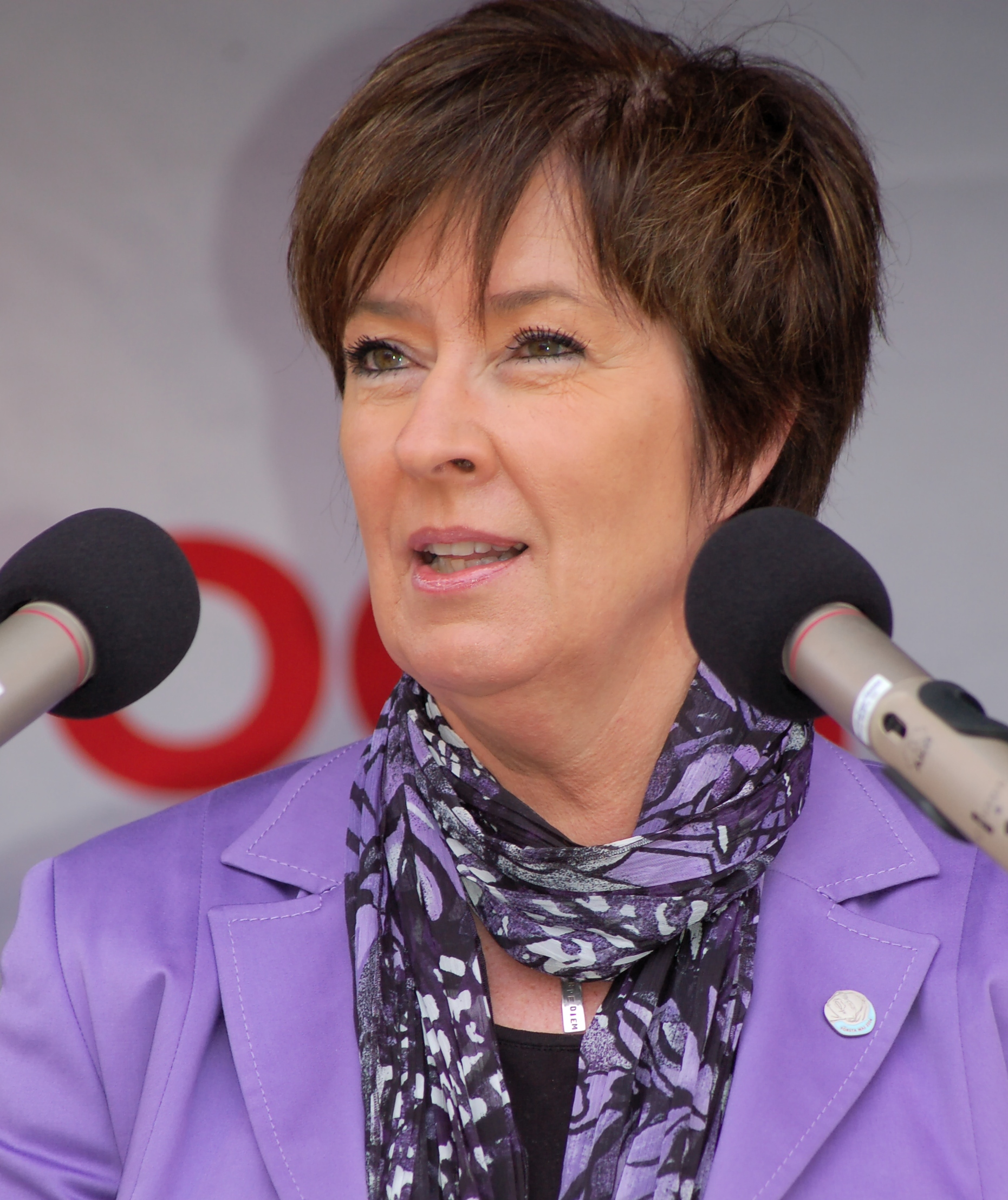
Sahlin in 2010

At age 13, Sahlin joined the Swedish support group for the Viet Cong. Sahlin's political career began in the Swedish Social Democratic Youth League in Nacka, Stockholm County, in 1973, at the age of 16. This was during the Vietnam War, and already as a 13-year-old Sahlin had joined the Swedish FNL group.

In the Swedish general election of 1982, Sahlin was elected to the Riksdag as the youngest member of parliament at that time. In 1990, she became Minister for Employment, but after the Social Democrats lost power in the 1991 election, Sahlin began to serve as chairman of the Riksdag's Committee on the Labour Market and as spokesman for the Social Democrats on labour market issues. From 1992 to 1994, she was party secretary. During this period, she openly criticized government reforms, particularly on social welfare and employees' rights, maintaining they needed to be reversed. She left her position to rejoin the government as Minister for Gender Equality and Deputy Prime Minister, when the Social Democrats regained power in the 1994 election.

In October 1995, the newspaper Expressen following an investigation led by Christian Democratic Spanish-Swedish Public Auditor Carlos Medina de Rebolledo reported that Sahlin, who was then serving as Deputy Prime Minister and was widely seen as the main candidate to succeed Ingvar Carlsson as Prime Minister, had charged SEK 53,174 for private expenses on her working charge card, which was only for working expenses. At a news conference, she admitted that she had used a Government credit card to buy groceries. She further confessed to having failed to pay 19 parking tickets and several bills for her children's day care on time. Later, she apologized in a Stockholm newspaper. A preliminary investigation was initiated by the chief prosecutor Jan Danielsson, as a result of the transactions, and was closed in early 1996 when it came to the conclusion that there was no infringement. She eventually paid the bills (along with an extra of SEK 15,000, which was later returned) to the Treasury. The controversy was dubbed as the "Toblerone affair" due to the inclusion of Toblerone bars on the credit card statement.

=== Break from politics and return ===
From 1996 to 1997, Sahlin worked as a self-employed owner of a small company and as a television reporter. In 1997, she was elected chairman of the European Council Against Racism and in 1998 she became the head of the Social Democratic youth education school Bommersvik.

Sahlin returned to national politics in 1998 when then Prime Minister Göran Persson appointed her as Minister without Portfolio. She served first in the Ministry of Industry, Employment and Communication from 1998 to 2002, then from 2002 to 2004 in the Ministry of Justice as the "Minister for Democracy and Integration", and from 2004 to 2006 in the Ministry of Sustainable Development as the "Minister for Sustainable Development". In 2004, she was the Social Democratic minister for integration of refugees and her public positions indicated an opposition to proposed restrictions on asylum seekers, arguing the all refugees entering Sweden must have the same rights and obligations.

=== Social Democratic Party leadership ===
After the Social Democratic defeat in the 2006 election, Göran Persson announced his retirement as party leader on the election night. Mona Sahlin was mentioned as a possible successor, but not considered to be the most likely candidate. Both Margot Wallström and Carin Jämtin received stronger support amongst local and regional party organisations. Ulrica Messing was also mentioned as a possible candidate. Wallström, Jämtin and Messing declared however that they would not stand for the post and instead supported Sahlin, leaving Mona Sahlin as the only serious candidate. On 18 January, she was officially asked by the party's Election Committee to stand as party leader, and accepted. On 17 March, she was unanimously elected at the extra party congress in Stockholm.

In January 2007, support for the new centre-right government of Sweden had dropped greatly in the polls, which showed the left bloc (including the Green Party) as having much stronger support. This provided Mona Sahlin, as leader of the biggest opposition party, with excellent opportunities to lead the opposition against the PM Fredrik Reinfeldt. By April 2009, however, the support had waned and a Demoskop poll published in Expressen showed that the four-party Alliance claimed a combined 50 percent voter support while the Sahlin-led opposition had 45.2 percent. Later the same month a Sifo poll showed that merely 27 percent of Swedes were confident or extremely confident in her leadership ability, while the public confidence in Reinfeldt was measured at 60 percent.

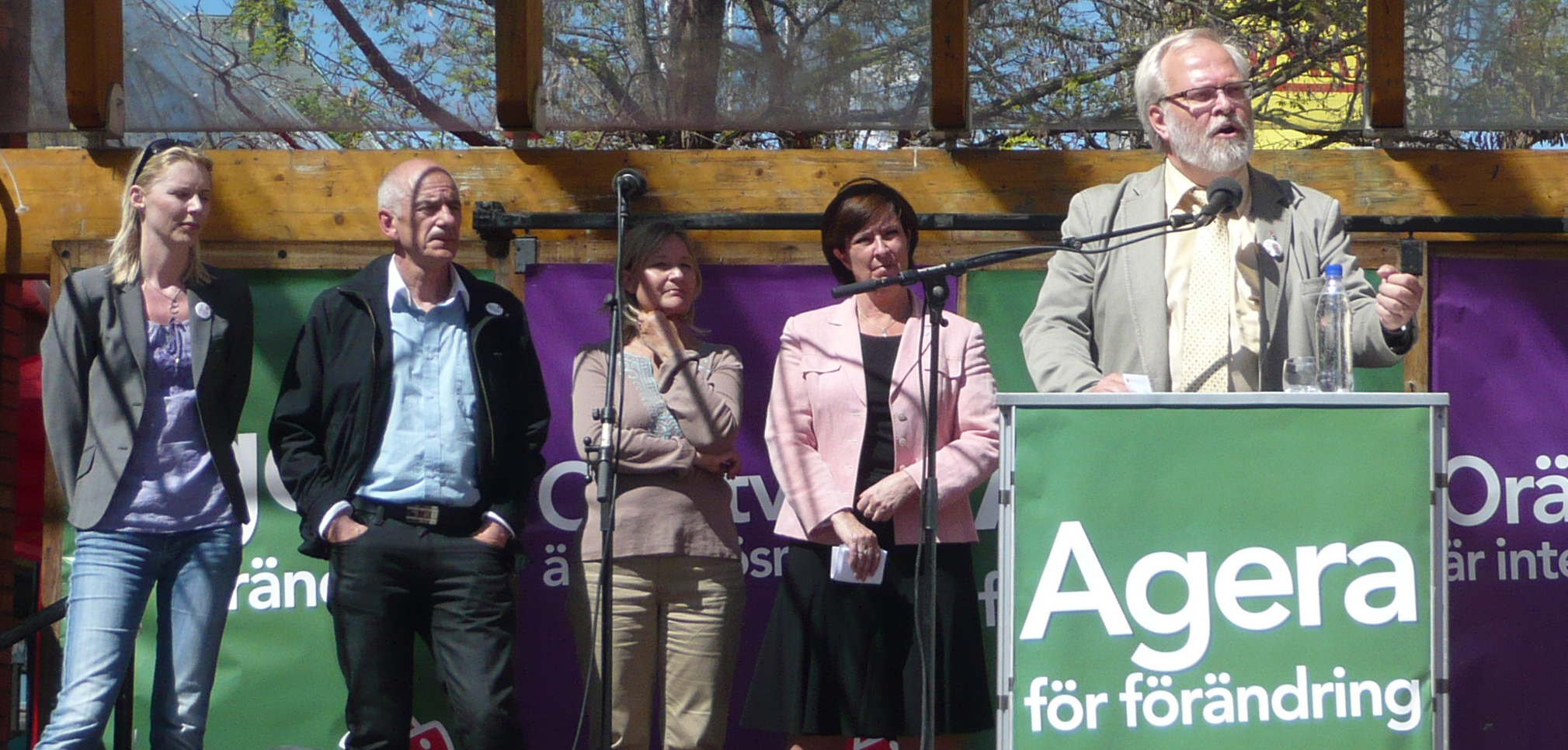
Mona Sahlin (second from the right) and the top Social Democratic Party candidates for the European Parliament elections in 2009.

Mona Sahlin is often described as a scion of the party's more moderate members, and a number of left-wing party members criticised her candidacy for party leader. Much of this criticism was silenced in January 2007 when the chairman of the Trade Union Confederation, Wanja Lundby-Wedin, expressed full support for Sahlin as well as several powerful party districts around the country. One of her key initiatives was the formation of the Red-Green alliance between the Social Democrats and the Green Party to counter the move to pare back the social welfare system and privatize state-owned assets. She is also widely hailed for having been a LGBTQ ally.

In the election to the European Parliament held on 7 June 2009 – Sahlin's first election as party leader – the Social Democratic Party received 24.41 percent of the votes (a slight reduction from the 2004 election in which the party received 24.56 percent). The result was the lowest for the Social Democratic Party since the introduction of universal suffrage in Sweden in 1921. In a speech before trade unionists during the election campaign on 12 May 2009, Sahlin said: "If there's not a plus in front of our figures it's a deep failure".

She led the Social Democratic Party in the election of September 2010 where she failed to unseat Fredrik Reinfeldt as Prime Minister. The Social Democrats received the lowest recorded percentage of the votes in their history but were still the largest party in Sweden by a slim margin in 2010. She resigned as party leader on 25 March 2011, becoming the second Social Democratic Party leader to have resigned without having served as prime minister.

Speaking in 2005 at a Swedish mosque, Sahlin said that "many Swedes are envious of immigrants because they have a culture, a history, something that binds them together. Swedes have only Midsummer Night and such silly things." Karen Jespersen, a former Minister of Integration in Denmark, commented: "Cultural self-denial cannot easily be more monstrous and ghastly." After the terrorist action in Brussels in March 2016, Sahlin, who was then serving as national coordinator against violent extremism, maintained in an op-ed that such atrocities were the fault not only of the terrorists themselves but of critics of Islam whose remarks in online chat rooms, in comments fields, and on social media "give the extremists their nourishment." Commentator Jenny Sonesson called for her to be dismissed from her position, saying that she "knows nothing about Islam." Writing in Expressen, Sakine Madon also criticized Sahlin for her refusal to address the reality of jihadism.

On 5 May 2016, Sahlin stepped down from her position as Sweden's national coordinator against violence-embracing extremism, due to revelations by the newspaper Expressen that she had lied about her bodyguard's salary, in order to help him secure a mortgage. The bodyguard had a monthly salary of SEK 43,000, but Mona Sahlin wrote a confirmation letter stating that he had a salary of SEK 120,000. When confronted with the issue, she first made a false statement that she had paid the difference out of her own pocket, before retracting the statement after it was proven by Expressen to actually be false. The media mentioned similarities to the so-called Toblerone case of the 1990s when Sahlin was caught using her government credit card to pay for private expenses and then dodging the issue when confronted.

In November 2017, Sahlin was found guilty of tax evasion. In 2015, she had failed to declare 151,072 kronor in income from writing and lecturing, and in 2016 she had failed to declare SEK 106,193. She was required to pay a fine of SEK 23,000.

== Personal life ==
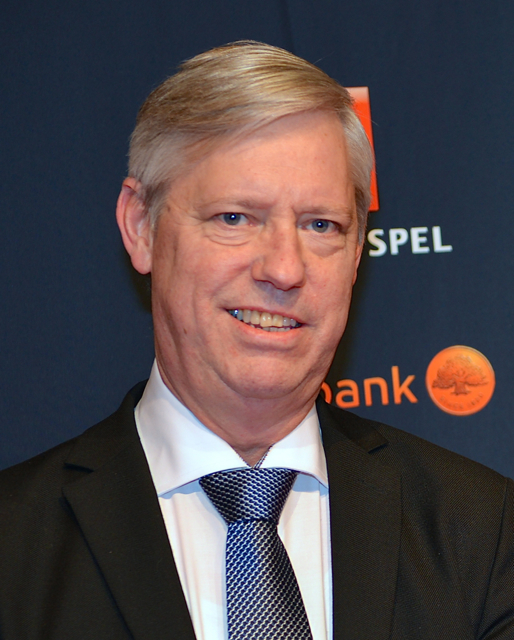
Bo Sahlin in 2014

Mona Sahlin has one brother and two sisters. Her brother, Janne Andersson, is the former lead singer of the pop group Japop and owns his own production company. Her sister Lena Ridemar is the chief of staff at the Tenants' Association.

In 1982, she married Bo Sahlin, a politician who later became the CEO of the Social Democratic media company AiP Media Produktion AB in 2006. The couple have three children: Jenny (born 1983), Gustav (born 1989), and Johan who died after ten months as a result of heart failure. She also has a child named Ann-Sofie from a previous relationship with a man named David Peña.

== Bibliography ==
- Sahlin, Mona (1996). Med mina ord. Stockholm: Rabén Prisma. ISBN 91-518-3006-X.

Political offices
Preceded by Ingela Thalén	Minister for Employment; 1990–1991	Succeeded by Börje Hörnlund
Preceded by Bengt Westerberg	Deputy Prime Minister; 1994–1995	Succeeded by Lena Hjelm-Wallén
Preceded by Bengt Westerberg	Minister for Gender Equality; 1994–1995	Succeeded by Leif Blomberg
Preceded by Margareta Winberg	Minister for Employment; 1998–2002	Succeeded by Hans Karlsson
Preceded by Ulrica Messing	Minister for Integration; 2000–2002	Succeeded by Jens Orback (Minister for Democracy, Metropolitan Affairs, Integration and Gender Equality)
Preceded by Britta Lejon (Minister for Democracy)	Minister for Democracy and Integration; 2002–2003	Succeeded by Jens Orback (Minister for Democracy, Metropolitan Affairs, Integration and Gender Equality)
Preceded by Margareta Winberg (Minister for Gender Equality)	Minister for Democracy, Integration and Gender Equality; 2003–2004	Succeeded by Jens Orback (Minister for Democracy, Metropolitan Affairs, Integration and Gender Equality)
Preceded by Lena Sommestad	Minister for the Environment; 2004–2005	Succeeded by Lena Sommestad
Preceded by Office created	Minister for Sustainable Development; 2005–2006	Succeeded by Office ceded
Party political offices
Preceded by Göran Persson	Chairman of the Swedish Social Democratic Party; 2007–2011	Succeeded by Håkan Juholt
