= Sven Hulterström =

Swedish social democrat politician (born 1938)

Minister of Communications (Transport)
- In office 1985–1989
- Prime Minister: Olof Palme; Ingvar Carlsson
- Preceded by: Curt Boström
- Succeeded by: Georg Andersson

Minister of Health and Social Affairs
- In office 1989–1990
- Prime Minister: Ingvar Carlsson

Personal details
- Born: 14 May 1938 (age 87)
- Party: Social Democratic Party

Sven Hulterström (born 14 May 1938) is a Swedish social democrat politician who held several political and government posts, including minister of communications (Transport) and minister of health and social affairs. In addition, he was a long-term member of the Riksdag.

== Biography ==
Hulterström was born on 14 May 1938. He was a member of the Swedish Social Democratic Party. He worked at the Gothenburg City Council in the period 1971–1985 and served as the chairman of the municipal board for two terms, in the periods 1976–1979 and 1982–1985. During his term Hulterström was one of the leading figures in the regionalisation process and was instrumental in the establishment of the county of Västra Götaland.

Hulterström was the minister of communications (Transport) in the period 1985–1989 and minister of health and social affairs between 1989 and 1990. The cabinets were led by first Olof Palme and then by Ingvar Carlsson.

Hulterström was elected to the Riksdag in 1985 and served there until 2002. He held several posts at the Riksdag, including the chairman of the general assembly from 1998 to 2002. In 2003 he was named as the chairman of Stokab, an infrastructure company owned by the Stockholm Municipality.

In November 2019 a book entitled Sven Hulterström – Ett liv i politikens centrum was published by the author Mats Wångersjö.
