= Georg Andersson =

Swedish politician (born 1936)

Minister of Communications (Transport)
- In office 1989–1991
- Prime Minister: Ingvar Carlsson
- Preceded by: Sven Hulterström

Minister for Immigration
- In office 10 October 1986 – 30 January 1989
- Preceded by: Anita Gradin
- Succeeded by: Maj-Lis Lööw

Personal details
- Born: Georg Leander Andersson; 3 March 1936 (age 90) Älvsby, Sweden
- Party: Social Democratic Party

Georg Leander Andersson (born 3 March 1936) is a Swedish politician and a member of the Social Democratic Party. He held various cabinet posts and was a member of the Riksdag between 1971 and 1995.

== Biography ==
Andersson was born in 1936. He joined the Social Democratic Party which he represented at the Riksdag from 1971 to 1995.

Andersson was appointed minister for immigration on 10 October 1986, replacing Anita Gradin in the post. When he was in office he openly criticized the migration policies of Sweden arguing that Sweden had not responded the applications in a fair manner and that those given permission to live in the country had not been treated as equal fellows and could not find a job. His tenure ended on 30 January 1989, and he was succeeded by Maj-Lis Lööw in the post.

He was minister of communications (transport) between 1989 and 1991 in the first and second cabinets of Prime Minister Ingvar Carlsson. During his term Andersson visited Seoul in 1989. Sweden and Denmark signed an agreement to build the Øresund Bridge on 23 March 1991 when he was serving as the minister of communications. He also served as the governor of Västerbotten. He lives in Umeå.
