= Minister for Integration (Sweden) =

Swedish cabinet position

- Integrationsminister
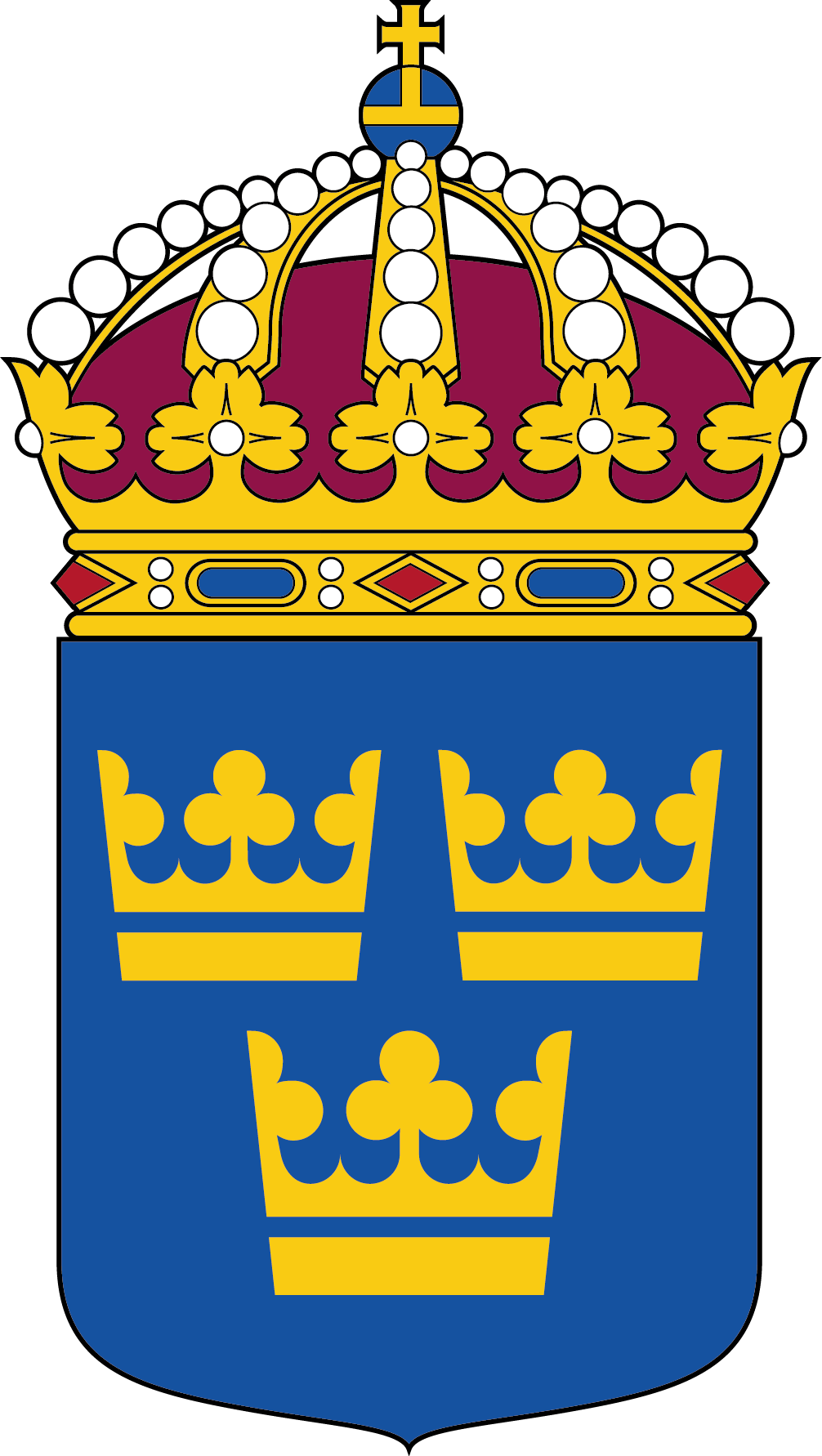

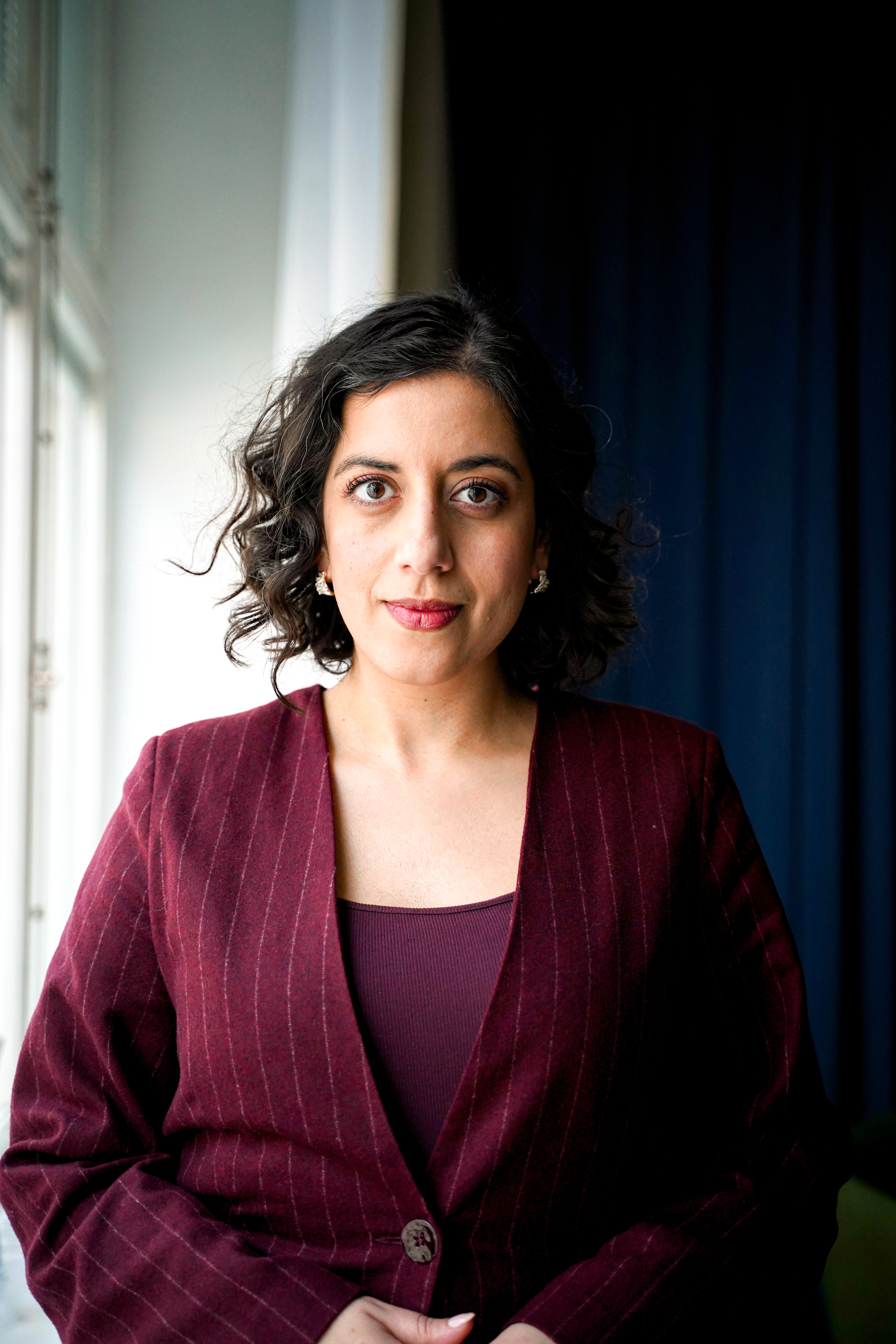
- Incumbent; Simona Mohamsson since 28 June 2025
- Appointer: The Prime Minister
- Inaugural holder: Leif Blomberg
- Formation: 1996
- Website: www.sweden.gov.se

The Minister for Integration (Swedish: Integrationsminister) is a cabinet minister within the Swedish Government since 2021, having previously been so between 1996 and 2014. The cabinet minister was appointed by the Prime Minister of Sweden.

The minister was responsible for issues regarding integration, discrimination, human rights at the national level, Swedish citizenship and minorities. The last Minister for Integration was Erik Ullenhag, who served from 2010 to 2014.

When the Andersson Cabinet took office in November 2021, the minister post was re-established. It was placed at the Ministry of Justice, and combined with Minister of Migration. Since June 2025, the position is placed at the Ministry for Education and the current minister is Simona Mohamsson of the Liberals.

== List of ministers for integration ==
No.	Portrait	Minister for Integration	Took office	Left office	Time in office	Party	Prime Minister
1	Leif Blomberg	Leif Blomberg (1941–1998)	22 March 1996	2 March 1998 †	1 year, 345 days	Social Democrats	Göran Persson (S)
2	Lars Engqvist	Lars Engqvist (born 1945)	2 March 1998	October 1998	214	Social Democrats	Göran Persson (S)
3	Ulrica Messing	Ulrica Messing (born 1968)	October 1998	2000	731	Social Democrats	Göran Persson (S)
4	Mona Sahlin	Mona Sahlin (born 1957)	2000	21 October 2004	1,461	Social Democrats	Göran Persson (S)
5	Jens Orback	Jens Orback (born 1959)	21 October 2004	5 October 2006	714	Social Democrats	Göran Persson (S)
6	Nyamko Sabuni	Nyamko Sabuni (born 1969)	6 October 2006	5 October 2010	3 years, 364 days	Liberals	Fredrik Reinfeldt (M)
7	Erik Ullenhag	Erik Ullenhag (born 1972)	6 October 2010	3 October 2014	3 years, 362 days	Liberals	Fredrik Reinfeldt (M)
8	Anders Ygeman	Anders Ygeman (born 1972)	30 November 2021	18 October 2022	322 days	Social Democrats	Magdalena Andersson (S)
9	Johan Pehrson	Johan Pehrson (born 1968)	18 October 2022	10 September 2024	1 year, 328 days	Liberals	Ulf Kristersson (M)
10	Mats Persson	Mats Persson (born 1980)	10 September 2024	28 June 2025	291 days	Liberals	Ulf Kristersson (M)
11	Simona Mohamsson	Simona Mohamsson (born 1994)	28 June 2025	Incumbent	1 year, 94 days	Liberals	Ulf Kristersson (M)

== Ministry history ==
The office of Minister for Integration was under several different ministries from its founding in 1996 to its abolishment in 2014. The office was re-established in 2021.

Ministry	Term
Ministry of the Interior	1996–1998
Ministry of Culture	1998–2000
Ministry of Justice	2000–2006
Ministry of Integration and Gender Equality	2006–2010
Ministry of Employment	2010–2014
Ministry of Justice	2021–2022
Ministry of Employment	2022–2025
Ministry of Education	2025–

== See also ==
- Minister for Immigration
- Minister for Migration
