= Minister for Gender Equality (Sweden) =

Swedish cabinet position

- Jämställdhetsminister
- Lesser coat of arms of Sweden

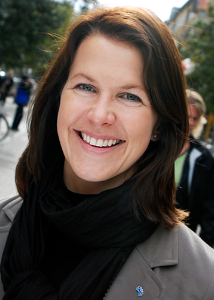
- Incumbent; Nina Larsson since 1 April 2025
- Member of: The Government
- Appointer: The Prime Minister
- Inaugural holder: Ulla Lindström
- Formation: 1954
- Website: www.sweden.gov.se

The Minister for Gender Equality (Swedish: Jämställdhetsministern) is a cabinet minister within the Swedish Government and appointed by the Prime Minister of Sweden.

The minister is responsible for issues regarding gender equality, popular education and policies for the civil society. The current Minister for Gender Equality is Nina Larsson, appointed on 1 April 2025.

== List of ministers for gender equality ==
Name	Term	Political party	Prime Minister
Ulla Lindström	1954–1966	Social Democrats	Tage Erlander
Camilla Odhnoff	1966–1973	Social Democrats	Tage Erlander
Camilla Odhnoff	1966–1973	Social Democrats	Olof Palme
Anna-Greta Leijon	1973–1976	Social Democrats	Olof Palme
Eva Winther	1978–1979	Liberal People's Party	Ola Ullsten
Karin Andersson	1979–1982	Centre Party	Thorbjörn Fälldin
Anita Gradin	1982–1986	Social Democrats	Olof Palme
Anna-Greta Leijon	1986–1987	Social Democrats	Ingvar Carlsson
Ingela Thalén	1987–1989	Social Democrats	Ingvar Carlsson
Maj-Lis Lööw	1989–1991	Social Democrats	Ingvar Carlsson
Birgit Friggebo	1991–1993	Liberal People's Party	Carl Bildt
Bengt Westerberg	1993–1994	Liberal People's Party	Carl Bildt
Mona Sahlin	1994–1995	Social Democrats	Ingvar Carlsson
Marita Ulvskog	1995–1996	Social Democrats	Ingvar Carlsson
Ulrica Messing	1996–1998	Social Democrats	Göran Persson
Margareta Winberg	1998–2003	Social Democrats	Göran Persson
Mona Sahlin	2003–2004	Social Democrats	Göran Persson
Jens Orback	2004–2006	Social Democrats	Göran Persson
Nyamko Sabuni	2006–2013	Liberal People's Party	Fredrik Reinfeldt
Maria Arnholm	2013–2014	Liberal People's Party	Fredrik Reinfeldt
Åsa Regnér	2014–2018	Social Democrats	Stefan Löfven
Lena Hallengren	2018–2019	Social Democrats	Stefan Löfven
Åsa Lindhagen	2019–2021	Green Party	Stefan Löfven
Märta Stenevi	2021	Green Party	Stefan Löfven
Eva Nordmark	2021–2022	Social Democrats	Magdalena Andersson
Paulina Brandberg	2022–2025	The Liberals	Ulf Kristersson
Nina Larsson	2025–	The Liberals	Ulf Kristersson

== Ministry history ==
The office of Minister for Gender Equality have been under several different ministries since its founding in 1954.

Ministry	Term
Ministry of the Interior	1954–1973
Ministry of Employment	1973–1976
Ministry of Employment	1978–1991
Ministry of Culture	1991–1993
Ministry of Health and Social Affairs	1993–1994
Prime Minister's Office	1994–1995
Ministry for Civil Service Affairs	1995–1996
Ministry of Employment	1996–1998
Ministry of Agriculture	1998–2003
Ministry of Justice	2004–2006
Ministry of Integration and Gender Equality	2006–2010
Ministry of Education	2010–2014
Ministry of Health and Social Affairs	2014–2019
Ministry of Employment	2019–

== See also ==
- Minister for Women and Equalities – Position in the United Kingdom
