= Karin Andersson (politician) =

Swedish politician (1918–2012)

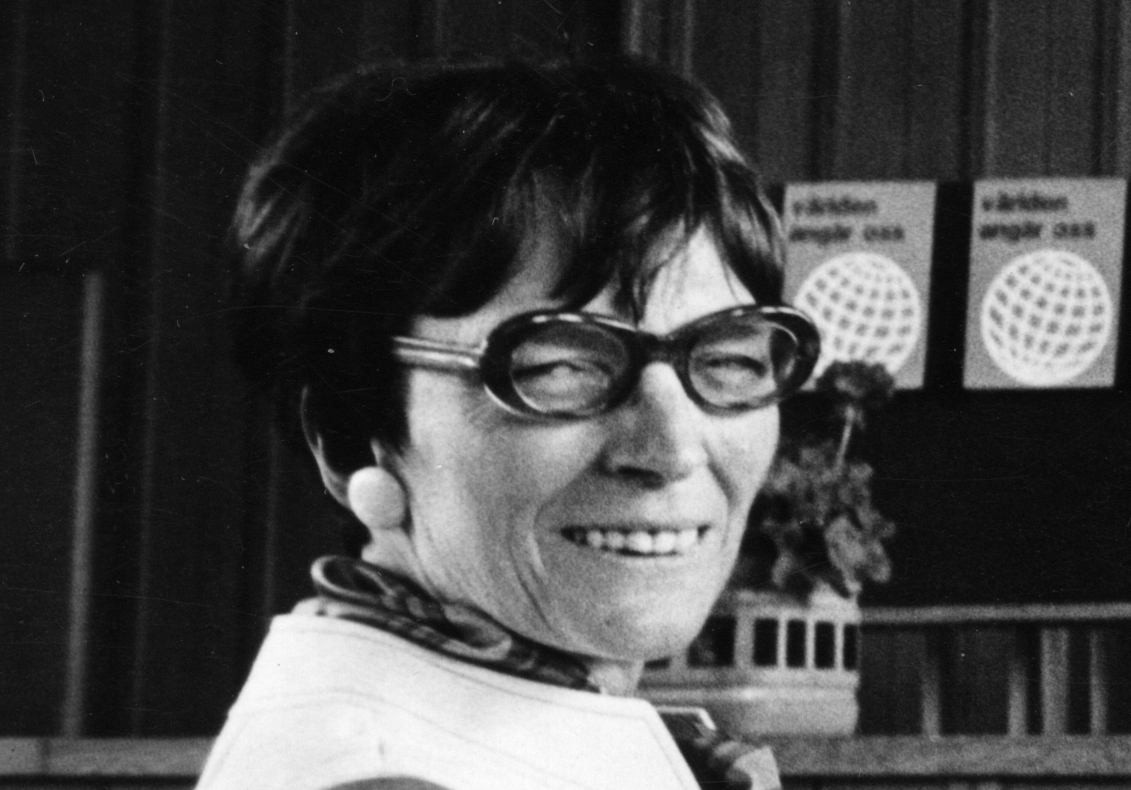

Minister for Gender Equality
- In office 12 October 1979 – 8 October 1982
- Preceded by: Eva Winther
- Succeeded by: Anita Gradin

Member of the Riksdag
- In office 1971–1985

Personal details
- Born: Karin Elizabet Andersson; 8 October 1918 Veddige, Sweden
- Died: July 20, 2012 (aged 93) Ås, Varberg Municipality, Sweden
- Party: Centre Party

Karin Elizabet Andersson (8 October 1918 – 20 July 2012) was a Swedish politician who served as Minister for Gender Equality from 1979 to 1982. Born into a farm family as one of six children, her father Elias served as municipal councillor in Varberg Municipality. She began working for Hallands Nyheter as a journalist in 1947, then worked for Ålandstidningen until 1957. In the 1960s, Andersson worked with Sveriges Radio, and also began to get involved with the Centre Party, and became the party's federal secretary in 1966, serving in that position until 1979.

In 1966, Andersson was elected to Stockholm City Council, and in 1971 she became a member of the Riksdag, serving until 1985. In 1979, she was named Minister for Gender Equality under Prime Minister Thorbjörn Fälldin. She had originally planned to step down from the Riksdag and turn down the position, but eventually accepted, and served as Minister until 1982. As Minister, her focus was on gender equality in the workforce, but also on issue pertaining to immigrants and refugees entering the country. After leaving politics behind, she retired to her farm in Halland, where she spent the rest of her life.
