= Börje Hörnlund =

Swedish politician

Börje Hörnlund (born 17 June 1935) is a Swedish retired politician. He was a member of the Centre Party. Hörnlund was minister for employment between 1991 and 1994.
