= Ulla Lindström =

Swedish journalist and politician

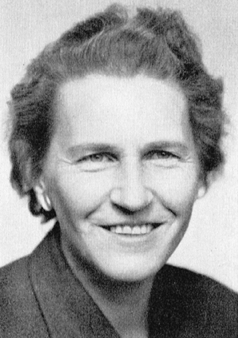

Minister of Family- Consumption- Aid and Immigration
- In office 1954–1966

Personal details
- Born: 15 September 1909 Kungsholmen Parish, Stockholm, Sweden
- Died: 10 July 1999 (aged 89) Enskede Parish, Stockholm, Sweden
- Party: Social Democrat

Ulla Gunilla Lindström, née Wohlin (15 September 1909 in Stockholm – 10 July 1999) was a Swedish journalist and politician (Social Democrat). She was Minister of Family, Consumer, Aid and Refugee Affairs from 1954 to 1966. She was also the first woman in Sweden to be acting Prime Minister (1958).

== Biography ==
Ulla Lindström was born in Stockholm to right-wing Nils Wohlin, the Minister of Trade in 1923–1924 and Minister of Finance in 1928–1929, and piano teacher Gunilla Wohlin. Her parents divorced when she was ten, and she grew up with her mother. She graduated as a teacher in 1933, and worked as the editor of the newspapers Sveriges folkskollärarinnors tidning from 1934 to 1946, and Vår bostad from 1937 to 1946. She became a social democrat as a student, and was the chairperson of the social democratic women's club Allmänna kvinnoklubben in Stockholm from 1935 to 1945 and an elected member of the Stockholm city council from 1942 to 1945. She was a member of parliament from 1946 to 1970 and a consultant in the Trade department from 1947 to 1954. Lindström was a delegate of the United Nations General Assembly 1947–1966, and chairperson of Rädda Barnen 1971–1989.

Lindström served as Minister of Family, Consumption, Aid and Refugee Affairs from 1954 to 1966. Her appointment was encouraged by the Social Democratic Women, who demanded female representation on all levels, a demand which Tage Erlander wished to fulfill. During her tenure, she was the only woman in the government, and unusual as a female minister not only in Sweden but also internationally. Her appointment was very popular among women, and she continued being popular among women during her tenure. Personally, she believed that she was not the only woman who deserved a place in the government, and she was disappointed that she continued to be the only one of her gender in the government during her tenure, despite the fact that she repeatedly suggested that Inga Thorsson deserved to receive a ministerial post.

Lindström was controversial and caused great attention in the media when she refused to curtsey to Queen Elizabeth II in 1956: this was reported in international press, and regarded as an insult by royalists, and as a demonstration of equality in the eyes of others. In 1958, she served as acting Prime minister of Sweden during the summer break of Prime Minister Tage Erlander, becoming the first woman to serve in that function. She resigned under protest in 1966 when the government did not fulfil their promise of an increased aid.

She was awarded the Illis quorum in 1978.
