= Jens Orback =

Swedish politician (born 1959)

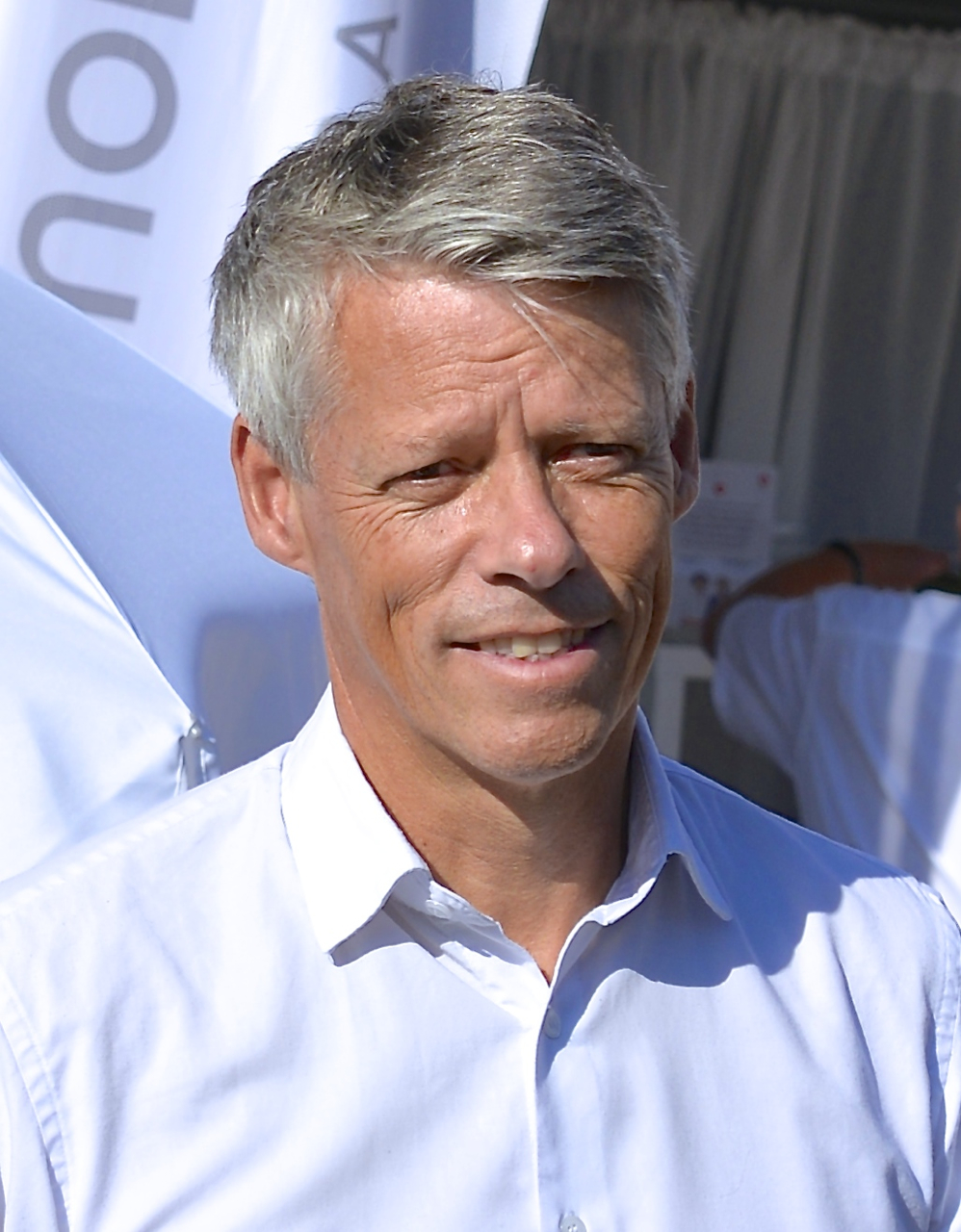

Minister for Democracy, Metropolitan Affairs, Integration, and Gender Equality
- In office 2004–2006

Personal details
- Born: 21 April 1959; Stockholm, Sweden
- Political party: Social Democratic

Jens Olov Heinrich Orback (born 21 April 1959 in Stockholm) is a Swedish Social Democratic politician. He was Minister for Democracy, Metropolitan Affairs, Integration, and Gender Equality in the Ministry of Justice in the Cabinet of Göran Persson (2004-2006).

Jens Orback graduated from Stockholm University in 1985 with a Bachelor of Science in Economics. He was active in the Swedish Social Democratic Youth League at a local level, and worked in the Ministry of Finance in the late 1980s, before embarking on a career as a television journalist with the public service channels of Sveriges Television. In 2002, he returned to local politics in Stockholm, serving as the chair of the council of Maria-Gamla Stan borough until he became a minister on 1 November 2004.

Between 2008 and 2016 he was the Secretary General of the Olof Palme International Center, after which his currently works as Executive Director of the Global Challenges Foundation
