= Leif Blomberg =

Swedish union leader and politician (1941–1998)

Personal details
- Born: Leif Göran Blomberg; 15 February 1941 Enköping, Sweden
- Died: 2 March 1998 (aged 57) Gothenburg, Sweden
- Party: Social Democratic Party
- Children: 3
- Occupation: Trade unionist

Leif Göran Blomberg (15 February 1941 – 2 March 1998) was a politician and the head of Swedish Metal Workers' Confederation. He was a member of the Social Democratic Party. He held several government posts.

== Biography ==
Blomberg was born in Enköping on 15 February 1941. He was the chairman of the Swedish Metal Workers' Confederation in the period 1982–1993. Shortly after his appointment as the chairman of the confederation it abandoned the main agreements of the Swedish Trade Union allies in 1983. At the beginning the 1990s Blomberg was a member of the advisory committee on the European Community formed by the Prime Minister Ingvar Carlsson.

In 1994 Blomberg was appointed the minister for immigration to the cabinet led by Prime Minister Ingvar Carlsson. He was the minister for integration between 22 March 1996 and 2 March 1998 in the cabinet led by Göran Persson. He also served as the minister for consumer affairs during the same period.

Blomberg was married and had three children. He died in Gothenburg on 2 March 1998 when he was in office.
