= Maj-Lis Lööw =

Swedish politician (born 1936)

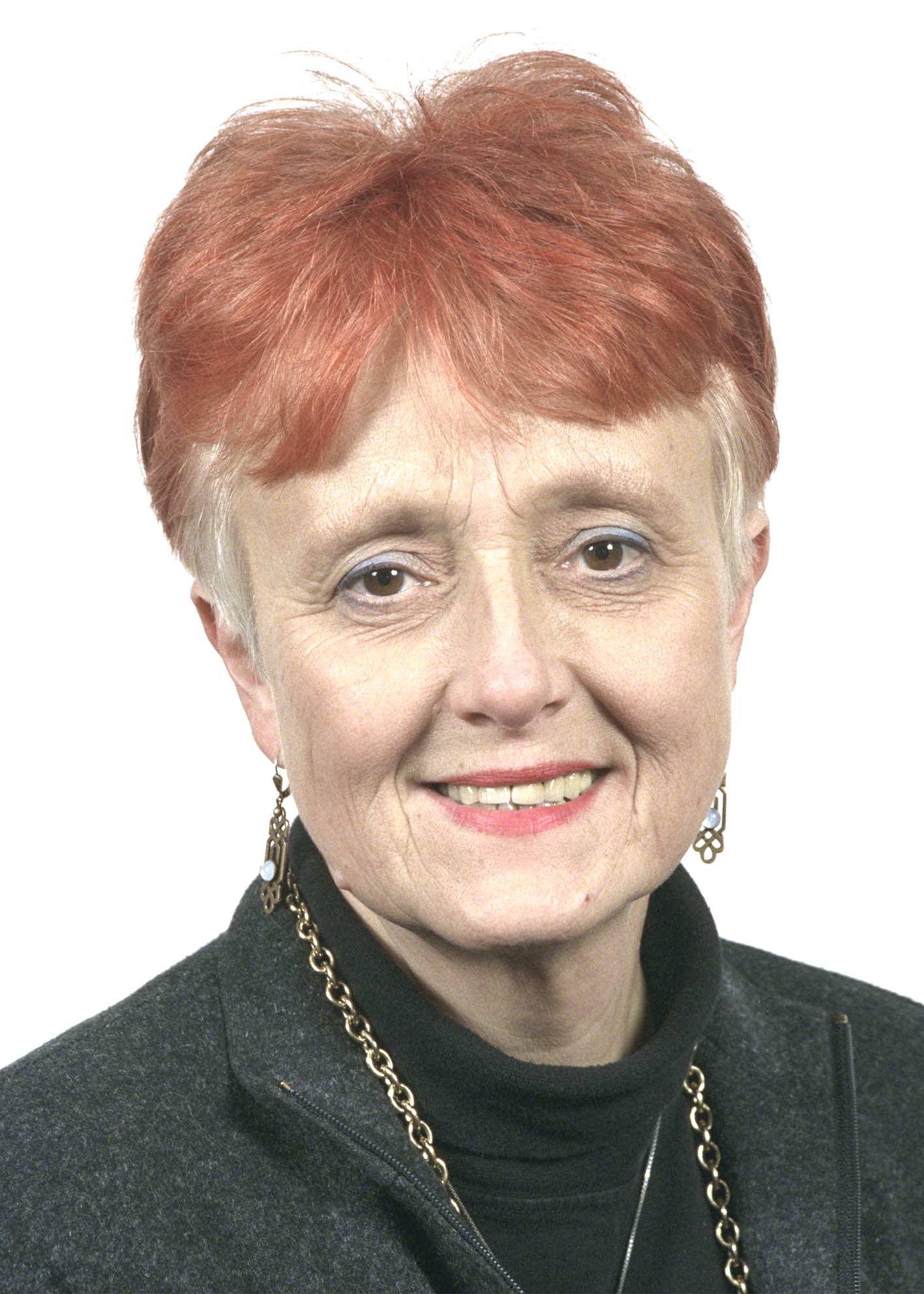
- Official portrait as a Member of the European Parliament, 1995

Minister for Immigration
- In office 30 January 1989 – 4 October 1991
- Prime Minister: Ingvar Carlsson
- Preceded by: Georg Andersson
- Succeeded by: Birgit Friggebo

Minister of Gender Equality
- In office 30 January 1989 – 4 October 1991
- Prime Minister: Ingvar Carlsson
- Preceded by: Ingela Thalén
- Succeeded by: Birgit Friggebo

Personal details
- Born: 13 August 1936 (age 90) Eskilstuna, Sweden
- Party: Social Democratic Party

Maj-Lis Lööw (born 13 August 1936) is a former Swedish Social Democratic Party politician who served as the minister for immigration and minister of gender equality between 1989 and 1991 in the cabinets of Prime Minister Ingvar Carlsson. She was also a member of the Swedish Parliament and the European Parliament.

== Biography ==
Lööw was born in Eskilstuna on 13 August 1936. She was a member of the Social Democratic Party and the chair of the Social Democratic Women in Sweden in the period 1981–1990. She served at the Swedish Parliament for the Social Democratic Party between 1979 and 1995. On 30 January 1989 Lööw was appointed minister for immigration, replacing Georg Andersson in the post.

In the same period Lööw was also the minister of gender equality. His tenure ended on 4 October 1991. She resigned from the Swedish Parliament in 1995 and served at the European Parliament as part of the Party of European Socialists of which she was vice president from 1995 and 1997. Her term at the European Parliament ended in 1999.
