= Eva Winther =

Swedish politician (1921–2014)

Minister for Immigration and Gender Equality
- In office 18 October 1978 – 12 October 1979
- Prime Minister: Ola Ullsten

Personal details
- Born: 3 August 1921 Stockholm, Sweden
- Died: 26 May 2014 (aged 92) Kungsbacka, Sweden
- Resting place: Skogskyrkogården, Stockholm, Sweden
- Party: Liberal People's party
- Children: 3
- Occupation: Paediatric nurse

Signe Inger Eva Winther (née Fornander; 3 August 1921 – 26 May 2014) was a Swedish Liberal People's party politician She entered politics in 1966, representing the Liberal People's party on the Kiruna town council. She was then a member of the Norrbotten county council and was elected to the Swedish parliament in the 1976 election. She was the minister for immigration and gender equality in the period 1978–1979. After losing her parliamentary seat in the 1982 election, she became a member of the Halland county council, for which she was deputy chair for three years.

== Early life and education ==
She was born in Stockholm on 3 August 1921 to Captain Martin Fornander and Gunhild Fornander. She received education in the field of paediatric nursing.

== Career ==
Winther started her political career when she was elected to the Kiruna town council from the Liberal People's party in 1966 and remained in the post until 1976. Then she became a member of the Norrbotten county council and was elected to the Swedish parliament in the 1976 election. At the parliament she served as the chair of the labour market committee (1977–1978) and then as a member of the same committee (1979–1982). On 18 October 1978 Winther was named as the minister for migration and gender equality as part of the cabinet led by Prime Minister Ola Ullsten, and she remained in the office until 12 October 1979. She served at the parliament until 1982. Then she became a member of the Halland county council in the period 1985–1991 and was the deputy chair of the council from 1988 to 1991.

== Personal life and death ==
Winther was married and had three children, a son and two daughters. She died in Kungsbacka on 26 May 2014 and was buried at the Skogskyrkogården cemetery in Stockholm.
