= Ulf Lönnqvist =

Swedish politician (1936–2022)

Minister of Housing
- In office 1988–1991
- Prime Minister: Ingvar Carlsson

Minister of Sports, Youth and Tourism
- In office 1986–1989
- Prime Minister: Ingvar Carlsson

Personal details
- Born: Ulf Roland Lönnqvist; 26 June 1936 Malmö, Sweden
- Died: 24 June 2022 (aged 85)
- Party: Social Democratic Party
- Education: Lund University

Ulf Lönnqvist (26 June 1936 – 24 June 2022) was a Swedish social democratic politician who held several government posts and was a member of the Swedish Parliament.

== Biography ==
Lönnqvist was born in Malmö on 26 June 1936. He was a graduate of Lund University.

Following his graduation Lönnqvist moved to Tyresö to work at the department of chancellor. He served at the Parliament for the Social Democratic Party between 1985 and 1992. He was appointed minister of sports, youth and tourism in 1986 and remained in the post until 1989. As of 1986 he was also the state secretary at the Ministry of Agriculture under Svante Lundkvist. Lönnqvist was the minister of housing from 1988 to 1991. Between 1992 and 2001 he served as governor of Blekinge County.

Lönnqvist was married and had a daughter. He died on 24 June 2022.
