= Camilla Odhnoff =

Swedish politician (1928–2013)

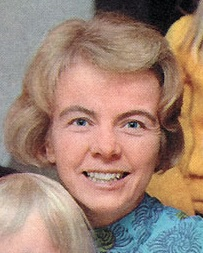

Governor of Blekinge County
- In office 1974–1992

Personal details
- Born: Elna Camilla Wilske; 6 June 1928 Gothenburg, Sweden
- Died: 16 July 2013 (aged 85) Lund, Sweden
- Party: Social Democrat

Elna Camilla Odhnoff (née Wilske; 6 June 1928 – 16 July 2013) was a Swedish Social Democrat politician. She served as Minister without portfolio responsible for Family, Youth and Immigration in 1967–1974. She served as the Governor of Blekinge County in 1974–1992 and was the first female governor in Sweden. She was born in Gamlestaden, Gothenburg.

== Early life ==
Odhnoff was born Elna Camilla Wilske on 6 June 1928 in Gothenburg, Sweden, the daughter of director of studies (studierektor) Gustaf Wilske and his wife Olga Maria Åkerman. She rreiceved a Ph.D. in 1961.

== Career ==
Odhnoff was an amanuensis and assistant lecturer at the Department of Plant Physiology at Lund University from 1954 to 1961, and became a docent in physiological botany at Lund University in 1962. She held a docent position from 1962 to 1966 and a research position funded by the Swedish National Bank Fund (Riksbanksfonden) from 1966. She served as acting professor periodically between 1959 and 1965.

She conducted research in plant physiology at the University of Pretoria, South Africa, in 1952–1953, Princeton University, USA, in 1962, and the University of Wisconsin, USA, in 1963.

She has served as a minister without portfolio to the government from 1967.

She has been a member of the board of the Lund Workers' Municipal Association (Lunds arbetarekommun) since 1963, a member of the executive committee of the Social Democratic Women's District Organization of Scania from 1964, and chair of the Lund Social Democratic Women's Club from 1966. From 1967, she has also been a member of the Lund City Council and the Malmöhus County Council.

== Personal life ==
In 1954, Wilske married Jan Odhnoff (1931–2025), a docent and PhD. They had four children: Petter (born 1956), Sissela (Sula) (born 1958), Jonas (born 1959), and Anna (born 1963).
