= Lena Hjelm-Wallén =

Swedish politician (born 1943)

Acting Minister for Defence
- In office 30 September 2002 – 21 October 2002
- Prime Minister: Göran Persson
- Preceded by: Björn von Sydow
- Succeeded by: Pär Nuder (Acting)

Acting Minister for Justice
- In office 21 September 2000 – 11 October 2000
- Prime Minister: Göran Persson
- Preceded by: Laila Freivalds
- Succeeded by: Thomas Bodström

Deputy Prime Minister of Sweden
- In office 10 November 1995 – 21 October 2002
- Prime Minister: Ingvar Carlsson; Göran Persson
- Preceded by: Mona Sahlin
- Succeeded by: Margareta Winberg
- In office 16 February 1990 – 27 February 1990; Acting
- Prime Minister: Ingvar Carlsson
- Preceded by: Kjell-Olof Feldt (Acting)
- Succeeded by: Odd Engström

Minister for Foreign Affairs
- In office 7 October 1994 – 7 October 1998
- Prime Minister: Ingvar Carlsson; Göran Persson
- Preceded by: Margaretha af Ugglas
- Succeeded by: Anna Lindh

Minister for International Development Cooperation
- In office 17 October 1985 – 4 October 1991
- Prime Minister: Olof Palme; Ingvar Carlsson
- Preceded by: Ola Ullsten
- Succeeded by: Alf Svensson

Minister for Education
- In office 8 October 1982 – 17 October 1985
- Prime Minister: Olof Palme
- Preceded by: Jan-Erik Wikström
- Succeeded by: Lennart Bodström

Minister for Schools
- In office 4 January 1974 – 8 October 1976
- Prime Minister: Olof Palme
- Preceded by: Position established
- Succeeded by: Britt Mogård

Personal details
- Born: 14 January 1943 (age 83) Sala, Sweden
- Party: Social Democratic
- Spouse: Ingvar Wallén
- Education: Uppsala University
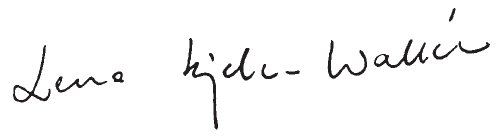
- Signature

Lena Birgitta Hjelm-Wallén (born 14 January 1943) is a Swedish politician. In 1968 Hjelm-Wallén became a member of the Swedish Parliament (Riksdag) and she held several cabinet positions, starting in 1974 as the youngest minister to that date. A member of the Social Democratic party, she served as Minister for Education from 1982 to 1985, as Minister for Foreign Affairs from 1994 to 1998 and as deputy prime minister from 1995 to 2002.

She has served as chair of the governing board of the International Institute for Democracy and Electoral Assistance (IDEA), an intergovernmental organisation with 25 member states whose objective is supporting sustainable democratic change worldwide.

Political offices
New office	Minister for Schools; 1974–1976	Succeeded by Britt Mogård
Preceded by Jan-Erik Wikström	Minister for Education; 1982–1985	Succeeded by Lennart Bodström
New office	Minister for International Development Cooperation; 1985–1991	Succeeded by Britt Mogård
Preceded by Kjell-Olof Feldt; Acting	Deputy Prime Minister of Sweden; Acting; 1990	Succeeded by Odd Engström
Preceded by Margaretha af Ugglas	Minister for Foreign Affairs; 1994–1998	Succeeded by Anna Lindh
Preceded by Gun Hellsvik	Minister for Justice; 1988–1991	Succeeded by Gun Hellsvik
Preceded by Mona Sahlin	Deputy Prime Minister of Sweden; 1995–2002	Succeeded by Margareta Winberg
Preceded by Laila Freivalds	Minister for Justice; Acting; 2000	Succeeded by Thomas Bodström
Preceded by Björn von Sydow	Minister for Defence; Acting; 2002	Succeeded by Pär Nuder; Acting
