= Carlsson III cabinet =

Cabinet and Government of Sweden 1994–1996

Carlsson's Third Cabinet
- 50th Cabinet of Sweden

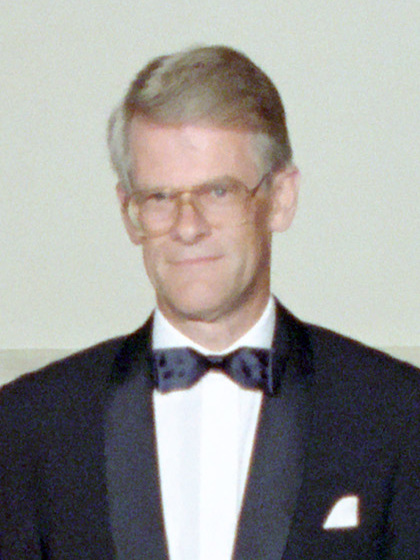
- Prime Minister Ingvar Carlsson
- Date formed: 7 October 1994
- Date dissolved: 22 March 1996

People and organisations
- Monarch: Carl XVI Gustaf
- Prime Minister: Ingvar Carlsson
- Member party: Social Democrats
- Status in legislature: Single-party minority with confidence and supply from Left Party (1994–1995) with confidence and supply from Centre Party (1995–1996)
- Opposition parties: Moderate Party; Centre Party (1994–1995); Liberal People's Party; Left Party (1995–1996); Green Party; Christian Democrats
- Opposition leader: Carl Bildt (M)

History
- Incoming formation: 1994 election
- Outgoing formation: Retirement of Ingvar Carlsson
- Election: 1994 election
- Legislature terms: 1994–1998
- Predecessor: Carl Bildt
- Successor: Persson

The Carlsson III cabinet (Swedish: regeringen Carlsson III) was the government of Sweden from 7 October 1994 to 22 March 1996. It was a Social Democratic single-party minority government led by Prime Minister Ingvar Carlsson. Carlsson had previously been prime minister from 1986 until his defeat in the 1991 general election.

The cabinet was installed following the 1994 general election and resigned as Ingvar Carlsson retired from political life. It was replaced by the likewise Social Democratic Persson cabinet.

== Ministers ==
Portfolio	Minister	Took office	Left office	Party
Prime Minister	Ingvar Carlsson	7 October 1994	22 March 1996	Social Democrats
Deputy Prime Minister	Mona Sahlin	7 October 1994	10 November 1995	Social Democrats
Deputy Prime Minister	Lena Hjelm-Wallén	10 November 1995	22 March 1996	Social Democrats
Minister for Foreign Affairs	Lena Hjelm-Wallén	7 October 1994	22 March 1996	Social Democrats
Minister for Finance	Göran Persson	7 October 1994	22 March 1996	Social Democrats
Minister for Education	Carl Tham	7 October 1994	22 March 1996	Social Democrats
Minister for Justice	Laila Freivalds	7 October 1994	22 March 1996	Social Democrats
Minister for Health and Social Affairs	Ingela Thalén	7 October 1994	22 March 1996	Social Democrats
Minister for Employment	Anders Sundström	7 October 1994	22 March 1996	Social Democrats
Minister for Agriculture	Margareta Winberg	7 October 1994	22 March 1996	Social Democrats
Minister for Defence	Thage G. Peterson	7 October 1994	22 March 1996	Social Democrats
Minister for Communications	Ines Uusmann	7 October 1994	22 March 1996	Social Democrats
Minister for Civil Service Affairs	Marita Ulvskog	7 October 1994	22 March 1996	Social Democrats
Minister for Housing	Jörgen Andersson	7 October 1994	22 March 1996	Social Democrats
Minister for the Environment	Anna Lindh	7 October 1994	22 March 1996	Social Democrats
Minister for Enterprise	Sten Heckscher	7 October 1994	5 February 1996	Social Democrats
Minister for Enterprise	Jörgen Andersson	5 February 1996	22 March 1996	Social Democrats
Minister for Culture	Margot Wallström	7 October 1994	22 March 1996	Social Democrats
Ministers without portfolio
Coordination	Jan Nygren	7 October 1994	22 March 1996	Social Democrats
International Development Cooperation	Pierre Schori	7 October 1994	22 March 1996	Social Democrats
Minister of Foreign Trade	Mats Hellström	7 October 1994	22 March 1996	Social Democrats
Social Security	Anna Hedborg	7 October 1994	22 March 1996	Social Democrats
Schools	Ylva Johansson	7 October 1994	22 March 1996	Social Democrats
Migration	Leif Blomberg	7 October 1994	22 March 1996	Social Democrats

Preceded by Carl Bildt cabinet	Cabinet of Sweden; 1994–1996	Succeeded by Persson cabinet
