= Erik Åsbrink =

Swedish politician

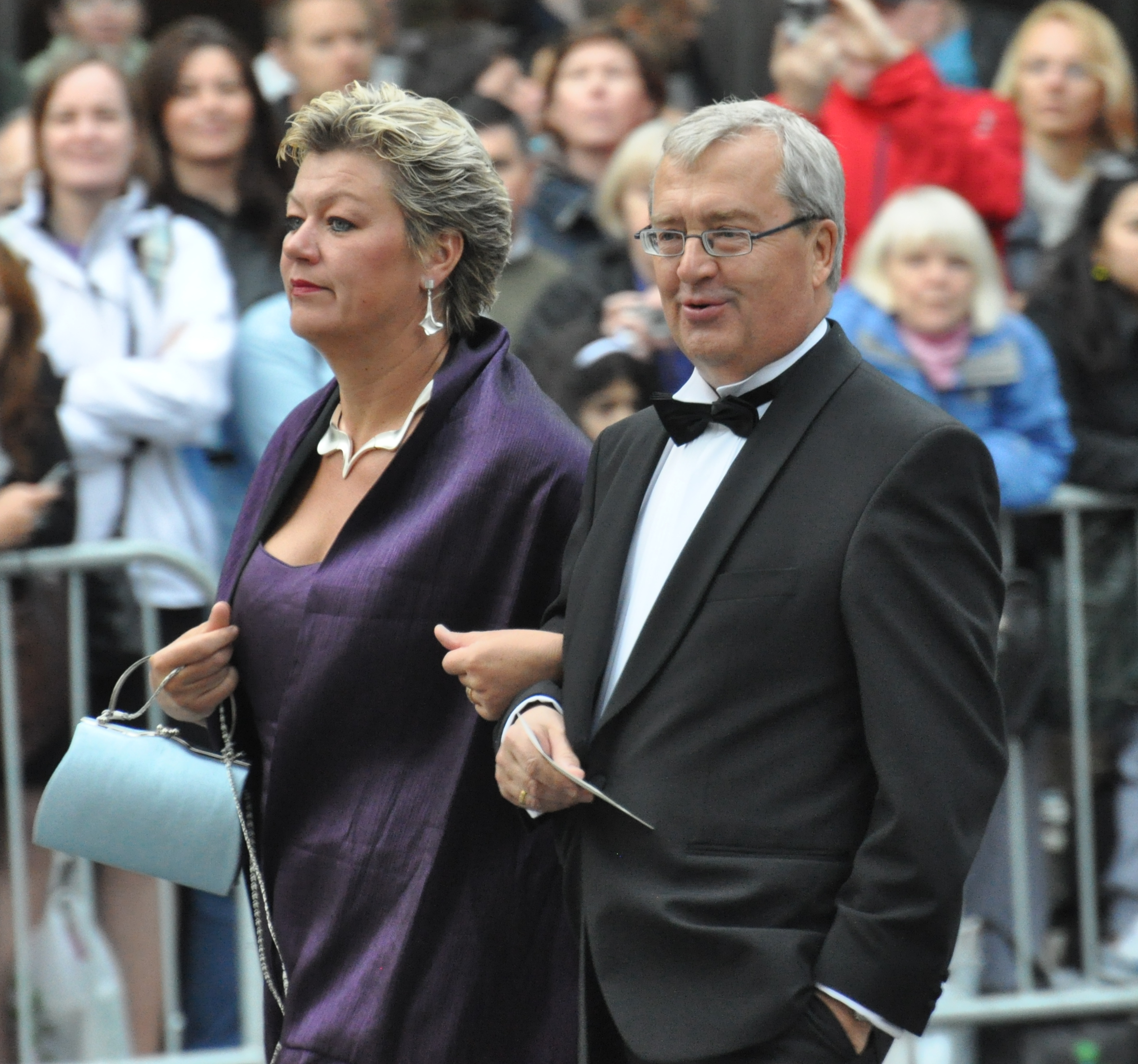
- Erik Åsbrink in 2010 (right)

Member of Parliament
- In office 1996–1999

Erik Åsbrink (born 1 February 1947) is a Swedish politician and former minister in two Social Democratic governments led by Ingvar Carlsson and Göran Persson. Later Åsbrink took part in shaping the informal guidelines called the 'business code of ethics'. Since July 2011 Åsbrink has been an international advisor to Goldman Sachs. In this position Åsbrink gives the bank strategic consultancy on growth opportunities in Sweden and the Nordic countries.

Åsbrink is married to fellow politician Ylva Johansson since 2002. They separated in 2015.

Preceded by Odd Engström	Deputy Minister for Finance; 1990–1991	Succeeded by Bo Lundgren
Preceded by Göran Persson	Minister for Finance; 1996–1999	Succeeded by Bosse Ringholm
