= Minister for Schools (Sweden) =

Swedish cabinet position

- Skolminister
- Lesser coat of arms of Sweden

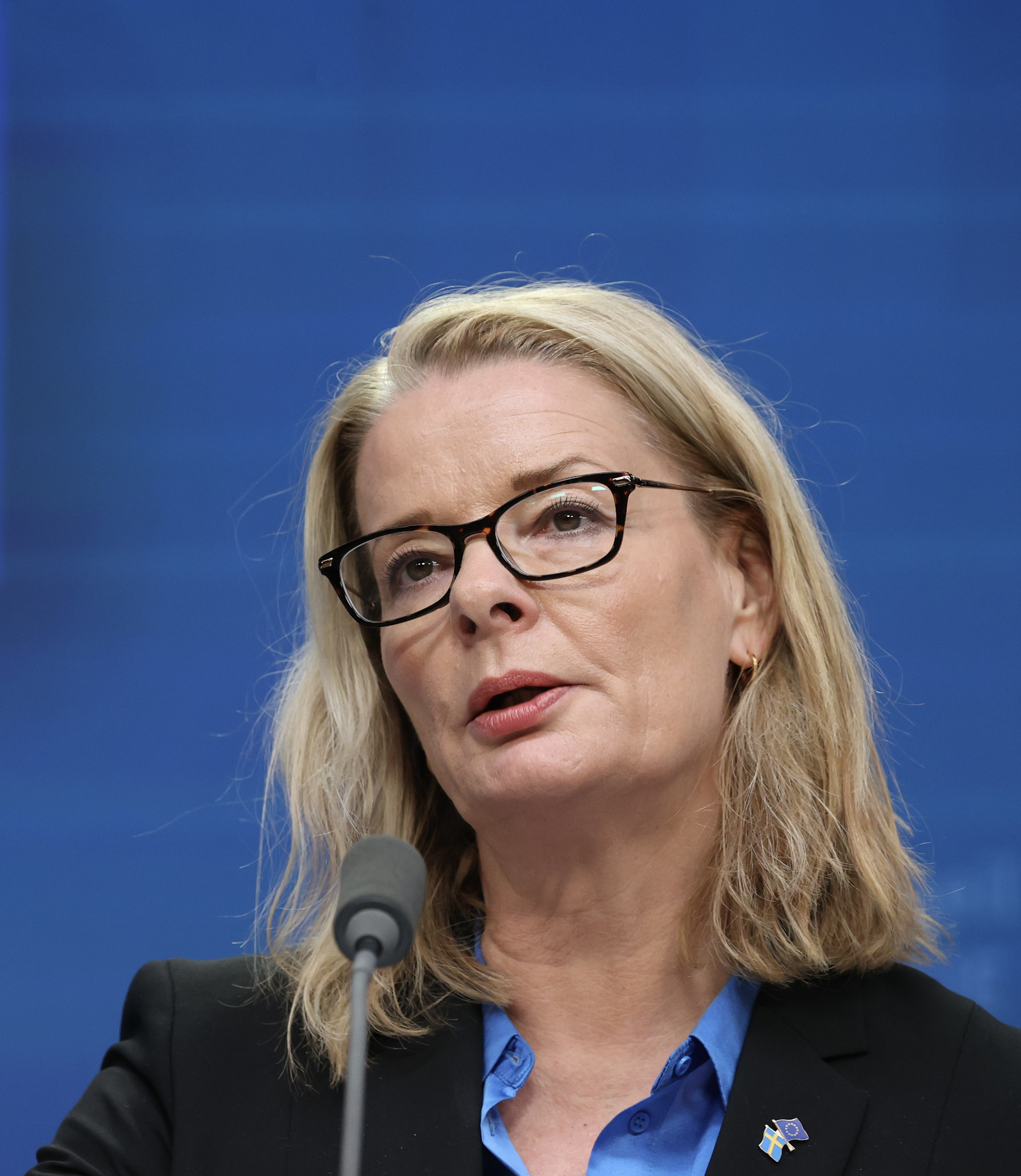
- Incumbent; Lotta Edholm since 18 October 2022
- Ministry of Education and Research
- Member of: The Government
- Reports to: Minister for Education
- Seat: Stockholm, Sweden
- Appointer: The Prime Minister
- Term length: No fixed term; Serves as long as the incumbent doesn’t have majority support in the Riksdag or support from the Prime Minister
- Formation: 4 January 1974
- First holder: Lena Hjelm-Wallén

The Minister for Schools (Swedish: Skolminister) is a cabinet minister in Sweden within the Ministry of Education and Research. The role includes overseeing preschools, primary schools, and upper secondary schools. Lotta Edholm currently serves as Sweden's minister for schools in the Kristersson cabinet.

From 2007, when Jan Björklund (L) was promoted to minister for education, until the formation of the Andersson cabinet in 2021, Sweden had no designated minister for schools. Instead, other titles were used for ministers within the Ministry of Education and Research, including deputy minister for education and minister for upper secondary school and adult education and training (gymnasie- och kunskapslyftsminister).

Unlike the minister for education, the minister for schools does not oversee higher education and research.

== List ==
| No. | Portrait | Name | Title | Took office | Left office | Time in office | Party | Cabinet | Cabinet |
|---|---|---|---|---|---|---|---|---|---|
| 1 | Lena Hjelm-Wallén | Lena Hjelm-Wallén (born 1943) | Minister for Schools | 4 January 1974 | 8 October 1976 | 2 years, 278 days | Social Democrats | – | Palme I cabinet |
| 2 | Britt Mogård | Britt Mogård (1922–2012) | Minister for Schools | 8 October 1976 | 18 October 1978 | 2 years, 10 days | Moderate | C–M–L | Fälldin I cabinet |
| 3 | Birgit Rodhe | Birgit Rodhe (1915–1998) | Minister for Schools | 18 October 1978 | 12 October 1979 | 359 days | Liberals | – | Ullsten cabinet |
| 4 | Britt Mogård | Britt Mogård (1922–2012) | Minister for Schools | 12 October 1979 | 5 May 1981 | 1 year, 205 days | Moderate | C–M–L | Fälldin II cabinet |
| 5 | Ulla Tillander | Ulla Tillander (1931–1994) | Minister for Schools; Minister for Youth | 22 May 1981 | 8 October 1982 | 1 year, 139 days | Centre | C–L | Fälldin III cabinet |
| 6 | Bengt Göransson | Bengt Göransson (1932–2021) | Minister for Culture; Minister for Schools | 8 October 1982 | 29 January 1989 | 6 years, 113 days | Social Democrats | – | Palme II cabinet Carlsson I cabinet |
| 7 | Göran Persson | Göran Persson (born 1949) | Minister for Schools | 30 January 1989 | 4 October 1991 | 2 years, 247 days | Social Democrats | – | Carlsson I cabinet Carlsson II cabinet |
| 8 | Beatrice Ask | Beatrice Ask (born 1956) | Minister for Schools | 4 October 1991 | 7 October 1994 | 3 years, 3 days | Moderate | M–L–C–KD | Carl Bildt cabinet |
| 9 | Ylva Johansson | Ylva Johansson (born 1964) | Minister for Schools | 7 October 1994 | 6 October 1998 | 3 years, 364 days | Social Democrats | – | Carlsson III cabinet |
| 10 | Ingegerd Wärnersson | Ingegerd Wärnersson (born 1947) | Minister for Schools | 7 October 1998 | 31 January 2002 | 3 years, 116 days | Social Democrats | – | Persson cabinet |
| 11 | Thomas Östros | Thomas Östros (born 1965) | Minister for Education; Minister for School | 1 February 2002 | 21 October 2004 | 2 years, 263 days | Social Democrats | – | Persson cabinet |
| 12 | Ibrahim Baylan | Ibrahim Baylan (born 1972) | Minister for Schools | 1 November 2004 | 6 October 2006 | 1 year, 339 days | Social Democrats | – | Persson cabinet |
| 13 | Jan Björklund | Jan Björklund (born 1962) | Minister for Schools | 6 October 2006 | 11 September 2007 | 340 days | Liberals | M–C–L–KD | Reinfeldt cabinet |
| 14 | Lina Axelsson Kihlblom | Lina Axelsson Kihlblom (born 1970) | Minister for Schools | 30 November 2021 | 18 October 2022 | 322 days | Social Democrats | – | Andersson cabinet |
| 15 | Lotta Edholm | Lotta Edholm (born 1967) | Minister for Schools | 18 October 2022 | Incumbent | 3 years, 346 days | Liberals | M–KD–L | Kristersson cabinet |
