= Lotta Edholm =

Swedish politician (born 1965)

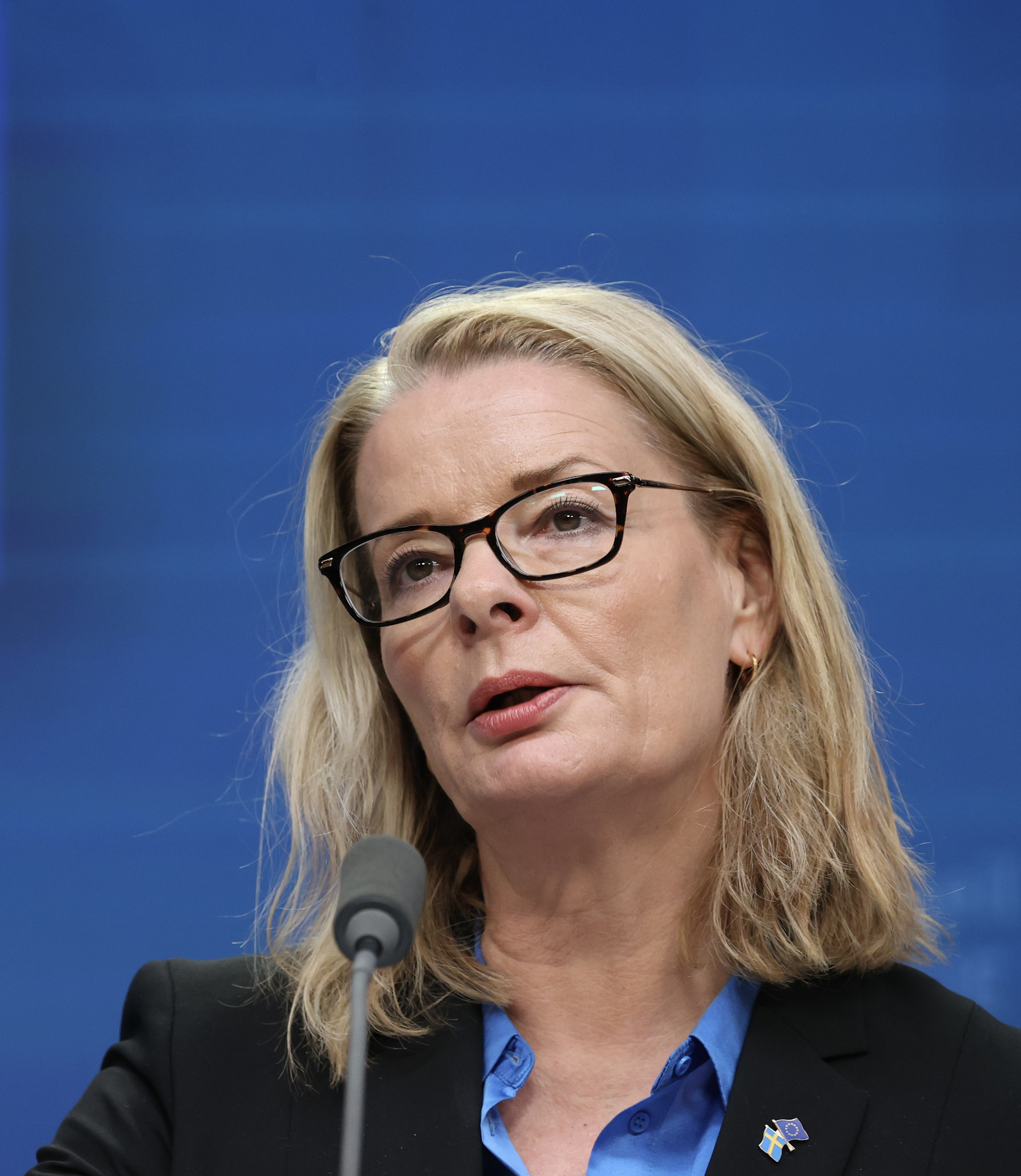
- Edholm in 2023

Minister for Upper Secondary School, Higher Education and Research
- Incumbent
- Assumed office 28 June 2025
- Prime Minister: Ulf Kristersson
- Preceded by: Anna Ekström

Minister for Schools
- In office 18 October 2022 – 28 June 2025
- Prime Minister: Ulf Kristersson
- Preceded by: Lina Axelsson Kihlblom
- Succeeded by: Ministry abolished

Member of the Riksdag
- Incumbent
- Assumed office 28 September 2026
- Constituency: Stockholm County
- In office 1 July 1992 – 1 October 1994
- Constituency: Stockholm County

School Commissioner of Stockholm
- In office 2018–2020
- In office 2006–2014

Leader of the Liberal Youth of Sweden
- In office 1989–1991
- Preceded by: Lars Granath
- Succeeded by: Fredrik Malmberg

Personal details
- Born: 8 February 1965 (age 61) Västerås, Sweden
- Party: Liberals
- Spouse: Lars Leijonborg (m. 1992; div. 2004)
- Children: 1
- Education: Stockholm University

Charlotta "Lotta" Kristina Johansdotter Edholm (born 8 February 1965) is a Swedish politician for the Liberals. She has been Minister for Upper Secondary School, Higher Education and Research since June 2025, having previously been Minister for Schools from 2022 to 2025, in the Ulf Kristersson cabinet.

== Early life, education and career ==
Edholm was born in Västerås, and has a BA in political sciences from Stockholm University. She served as a member of the Riksdag (statsrådersättare) from 1992 to 1994. She was municipal commissioner (borgarråd) for schools in Stockholm from 2006 to 2014, and 2018 to 2020 as well as in opposition from 2014 to 2018. She has been on the board of the freeschool group Tellusgruppen.

== Minister for Schools ==
On 18 October 2022 she was appointed the minister for schools in the Ulf Kristersson cabinet.

In 2023, she launched an investigation into state-supported friskolor (Free Schools), after calling into question its profit-making model. In recent years there had been a drop in educational standards with inequality rising. 15% of primary pupils (up to 16-year-old) and 30% of all upper school pupils went to friskolor. One major issue was the claim that some friskolor awarded pupils grades that were too high, distorting the grading system.

== Personal life ==
She was married to former Liberal party leader, Lars Leijonborg, with whom she has one son.
