= Bosse Ringholm =

Swedish politician (born 1942)

Bo Ringholm
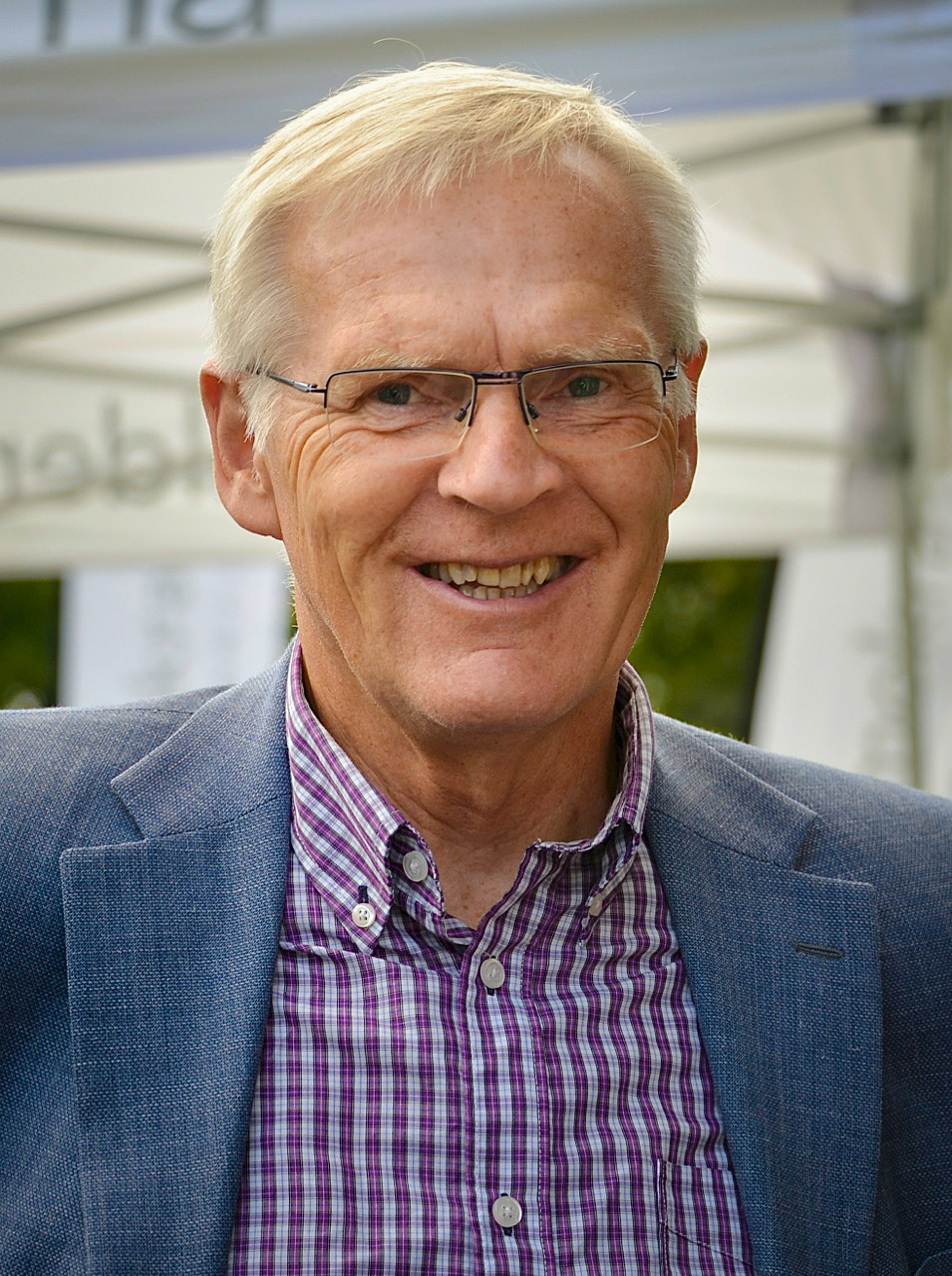
- Ringholm in 2014

Acting Minister for Foreign Affairs
- In office 21 March 2006 – 27 March 2006
- Prime Minister: Göran Persson
- Preceded by: Laila Freivalds
- Succeeded by: Jan Eliasson

Minister for European Affairs
- In office 1 January 2005 – 6 October 2006
- Prime Minister: Göran Persson
- Preceded by: Mats Hellström
- Succeeded by: Cecilia Malmström

Deputy Prime Minister of Sweden
- In office 1 November 2004 – 6 October 2006
- Prime Minister: Göran Persson
- Preceded by: Laila Freivalds
- Succeeded by: Maud Olofsson

Minister for Sport
- In office 1 November 2004 – 6 October 2006
- Prime Minister: Göran Persson
- Preceded by: Mona Sahlin
- Succeeded by: Cecilia Stegö Chilò

Minister for Finance
- In office 12 April 1999 – 31 October 2004
- Prime Minister: Göran Persson
- Preceded by: Erik Åsbrink
- Succeeded by: Pär Nuder

Personal details
- Born: Bo Ingvar Karchimirer Ringholm; 18 August 1942 (age 83) Falköping, Sweden
- Party: Social Democrats
- Spouse: Kerstin Ringholm
- Children: 3

Bo Ingvar Karchimirer "Bosse" Ringholm (born 18 August 1942) is a Swedish Social Democratic politician. He held the titles of Minister of Finance, Deputy Prime Minister, Minister for Policy Coordination, and Minister for Sport in the Persson administration.

== Career ==
Ringholm was born in Falköping, a town in the west of Sweden, and grew up in a working-class family. He lacks higher education, and dropped out of high school after failing both Maths and English. Like many Swedish Social Democratic politicians of his generation, Ringholm started his political career in the Swedish Social Democratic Youth League (SSU), an organisation he led 1967–1972. As chairman of the Social Democratic Youth League, Ringholm was known for his radical left-wing views. Among other things, he advocated the nationalization of private-owned Swedish bank institutions and Swedish economic support to the National Front for the Liberation of South Vietnam (FNL), the government of North Vietnam, the Pathet Lao in Laos and the Khmer Rouge in Cambodia.

After stepping down from chairman of SSU, Ringholm worked as a political adviser at the Ministries of the Interior and Labour. He also became active in the local politics of Stockholm. From 1973 he was a member of the Stockholm County Council, and two years later he was elected to the executive committee of the Stockholm party branch. In 1976 he became a director at the Ministry of Education and Science, and worked in the government administration until he became Transportation Commissioner of the Stockholm County from 1983. From 1997 he was the director-general of the Swedish Labour Market Board (AMS), until Prime Minister Göran Persson unexpectedly named him to succeed Erik Åsbrink as Minister for Finance in 1999.

On 21 October 2004 Göran Persson announced a restructuring of his government, in which Ringholm was moved from the Ministry of Finance to become Deputy Prime Minister, Minister for Policy Coordination and Minister for Sport. The reason cited by Persson was Ringholm was not interested in continuing as Minister of Finance following the coming 2006 general elections. His successor was Pär Nuder.

Following the resignation of Laila Freivalds on 21 March 2006, Ringholm was temporarily acting as Minister for Foreign Affairs until 27 March, when he was replaced by Carin Jämtin who also held the post temporarily until the new Minister for Foreign Affairs, Jan Eliasson, took office on 24 April.

== Private ==
Although Ringholm's given name is Bo, he is almost always referred to as "Bosse", the common Swedish nickname for Bo – even in formal circumstances. He is a teetotaller. He is also known for his great interest in sports and was the chair of the sports club Enskede IK for 15 years until he declared he was going to step down when he became Minister for Sport. His involvement in the club has been far from unproblematic. In the summer of 2004, it was discovered that the club had neglected to pay taxes related to the sale of ad space. Ringholm denied any knowledge of this but promised that the taxes were going to be paid. A few months later the Swedish national public radio aired a news story claiming that Enskede IK had made payments to coaches without reporting them to tax authorities, prompting the Swedish National Tax Board to investigate the matter. Ringholm, however, denied the allegations.

Party political offices
Preceded by Ingvar Carlsson	Chair of the Social Democratic Youth League; 1967–1972	Succeeded by Lars Engqvist
Political offices
Preceded by Leni Björklund	Finance Commissioner of the Stockholm County Council; 1989–1991	Succeeded by Ralph Lédel
Preceded by Elwe Nilsson	Chief Commissioner of the Stockholm County Council; 1994–1997	Succeeded by Claes Ånstrand
Preceded by Erik Åsbrink	Minister for Finance; 1999–2004	Succeeded by Pär Nuder
Preceded by Laila Freivalds	Deputy Prime Minister of Sweden; 2004–2006	Succeeded by Maud Olofsson
Preceded by Mona Sahlin	Minister for Sports; 2004–2006	Succeeded by Cecilia Stegö Chilò
Preceded by Mats Hellström	Minister for European Affairs; 2005–2006	Succeeded by Cecilia Malmström
Preceded by Laila Freivalds	Minister for Foreign Affairs; Acting; 2006	Succeeded by Jan Eliasson
Government offices
Preceded by Göte Bernhardsson	Director-General of the Swedish Employment Services; 1997–1999	Succeeded by Anders Johansson
