= Britt Mogård =

Swedish politician (1922–2012)

Minister of Schools
- In office 8 October 1976 – 12 October 1978
- Preceded by: Lena Hjelm-Wallén
- Succeeded by: Birgit Rodhe

Minister of Schools
- In office 12 October 1979 – 5 May 1981
- Prime Minister: Thorbjörn Fälldin
- Preceded by: Birgit Rodhe
- Succeeded by: Ulla Tillander

Governor of Kronoberg County
- In office 1983–1988

Personal details
- Born: 9 November 1922 Hedesunda, Gävleborg County, Sweden
- Died: 17 July 2012 (aged 89) Ösmo, Stockholm County, Sweden
- Party: Moderate Party
- Spouse: Einar Mogård (m. 1946–1971)

Britt Mogård (née Östlund; 9 November 1922 – 12 July 2012) was a Swedish politician. She served as a member of the Riksdag from 1969 to 1983, representing Stockholm County for the Moderate Party.

She was the Chair of the Moderate Women in 1972–1981. From 1983 to 1988, Mogård was Governor of Kronoberg County. She was also minister of schools from 1976 to 1978, and again from 1979 to 1981.
