= Pär Nuder =

Swedish politician (born 1963)

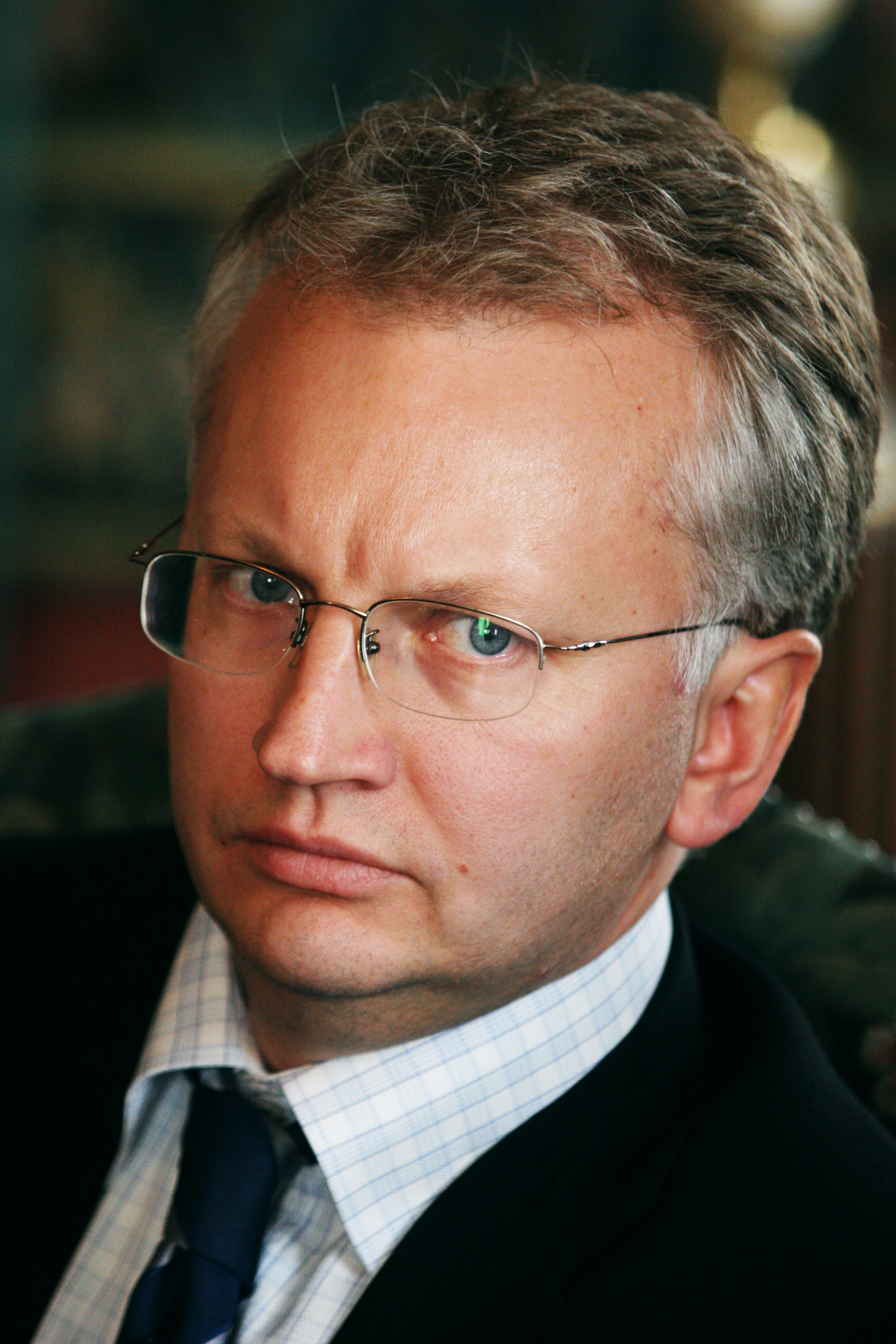
- Pär Nuder during the Nordic Council's session in Stockholm in November 2004

Minister for Finance
- In office 21 October 2004 – 6 October 2006
- Prime Minister: Göran Persson
- Preceded by: Bosse Ringholm
- Succeeded by: Anders Borg

Minister for Coordination
- In office 21 oktober 2002 – 21 October 2004
- Prime Minister: Göran Persson

Personal details
- Born: Pär Anders Nuder; 27 February 1963 (age 63) Täby, Sweden
- Party: Social Democrats
- Spouse: Ingrid Carlberg
- Children: 2
- Education: Stockholm University

Pär Anders Nuder (born 27 February 1963) is a Swedish Social Democratic former politician. He was member of Parliament 1994 to 2009, minister for finance from 2004 to 2006, minister for policy co-ordination and state secretary and chief of staff to the prime minister, Göran Persson, 1997–2002.

Today, Pär Nuder is a businessman with several assignments in the private sector as an advisor and as a board member. He is also active in various non-profit organisation. Since 2018 he is chairman of the Swedish Estonian Cooperation Fund, an independent foundation that promotes cooperation between the two countries. Nuder was the chairman of the Third Swedish National Pension Fund (AP3), one of Sweden's leading pension companies AMF and Hemsö, and on the board of several Nordic companies. He is a senior counselor at Albright Stonebridge Group and an industrial advisor to the private-equity firm EQT AB.

== Biography ==
Pär Nuder grew up in Österåker, where he still resides. His father, Ants Nuder, was one of the numerous Estonian refugees who fled to Sweden to escape the Soviet invasion at the end of World War II. During his childhood, Nuder spent several summers in Israel, which has resulted in a strong personal commitment to the Middle East peace process. Educated at Stockholm University, he has a Bachelor of Laws degree.

== Career ==
=== Politics ===
His political path began in the local Swedish Social Democratic Youth League club. From 1986 to 1989, he was the chairman of the Stockholm County branch of the organisation and from 1987 to 1990 he was a member of the national board. At the same time he was a member of the Österåker municipal executive committee, from 1982 to 1994. In 1986, he started his career as a political adviser, first to the minister for justice (before being forced to resign in October 1987 as a result of the political fallout of the Soviet spy Stig Bergling's escape from custody) and later to the prime minister, first to Ingvar Carlsson, and to his successor, Göran Persson. For a few years he also worked as a political secretary to the Social Democratic parliamentary party group. In 1994, he was elected a member of parliament.

In 1997, he was offered the position of state secretary in the prime minister's office. Although he was more or less unknown to the general public at the time, he was generally believed to be Persson's close ally and one of his personal favourites to succeed him as party leader and prime minister. This impression was strengthened by Persson's move to let Nuder join his cabinet as minister for policy co-ordination in 2002, an influential behind-the-scenes post. When Marita Ulvskog stepped down as minister for culture in September 2004, he took over the portfolio, although it was explicitly stated that this was not a long-term solution. The prime minister's intentions instead became public on 21 October 2004, when Persson announced a restructuring of his government in which Nuder was to take over as minister of finance after Bosse Ringholm.

Responding to media questions on whether his plan was to be the next prime minister, he simply answered that he did not "think about it" and was concentrating on his tasks as minister of finance. He also restated the government's goal to reduce the rate of open unemployment below four percent again.

During a speech in December 2004, he introduced the controversial term köttberg (mountain of meat) to describe the baby boomer generation (born in the 1940s). This speech addressed the potential pension bomb Sweden is facing.

During early 2008, he lost his position as Social Democratic candidate for finance minister due to quarrels with party leader Mona Sahlin. Nuder himself said, "If [Mona Sahlin] believes there is another person better suited to speak for the economic policy of Social Democracy in Sweden, then I won't hesitate to step aside for that person." He was succeeded as economic advisor for the Social Democratic party and its candidate for finance minister for the election in 2010 by Thomas Östros, earlier minister of education.

=== Private sector ===
After holding central political positions for more than two decades, Nuder left politics in 2009. Since then, he has held various positions on different boards. Notably, Nuder has been the chairman of The Third National Pension Fund (AP3), AMF Pension, and Hemsö AB. Nuder has also been an advisor to the private equity firm EQT and member of the President's Advisory Council, Tokyo University.

Currently Nuder is a senior counselor of the strategy firm Albright Stonebridge Group, advising clients on financial trends and providing strategic advice to clients seeking to enter the European market. He is also chairman of the board of Aimo Holding AB, and of the non-profit foundation Sweden-Estonia Cooperation Fund.

Nuder was a columnist at the business newspaper Dagens industri for seven years and has written an autobiography called Stolt men inte nöjd: en kärleksförklaring till politiken.

Pär Nuder has been awarded H.M. The King's Medal 12th size with the ribbon of the Order of the Seraphim and The Order of the Cross of Terra Mariana, 3rd Class, Estonia.

Political offices
Preceded by Bosse Ringholm	Minister for Finance; 2004–2006	Succeeded by Anders Borg
