= Laila Freivalds =

Swedish Social Democratic politician

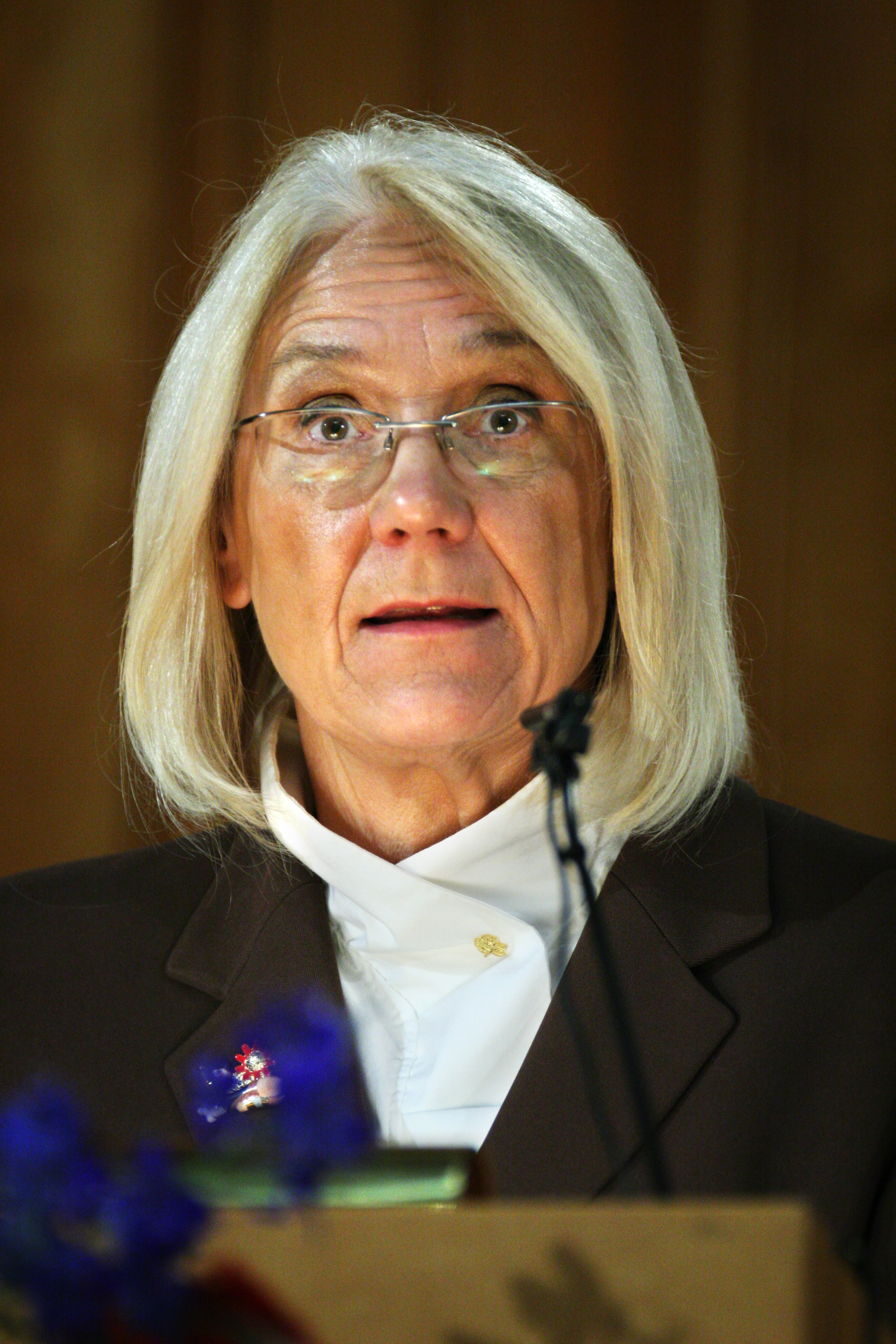
- Laila Freivalds in November 2004

Acting Deputy Prime Minister of Sweden
- In office 1 October 2004 – 1 November 2004
- Prime Minister: Göran Persson
- Preceded by: Jan O. Karlsson
- Succeeded by: Bo Ringholm

Minister for Foreign Affairs
- In office 10 October 2003 – 21 March 2006
- Prime Minister: Göran Persson
- Preceded by: Jan O. Karlsson (Acting)
- Succeeded by: Bo Ringholm (Acting)

Minister for Justice
- In office 7 October 1994 – 21 September 2000
- Prime Minister: Ingvar Carlsson; Göran Persson
- Preceded by: Gun Hellsvik
- Succeeded by: Lena Hjelm-Wallén
- In office 4 October 1988 – 4 October 1991
- Prime Minister: Ingvar Carlsson
- Preceded by: Thage G. Peterson
- Succeeded by: Gun Hellsvik

Personal details
- Born: 22 June 1942 (age 84) Riga, Reichskommissariat Ostland (now Latvia)
- Party: Social Democratic
- Education: Uppsala University

Laila Freivalds (born 22 June 1942) is a Swedish Social Democratic politician who served as Minister for Justice from 1988 to 1991 and again from 1994 to 2000, as Minister for Foreign Affairs from 2003 to 2006 and as Deputy Prime Minister of Sweden briefly in 2004.

Freivalds was born in Riga, Latvia, during World War II, and escaped to Sweden with her family. She graduated with a Candidate of Law (juris kandidat) from Uppsala University in 1970, after which she served in the Swedish Court System until 1976. From 1976 onwards she held senior posts at the Swedish Consumer Agency, before being appointed Minister for Justice in 1988. With the exception of the years 1991–1994, when her party was in opposition, she continued to hold that office until she resigned in 2000 over a controversy in which she was criticised, as a private individual, for trying to convert her tenancy into a condominium, circumventing a controversial housing tenure law that she was responsible for introducing and advocating in her public role as Minister of Justice. Since this scandal, her relations with the press have been strained.

Following the assassination of Swedish Foreign Minister Anna Lindh on 11 September 2003, Freivalds was asked to succeed her as Minister for Foreign Affairs.

== Events leading to the resignation in 2006 ==
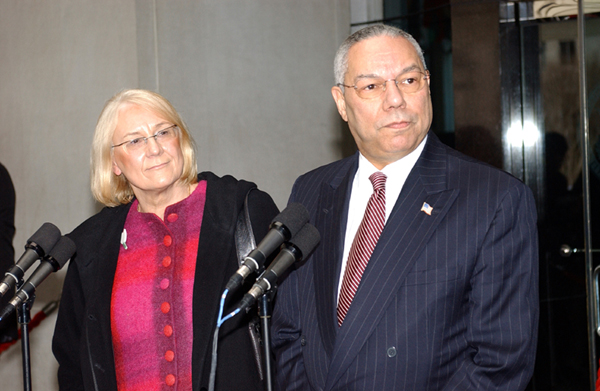
Laila Freivalds with US Secretary of State Colin Powell in February 2004.

Laila Freivalds was severely criticised in the Swedish press for the way the Swedish Government handled the 2004 Indian Ocean earthquake and tsunami in Asia, and has admitted that her ministry "Ought to have reacted much more strongly as early as Boxing Day instead of waiting for more information." In addition, she was heavily criticised for going to the theatre on 26 December 2004, the day of the tsunami disaster, and for stating that she does not listen to the news when she is not working.

On 21 March 2006, she resigned from her office as minister of foreign affairs, after it was confirmed that she lied to media about her involvement in the closing of a website belonging to the Sweden Democrats, in the wake of the Jyllands-Posten Muhammad cartoons controversy. During the controversy the Sweden Democrats published a similar cartoon on their web pages, only to be shut down shortly after by their internet service provider. It was initially discovered that the government had been in contact with the provider and suggested to them the closure, but Freivalds maintained to the media that a subordinate had done so without her knowledge.

Offentlighetsprincipen (The Principle of Public Access) – a freedom of information provision enshrined in the Swedish constitution – made it possible to show that this was false. Since all documents in the Swedish state are in principle accessible to the public, internal documents in four places were found that made it clear that she had been fully informed of the event. This information was therefore published in "Riksdag & Department", an intra-governmental newspaper. The potential involvement in closing the website was seen by many as a violation against that part of the Swedish constitution dealing with freedom of the press.

Most journalists suggest that the turning point came after Göran Persson, the Prime Minister of Sweden during this time, publicly criticized the civil servant who suggested to the Internet host that they close the website, only to find out later that he had acted with the approval of Freivalds. It is theorised but not confirmed that the prime minister privately suggested that she resign, which she subsequently did.

Bo Ringholm was Acting Minister of Foreign Affairs until 27 March, when Jan Eliasson was appointed to the post.

Political offices
Preceded by Thage G. Peterson	Minister for Justice; 1988–1991	Succeeded by Gun Hellsvik
Preceded by Gun Hellsvik	Minister for Justice; 1994–2000	Succeeded by Thomas Bodström
Preceded by Jan O. Karlsson; Acting	Minister for Foreign Affairs; 2003–2006	Succeeded by Bo Ringholm
Preceded by Jan O. Karlsson	Deputy Prime Minister of Sweden; Acting; 2004	Succeeded by Bo Ringholm
