= Thomas Bodström =

Swedish politician (born 1962)

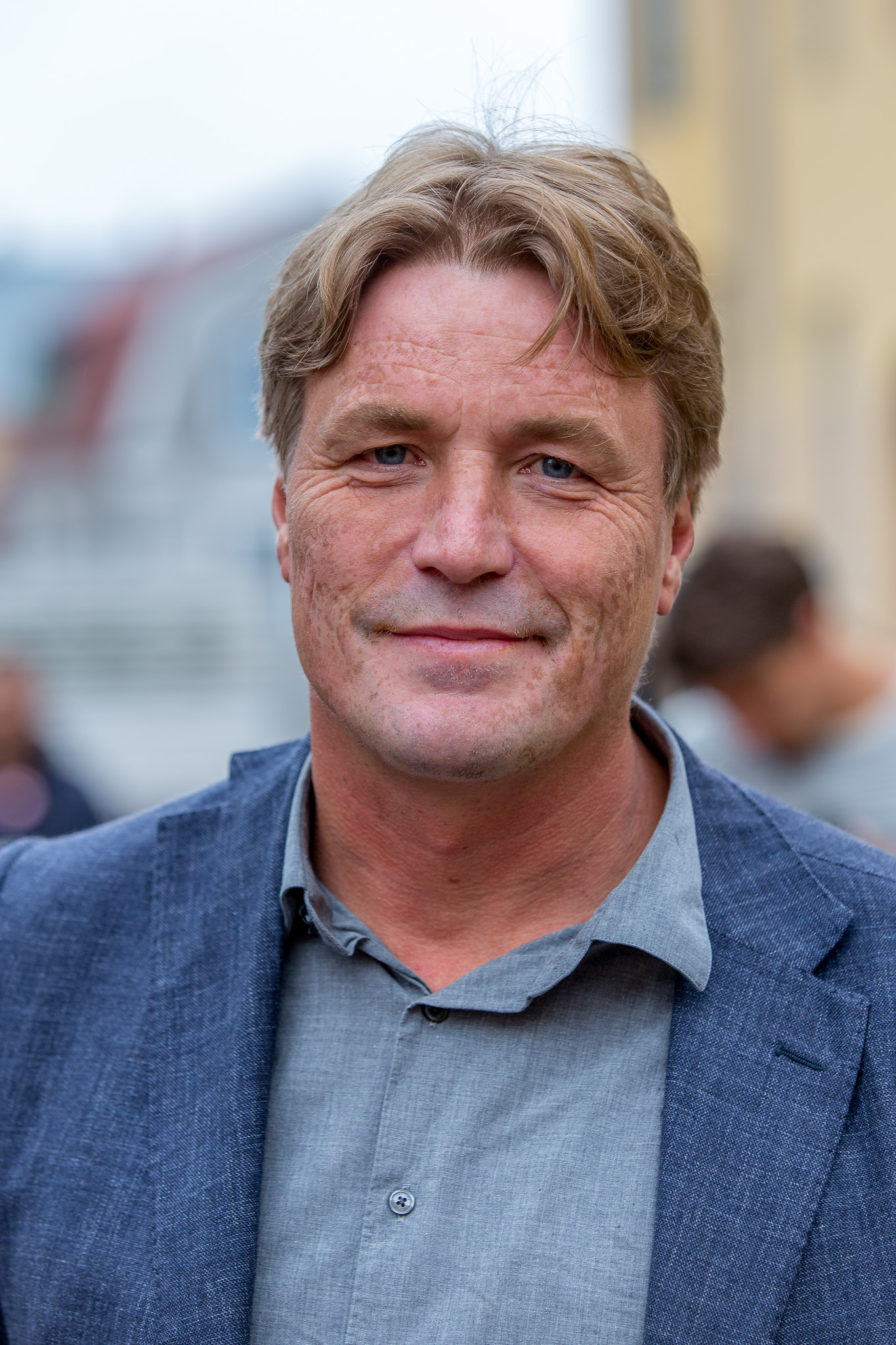
- Bodström in 2014

Minister for Justice
- In office 11 October 2000 – 6 October 2006
- Prime Minister: Göran Persson
- Preceded by: Laila Freivalds
- Succeeded by: Beatrice Ask

Personal details
- Born: Thomas Lennart Bodström; 9 April 1962 (age 64) Uppsala, Sweden
- Party: Social Democratic
- Parent: Lennart Bodström (father)
- Education: Stockholm University
Association football career
- Height: 1.87 m (6 ft 2 in)
- Position: Defender
Senior career*
Years	Team	Apps	(Gls)
1982–1985	Spånga IS		
1986	Enköpings SK FK		
1987–1989	AIK	48	(3)
- * Club domestic league appearances and goals

Thomas Lennart Bodström (born 9 April 1962) is a Swedish former politician of the Swedish Social Democratic Party. He served as the Swedish Minister for Justice in the two governments of Prime Minister Göran Persson, from 2000 to 2006. Prior to politics he had a career in association football, representing Allsvenskan side AIK between 1987 and 1989.

== Football career ==
Bodström played professional football in the 1980s as a defender and represented Allsvenskan club AIK between 1987 and 1989, making a total of 48 league appearances and scoring three goals for the club. Prior to representing AIK, he also played for Spånga IS and Enköpings SK FK.

== Political career ==
In 1990, Bodström graduated from Stockholm University with a Degree of Master of Laws, LL.M. After that, he worked as a lawyer for ten years. During his career, he took interest in international affairs, and in 1999, he joined the board of the Swedish branch of the international organisation Lawyers Without Borders.

However, when Prime Minister Göran Persson announced his new cabinet appointment on 11 October 2000, Bodström was a completely unknown face to most of the political journalists attending the press conference. At the time, he was not even a member of the Social Democratic Party. Although Bodström was a newcomer to national politics, he remained in his post until 2006 in two Persson cabinets, surviving calls for his resignation after several high-profile prison breaks during summer 2004. During his term in office, Bodström was heavily criticized by advocates of privacy and liberal think tanks, for acting to give the police the opportunity to monitor those who might be involved in minor crimes, as well as other things they argued were intrusive to privacy. He has written a book, 700 dagar i Rosenbad (700 days in Rosenbad), about his experiences as a newcomer in the government.

From October 2006 until October 2010, he was the chairman of the Riksdag committee for judicial issues. When the new parliament was elected in 2010, Bodström lost his position as a committee chairman. Shortly after that, he requested half-time leave of absence from his seat in parliament, combined with half-time parental leave, in order to relocate to the United States with his family. His part-time parental leave was already granted from the Swedish Social Insurance Administration, but his request for leave of absence was denied by the Social Democratic group leader in the parliament, and Bodström thus resigned his seat in the Parliament.

Since mid-2011, Bodström has been an expert commentator on law on the crime reality TV show Efterlyst on TV3.

== Controversy ==
At the time of his appointment, Bodström revealed in an interview that he had used hashish in his youth, and also, that he on several occasions had employed a person in his home without paying the appropriate taxes.

On 23 August 2010, during an interview by Swedish Radio, in light of the current drug testing debate, the reporter asked Bodström if he was willing to participate in a drug test. Bodström at first agreed, but when the nurse explained that he would be tested for amphetamines, hashish, opiates, and benzodiazepines, he changed his mind, and said, "I don't feel like doing it now. I am sweating too much." The Pirate Party defended his right not to take the test in reference to their views on privacy.

== Personal life and family ==
Thomas Bodström is the son of Lennart Bodström, who was Swedish Minister for Foreign Affairs from 1982 to 1985 in the Olof Palme government.

== Football career statistics ==
Appearances and goals by club, season and competition
Club	Season	Division	League		Svenska Cupen		Europe		Total	
Club	Season	Division	Apps	Goals	Apps	Goals	Apps	Goals	Apps	Goals
AIK	1987	Allsvenskan	15	1			2	0	17	1
AIK	1988	Allsvenskan	15	0			—		15	0
AIK	1989	Allsvenskan	18	2			—		18	2
Career total			48	3	3		2	0	53	3

== Bibliography ==
- (2004) 700 dagar i Rosenbad Biography, Albert Bonniers Förlag, ISBN 91-85015-15-6.
- (2008) Rymmaren crime fiction, Norstedts Förlag
- (2009) Idealisten crime fiction, Norstedts Förlag
- (2010) Lobbyisten crime fiction, Norstedts Förlag
- (2013) Populisten
- (2014) Det man minns

Political offices
Preceded by Laila Freivalds	Minister for Justice; 2000–2006	Succeeded by Beatrice Ask
