= Deputy Prime Minister of Sweden =

Deputy head of government of Sweden

- Ställföreträdande statsminister
- Coat of arms of Sweden

- Flag of Sweden

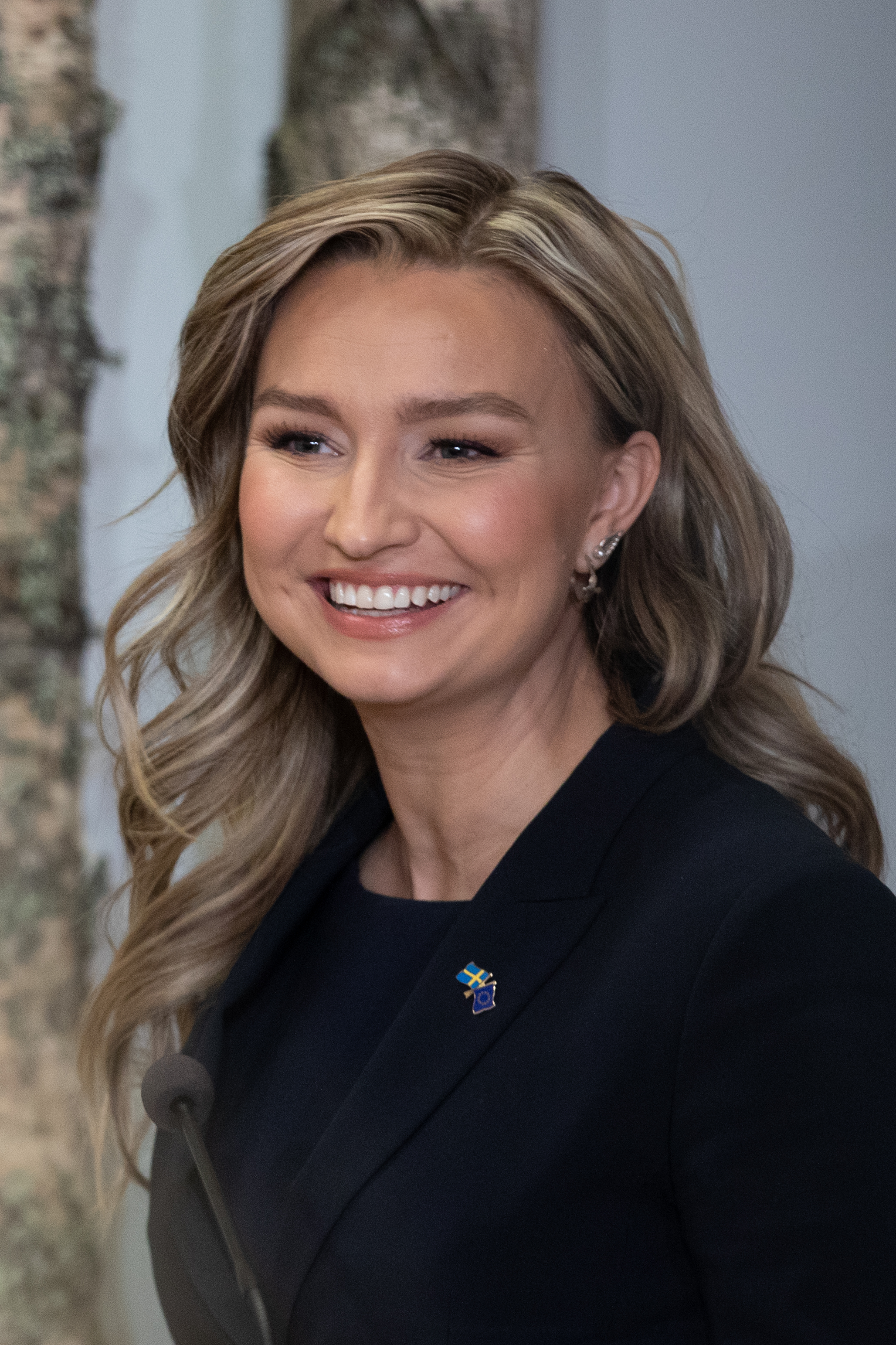
- Incumbent; Ebba Busch since 18 October 2022
- Appointer: Prime Minister
- Term length: No fixed term
- Inaugural holder: Gunnar Sträng
- Formation: 1 January 1975; 51 years ago
- Website: Government of Sweden

The deputy prime minister of Sweden (Swedish: Ställföreträdande statsminister) is the deputy head of government of Sweden. The incumbent deputy prime minister is Ebba Busch.

The Swedish constitution allows the prime minister to appoint one of the ministers in the cabinet as deputy prime minister (Swedish: ställföreträdande statsminister, sometimes unofficially known as vice statsminister), in case the prime minister for some reason is prevented from performing their duties. If a deputy prime minister has not been appointed, the minister in the cabinet who has served the longest time (and if there are several with equal experience the one who is oldest) takes over as head of government (these are marked in italic in the table below).

A deputy prime minister can only serve as prime minister in a temporary function, as the resignation of a prime minister automatically includes the entire Cabinet, and the Instrument of Government requires the speaker of the Riksdag to dismiss the Cabinet in the case of the death of the prime minister.

== History ==
=== Origins of the office ===
Historically, under the 1809 Instrument of Government, the minister for foreign affairs (the "second excellency" and at the time the only formal "minister" save for the prime minister, the other cabinet members' formal title being Councillor of State for... etc) was to function as acting prime minister should the prime minister not be able not to perform his duties. With the enactment of the 1974 Instrument of Government and the inauguration of Thorbjörn Fälldin's three-party cabinet in 1976, Per Ahlmark was formally sworn in as the first to hold the office of deputy prime minister.

=== Palme assassination ===
In 1986 Deputy Prime Minister Ingvar Carlsson became acting Prime Minister for the transitional cabinet from March 1 to March 12, upon the assassination of Olof Palme, the only time the death of the Prime Minister has caused the Deputy Prime Minister to temporarily assume the office. Carlsson subsequently received the task of forming a new cabinet from the Speaker of the Riksdag. The cabinet was approved by the Riksdag on March 12, 1986, effectively reappointing most cabinet members in their previous offices.

=== Role in coalition governments ===
The role and position of a deputy prime minister may vary. In the five last coalition cabinets, Fälldin III, Bildt and Reinfeldt I and II, and Löfven, the deputy prime minister was the head of the second-largest coalition partner (Liberals in Fälldin III, Bildt and Reinfeldt II, Centre in Reinfeldt I, Green in Löfven). In the governments Fälldin I and II, however, the deputy prime ministership belonged to the Liberal Party despite the fact that it was the smallest of the three members. The reason for this might be ascribed to an unwillingness on behalf of the Centre and Liberals to give this position to the Moderates, due to ideological differences. In all of these governments, however, the deputy prime minister also had a regular Cabinet portfolio.

In July 2015, the office of the deputy prime minister was the subject of some political debate. Following a brief illness of the Social Democratic prime minister, Stefan Löfven, the Prime Minister's office revealed that the deputy prime minister Åsa Romson of the Green Party, although named Vice statsminister ("Vice Prime Minister") when the cabinet took office in October 2014, was in fact not expected to temporarily assume the duties of the prime minister as Statsministerns ställföreträdare ("Deputy of the Prime Minister") as stated in the instrument of government, instead yielding to the most senior minister of the cabinet. Effectively this made the Social Democratic then-foreign minister Margot Wallström the actual deputy of the prime minister, due to seniority rather than appointment. It also rendered the title of Vice statsminister an honorary title, for the most senior member of the party functioning as junior partner in the governing coalition, rather than an actual function.

=== Role in one-party governments ===
The situation is different in the one-party governments that have existed since the position of deputy prime minister was introduced in 1976, namely the Liberal Ullsten government and the Social Democratic governments Palme II, Carlsson I-III and Persson. While Mona Sahlin might well have been described as something of a "successor-in-waiting" (even if she ultimately did not succeed Ingvar Carlsson to the premiership), the other deputy prime ministers have tended to be older and experienced politicians who have often been in charge of coordinating the work of the Government and may also have been in charge of some policy areas of their own which were not substantial enough to warrant a full-time Cabinet position, such as Bo Ringholm, who was minister of sport concurrently with being deputy prime minister.

== Legal status ==
According to 10 § Chapter 6 of the Instrument of Government, the Prime Minister may appoint a deputy who assumes the duties of the Prime Minister in case the latter is for some reason prevented from performing their duties. If such a deputy has not been appointed or if the appointed deputy is prevented from performing their duties, the minister who has served for the longest period of time assumes the office. If two or more ministers have served for an equal amount of time, seniority decides.

== List of officeholders ==
Color key

Independent Social Democrats Moderate Centre Left Liberals Christian Democrats Green Sweden Democrats

| № | Deputy Prime Minister | | Position | Took office | Left office | Duration | Party | Prime Minister |
|---|---|---|---|---|---|---|---|---|
| – | Gunnar Sträng | Gunnar Sträng (1906–1992); Acting | Minister for Finance | 1 January 1975 | 8 October 1976 | 1 year, 281 days | Social Democrats | Olof Palme (S) |
| 1 | Per Ahlmark | Per Ahlmark (1939–2018) | Minister for Employment | 8 October 1976 | 7 March 1978 | 1 year, 150 days | Liberals | Thorbjörn Fälldin (C) |
| 2 | Ola Ullsten | Ola Ullsten (1931–2018) | Minister for Employment, Minister for International; Development Cooperation | 7 March 1978 | 18 October 1978 | 225 days | Liberals | Thorbjörn Fälldin (C) |
| – | Sven Romanus | Sven Romanus (1906–2005); Acting | Minister for Justice | 18 October 1978 | 12 October 1979 | 359 days | Independent | Ola Ullsten (L) |
| – | Ingemar Mundebo | Ingemar Mundebo (1930–2018); Acting | Minister for Justice | 12 October 1979 | 1 August 1980 | 294 days | Liberals | Thorbjörn Fälldin (C) |
| (2) | Ola Ullsten | Ola Ullsten (1931–2018) | Minister for Foreign Affairs | 1 August 1980 | 8 October 1982 | 2 years, 68 days | Liberals | Thorbjörn Fälldin (C) |
| 3 | Ingvar Carlsson | Ingvar Carlsson (born 1934) | Minister for the Environment | 8 October 1982 | 28 February 1986 | 3 years, 143 days | Social Democrats | Olof Palme (S) |
| – | Svante Lundkvist | Svante Lundkvist (1919–1991); Acting | Minister for Agriculture | 28 February 1986 | 9 October 1986 | 223 days | Social Democrats | Ingvar Carlsson (S) |
| – | Kjell-Olof Feldt | Kjell-Olof Feldt (1931–2025); Acting | Minister for Finance | 9 October 1986 | 16 February 1990 | 3 years, 130 days | Social Democrats | Ingvar Carlsson (S) |
| – | Lena Hjelm-Wallén | Lena Hjelm-Wallén (born 1943); Acting | Minister for International; Development Cooperation | 16 February 1990 | 27 February 1990 | 11 days | Social Democrats | Ingvar Carlsson (S) |
| 4 | Odd Engström | Odd Engström (1941–1998) | – | 27 February 1990 | 4 October 1991 | 1 year, 219 days | Social Democrats | Ingvar Carlsson (S) |
| 5 | Bengt Westerberg | Bengt Westerberg (born 1943) | Minister for Health and Social Affairs | 4 October 1991 | 7 October 1994 | 3 years, 3 days | Liberals | Carl Bildt (M) |
| 6 | Mona Sahlin | Mona Sahlin (born 1957) | Minister for Gender Equality | 7 October 1994 | 16 November 1995 | 1 year, 40 days | Social Democrats | Ingvar Carlsson (S) |
| 7 | Lena Hjelm-Wallén | Lena Hjelm-Wallén (born 1943) | Minister for Foreign Affairs (1994–1998) | 16 November 1995 | 21 October 2002 | 6 years, 339 days | Social Democrats | Ingvar Carlsson (S) (1995 – 1996); Göran Persson (S) (1996 – 2002) |
| 8 | Margareta Winberg | Margareta Winberg (born 1943) | Minister for Gender Equality | 21 October 2002 | 31 October 2003 | 1 year, 10 days | Social Democrats | Göran Persson (S) |
| – | Marita Ulvskog | Marita Ulvskog (born 1951); Acting | Minister for Culture and Sports | 31 October 2003 | 1 June 2004 | 214 days | Social Democrats | Göran Persson (S) |
| 9 | Lars Engqvist | Lars Engqvist (born 1945) | Minister for Health and Social Affairs | 1 June 2004 | 1 October 2004 | 122 days | Social Democrats | Göran Persson (S) |
| – | Laila Freivalds | Laila Freivalds (born 1942); Acting | Minister for Foreign Affairs | 1 October 2004 | 1 November 2004 | 31 days | Social Democrats | Göran Persson (S) |
| 10 | Bo Ringholm | Bo Ringholm (born 1942) | Minister for European Union Affairs | 1 November 2004 | 6 October 2006 | 1 year, 339 days | Social Democrats | Göran Persson (S) |
| 11 | Maud Olofsson | Maud Olofsson (born 1955) | Minister for Enterprise and Energy | 6 October 2006 | 5 October 2010 | 3 years, 364 days | Centre | Fredrik Reinfeldt (M) |
| 12 | Jan Björklund | Jan Björklund (born 1962) | Minister for Education | 5 October 2010 | 3 October 2014 | 3 years, 363 days | Liberals | Fredrik Reinfeldt (M) |
| – | Margot Wallström | Margot Wallström (born 1954); Acting | Minister for Foreign Affairs | 3 October 2014 | 10 September 2019 | 4 years, 342 days | Social Democrats | Stefan Löfven (S) |
| – | Morgan Johansson | Morgan Johansson (born 1970); Acting | Minister for Justice (2014–2022); Minister for Migration (2019–2021); Minister of the Interior (2021–2022) | 10 September 2019 | 18 October 2022 | 3 years, 38 days | Social Democrats | Stefan Löfven (S) (2019 – 2021); Magdalena Andersson (S) (2021 – 2022) |
| 13 | Ebba Busch | Ebba Busch (born 1987) | Minister for Energy, Business, Industry and Innovation | 18 October 2022 | Incumbent | 3 years, 340 days | Christian Democrats | Ulf Kristersson (M) |

== List of people with the honorary title of "deputy prime minister" ==
When Stefan Löfven became Prime Minister of Sweden he appointed a cabinet minister with the honorary title of "deputy prime minister", despite not being the designated stand-in should he not be able to carry out his duties as prime minister. The honorary title was awarded to one of the two spokespersons of the Green Party, the junior coalition partner of his cabinet. With Magdalena Anderssons appointment as prime minister and the withdrawal of the Green Party from the government, this system ceased.

| № | Deputy Prime Minister | | Position | Took office | Left office | Duration | Party | Prime Minister |
|---|---|---|---|---|---|---|---|---|
| | Åsa Romson | Åsa Romson (born 1972) | Minister for the Environment | 3 October 2014 | 25 May 2016 | 1 year, 235 days | Green | Stefan Löfven (S) |
| | Isabella Lövin | Isabella Lövin (born 1963) | Minister for International Development Cooperation (2014–2019); Minister for the Climate (2016–2021); Minister for the Environment (2019–2021) | 25 May 2016 | 5 February 2021 | 4 years, 256 days | Green | Stefan Löfven (S) |
| | Per Bolund | Per Bolund (born 1971) | Minister for the Environment; Minister for the Climate | 5 February 2021 | 30 November 2021 | 298 days | Green | Stefan Löfven (S) |
