= Marita Ulvskog =

Swedish politician and former MEP (born 1951)

Marita Ulvskog MEP
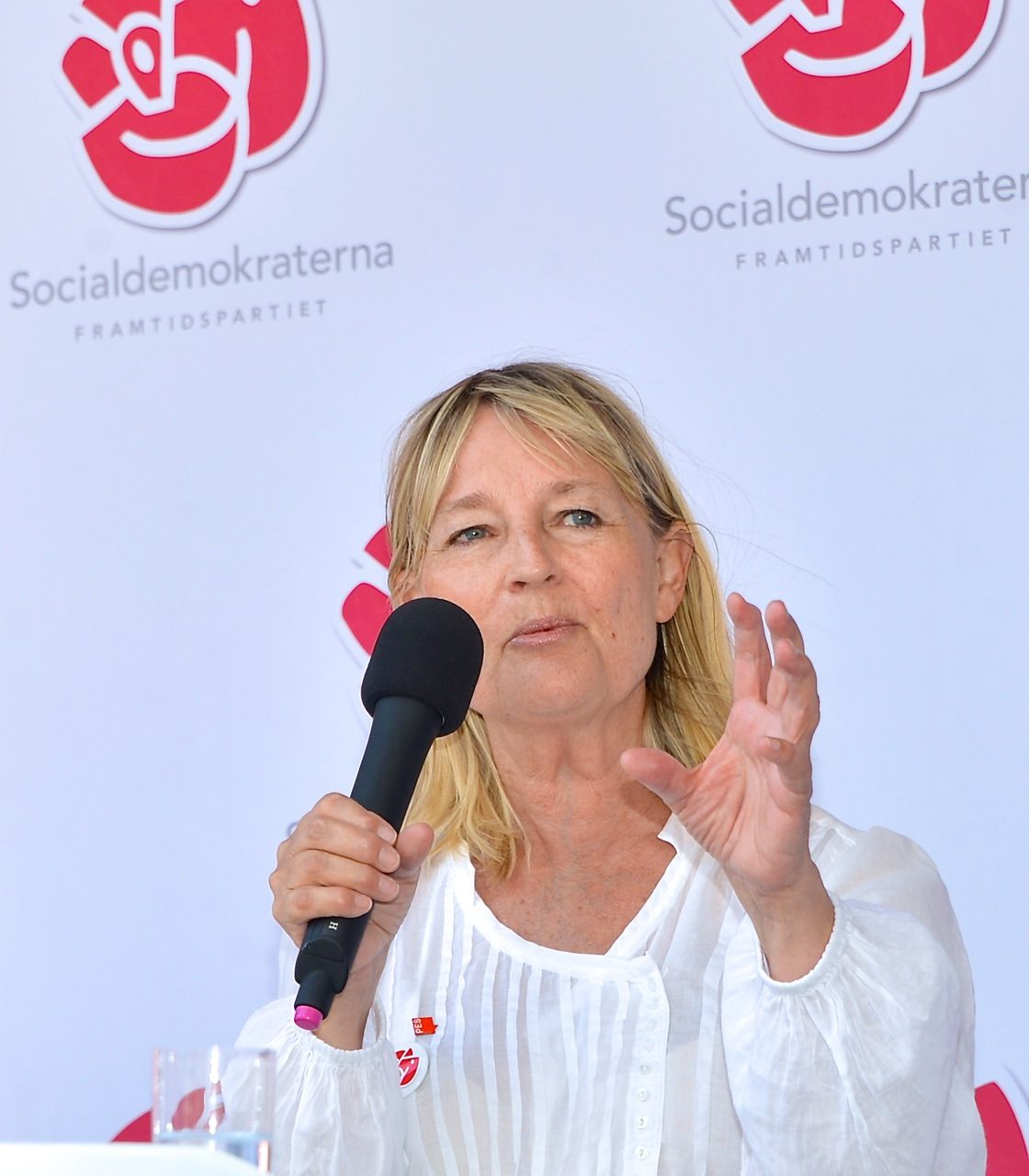
- Ulvskog delivering a speech at Sergels torg in Stockholm in May 2014

Member of the European Parliament
- In office 2009–2019
- Constituency: Sweden

Secretary of the Social Democratic Party
- In office 10 September 2004 – 10 March 2009
- Leader: Göran Persson; Mona Sahlin
- Preceded by: Lars Stjernkvist
- Succeeded by: Ibrahim Baylan

Acting Deputy Prime Minister of Sweden
- In office 31 October 2003 – 31 May 2004
- Prime Minister: Göran Persson
- Preceded by: Margareta Winberg
- Succeeded by: Lars Engqvist

Minister for Culture and Sports
- In office 22 March 1996 – 13 September 2004
- Prime Minister: Göran Persson
- Preceded by: Margot Wallström
- Succeeded by: Leif Pagrotsky

Minister for Civil Service Affairs
- In office 7 October 1994 – 22 March 1996
- Prime Minister: Ingvar Carlsson
- Preceded by: Inger Davidsson
- Succeeded by: Jörgen Andersson

Member of the Swedish Parliament
- In office 20 September 1998 – 16 June 2009
- Constituency: Gothenburg

Personal details
- Born: Marita Helena Ulvskog; 4 September 1951 (age 75) Luleå, Sweden
- Party: Swedish; Social Democratic Party; EU; Progressive Alliance of Socialists and Democrats
- Education: Stockholm University

Marita Elisabet Ulvskog (born 4 September 1951) is a Swedish politician who served as Member of the European Parliament from 2009 until 2019. She is a member of the Social Democrats, part of the Progressive Alliance of Socialists and Democrats.

== Early career ==
Ulvskog is a trained journalist and she worked for several years on the Journal of the Swedish Trade Union Confederation.

== Member of the Swedish Parliament, 1998–2009 ==
Ulvskog was a member of the Parliament of Sweden from 1998 to 2009. During that time, she was the Minister for Civil Service Affairs from 1994 to 1996 and Minister for Culture in the minority government led by Prime Minister Göran Persson from 1996 to 2004. She also served as the party secretary of the Social Democrats from 2004 to 2009.

== Member of the European Parliament, 2009–2019 ==
On 30 September 2008 it was revealed that Ulvskog would lead the Social Democrats in the 2009 European Parliament election although she during the 90's was involved in the critical debate on EU. She was elected with the strong support of personal votes and now serves as a Member of the European Parliament (MEP).

In Parliament, Ulvskog served as vice chair of the Committee on Employment and Social Affairs from 2014 until 2019. She was also a member of the Committee on Transport and Tourism. From 2009 until 2014, she served on the Committee on Industry, Research and Energy.

In addition to her committee assignments, Ulvskog serves ad a member of the European Parliament Intergroup on Western Sahara and the European Parliament Intergroup on the Welfare and Conservation of Animals.

Ulvskog was one of the four vice presidents of the Party of European Socialists, under the leadership of chairman Sergei Stanishev.

== Other activities ==
- Olof Palme International Center, Chair of the Board (2017-2018)
