= Lina Axelsson Kihlblom =

Swedish politician (born 1970)

Minister for Schools
- In office 30 November 2021 – 17 October 2022
- Prime Minister: Magdalena Andersson

Personal details
- Born: 24 June 1970 (age 56)
- Party: Social Democratic

Lina Axelsson Kihlblom (born 24 June 1970) is a Swedish politician for the Social Democratic party. From 30 November 2021 to 17 October 2022, she was the minister for schools in the Andersson cabinet. She is the first transgender cabinet minister in Swedish history. She transitioned in 1995.

During her transition, she studied and graduated with a Candidate of Law, and learned foreign languages. She has worked in Brussels with European Union law, and in the Swedish school system. After discussing her leadership of Ronna School in Södertälje on a Swedish Educational Broadcasting Company programme, she became known as the "Super-principal". She was also a member of the 2015 governmental School Commission.
