= Birgit Rodhe =

Swedish politician (1915–1998)

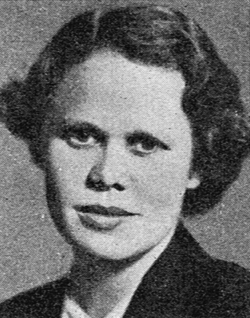
Birgit Rodhe

Birgit Karin Rodhe (née Grabe; 18 August 1915 – 19 November 1998) was a Swedish politician of the Liberal Party.

She served as deputy minister for education and minister for schools from 1978 to 1979.
