= Gun Hellsvik =

Swedish politician (1942–2016)

Minister for Justice
- In office 4 October 1991 – 7 October 1994
- Prime Minister: Carl Bildt
- Preceded by: Laila Freivalds
- Succeeded by: Laila Freivalds

Personal details
- Born: Gun Birgitta Blomgren; 27 September 1942 Ängelholm, Sweden
- Died: 14 November 2016 (aged 74)
- Party: Moderate
- Spouse: Per Hellsvik (m. 1966)

Gun Birgitta Hellsvik (née Blomgren; 27 September 1942 – 14 November 2016) was a Swedish politician for the Moderate Party, who served as Minister for Justice from 1991-1994.

A lawyer by training, she worked as a civil law lecturer at Lund University before becoming a full-time politician.

She served as Municipal commissioner of Lund 1983-1991, Minister for Justice 1991-1994, member of the Riksdag, chairman of the Riksdag Committee on Justice 1994-2001, President of the Nordic Council 1999, Director General of the Swedish Patent and Registration Office 2001-2007, and chairman of the board of the University of Borås 2004-2007. Social Democrat Laila Freivalds was both her predecessor and successor to the office of Minister for Justice.

Hellsvik was known for her tough stance on drugs. She opposed dispensing clean needles to drug addicts, arguing that it would undermine people's confidence in the legal system. As Minister of Justice, she oversaw a legal change that made it a crime to be under the influence of an illicit drug, even in the absence of drug possession; she also authorised the police to forcibly obtain urine and blood samples from a suspected individual. She lauded the American war on drugs, claiming that "as so many times before, the United States, is showing us the right path". In a motion to parliament entitled "Strong measures against narcotics" (Krafttag mot narkotika;) she supported lifetime imprisonment for narcotics crimes, allowing the police the take urine and blood samples from small children to promote early detection of drug abuse and to authorise the police to routinely induce vomiting in individuals suspected of having swallowed narcotics, among other things; the proposals were voted down by parliament.

Hellsvik died from cancer on 14 November 2016, at the age of 74.

Preceded by Laila Freivalds	Minister for Justice; 1991–1994	Succeeded by Laila Freivalds
