= Odd Engström =

Swedish politician (1941–1998)

Odd Erik Lennart Engström (20 September 1941 – 18 May 1998) was a politician of the Swedish Social Democratic Party. He was born in Silbodal, Årjäng, Värmland County, Sweden and was educated at University of Uppsala.

Engström served as one of two State Secretaries (the other was Ulf Larsson) to Prime Minister Olof Palme 1982–1983. From 1983 he served as Finance Secretary of Stockholm Municipality. From 1988 to 1990 he served as deputy Minister for Finance (Minister for Budget), and was the acting Minister for Finance for a short time in February 1990, after Kjell-Olof Feldt resigned. Engström then served as the Deputy Prime Minister of Sweden from 1990 to 1991. After the electoral loss of 1991, he was a member of the Parliament of Sweden from 1991 to 1993, when he resigned from his seat.

From 1995 he served as chairman of the board of investment company Kinnevik, where his friend Jan Stenbeck was the major owner. He was married to Gunilla Engström and has one son and one daughter.

Engström also did some amateur acting. In 1993 he had a small role in the TV series Morsarvet, which was set in his native Värmland.

Engström died of a heart attack at age 56. (According to journalist Jutta Rabe he died the day before he wanted to give an interview about the real cause of the sinking of the MS Estonia.)
