= Ingvar Carlsson =

Prime Minister of Sweden (1986–1991; 1994–1996)

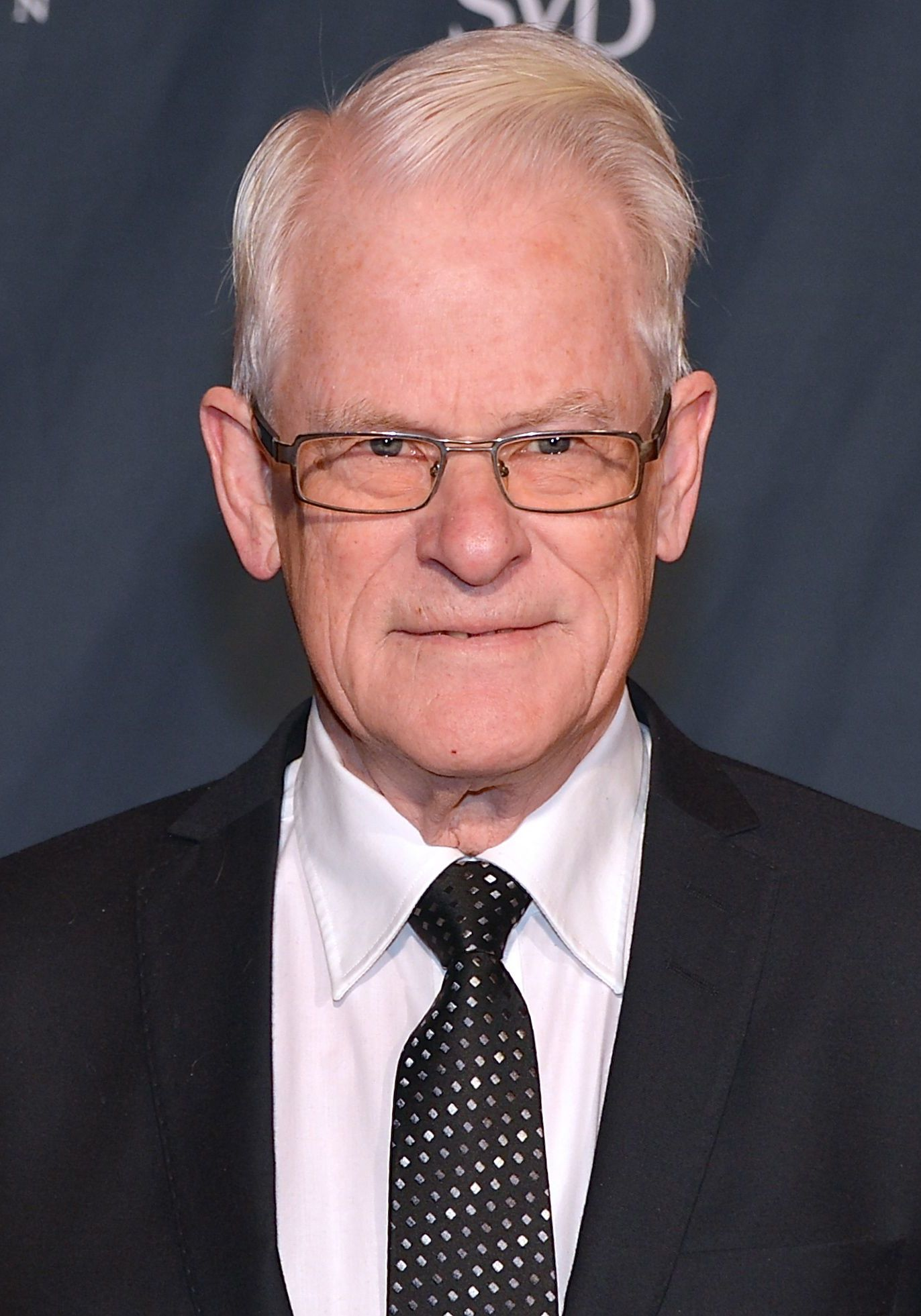
- Carlsson in 2013

Prime Minister of Sweden
- In office 7 October 1994 – 22 March 1996
- Monarch: Carl XVI Gustaf
- Deputy: Mona Sahlin; Lena Hjelm-Wallén
- Preceded by: Carl Bildt
- Succeeded by: Göran Persson
- In office 13 March 1986 (Note: Acting Prime Minister from 28 February to 12 March 1986) – 4 October 1991
- Monarch: Carl XVI Gustaf
- Deputy: Svante Lundkvist; Kjell-Olof Feldt; Lena Hjelm-Wallén; Odd Engström
- Preceded by: Olof Palme
- Succeeded by: Carl Bildt

Leader of the Opposition
- In office 4 October 1991 – 7 October 1994
- Monarch: Carl XVI Gustaf
- Prime Minister: Carl Bildt
- Preceded by: Carl Bildt
- Succeeded by: Carl Bildt

Leader of the Social Democratic Party
- In office 3 March 1986 – 15 March 1996
- Preceded by: Olof Palme
- Succeeded by: Göran Persson
Positions held under Palme
Deputy Prime Minister of Sweden
In office 8 October 1982 – 28 February 1986
Prime Minister	Olof Palme
Preceded by	Ola Ullsten
Succeeded by	Svante Lundkvist (Acting)
Minister for Housing
In office 1 January 1974 – 8 October 1976
Prime Minister	Olof Palme
Preceded by	Office established
Succeeded by	Elvy Olsson
Minister for Education
In office 14 October 1969 – 2 November 1973
Prime Minister	Olof Palme
Preceded by	Olof Palme
Succeeded by	Bertil Zachrisson

Personal details
- Born: Gösta Ingvar Carlsson; 9 November 1934 (age 92) Borås, Sweden
- Party: Social Democratic
- Spouse: Ingrid Carlsson (m. 1957; died 2026)
- Children: 2
- Education: Lund University; Northwestern University
- Profession: Business economist
- Cabinet: I; II; III

Military service
- Allegiance: Sweden
- Branch/service: Swedish Army

Gösta Ingvar Carlsson (born 9 November 1934) is a Swedish retired politician who served as Prime Minister of Sweden from 1986 to 1991 and again from 1994 to 1996. He was leader of the Swedish Social Democratic Party from 1986 to 1996. He led Sweden into the European Union.

Carlsson was a member of the Riksdag from 1965 to 1996 representing the constituency of Stockholm County (until 1970 in the lower house). He served as Minister of Education from 1969 to 1973, as Minister of Housing in 1973 and again from 1974 to 1976, and as Minister of Environmental affairs from 1985 to 1986. He served as deputy prime minister from 1982 to 1986, and assumed office as Prime Minister of Sweden upon the assassination of Prime Minister Olof Palme in 1986.

== Early life ==
Gösta Ingvar Carlsson was born in Borås, Västra Götaland County (then Älvsborg County), Sweden and is the third son of the warehouse worker Olof Karlsson and Ida, née Johansson. At the age of 12, Carlsson found his father dead on the floor of the coffee roastery where he worked.

Carlsson has a diploma in business economics and a degree in political science from Lund University. In Lund he met with Tage Erlander, the Swedish prime minister, and his aide Olof Palme, later to become Erlander's successor. He graduated in 1952. He would receive an honorary doctorate from Lund University in 1989.

== Early political career ==
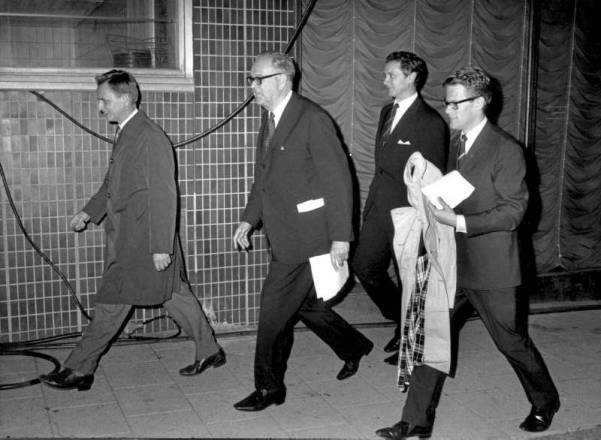
Carlsson (far right) in 1968, with Olof Palme (left), Tage Erlander (center), and Sten Andersson (right).

After finishing studies Carlsson got a job in Erlander's staff, along with other young aides such as Palme and Bengt K. Å. Johansson. Erlander called this group "the boys". In 1965, Carlsson attended Northwestern University in Illinois in the United States as a Fulbright scholar studying economics. After returning home, he was elected member of the Swedish Parliament. In the same year, he also became leader of the Swedish Social Democratic Youth League. He had the following ministerial posts: Minister of Education 1969–1973, Minister of Housing 1973–1976, deputy prime minister 1982–1986.

In 1984, Carlsson announced an increase in government spending on research and development, to rise by 2% more than inflation. This came amid wider budget cuts, when several departments saw their spending reduced by the same percentage. He was deputy prime minister to Prime Minister Olof Palme when Palme was assassinated.

== Prime minister ==
=== First premiership (1986–1991) ===
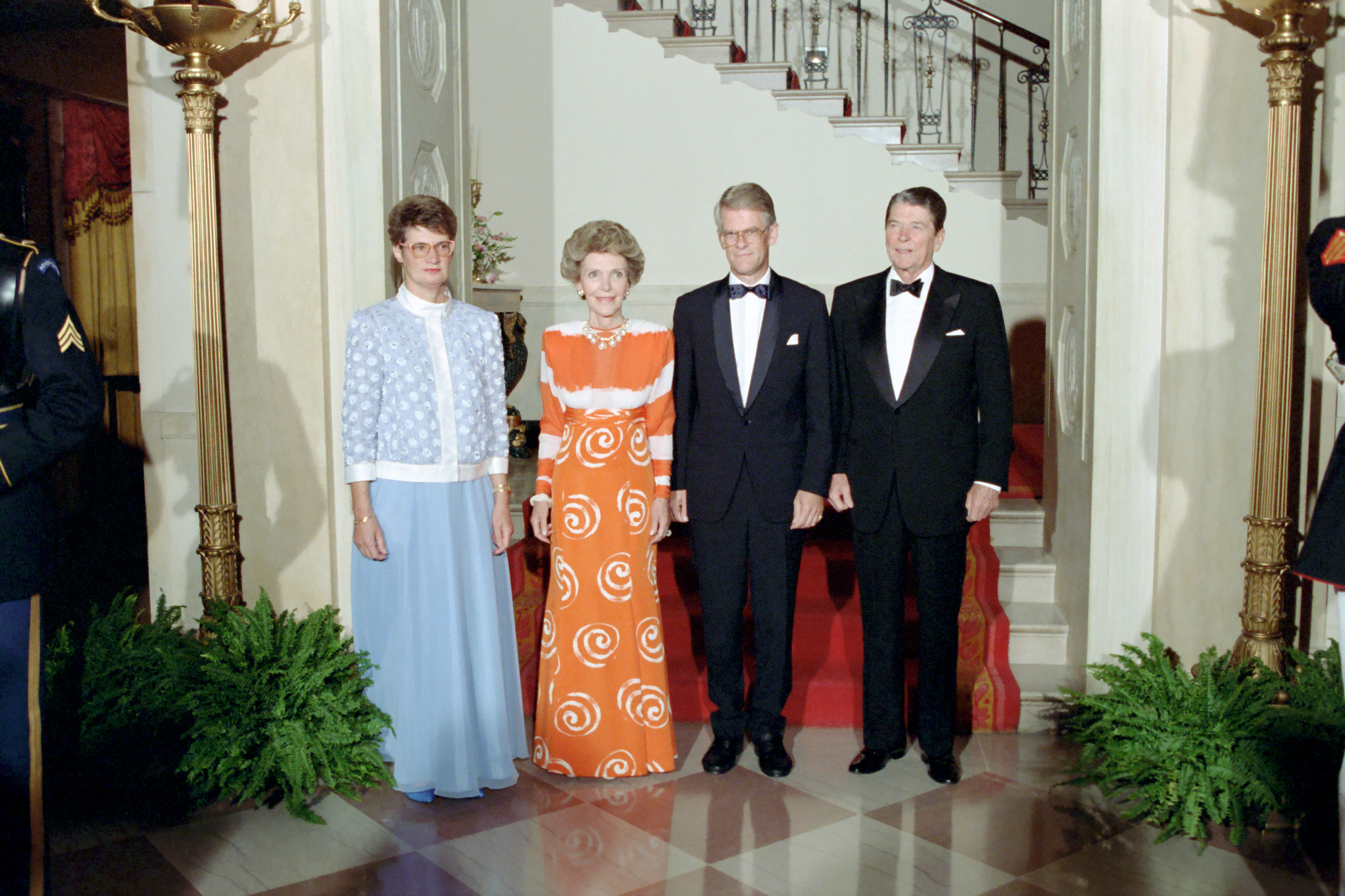
Carlsson (right), with wife Ingrid (far left), First Lady Nancy Reagan (left), and President Ronald Reagan (far right), in a 1987 visit to the White House.

Following the assassination of Olof Palme in 1986, Ingvar Carlsson became the new prime minister and party leader. In the weeks following the assassination, Carlsson garnered record-high approval ratings. Carlsson's first government was formed on 12 March of that year.

Together with Minister for Finance Kjell-Olof Feldt, the government turned a budget deficit of 90 billion SEK to a surplus of a few hundred billion SEK, which initially led to large investments and record low unemployment. 1980s Social Democratic neoliberal measures—such as depressing and deregulating the currency to prop up Swedish exports during the economic restructuring transition, dropping corporate taxation and taxation on high income-earners, and switching from anti-unemployment policies to anti-inflationary policies—were exacerbated by international recession, unchecked currency speculation, and a centre-right government led by Carl Bildt (1991–1994), creating the fiscal crisis of the early 1990s.

However, Sweden's economy began to deteriorate in the early 1990s. In 1990 the Carlsson cabinet resigned after failing to gain a majority for its economic policy agenda, but was reinstated immediately with a slightly changed agenda.

In April 1986, Carlsson visited the Soviet Union and its leader Mikhail Gorbachev, as part of an effort to ease Swedish–Soviet relations. The trip had been planned by Palme, but was undertaken by Carlsson instead due to the assassination. In 1987, he visited United States President Ronald Reagan at the White House, becoming the first Swedish prime minister to visit a U.S. president since Erlander met John F. Kennedy in 1961.

The Chernobyl disaster in Soviet Ukraine took place in 1986, and Sweden was the first country to alert the world of the nuclear accident. The accident had negative repercussions for Sweden, with the country losing an estimated $144 million in ruined food, the livelihood of 15,000 nomadic Swedish Sámis, and various forests, crops, and wildlife were contaminated with radiation. Carlsson had previously supported Sweden's nuclear power program, stating that "My country is not a toy shop. It needs energy." In a 1980 referendum, Swedes had voted to phase out their nuclear reactors by 2010. Immediately after the accident, Carlsson appointed a government commission to determine if the process of shutting down the reactors should be sped up. As reports of the effect on food worsened, Carlsson took stronger anti-nuclear stances. The accident also lead to a deterioration in Swedish–Soviet public relations, as many in the Swedish public blamed the Soviets for the disaster. Energy minister Birgitta Dahl in particular criticized the Soviets for delaying the announcement of the disaster. Carlsson gave conflicting answers as to whether the incident would affect relations between the two countries.

Going into the 1988 general election, Carlsson was viewed as less divisive along party lines compared to his predecessor Palme. In the election, held on 18 September, although the party lost 3 seats, Carlsson and the Social Democrats were able to remain in power, ending with 156 seats out of 349. The centre-right Moderate Party, Liberal Party, and Centre Party collectively lost 19 seats, while the Communist Party won 2 new seats and the Green Party became the first new party to enter the Riksdag in decades.

The 1991 election saw losses for Sweden's left-wing parties. The Social Democrats lost 18 seats, the Left Party lost 5, and the Greens fell below the 4% threshold to maintain any seats in the Riksdag. The Liberals and Centrists both lost 11 seats. The Moderates gained 14 more seats, while two new right-wing parties, the Christian Democrats and New Democracy, entered the Riksdag, with 26 and 25 seats respectively. Carlsson was then succeeded as prime minister by Moderate leader Carl Bildt, who headed a new four-party right-wing cabinet.

The elections in 1994 saw a turnaround for the Social Democrats. Although the Moderates maintained their 80 seats and saw a slight percentage increase, all of the other right-wing coalition partners lost seats, and New Democracy fell below the 4% threshold. The Social Democrats won 23 new seats and saw their percentage increase to 45%. As a result, the Social Democrats returned to power, with Carlsson again becoming prime minister and a new government.

=== Second premiership (1994–1996) ===
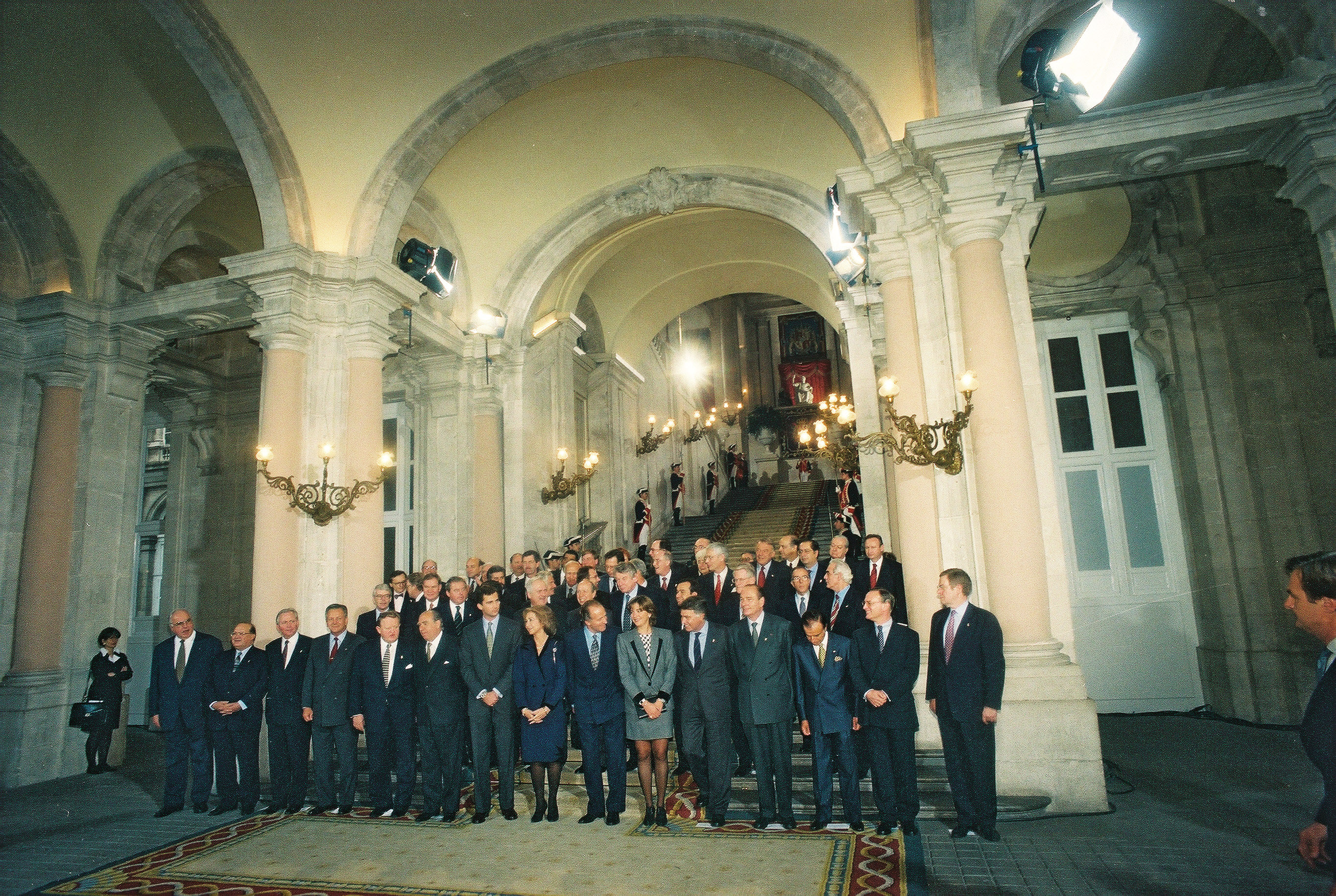
A 1995 meeting of the European Council in Madrid. Carlsson is the third from the right in the second row, behind French President Jacques Chirac.

The Social Democrats lost the elections in 1991, but Carlsson returned to power after the elections in 1994. When the Social Democrats returned to power in 1994, they responded to the fiscal crisis by stabilizing the currency—and by reducing the welfare state and privatizing public services and goods, as governments did in many countries influenced by Milton Friedman, the Chicago Schools of political and economic thought, and the neoliberal movement. As prime minister, he also carried out a comprehensive reform of the tax system.

After three years in opposition and an election victory in the 1994 elections, Carlsson formed a new government. This government realigned its focus on cleaning up Swedish Government finances, and the task was assigned to the newly appointed Minister of Finance Göran Persson. The ensuing governing period was difficult and it was strongly criticized by trade unions and party members for government service cuts and tax increases that were instituted. On 19 December 1994, Carlsson announced the decision not to recover the wreck of the MS Estonia, or even the bodies of the victims of the disaster.

Bildt's government had significantly cut taxes, although they were still considered high. In his second government, Carlsson reduced some welfare benefits and halved the value-added food tax. However, he also raised the top marginal income tax rates on the wealthiest, and tax revenue increased as the decade progressed.

Carlsson pushed for Sweden to join the European Union, seeing it as necessary for Sweden to strengthen its economy, although other members of his party were sceptical of the idea. After four years of negotiations and a large campaign credited with increasing EU support, a national referendum was held on 13 October 1994, with 83% voter turnout (the highest for a Swedish referendum up to that point), and 52.3% voting to join. Sweden joined in January 1995 alongside Austria and Finland. After joining, Carlsson was critical of the lack of gender diversity in EU institutions, stating in a ministerial meeting that "we don't do it this way in Sweden".

Sweden held an election for the European Parliament in September 1995. The pro-European Social Democrats received only 28% of the vote, while the Eurosceptic Left Party and Green Party together won 30%. The Social Democrats' poor showing was seen as a major blow to Carlsson.

In August 1995, Ingvar Carlsson announced that he would resign as party leader and Swedish Prime Minister. His successor was long considered to be the then Minister of Equality and Deputy Prime Minister Mona Sahlin. However, due to the so-called Toblerone Affair, she took back her candidacy and also later resigned from the government. On 5 December 1995, the nominating committee proposed the Minister for Finance, Göran Persson, as the new party leader candidate. He was elected on 15 March 1996 at the Social Democratic Party Congress as party leader and on 22 March 1996 he was elected prime minister.

== Later life ==
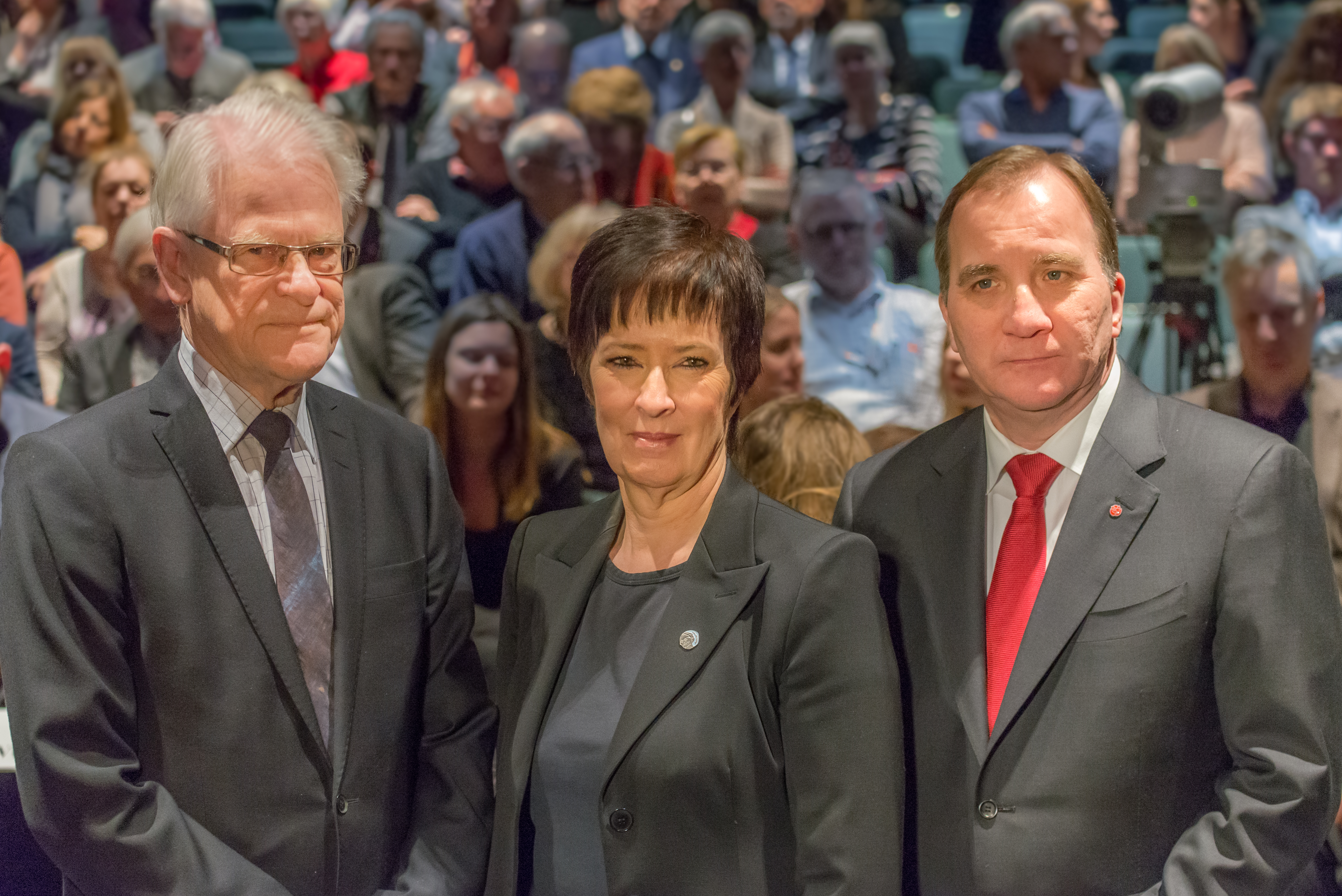
Carlsson (left), in 2016 with Mona Sahlin (center), and Prime Minister Stefan Löfven, photo by Frankie Fouganthin

Ingvar Carlsson was Chairman of the inquiry after the Gothenburg Riots of 2001 to investigate the events. Their report was submitted to the Government on 14 January 2003.

Ingvar Carlsson was the Chairman of the Independent Inquiry into United Nations actions during the 1994 Rwandan genocide. He is also chairman of the Bergman Foundation Center on Fårö.

With Shridath Ramphal, he was in 1995 one of the co-chairs of the Commission on Global Governance, which reported on issues of international development, international security, globalization and global governance.

In 2024, he was made the first honorary member of Lund University.

His career has been shaped by the heritage of Olof Palme, with whom he worked closely, but his policies are more seen as being a continuation of the legacy established by Tage Erlander.

== Personal life ==
On 10 July 1957 Carlsson married librarian Ingrid Melander (9 April 1934 – 6 April 2026), daughter of the wholesaler Sven H. Melander and Gerda Melander (née Eriksson). They have two daughters and three grandchildren. In 2012, Ingrid was diagnosed with Alzheimer's disease, and by 2024 Carlsson had her placed in a nursing home in Tyresö, where he visited her three times a week. She died on 6 April 2026. As of 2023, he lives in an apartment in the same municipality.

Ingvar Carlsson is a big supporter of football teams IF Elfsborg and Wolverhampton Wanderers F.C.

== Awards and decorations ==
- (Sweden) H. M. The King's Medal, 12th size gold medal worn around the neck on a chain of gold (silver-gilt) (1996)
- (France) Commander of the Legion of Honour (17 February 2017)

== Honours ==
- Honorary doctor of philosophy, Lund University (1989)
- Honorary degree, Northwestern University (1991)
- Honorary doctor of technology, Luleå University of Technology (1996)

== Bibliography ==
- Carlsson, Ingvar (2014). Lärdomar: personliga och politiska (in Swedish). Stockholm: Norstedt. ISBN 9789113052687.
- Carlsson, Ingvar; Lindgren, Anne-Marie (2007) [1974]. Vad är socialdemokrati?: en bok om idéer och utmaningar (in Swedish) ([New edi.] ed.). Stockholm: Arbetarrörelsens tankesmedja. ISBN 978-91-976756-0-4.
- Carlsson, Ingvar (2003). Så tänkte jag: politik & dramatik (in Swedish) (1st ed.). Stockholm: Hjalmarson & Högberg. ISBN 91-89660-22-6.
- Carlsson, Ingvar (1999). Ur skuggan av Olof Palme (in Swedish). Stockholm: Hjalmarson & Högberg. ISBN 91-89080-37-8.
- Carlsson, Ingvar (1994). Tillväxt och rättvisa (in Swedish). Stockholm: Tiden. ISBN 91-550-4167-1.

== Notes ==
Political offices
Preceded by Olof Palme	Minister for Education; 1969–1973	Succeeded by Bertil Zachrisson
New title	Minister for Housing; 1974–1976	Succeeded by Elvy Olsson
Preceded by Ola Ullsten	Deputy Prime Minister of Sweden; 1982–1986	Succeeded by Svante Lundkvist
New title	Minister for the Environment; 1985–1986	Succeeded by Birgitta Dahl
Preceded by Olof Palme	Prime Minister of Sweden; 1986–1991	Succeeded by Carl Bildt
Preceded by Carl Bildt	Leader of the Opposition; 1991–1994	Succeeded by Carl Bildt
Preceded by Carl Bildt	Prime Minister of Sweden; 1994–1996	Succeeded by Göran Persson
Party political offices
Preceded by Olof Palme	Leader of the Social Democratic Party; 1986–1996	Succeeded by Göran Persson
Order of precedence
Preceded by Urban Ahlin as former Speaker of the Riksdag	Swedish order of precedence as former Prime Minister	Succeeded by Göran Persson as former Prime Minister
