= Natasha Falle =

Canadian academic

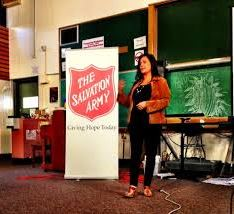
- Natasha Falle speaking at an event hosted by The Salvation Army
- Born: 1973 (age 52–53)
- Education: George Brown College
- Occupations: Professor; Public speaker; Former prostitute
- Employer(s): Humber College; Toronto Police Service
- Known for: Advocating that Sweden's Sex Purchase Act be adopted in Canada

Natasha Falle (born 1973) is a Canadian professor at Humber College in Toronto, Ontario, Canada, who was forcibly prostituted from the ages of 15 to 27 and now opposes prostitution in Canada. Falle grew up in a middle-class home and, when her parents divorced, her new single-parent home became unsafe, and Falle ran away from home. At the age of 15, Falle became involved in the sex industry in Calgary, Alberta.

Falle's pimp kept her falsely imprisoned and trafficked her across the country. He married her and tortured her, breaking several of her bones and burning her body. In order to cope with the trauma of prostitution and violence, Falle became dependent on cocaine and almost died. Eventually, she got out of prostitution and, with her mother's support, went through drug rehabilitation, finished high school, and eventually received a diploma in Wife Assault and Child Advocacy from George Brown College.

In 2001, Falle began counselling women in prostitution at Streetlight Support Services, and counselled more than 800 women in the subsequent decade, 97% of whom wrote on their intake surveys that they wanted to exit the sex industry. In order to make this statistic more widely known, Falle founded Sex Trade 101. She began offering training for police and partners with the Toronto Police Service's sex crimes unit. Falle was one of the main proponents of Member of Parliament (MP) Joy Smith's private member's bill, Bill C-268, which was passed in June 2010 as An Act to amend the Criminal Code (minimum sentence for offences involving trafficking of persons under the age of eighteen years), and she helped the Canadian government formulate their appeal of the decision of the Ontario Superior Court of Justice in Bedford v. Canada to strike down various prostitution laws. Falle advocates adopting a law in Canada analogous to Sweden's Sex Purchase Act, which would decriminalize the selling of sex and criminalize the purchasing of sex.

== Early life ==
Natasha Falle grew up in a middle-class home in Nova Scotia, a suburb of Toronto, Ontario, and a suburb of Calgary, Alberta. Her mother managed stores in the wedding industry and her father was a police officer with a vice squad, arresting drug dealers and pimps. While she was growing up, Falle had multiple family members with addictions. When she was a young teenager, Falle's parents divorced, and she subsequently lived in a single-parent home with her mother. They moved into an apartment in downtown Toronto. Falle's father did not pay her mother alimony and there was often no money for food, so Falle began stealing food to survive.

Falle had no role models. She began writing poetry about suicide and wearing black clothing. She acted out by stealing cars and using drugs recreationally. She started out with soft drugs and then moved on to using psychedelic mushrooms and LSD. Her associates in these criminal activities, who came from similarly dysfunctional backgrounds, provided her with a sense of belonging that she no longer found at home. Falle's mother had a series of boyfriends who abused her and made the house unsafe, so Falle ran away from home. She slept at friends' houses, on their couches and in tents in their backyards, concealing her presence from her friends' parents.

== Prostitution ==
=== Initiation ===
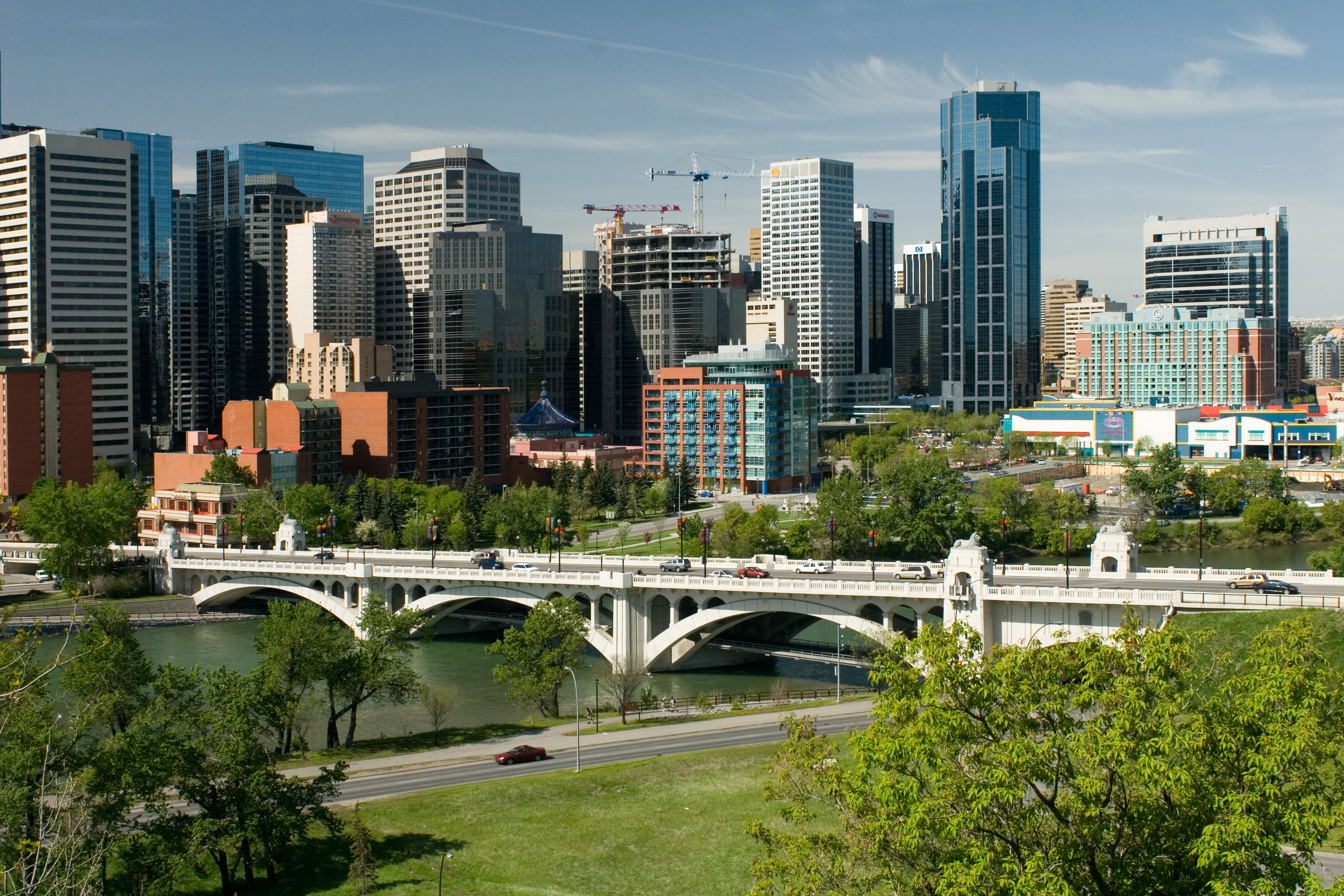
Natasha Falle entered the sex industry at the age of 15 in Chinatown, Calgary.

After she turned 15, Falle had her first experience in the sex industry at a party in a bar in Chinatown, Calgary. A 25-year-old man at the party who had forged identity documents convinced her to sell sex for money and give him half of her earnings. Falle found this man well-dressed and attractive and did not think that he fit the stereotypical image of a pimp. She had nowhere to sleep that night and had no money for food, so she accepted his offer. The man to whom she sold sex that night had teeth that were rotten. They had sex on a soiled mattress in a poorly-ventilated restaurant attic, and she received $100.

Falle convinced five of her friends who came from dysfunctional homes to join her in prostitution. Falle said that she and the other girls she knew her age who had gone into prostitution had felt as though that was their only remaining option. She said they all tried to stay free of pimps, organized crime, and drugs, but eventually succumbed. Falle later said, "We were prey for every paedophile, pervert, pimp and drug dealer that was out there." The man who had recruited Falle in Chinatown became her pimp. Adults began advertising Falle's sexual services in newspapers. Falle engaged in both indoor and outdoor prostitution, working as an escort, in strip clubs, and at massage parlours. At the legal establishments where she engaged in prostitution, escort drivers engaged in organized crime, selling guns, alcohol, cocaine, and stolen goods and pimping children in massage parlours.

=== Abuse ===
I couldn't admit that I was not there by choice. We couldn't live in our own skin if we admitted that. We needed to believe that it was our choice.

— Natasha Falle, discussing her time in the sex industry

Falle's pimp kept her imprisoned for the years that he prostituted her, and trafficked her across Canada to Edmonton, Vancouver, and Kelowna. Falle later said of herself and the other women in prostitution she knew, "I couldn't admit that I was not there by choice. We couldn't live in our own skin if we admitted that. We needed to believe that it was our choice." Falle's pimp told her he would marry her if she made enough money for him through prostitution. When she had made the amount of money her pimp required, she was 17 years old. The two got married that year.

Falle's pimp regularly beat her and she began to suffer from battered person syndrome. The worst beating she received was in a brothel where she and four other teenagers engaged in prostitution. Over the years that she was married to her pimp, she hoped he would change. She later said that she "wanted to love him, believe he'd never do it again." She tried to make him enough money through prostitution to convince him not to find another girl. He threatened her family, and conditioned her not to call the police. Fear of being labelled a "snitch" or "rat" prevented her from going to the police. None of the other women she knew in the sex industry were in healthy relationships. At her peak, Falle owned a Ford Mustang, bought her pimp a Mercedes-Benz, and lived in a four-bedroom penthouse apartment, but she continued to experience violence. She used her material possessions to elevate herself above the women around her who were dependent on cocaine; she dismissed them as "crackheads" and "crackhoes".

Some of the men who purchased sex with Falle were police officers, and she knew girls who used drugs with their drug counselors. Falle was brainwashed to believe that her only worth lay in prostitution, which she later said was why it took her so long to exit prostitution. While engaging in prostitution, Falle was frequently threatened by other women in the sex industry, she was verbally abused by her clients, she was stalked, and she was threatened with guns on multiple occasions, including by her pimp. She was also drugged several times, and was once sexually assaulted by an escort driver after having been drugged by him. At one point, she was kidnapped. She had to resort to pulling a knife on people at times when she was threatened with violence. Because of various instances of violence during her time in prostitution, Falle was injured in a variety of ways. Her pimp broke several of her bones and burned her body.

=== Effects and aftermath ===
In order to cope with the psychological trauma of prostitution and violence, Falle became dependent on cocaine. Within two years, she was spending $500 per night on cocaine. Her drug use resulted in delusions and caused her to become schizophrenic, and subsequently distrustful of those around her, fearing that people were coming to take away her drugs.

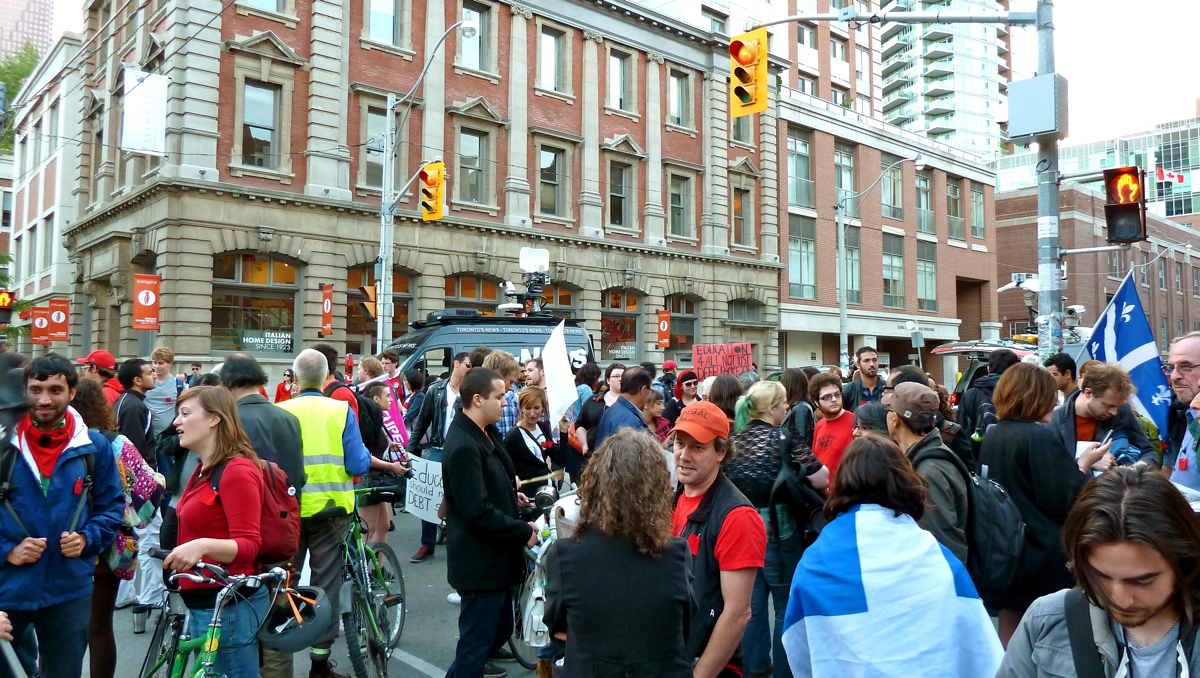
After leaving prostitution, Natasha Falle studied Wife Assault and Child Advocacy at George Brown College, graduating with honours.

Eventually, the personal horror stories Falle heard from other women in her situation convinced her that she needed to get out of prostitution. Her substance dependence became so severe that she almost died. Her best friend was killed by her pimp. By this point, many of her friends in the sex industry had died, and she thought that she would be next. One night, Falle was hiding alone in a hotel room when she found a Bible placed there by Gideons International. She began reading the Psalms and later said, "For the first time I understood what God was saying to me. That night my life began to move in a new direction." On her 27th birthday, Falle left her husband and returned to her mother. Because of the delusions, Falle did not recognize her mother, thinking she had been replaced with a clone. Falle told her mother about being dependent on cocaine, entering prostitution, and marrying her pimp. Her mother accepted her back. It took several more years before Falle gave up hope that her husband would change.

Falle participated in a diversion program that allowed her to return to school. She said that she required a lot of support in order to fully exit prostitution, and found that support in her mother, her school, and Streetlight Support Services. Falle underwent a month of drug rehabilitation, which convinced her to become a counsellor. She then spent 90 days at the Toronto West Detention Centre and took seven months to finish high school. She went on to graduate from a college and a university. She received a diploma in Wife Assault and Child Advocacy from George Brown College and graduated with honours. To remove the burns her pimp had inflicted on her, she had laser surgery that cost thousands of dollars.

Falle uses the term "sex trade survivor" to describe herself. In 2012, Falle sought to bring a lawsuit against her former pimp to demonstrate to other women who are or have been forcibly prostituted that it is possible to oppose one's pimp. In 2013, she said that, while she has left much aggression and profanity behind since leaving the sex industry, some of the issues that she developed will stick with her until the end of her life. Jonathan Migneault of the Sudbury Star wrote that "Falle's story about her descent in and escape from prostitution is so horrific you almost don't believe the details." Sam Pazzano of the Toronto Sun wrote that, after 12 years of prostitution, Falle still has "attractive looks and [a] sharp mind."

== Activism ==
=== Streetlight Support Services ===
In 2001, Falle began counselling women in prostitution at Streetlight Support Services. Once she received her diploma from George Brown College, she redeveloped the organization's Choices program, a four-week program that helps women leave prostitution. Between 1997 and 2005, Choices helped 325 women out of the sex trade. Women entered into the program through the criminal justice system after being arrested for offences related to prostitution. By 2011, Falle had counselled more than 800 women. Of these women, 97% wrote on their intake surveys that they wanted to exit the sex industry, and 95% wrote that they had been physically abused by either a pimp, a client, or another woman in the sex industry. Falle believed these statistics to be representative of women in prostitution in Canada because the women she counselled did not come to her by choice; they were required to undergo the counselling by court order. In 2010, Falle said that hundreds of the women she had met were controlled by pimps, either as sexual partners or as traffickers. She also said that women in prostitution tend to be moved around a lot because they tend to fetch higher prices when they are new to a region. One of the women she counselled through Streetlight Support Services had been kept in a closet when she was not providing sexual services to men.

=== Sex Trade 101 ===
Because Streetlight Support Services is administered by the office of the Attorney General of Ontario, Falle could not be politically active in her capacity as a counsellor with them. Falle said, "I couldn't be silent anymore, because the strong voices that we were hearing were the minority few saying [prostitution] is liberating, it's a job choice ... I couldn't stand that lie anymore." She said that this minority only want to continue in prostitution because "they've never had a healthy comparison." Falle founded and became the director of Sex Trade 101, a Toronto-based nonprofit organization dedicated to protecting the rights of women who have been in prostitution. She founded Sex Trade 101 because she saw women in the sex industry as victims rather than as criminals, and she believed that the Criminal Code depicted them as criminals. She founded the organization in order to make it more widely known that the vast majority of women in the sex industry want to leave. She met many women who had no family to support them in exiting the sex industry, and she decided to found an organization to provide that support. The organization helps prostitution victims exit the sex industry and improve their lives.

Sex Trade 101 calls itself "Toronto's only sex trade survivors and abolitionist organization" and is composed of 12 women who had escaped forced prostitution and who offer training for police in order to change perceptions about people involved in the sex trade. The organization is also involved in prevention work in high schools. The organization offers mentorship and peer support groups for women who are currently or were formerly in prostitution. It also partners with other organizations including the Servants Anonymous Society of Calgary and Sheatre, an Owen Sound-based interactive theatre company. In 2012, Falle and Bridget Perrier represented Sex Trade 101 in Owen Sound where they launched ReStart, a mentorship program to aid women and youth who are at risk of sexual victimization, to help people exit the sex trade, and to provide support once they have exited. At the workshop that launched this program, Falle said that some people in the sex industry engage in survival sex—trading sex for food, a place to sleep, alcohol, drugs, or the feeling that they are loved. She said that rural communities are common places for women and children to be groomed into prostitution. She identified Bruce—Grey—Owen Sound as particularly vulnerable because of the substance abuse in the area. By 2013, Sex Trade 101 had served more than 1,000 women. In May 2012, Falle spoke about human trafficking at high schools in Vancouver primarily because of the influence of a parent concerned about human trafficking in the area and its dangers to children.

=== Police ===
Falle is a professor at Humber College in Toronto, where she teaches in the police foundations program, educating on the subject of social justice. One of her students, Brittany Swartzentruber, said that Falle's lectures would have a significant impact on Swartzentruber's career as a police officer, saying, "She was one of the best speakers I have ever heard." Falle partners with the Toronto Police Service's sex crimes unit, which developed the statistic that the average age for a girl to become involved in prostitution in Canada is 14. According to Falle's research, the average age is between 13 and 16. York Regional Police drugs and vice unit Detective Thai Truong said that all law enforcement personnel should hear stories like Falle's because "they remind us that they are not just prostitutes or escorts, but they are somebody's daughter, somebody's sister, somebody's wife."

=== Bill C-268 ===
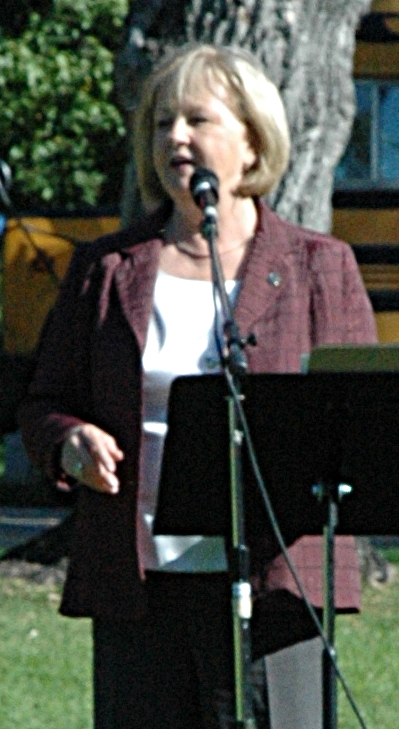
Natasha Falle called Member of Parliament Joy Smith (pictured) an angel for speaking out against prostitution.

In June 2010, Kildonan—St. Paul Member of Parliament (MP) Joy Smith's private member's bill, Bill C-268, was passed as An Act to amend the Criminal Code (minimum sentence for offences involving trafficking of persons under the age of eighteen years). Falle was one of the bill's five main proponents, the others being Timea Nagy, a woman who was trafficked from Hungary to Canada at the age of 20 and kept as a sex slave in a strip club; Tamara Cherry, a Toronto Sun journalist who writes about human trafficking in Canada; Brian McConaghy, a former RCMP officer who works with Ratanak International—another anti-human-trafficking organization; and Grand Chief of the Assembly of Manitoba Chiefs Ron Evans, who raised awareness about victims of the sex industry in Manitoba. Later that year, Falle said that the best way to fight human trafficking is to influence public opinion.

Later in 2010 in Winnipeg, Falle received an award at the first annual Honouring Heroes ceremony, which was organized by Joy Smith, who is also an anti-human-trafficking activist. Falle called Smith an angel, saying, "It's only been in the last few years since all those missing and murdered aboriginal women turned up dead did anybody care about us. So to have her speak out the way she is against [prostitution] is so empowering." Falle was one of five award recipients at the ceremony, the other four being the other primary proponents of Bill C-268.

=== Bedford v. Canada ===
Falle took a sustained interest in Bedford v. Canada, a case that began in the fall of 2010 when laws against keeping a brothel, communicating in order to facilitate prostitution, and living off the avails of prostitution were struck down by the Ontario Superior Court of Justice as unconstitutional. When Falle first heard about this decision, she cried, and expressed surprise and disappointment. She said that she did not believe that the average Canadian realized the implications of striking down these laws, which she said were that "your next door neighbours can run a brothel right beside you. Your children could be exposed to condoms left on their driveway, johns propositioning them." She also expressed her concern that striking down anti-prostitution laws normalizes prostitution as a career option for children to consider. She also said that, without the laws, "pimps will be legitimate businesspeople [and] billboards advertising brothels could start appearing on roadsides." Ron Marzel, a lawyer attempting to have the anti-prostitution laws declared unconstitutional, said, "the reality is there are consenting adults who want to go into" prostitution. Falle was angered by this statement, and replied that 97% of women in the sex industry are not engaging in prostitution by choice, and that "the voices of the overwhelming majority of women who want to get out of prostitution are being drowned out by a vocal few."

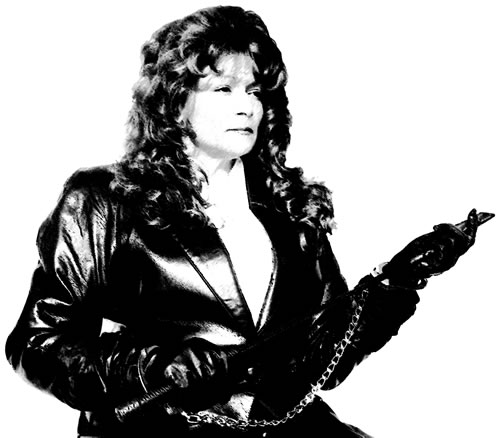
In Bedford v. Canada, Natasha Falle helped the Government of Canada formulate their case against Terri-Jean Bedford (pictured).

The Government of Canada disagreed with Ontario's ruling and announced that the decision would be appealed. Falle helped the Crown formulate their case. That November, Falle was a panelist at a debate about the case. At the debate, which was hosted by the Queen's Law and Public Policy Club at Queen's University, Falle said that, whatever the outcome of the appeal, she was glad that the case was removing the taboos surrounding talking about prostitution. The following June, Falle and more than twelve others intervened in the case, arguing that the laws should be reinstated to protect women from pimps. As part of this anti-prostitution coalition, Falle said that all areas of the sex industry are unsafe, including escort agencies and strip clubs. Falle testified in the lower courts, saying that "the more they say the women are there by choice, the harder it is for us to convince police, social workers and everyone else that these people are vulnerable." She also said that striking down anti-prostitution laws sends a message to men that it is acceptable to harass women. Falle said that all the applicants in Bedford v. Canada—including Terri-Jean Bedford, the dominatrix seeking to have the anti-brothel law struck down—entered the sex industry as children. For this reason, Falle argued that neither of these women chose a life of prostitution as a consenting adult; that life had already been chosen for them by the time that they had reached the age of consent. Falle encouraged Canadians to take an interest in Bedford v. Canada because any Canadian girl can become a victim of prostitution.

Eventually, the laws against pimping and communicating provisions were determined to be constitutional and were retained. As of 2013, the constitutionality of the law against brothels was still under review. Falle said that brothels should not be legalized, saying, "I know firsthand and... from the disclosures of the many women that I've been able to counsel over the years that most violence happens behind closed doors." Falle said that if brothels were legalized, the police would have less legal ability to find women and children victimized by human trafficking. Bedford said that legalizing brothels would make prostitution safer for women because it would allow prostitution to take place indoors. Falle responded that most prostitution has already moved indoors, as the internet has made most street solicitation unnecessary, and argues that the move indoors has not made the women safer. She said that when she was in prostitution, she was even a little safer outdoors because of the added visibility to the public. In discussion of the case, Falle said, "I don't know anyone in the prostitution business who hasn’t ended up dead, in jail, or on drugs." She intended to bring a pimp stick to the Supreme Court of Canada in June 2013 as a visual aid in explaining how pimps often abuse the women they prostitute.

=== Advocacy events ===
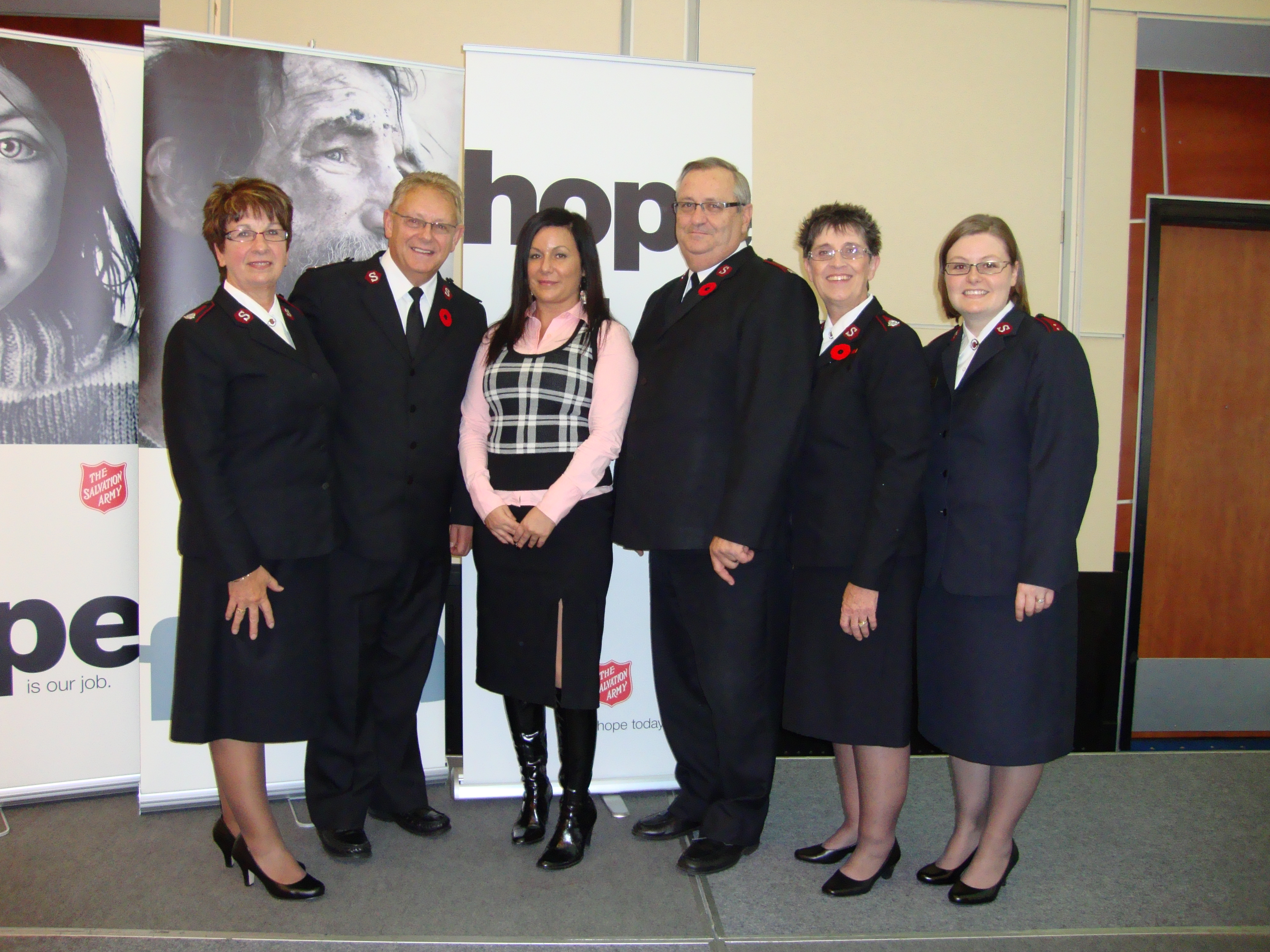
Natasha Falle has partnered with a variety of organizations opposing human trafficking, including The Salvation Army.

In October 2010, Falle picketed a courthouse in downtown Toronto in recognition of International Day of No Prostitution. She was joined by Trisha Baptie, Bridget Perrier, Katarina MacLeod, and Christine Barkhouse; all were former human trafficking victims and sex workers. At the protest, Falle said that "only 1% of prostitutes say they enjoy sex with johns and 97% say they want to get out."

In January 2011, Falle appeared at the Party for Freedom at York University in Toronto, which launched the Alliance Against Modern Slavery, a nonprofit organization seeking to combat human trafficking through partnerships, education, and research. Falle was joined by Glendene Grant, human trafficking victim Jessie Foster's mother; Kevin Bales, co-founder and president of Free the Slaves; Kate Todd, a singer-songwriter and actor; Janelle Belgrave of Samba Elégua Drummers and Peace Concept; Roger Cram of Hiram College; and Jeff Gunn, a guitarist. That September, Falle attended Toronto's second annual Freedom Walk, which was hosted by Stop Child Trafficking Now, Freedom Relay Canada, and Oakville's Free-Them. At this event aimed at raising awareness about human trafficking nationally and internationally, Falle was joined by other abolitionists including Tara Teng, who was Miss Canada at the time; Trisha Baptie, co-founder of EVE; Shae Invidiata, founder of Free-Them; Timea Nagy; Constable Lepa Jankovic; MP Joy Smith; MP Olivia Chow; and MP Terence Young.

In October 2012, Falle was the keynote speaker at a symposium on street prostitution and human trafficking, which took place at Croatian Hall in Greater Sudbury and was attended by approximately 100 people. Sergeant Corinne Fewster of the Greater Sudbury Police Service said that the manner in which Falle was aided in her transition out of prostitution is a good example for local social and health services to follow in helping other women exit the sex industry. The following month, Falle told her story at a lunch hosted by The Salvation Army in Vancouver. That year, Falle said, "Where there's high-track prostitutes, escorts, strippers and masseuses; there's pimp violence."

In March 2013, Falle spoke at the 57th Session of the United Nations Commission on the Status of Women, where she sat on a panel called "Survivors Speak: Prostitution and Sex Trafficking" that was sponsored by Coalition Against Trafficking in Women. That May, Falle spoke at a fundraiser for the Servants Anonymous Society of Calgary, an organization that supports sex workers in the city. It was her first time in Calgary since she had been part of the sex industry there. The fundraiser was called "Cry of the Streets: An Evening for Freedom" and raised money for Servants Anonymous Facilitates Exit, a women's shelter for those seeking to leave the sex industry. At the fundraiser, Falle advocated adopting a law in Canada analogous to Sweden's Sex Purchase Act, which decriminalized the selling of sex and criminalized pimping and the purchasing of sex. Falle argued in support of modelling prostitution law in Canada after Sweden's laws because she believes that prostitution cannot be regulated. At another time, she had said that "it's not Canada's laws that make prostitution unsafe, it's the johns who are raping and abusing the women and their pimps." Also in 2013, Falle said that the average age at which girls get involved in prostitution in Canada is 14, and that their emotional intelligence does not develop while in prostitution, preventing many of them from leaving. She also said that prostitution has grown significantly in Canada since she left the sex industry, and that most human trafficking victims in Canada were born and raised in Canada.

== See also ==
- List of kidnappings
