= Tímea Nagy (activist) =

Canadian activist

- Born: 1977 (age 48–49); Budapest, Hungary
- Citizenship: Canadian
- Occupations: Abolitionist; public speaker
- Organization: Walk with Me
- Known for: Opposing prostitution and human trafficking
- Website: walk-with-me.org

Tímea Nagy (born 1977) is a Canadian activist who has spoken on behalf of victims of human trafficking. She founded Walk with Me, a Toronto-based organization that aids survivors of trafficking. Nagy was featured in an anti-trafficking campaign by the Salvation Army in 2009. Her activism has drawn upon her own experience of forced prostitution in Canada.

== Capture and escape ==
Born in Hungary, Nagy was trafficked for prostitution in Canada in 1998. She escaped after three and a half months.

After her escape, Nagy began advocating on behalf of human trafficking victims. She said that she "started speaking out [because] it seemed like there was a huge need". In 2009, Nagy founded Walk With Me, a Toronto-based organization that gives aid to human trafficking survivors and partners with the Royal Canadian Mounted Police (RCMP) in rescuing victims, some of whom are only 12 years old. In reference to this work, Nagy said: "We do what we can... we pick them up, take them to a safe place, feed them, and try to help them." Nagy also began working at a Salvation Army women's shelter and travelling across Canada to raise awareness among police officers about human trafficking in Canada; the RCMP estimates that 1,400 women and children are trafficked into Canada each year, 600 of whom are trafficked for sexual purposes. Nagy said that she finds it difficult emotionally to speak about her experiences of sexual slavery, "but until the public hears it from a victim, it's not real".

== Aftermath and activism ==
In 2009, The Salvation Army featured Nagy's story in an anti-human-trafficking campaign, called, "The Truth Isn't Sexy"; the campaign sought to raise awareness about "people who are sold on the street, who don't have a choice". That September, Nagy spoke at a Calgary workshop that had been convened as part of a larger human trafficking seminar for immigration and police officials, a few days after the first time human trafficking charges were laid in Alberta; police alleged that two women from Fiji and one from Beijing had been tricked into sexual slavery in Canada through similar circumstances to those Nagy had experienced 11 years prior. At the workshop, Nagy said that, "It could happen to anyone... All you have to do is answer a stupid ad. Or go with a guy who tells you that he loves you. They'll take you to another city, and you have no way of coming back."

In June 2010, Nagy visited Edmonton to speak about human trafficking at a conference for police officers. The conference was held at Enoch Cree Nation's River Cree Resort, and was organized by the Alberta Law Enforcement Response Team. Also that month, the MP for Kildonan — St. Paul Joy Smith's private member's bill, Bill C-268, was passed as An Act to amend the Criminal Code (minimum sentence for offences involving trafficking of persons under the age of eighteen years). Nagy was one of the bill's five main proponents, the others being Natasha Falle, another former human trafficking victim who now runs the anti-human-trafficking organization Sex Trade 101; Tamara Cherry, a journalist for the Toronto Sun who writes about human trafficking in Canada; Brian McConaghy, a former RCMP officer who works with Ratanak International, another anti-human-trafficking organization; and Grand Chief of the Assembly of Manitoba Chiefs Ron Evans, who raised awareness about victims of the sex industry in Manitoba. That October, Nagy held workshops for police officers in Winnipeg.

In 2011, Nagy began operating a hotline for human trafficking victims. By 2013, she had spoken with more than 200 victims. In June 2011, Nagy spoke out against a decision that had been made to strike down some Canadian anti-prostitution laws; she argued that "this ruling will not make it any safer" for human trafficking victims, and that "it will not free them up from being enslaved". Nagy attended the hearing with a group of other former victims of prostitution who were opposing the striking down of the laws. One of these other women was Trisha Baptie. Alan Young, the lawyer seeking to strike down the laws, addressed these women by saying, "I'm sorry for what happened to you, but don't extrapolate from your experience into public policy." That September, Nagy attended Toronto's second annual Freedom Walk. At this event, aimed at raising awareness about human trafficking nationally and internationally, Nagy was joined by such other abolitionists as Natasha Falle, founder of Sex Trade 101; Trisha Baptie, co-founder of EVE; Shae Invidiata, founder of Free-Them; Tara Teng, who was Miss Canada at the time; Constable Lepa Jankovic; MP Joy Smith; MP Olivia Chow; and MP Terence Young.

== Results from activism ==
In March 2012, the Court of Appeal for Ontario struck down several anti-prostitution laws, and Nagy said that this decision would result in "police officers [having] way less power to arrest domestic traffickers". That July, Nagy praised two decisions that were made in Canada to combat human trafficking. The first of these decisions was one announced by Diane Finley, Minister of Human Resources and Skills Development, and Jason Kenney, Minister of Citizenship and Immigration. This decision was to prevent employers in the sex industry from hiring temporary foreign workers. The second decision was that of the Department of Citizenship and Immigration Canada to stop processing new applications for sex-industry-related businesses, such as escort agencies, massage parlors, and strip clubs. In response to these two decisions, Nagy said: "I think it's a really good start, [but] we just have to make sure other avenues are tightened as well, such as more strict monitoring of student visas and visitors visas." She said that some women are kept in strip clubs, without access to a phone or to their identification papers.

== Awards ==
In 2010 in Winnipeg, Nagy received an award at the first annual Honouring Heroes ceremony, which was organized by Joy Smith, who is also an anti-human-trafficking activist. Nagy responded to her award by saying, "I'm honoured to be honoured." Nagy was one of five award recipients at the ceremony, the other four being the other primary proponents of Bill C-268. At the ceremony, Nagy spoke about the erotic services advertised on Craigslist, and said that she was disgusted that the girls sold through the website were inaccessible by the police and anti-human-trafficking organizations.

== See also ==
- List of kidnappings (1990–1999)
- List of solved missing person cases (1990s)
