= Gunilla Ekberg =

Swedish-Canadian lawyer

Academic background
- Education: University of British Columbia, Canada

Academic work
- Main interests: Swedish Government's expert on prostitution and trafficking in human beings

Gunilla Ekberg is a Swedish-Canadian lawyer. From 2002 to 2006, she was employed at the Ministry of Industry as the Swedish Government's expert on prostitution and trafficking in human beings.

== Education ==
Ekberg's education includes a degree in social work from Lund University, and a law degree from the University of British Columbia in Canada. She took out Canadian citizenship in 2003.

== Career ==
Ekberg is a strong opponent of prostitution, and an outspoken advocate for Sweden's approach to prostitution, in which the sex buyers are prosecuted, but the prostitutes are supported by the social services in an effort to move them out of the industry. In 2005, the program The Gender War criticized Ekberg for telling the reporter Evin Rubar that she could not expect help if she was assaulted, since she opposed the feminist movement. This led to calls for her resignation, but Equality Minister (Jämställdhetsminister) Jens Orback defended her.

Ekberg later became Co-Executive Director to the lobby group Coalition Against Trafficking in Women International in Brussels, from which she continued to campaign against prostitution around the world, including Bulgaria, Australia, and Vancouver.

== Articles ==
- Ekberg, Gunilla S.; Parr, Joy (August 1996). "Mrs Consumer and Mr Keynes in post-war Canada and Sweden". Gender & History. 8 (2): 212–230. doi:10.1111/j.1468-0424.1996.tb00044.x. Pdf.
- Ekberg, Gunilla S. (February 2000). "Abortion rights are central". Off Our Backs. 30 (2): 18. JSTOR 20836554.
- Ekberg, Gunilla S. (October 2004). "The Swedish law that prohibits the purchase of a sexual service: Best practices for prevention of prostitution and trafficking in human beings". Violence Against Women. 10 (10): 1187–1218. doi:10.1177/1077801204268647. S2CID 73297880. Pdf.

== See also ==
- Prostitution in Sweden
- CATW
