= Coalition Against Trafficking in Women =

International non-governmental organization

- Founded: 1988
- Location: New York, NY
- Website: catwinternational.org

The Coalition Against Trafficking in Women (CATW) is an American radical feminist and gender-critical non-governmental organization opposing human trafficking, prostitution, and other forms of commercial sex. It is strongly opposed to the perspectives of the Global Alliance Against Traffic in Women and the sex workers rights movement.

== Views ==
CATW was set up in 1988 by feminists. The organisation is rooted in a radical feminist point of view. Its definition of "trafficking" includes all forms of prostitution of women or children. CATW opposes a distinction between "forced" and "voluntary" prostitution, as it sees all forms of prostitution as a violation of the dignity of women and violence against them. In this regard, it is strongly opposed to the perspectives of the Global Alliance Against Traffic in Women and the sex workers' rights movement. Aside from prostitution, CATW is opposed to "pornography, sex tourism, and mail-order bride selling". On its website, CATW categorizes sexual exploitation as including sexual harassment, rape, incest, and battery.

The coalition's proposed solution to the problem of human trafficking and sexual exploitation is to decriminalize the selling of sexual acts, while criminalizing the buying of sexual acts, pimping, brothel-keeping, and trafficking. This approach, sometimes referred to as the "Swedish Model" or "Nordic Model", has been implemented in Sweden, Norway, Iceland, France, Northern Ireland, Ireland, and Israel, partly as a result of lobbying by CATW-affiliated activists in those countries. CATW views these laws as successful in combating prostitution and human trafficking, and lobbies for the replication of such legislation elsewhere. However, the efficacy of the "Nordic Model" has been challenged by organizations such as Human Rights Watch, Amnesty International, UNAIDS and the World Health Organization, all of which instead "support the full decriminalization of sex work."

CATW has been described by its opponents as a "neo-abolitionist lobby group" that represents an ideologically charged "carceral feminist anti-trafficking practice that primarily criminalizes, censors, and oppresses the agency, behaviors, and needs of structurally marginalized communities" and that contributes to "essentializing women with racialized and marginalized identities in sex work, with no discursive recognition of intersectional structural inequalities."

CATW also claims to "reject state policies and practices that channel women into conditions of sexual exploitation", and to "provide education and employment opportunities that enhance women's worth and status".

Alison Murray accused CATW of racism, and of creating an "erotic pathetic stereotype of the Asian prostitute which creates the possibility for middle-class women’s trafficking hysteria."

CATW has collaborated with anti-trans groups, including Women's Declaration International (WDI). Its regional branch, the Coalition Against Trafficking in Women and Girls in Latin America and the Caribbean, is a signatory of the manifesto of Women's Declaration International. CATW's regional director in Latin America Teresa Ulloa has also appeared as a speaker at WDI events. Sheila Jeffreys has also linked her work with WDI to her work with CATW.

== History ==
CATW was founded 1988 as the outcome of a conference titled, "First Global Conference Against Trafficking in Women", organized by several American feminist groups, including Women Against Pornography and WHISPER. WHISPER (Women Hurt in Systems of Prostitution Engaged in Revolt) was a pioneering program founded in the 1980s by Sarah Wynters and other women who had survived prostitution. Later, WHISPER's mission to help women and girls escape prostitution and sexual exploitation was continued by Breaking Free, Inc. by Vednita Carter, who previously served as WHISPER's director of women's services. The leaders of CATW, such as founder Dorchen Leidholdt and co-chair (as of 2007) Norma Ramos, were originally leaders of Women Against Pornography.

CATW was the first international non-governmental organization (NGO) working against trafficking, and gained consultative status with ECOSOC (UN) in 1989. The CATW has influenced anti-sex exploitation industry and anti-trafficking legislation in places all over the world, including the Philippines, Venezuela, Bangladesh, Japan, Sweden, and the United States.

Its former executive director Gunilla Ekberg was featured in the documentary The Gender War, where she threatened journalist Evin Rubar.

== Involvement ==
In 2008, the Coalition supported the campaign to defeat San Francisco's Proposition K, which called for the full decriminalization of prostitution. CATW also encouraged its followers to get television network HBO to stop airing shows like Cathouse, which it claims promote sex trafficking and prostitution. In 2008, CATW held a discussion at the New York City Bar Association on the laws in Sweden and the US governing prostitution and human trafficking, entitled, "Abolishing Sex Slavery: From Stockholm to Hunts Point".

== Structure ==
The organization consists of regional networks and affiliated groups. It is an umbrella organization that is directed by the regional networks. The organization has what it describes as "national coalitions" in countries including the Philippines, Bangladesh, Indonesia, Thailand, Venezuela, Puerto Rico, Chile, Canada, Norway, France, Spain, and Greece.

After the "Conference on Women Empowering Women: A Human Rights Conference on Trafficking in Asian Women" held in Manila, Philippines, in April 1993, CATW created an Asia Pacific chapter. The Australian branch of CATW is also part of the Asia Pacific chapter. The Australian branch is for women only. Other branches can be found in Africa, Europe, Norway, Northern Norway, Latin America, and the Caribbean islands. Branches have regional directors, such as Teresa Ulloa Ziáurriz, who served as director of Latin America and the Caribbean until her death in 2025.

== Tactics ==
CATW is an organization subscribing to a "low-risk activism", meaning it claims to use tactics that typically do not disrupt the public or otherwise lead to disobedience. It tends to pursue objectives by fundraising, in order to provide safe houses for victims and to purchase other resources. It schedules and attends meetings with the targets of their lobbying efforts (mainly countries which it regards as having lax or no human trafficking laws) and politicians, to submit resolutions and enact legislation against sexual exploitation and other forms of human trafficking. It also publicizes its efforts via its website, and various human rights and anti-human trafficking organizations.

CATW lobbies students and communities all over the globe. It stages "training" sessions for educators, law enforcement and government officials, and community leaders, and testifies before national congresses, parliaments, law reform commissions, and regional and United Nations committees.

== Campaigns, programs, and projects ==
The following is a list and brief description of some of CATW's global campaigns:

- Measures to Combat Trafficking in Human Beings – addresses perceived gaps in current anti-trafficking programs and policies, with a focus on gender equality, demand, and the links between prostitution and trafficking (some participating countries include Albania, Bulgaria, Croatia, Czech Republic)
- The Prevention Project – multi-tiered project to prevent sex trafficking and sexual exploitation by developing standard practices (some participating countries include Italy, Nigeria, Mali, Mexico, and the Republic of Georgia)
- Project to Curb Male Demand for Prostitution (some participating countries include the Baltic Countries, India, and the Philippines)
- Human Rights Documentation Project – conducts training sessions that instruct women's organizations in what the organization describes as "feminist research methods"

== See also ==
- Human trafficking
- International Day of No Prostitution
- Prostitution
