= List of ambassadors of Sweden to Slovakia =

Ambassador of Sweden to Slovakia
- Lesser coat of arms of the Kingdom of Sweden
- Incumbent; Annika Ben David since August 2025
- Ministry for Foreign Affairs; Swedish Embassy, Vienna
- Style: His or Her Excellency (formal); Mr. or Madam Ambassador (informal)
- Reports to: Minister for Foreign Affairs
- Residence: Palais Szeps, Liechtensteinstraße 51 (Note: Sweden's ambassador to Slovakia is based in Vienna, Austria, where the residence and chancery share the same location.)
- Seat: Vienna, Austria (Note: The Swedish ambassador in Vienna is also accredited in Bratislava.)
- Appointer: Government of Sweden
- Term length: No fixed term
- Precursor: Ambassador of Sweden to Czechoslovakia
- Formation: 1993
- First holder: Lennart Watz

The Ambassador of Sweden to Slovakia (known formally as the Ambassador of the Kingdom of Sweden to the Slovak Republic) is the official representative of the government of Sweden to the president of Slovakia and government of Slovakia. Since Sweden does not have an embassy in Bratislava, Sweden's ambassador in Vienna, Austria, is also accredited to Bratislava.

== History ==
On 1 January 1993, Sweden recognized the two new states of the Czech Republic and Slovakia. Diplomatic relations with the governments in Prague and Bratislava had now been established. The Swedish embassy in Prague in the former Czechoslovakia became an embassy in the newly created Czech Republic and the Swedish ambassador to Czechoslovakia became ambassador to the Czech Republic. Lennart Watz was appointed ambassador in Prague with a dual accreditation in Bratislava, the capital of Slovakia.

On 10 April 2003, the Swedish government decided that Sweden would open an embassy in Bratislava at the beginning of 2004. Cecilia Julin was accredited as Sweden's first resident ambassador in Bratislava in October 2003. The Swedish embassy was inaugurated by Prime Minister Göran Persson in May 2004. However, the embassy was closed only six years later, in 2010.

Since 2011, Sweden's ambassador in Vienna, Austria, has also been accredited to Bratislava.

== List of representatives ==
Name	Period	Title	Notes	Ref
Lennart Watz	1993–1996	Ambassador	Resident in Prague	
Ingmar Karlsson	1996–2001	Ambassador	Resident in Prague.	
Harald Fälth	2001–2003	Ambassador	Resident in Prague.	
Cecilia Julin	2003–2006	Ambassador		
Mikael Westerlind	September 2006 – 2010	Ambassador		
Nils Daag	2011–2015	Ambassador	Resident in Vienna.	
Helen Eduards	2015–2018	Ambassador	Resident in Vienna.	
Mikaela Kumlin Granit	September 2018 – 2021	Ambassador	Resident in Vienna.	
Annika Markovic	2021–2025	Ambassador	Resident in Vienna.	
Annika Ben David	August 2025 – present	Ambassador	Resident in Vienna.	
