= Eva Lundgren =

Norwegian-Swedish sociologist (born 1947)

- Born: 24 November 1947 (age 78); Flekkefjord, Norway
- Education: University of Bergen
- Known for: Process of normalization theory
- Scientific career
- Fields: Theology, sociology, women's studies
- Workplaces: Uppsala University (1989–2011), New York University (1996–1997)

Eva Lundgren (born November 24, 1947) is a Norwegian-Swedish sociologist. She is an expert on violence against women and sexual violence, particularly in religious contexts. She is professor emerita of sociology at Uppsala University.

Lundgren is best known for developing the theory of the process of normalization of violence, according to which, abused women gradually adopt the perspective of their abusers. Lundgren has written several books on violence, sexuality and religion. She held a government-appointed chair of sociology at Uppsala University 1993–2011, to study "the relation between power and gender in family and society, particularly in regard to men's violence against women", and has been a visiting professor at several universities, including New York University. Since 2017 she has been active in the Me Too debate.

== Career ==
A native of Flekkefjord, she started her career as a model and studied at the University of Bergen, where she earned her (6-year) Candidate's degree in theology in 1978 and her doctoral degree in 1985. She was first employed as a Research Fellow at the University of Bergen, and was appointed an associate professor in 1986. She was head of the Department of Gender Studies at the University of Bergen 1987–1988, and was found to be competent as a full professor in 1988. In 1989, she was appointed a Docent (Reader) in Theology at Uppsala University, relocating to Stockholm.

In 1993, she was appointed Professor of Sociology at Uppsala University by the government of Sweden, to study the "relation between power and gender in family and society, in particular men's violence against women". She was installed as a professor with a military parade and gave her inaugural lecture on eroticised power in Uppsala Cathedral. She was a visiting professor at New York University from 1996 to 1997, and has also held visiting professorships at the University of North London, the University of Bradford and Åbo Akademi University. In 2003, Lundgren became head of department for the newly created Department of Gender Studies (Samgenus) at Uppsala University.

== Work ==
=== Normalisation process ===
Theoretically, Lundgren has focused on developing the concept of the process of normalisation, a model to explain how battered women gradually break down and accept the violent situation. Lundgren has also argued that men who systematically use sexualised violence against their partner do so in order to consolidate their position of power, rather than to satisfy a sexual desire.

=== Knutby murder ===
In recent years, Lundgren's research has focused on the Knutby murder. Her 2008 book The Knutby Code, published simultaneously in Swedish and Norwegian, is a critical analysis of the Knutby case.

== Reception ==
=== Political influence ===
Lundgren's research has had considerable influence on public policy in Sweden, particularly under the social democratic governments in the 1990s and early 2000s. One of her supporters is Margareta Winberg, the former deputy PM and Minister for Gender Equality, who once described Lundgren as "cool". The 1998 Violence Against Women Act (Kvinnofridslagen) is said to be based on Lundgren's research.

=== 2005 controversy in the wake of "The Gender War" ===
A controversial TV documentary on radical feminism in Sweden titled The Gender War, which was aired in 2005, generated debate on Eva Lundgren's work in both Sweden and Norway. This led Uppsala University's rector Bo Sundqvist to first announce a public debate on Lundgren's research, then cancel the debate and appoint a commission consisting of political scientist Jörgen Hermansson and philosopher Margareta Hallberg to investigate Lundgren's research. The inquiry cleared her of any wrongdoing, although Hallberg and Hermansson aimed criticism at her conclusions. However, the inquiry and the report were criticized by Uppsala University's chief lawyer Marianne Andersson, who stated that Hallberg and Hermansson's criticism of Lundgren's conclusions was inappropriate and illegal in the context of such a report, and not in their mandate, which was solely to investigate claims of wrongdoing. Lundgren dismissed the criticism. 14 leading researchers in Lundgren's field of study also criticized the "unique" inquiry, stating that Hermansson and Hallberg were not competent to assess Lundgren's research. The university committed itself to restoring Lundgren's reputation, granting her and her research group increased funding in compensation for having subjected her to an unjustified inquiry.

== 2011 resignation ==
In 2011, Eva Lundgren resigned from her chair at Uppsala University, stating that she will concentrate on her international career in the future, and criticizing Uppsala University for not doing enough to support her. She had previously criticized the university for not honouring the agreement to restore her reputation. Lundgren is writing a book on what she considers an attack on feminist scholarship in Sweden.

== Lundgren in the Me Too debate ==
In the context of the Me Too debate in 2017, the Swedish newspaper Svenska Dagbladet wrote that Lundgren had been proven right and that the criticism of her in the early 2000s had been discredited. In 2018, also in the context of the Me Too debate, Lundgren and legal scholar Jenny Westerstrand wrote that the Swedish journalistic profession bore a large part of the blame in Sweden for the problems the debate had highlighted because Swedish journalists had systematically attacked critical discussion of and research on men's violence against women for over 20 years.

In 2019 the National Organisation for Women's Shelters and Young Women's Shelters in Sweden described the criticism of Lundgren in 2005 as a hate speech campaign orchestrated by trolls and incels, which they linked to a broader assault on gender studies by right-wing populists; the organisation lauded Lungren's "enormous influence in Swedish feminism, the women's shelter movement, academia and politics."

== Selected publications (in Norwegian or Swedish) ==
- 2018: Livsarven. Gyldendal Norsk Forlag. ISBN 9788205512917.
- 2008: Knutby-koden. Oslo/Stockholm. ISBN 978-82-05-38472-9.
- 2001: Ekte kvinne? Identitet på kryss og tvers. Oslo.
- 2001: Slagen dam. Mäns våld mot kvinnor i jämställda Sverige. Stockholm.
- 1994: La de små barn komme til meg. Barns erfaringer med seksuelle og rituelle overgrep. Oslo.
- 1993: Det får da være grenser for kjønn. Voldelig empiri og feministisk teori. Oslo. (English: There Must Be Some Limits to Gender: Violent Empiricism and Feminist Theory)
- 1992: Gud och alla andra karlar. Om kvinnomisshandlare. Stockholm.
- 1990: Gud og hver mann. Seksualisert vold som kulturell arena for å skape kjönn. Oslo.
- 1987: Prester i lyst og last. Om kjönn, makt og erotikk i Den norske kirkes sjelesorg. Oslo.
- 1985: I Herrens vold. Dokumentasjon av vold mot kvinner i kristne miljöer. Oslo.
- 1985: På tvers. Trekk fra avvikets historie. Doctoral thesis (Doktorsavhandling), Bergen.
- 1984: Den Herren elsker, tukter han. Tre rapporter om overgrep mot kvinner. Bergen.
- 1982: Den bortkomne datter. Kvinneteologi, kvinnefrigjöring, teologikritikk. Oslo.
- 1981: Djevleutdriverne. Eksorsisme i Norge. Oslo.

== See also ==
- Södertälje case
- Duluth model

== Literature ==
- Eldén, Åsa and Westerstrand, Jenny (eds.), Guts and Glory: Festskrift till Eva Lundgren. Uppsala University, 2007.

Academic offices
Preceded by First holder of chair	Professor of Sociology at Uppsala University; Government-appointed chair to study "the relation between power and gender in family and society, in particular men's violence against women" 1993–2011	Succeeded by
