= List of ambassadors of Sweden to Brazil =

Ambassador of Sweden to Brazil
- Lesser coat of arms of the Kingdom of Sweden

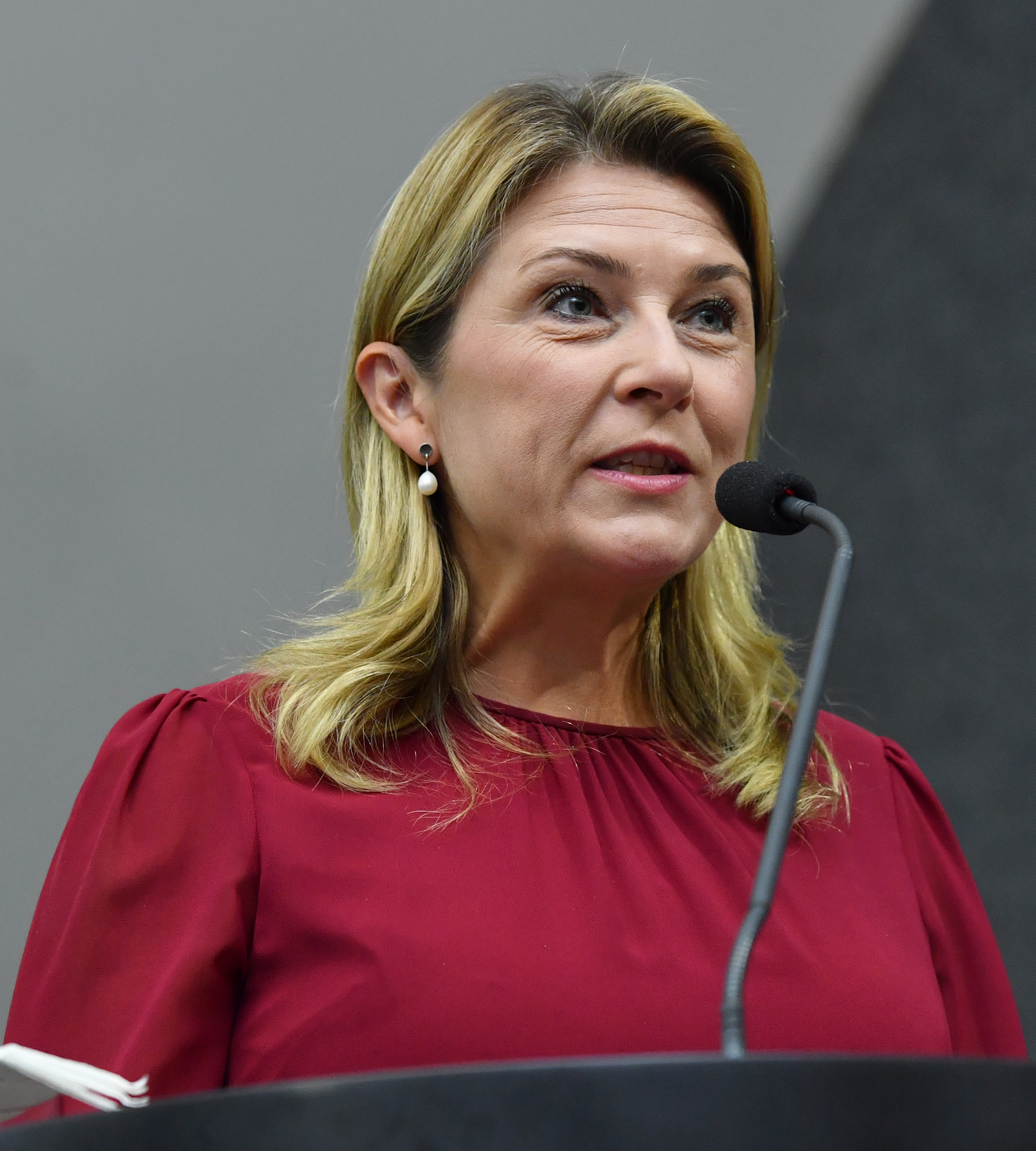
- Incumbent; Karin Wallensteen since August 2022
- Ministry for Foreign Affairs; Swedish Embassy, Brasília
- Style: His or Her Excellency (formal); Mr. or Madam Ambassador (informal)
- Reports to: Minister for Foreign Affairs
- Residence: Avenida das Nações Qd. 807, Lote 29 (Note: The ambassador's residence is located at the same place as the chancery.)
- Seat: Brasília, Brazil
- Appointer: Government of Sweden
- Term length: No fixed term
- Formation: 1808
- First holder: Johan Albert Kantzow
- Website: Swedish Embassy, Brasília

The Ambassador of Sweden to Brazil (known formally as the Ambassador of the Kingdom of Sweden to the Federative Republic of Brazil) is the official representative of the government of Sweden to the president of Brazil and federal government of Brazil.

== History ==
A Swedish consulate (trade agency) was established in Rio de Janeiro on 24 May 1808. Johan Albert Kantzow was appointed Sweden's first chargé d'affaires and general trading agent in Rio de Janeiro on 12 August 1808. The consulate was restructured into a consulate general on 25 May 1850. The consul general had previously, in the capacity of chargé d'affaires, also held a diplomatic assignment, which ended by decision on 23 September 1864.

In May 1918, the King in Council appointed and designated the chargé d'affaires and consul general in Rio de Janeiro, Johan Paues, as resident minister to Brazil. He was appointed Sweden's first envoy to Brazil in 1921.

In April 1956, an agreement was reached between the Swedish and Brazilian governments on the mutual elevation of the respective countries' legations to embassies. The diplomatic rank was thereafter changed to ambassador instead of envoy extraordinary and minister plenipotentiary. In June of the same year, Jan Stenström presented his credentials to the Brazilian Foreign Minister José Carlos de Macedo Soares.

== List of representatives ==
Name	Period	Title	Resident / Concurrent accreditation	Notes	Presented credentials	Ref
United Kingdom of Portugal, Brazil and the Algarves (1815–1825)
Johan Albert Kantzow	12 August 1808 – 1811	Chargé d'affaires		Also general trading agent		
Empire of Brazil (1822–1889)
Lorentz Westin	1825–1827	Chargé d'affaires ad interim				
Lorentz Westin	1827–1830	Chargé d'affaires		Also consul general		
David Gustaf Anckarloo	26 January 1830 – 1831	Chargé d'affaires				
Lars Gustaf Morsing	1845–1860	Chargé d'affaires		Acting consul general in 1844 and consul general from 1845. Died in office		
Gunnar Olof Hyltén-Cavallius	31 December 1860 – 23 September 1864	Chargé d'affaires		Swedish-Norwegian consul general in Rio de Janeiro 5 January 1861, on leave 18 February 1862.		
Erik Cederstråhle	7 November 1879 – 7 March 1886	Chargé d'affaires		Also consul general. Died in office.		
Republic of the United States of Brazil (1889–1967)
Johan Paues	1913–1918	Chargé d'affaires		Also consul general		
Johan Paues	1918–1920	Resident minister				
Gylfe Anderberg	1919–1920	Chargé d'affaires		Also acting consul general. (Note: Anderberg served as acting consul general and chargé d'affaires until Johan Paues returned from his 6 month vacation which started at the end of May 1919.)		
Johan Paues	1921 – 1 January 1936	Envoy		Acting 1920–21		
Axel Paulin	1923–1924	Chargé d'affaires				
Axel Paulin	1926–1926	Chargé d'affaires				
Gustaf Weidel	1 January 1936 – 1943	Envoy				
Ragnar Kumlin	1944–1948	Envoy				
Knut Richard Thyberg	1948–1955	Envoy				
Jan Stenström	1955 – June 1956	Envoy				
Jan Stenström	June 1956 – 1960	Ambassador			June 1956 (Note: To the foreign minister, not the president.)	
Sven Fredrik Hedin	January 1960 – April 1960	Chargé d'affaires ad interim				
Carl Douglas	April 1960 – 21 January 1961	Ambassador		Died in office		
Sven Fredrik Hedin	January 1961 – April 1961	Chargé d'affaires ad interim				
Jens Malling	April 1961 – July 1961	Chargé d'affaires en pied				
Jens Malling	July 1961 – 1965	Ambassador				
Gustaf Bonde	1966–1970	Ambassador				
Federative Republic of Brazil (1967–present)
Bengt Odevall	1970–1975	Ambassador				
Gunnar Lonaeus	1975–1978	Ambassador				
Lennart Rydfors	1978–1986	Ambassador	Also accredited to Asunción (from 1981)			
Krister Kumlin	1986–1990	Ambassador				
Gunnar Hultner	1990–1996	Ambassador				
Christer Manhusen	1996–2001	Ambassador				
Staffan Åberg	2001–2003	Ambassador				
Margareta Winberg	2003–2007	Ambassador	Also accredited to Paramaribo (from 2004)	Political appointee (non-career diplomat)		
Annika Markovic	2008–2011	Ambassador	Also accredited to Paramaribo			
Magnus Robach	September 2011 – 2014	Ambassador				
Per-Arne Hjelmborn	2014–2019	Ambassador				
Johanna Brismar Skoog	1 September 2019 – 2022	Ambassador			3 October 2019	
Karin Wallensteen	August 2022 – present	Ambassador			29 August 2022	

== Gallery ==
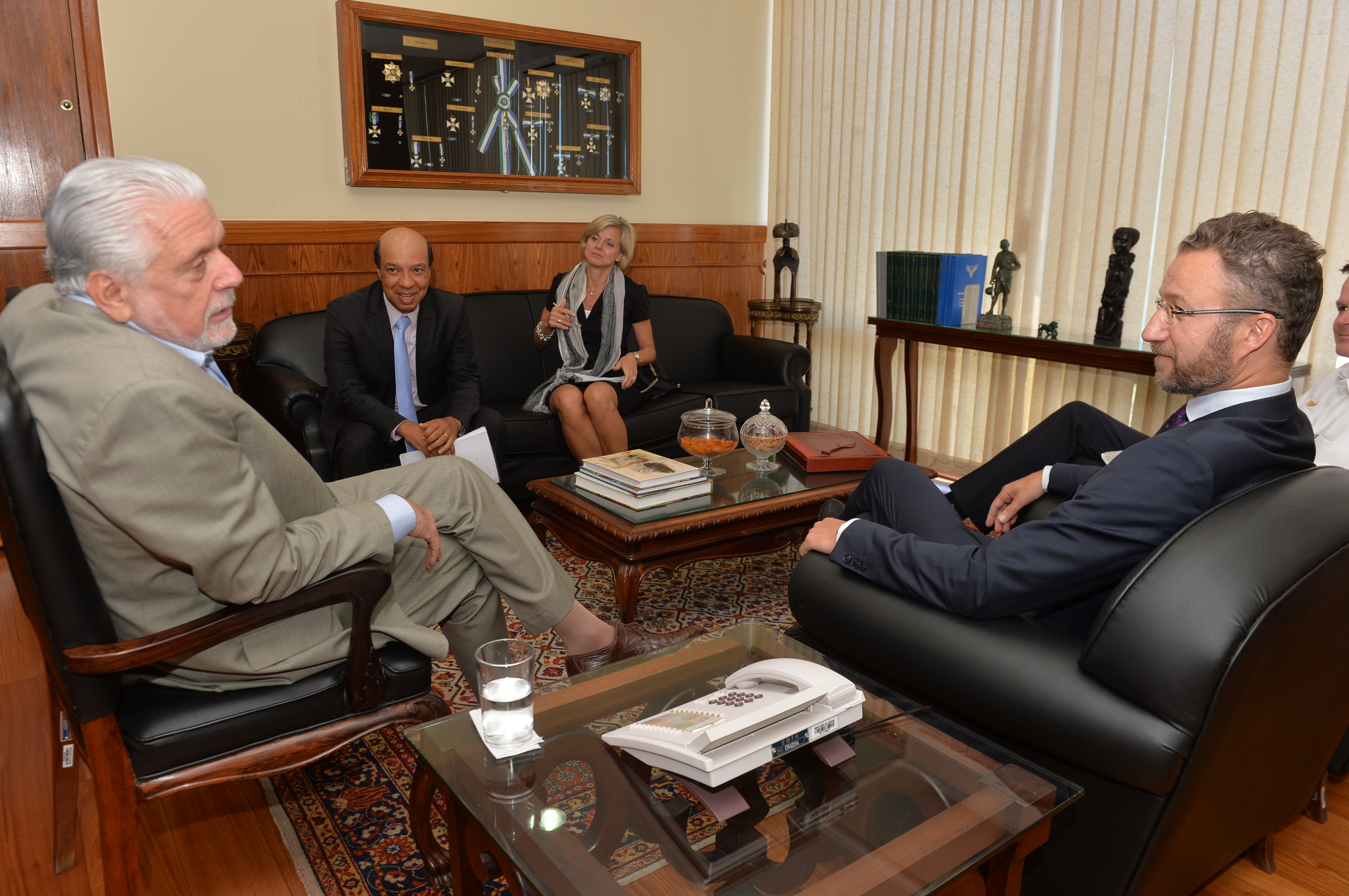
Ambassador Per-Arne Hjelmborn (2014–2019) and Minister of Defence Jaques Wagner

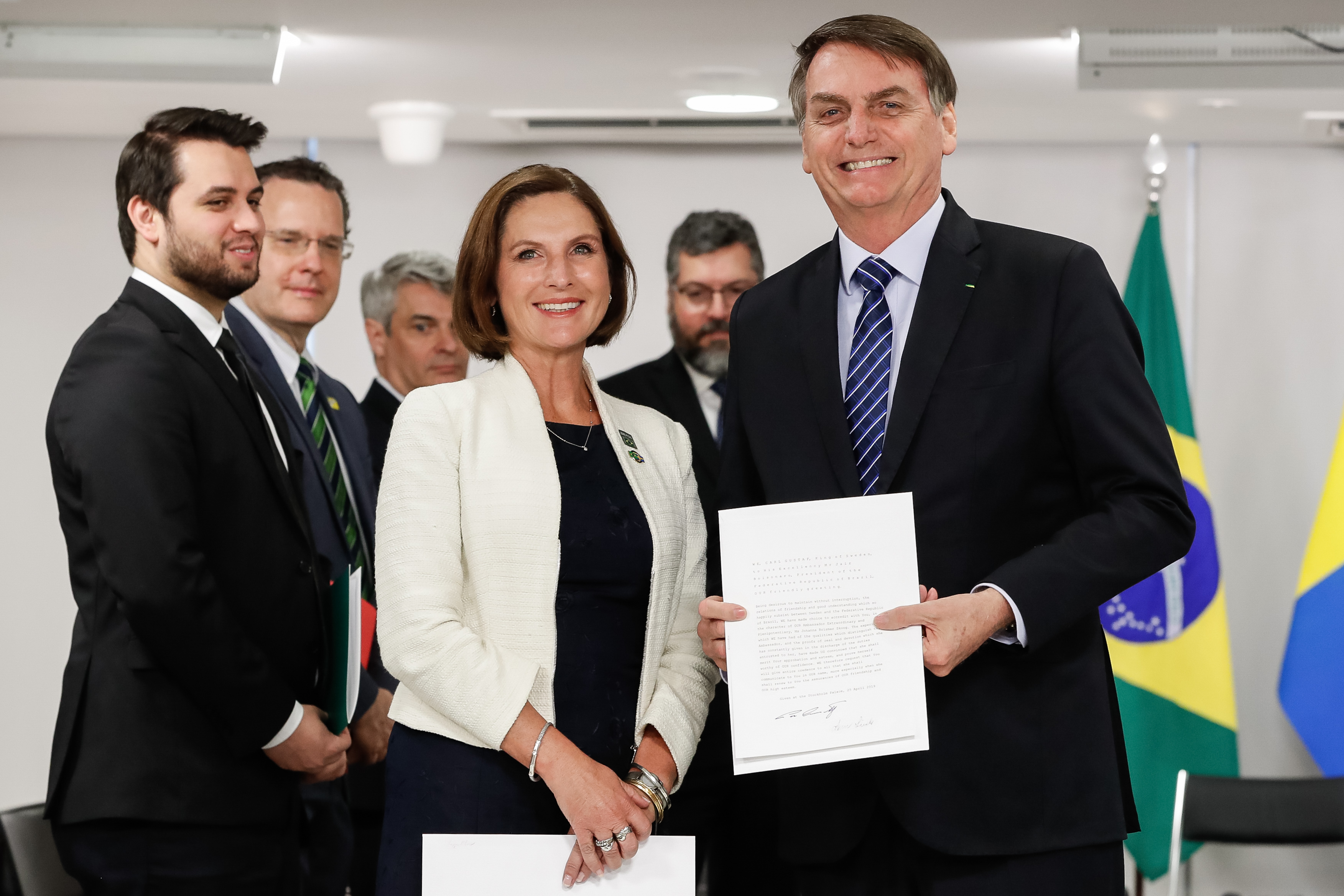
Ambassador Johanna Brismar Skoog (2019–2022) and President Jair Bolsonaro.

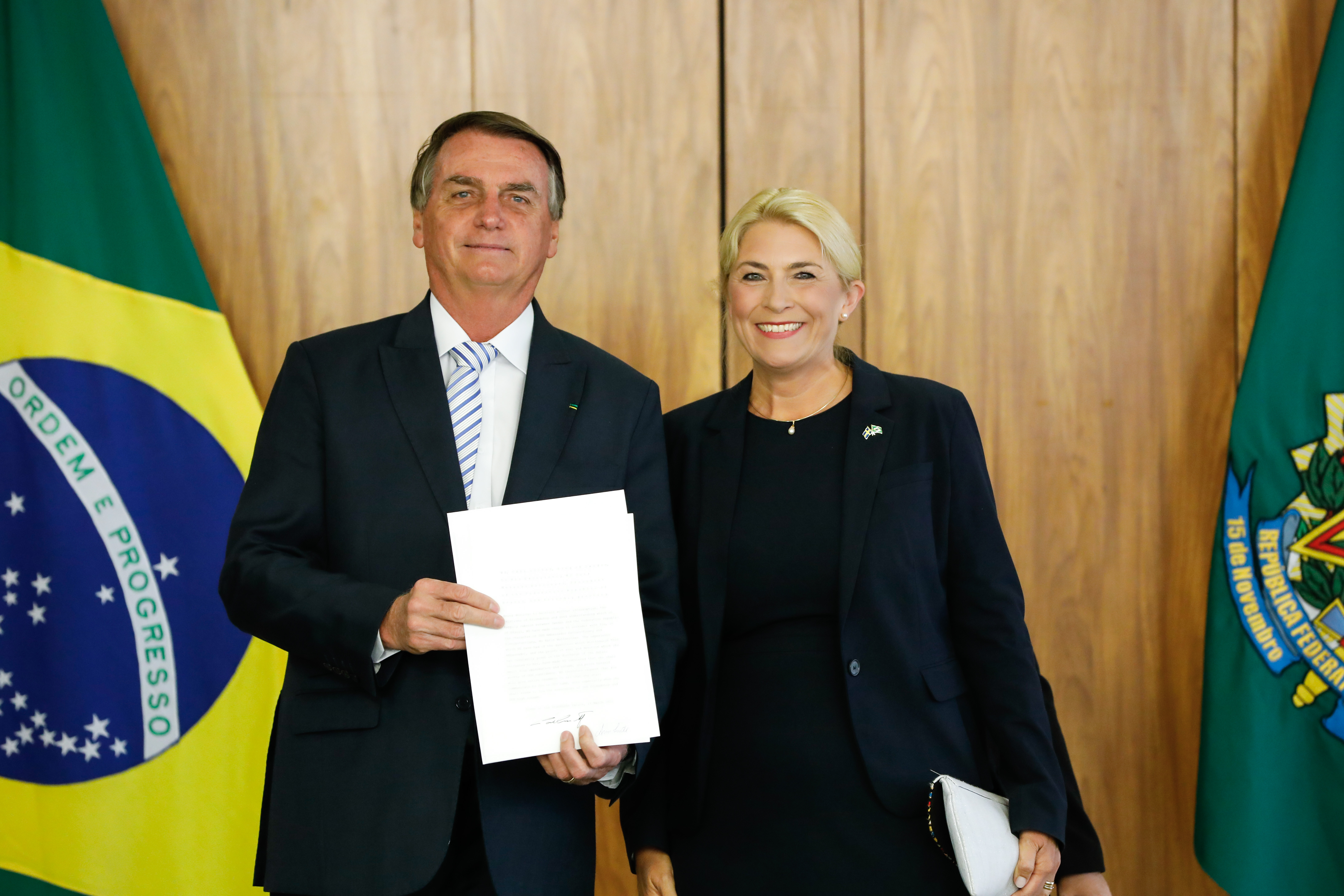
Ambassador Karin Wallensteen (2022–present) and President Jair Bolsonaro.

== See also ==
- Brazil–Sweden relations
