= Mikaela Kumlin Granit =

Swedish diplomat (born 1967)

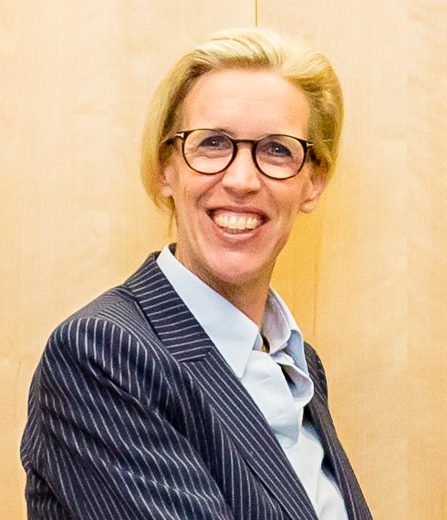
- Granit in 2018

Permanent Representative of Sweden to the European Union
- Incumbent
- Assumed office 2023

Ambassador of the United Kingdom
- In office 2021–2023
- Preceded by: Torbjörn Sohlström
- Succeeded by: Stefan Gullgren

Personal details
- Born: Mikaela Ruth Gunilla Kumlin Granit; 1 November 1967 (age 58)
- Parent: Krister Kumlin (father)
- Education: Stockholm University

Mikaela Ruth Gunilla Kumlin Granit (born 1 November 1967) is a Swedish diplomat who has been the Permanent Representative of Sweden to the European Union since 2023.

== Education ==
In 1993, she earned a BSC in Economics from Stockholm University.

== Career ==
From 2019 to 2020 she was Chairperson of the Board of Governors of the International Atomic Energy Agency, and was Sweden's Resident Representative to the Agency and the Permanent Representative to the United Nations and other international organizations in Vienna, as well as Ambassador to Austria, Slovakia and Slovenia.

Diplomatic posts
Preceded by Helen Eduards	Ambassador of Sweden to Austria; 2018–2021	Succeeded by Annika Markovic
Preceded by Helen Eduards	Ambassador of Sweden to Slovakia; 2018–2021	Succeeded by Annika Markovic
Preceded by Helen Eduards	Ambassador of Sweden to Slovenia; 2018–2020	Succeeded by Dag Hartelius
Preceded by Torbjörn Sohlström	Ambassador of Sweden to the United Kingdom; 2021–2023	Succeeded by Stefan Gullgren
Preceded by Lars Danielsson	Permanent Representative of Sweden to the European Union; 2023–present	Succeeded by Incumbent
