= Servants Anonymous Society =

Nonprofit women's organization

- Abbreviation: SAS
- Type: NGO
- Purpose: To aid young women in exiting the sex industry, achieve sobriety, and avoid sexual slavery
- Location: Canada
- Official language: English
- Affiliations: Sex Trade 101
- Website: www.servantsanon.com

The Servants Anonymous Society (SAS) is a Canadian nonprofit women's organization that provides aid to young women in exiting the sex industry, achieving sobriety, and avoiding sexual slavery. SAS offers life skills-based education to these women and safe houses for them to live in. One of the skills taught by SAS is how to prepare a budget. SAS partners with Sex Trade 101. In 2008 and 2009, there were book sales in Calgary, Alberta in support of SAS and Canwest Raise-a-Reader. In July 2011, paramedic Will Rogers performed a 1,000 km long-distance run to raise funds for the Surrey, British Columbia chapter of SAS. That December, the Surrey chapter received a $20,000 award at the Awards for Excellence ceremony hosted by the William H. Donner Foundation. In 2013, there was a fundraiser called "Cry of the Streets: An Evening for Freedom" that raised money for Servants Anonymous Facilitates Exit, a SAS women's shelter for those seeking to leave the sex industry.
