= Teresa Ulloa Ziáurriz =

Mexican human rights activist (1949–2025)

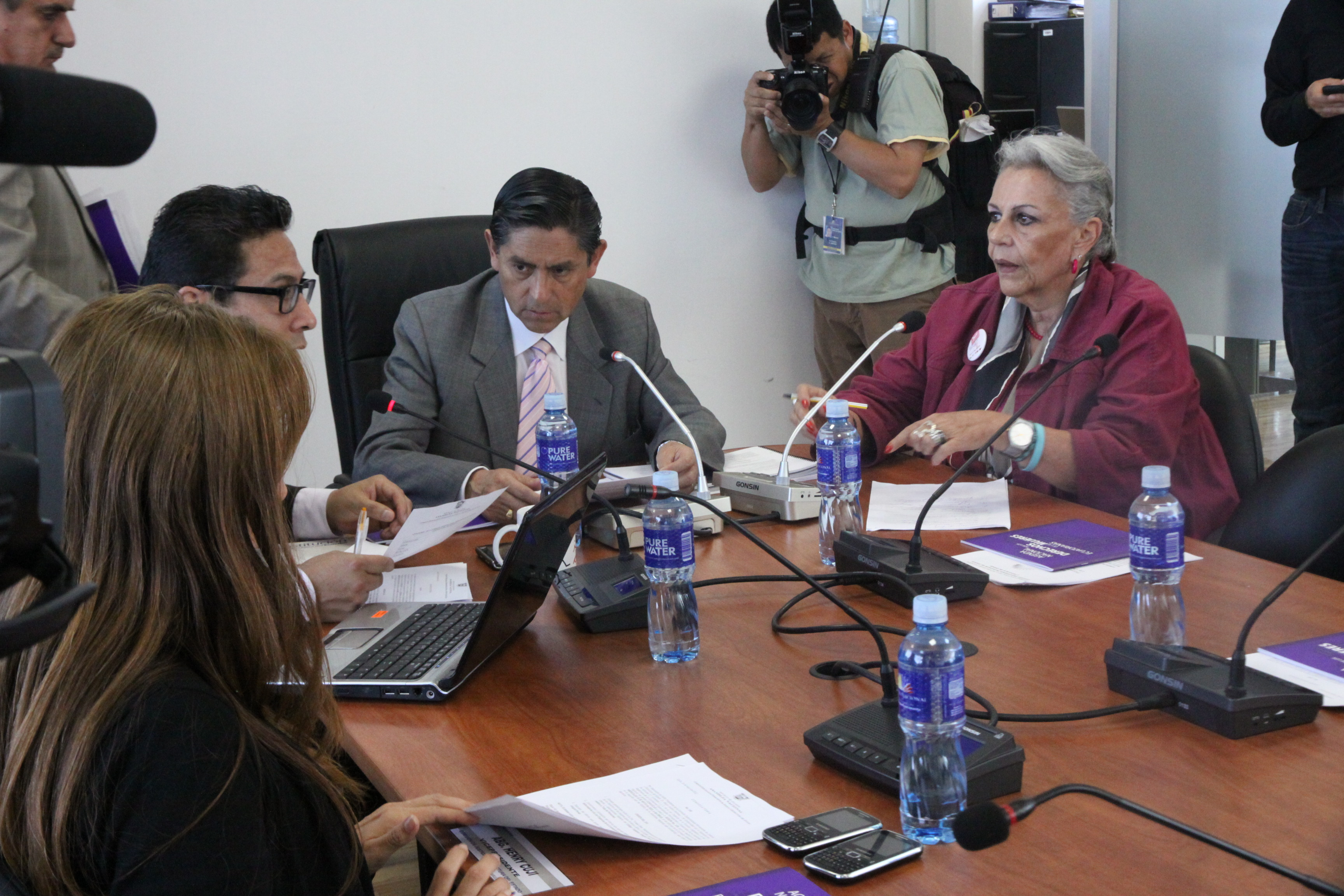
- Ulloa (right) in 2012
- Born: 31 December 1949; Mexico City, Mexico
- Died: 28 September 2025 (aged 75); Mexico City, Mexico
- Education: Instituto Nacional de Pedagogía; National Autonomous University of Mexico
- Occupations: Human rights activist Lawyer
- Years active: 1984–2025
- Organization: Coalition Against Trafficking in Women
- Partner: Leopoldo Colín (died 2023)
- Children: 1

Teresa Columba Ulloa Ziáurriz (31 December 1949 – 28 September 2025) was a Mexican human rights activist. She was known for her support of female victims of sex trafficking in Mexico, including rescuing women from trafficking rings and representing them in court. Ulloa was the regional director for Latin America and the Caribbean for the Coalition Against Trafficking in Women.

== Early life ==
Ulloa was born on 31 December 1949 in Mexico City, the oldest child of Armando Ulloa, an insurance salesman, and his wife, Graciela Ziáurriz Hernández. She attended the Colegio Francés Mayorazgo and the Panamerican Workshop before graduating with a bachelor's degree in education and human relations from the Instituto Nacional de Pedagogía in 1973. As a student, she was impacted by the Mexican Movement of 1968. In 1984, Ulloa received a degree in law from the National Autonomous University of Mexico.

Ulloa was married to Leopoldo Colín, with whom she had a daughter, Graciela. Colín died in 2023.

== Activism ==
Ulloa trained as a lawyer, though never formally obtained a licence; in the early 1980s, she began working as a legal advisor for unions. In this role, she was assigned to support two children aged 12 and three who had been gang raped, which led to her becoming involved in activism against sexual violence, establishing the women's legal collective Compañera in 1984 after obtaining her law degree. Beginning in the 1980s, Ulloa worked with state and federal governments to draft laws that increased punishments for rape and closed legal loopholes in existing legislation. This notably included a 2007 law protecting women from violence and a 2012 law increasing penalties for trafficking. She legally represented women and girls in over 25, 000 rape cases as of 2011.

In 2014, Ulloa gained some press attention due to her public role supporting victims of Cuauhtémoc Gutiérrez de la Torre, the former president of the Institutional Revolutionary Party, who had been accused of running a prostitution ring using money from the party. Ulloa provided counselling to the victims. Human rights activist Lucía Lagunes Huerta later said that Ulloa played a key role in exposing corruption within the Institutional Revolutionary Party. During the campaign she received smears from Gutiérrez de la Torre's supporters.

In 1994, Ulloa founded Defensoras Populares A.C., an organisation that advocated for women's rights, which advocated for the legal and social defence of victims. It organised at least 20 rescue operations, leading to the rescue of over 650 women and girls from trafficking rings as of 2011. At times, Ulloa would enter brothels disguised as a nun or a sex worker in order to speak to trafficked women, collating information and evidence to share with the police. Ulloa had received threats over the phone for her activism, including from drug cartels who controlled many of the trafficking rings. Ulloa went on to serve as the executive director for Latin America and the Caribbean of the Coalition Against Trafficking in Women.

Ulloa described the bodies of women being reduced to "commodities [and] objects [and] war trophies" due to "violence, sexism, patriarchy and phallocentric syndrome". She did not believe that prostitution could be a choice, describing the view that it could "patriarchal". Ulloa described her approach towards sexual violence as "holistic", including promoting educational efforts aimed at young men.

== Death ==
Ulloa died on 28 September 2025 in Mexico City of lung disease at the age of 75. She was survived by her daughter, Graciela, and her sister, also named Graciela.

Dorchen Leidholdt, one of the founders of the Coalition Against Trafficking in Women, released a statement saying that Ulloa's contributions to the movement to end sex trafficking were "too numerous to be recounted".

== Recognition ==
In 2011, Harvard University's Kennedy School of Government awarded Ulloa the Gleitsman International Activist Award.
