= Annika Åhnberg =

Swedish politician (1949–2025)

Minister for Agriculture, Food and Fisheries
- In office 1996–1998
- Prime Minister: Göran Persson
- Preceded by: Margareta Winberg
- Succeeded by: Margareta Winberg

Member of the Riksdag
- In office 1988–1994

Personal details
- Born: 7 November 1949 Sweden
- Died: 18 June 2025 (aged 75)
- Party: Left Party (until 1992); Social Democrats

Karin Annika Åhnberg (née Brandt, 7 November 1949 – 18 June 2025) was a Swedish politician of the Social Democratic Party and formerly of the Left Party.

Åhnberg resigned from the Left Party in 1992 due to the party's resistance to Swedish membership in the European Union. She served as minister for agriculture, food and fisheries in 1996–1998, in the Persson Cabinet.

Åhnberg died on 18 June 2025, at the age of 75.
