= Free the Slaves =

Non-governmental organization

- Abbreviation: FTS
- Formation: 2000
- Type: NGO
- Purpose: Combat human trafficking and slavery
- Headquarters: Washington, D.C.
- Location: United States
- Main organ: Board of Directors
- Website: www.freetheslaves.net

Free the Slaves (FTS) is an international non-governmental organization and lobby group, established to campaign against the modern practice of slavery around the world. It was formed as the sister organization of Anti-Slavery International but has since become a separate entity and has no relationship with it. The organization was created as a result of research done by Kevin Bales in his book, Disposable People: New Slavery in the Global Economy.

== Programs ==
Free the Slaves currently operates in India, Nepal, Ghana, the Democratic Republic of the Congo, Haiti, Senegal, the Dominican Republic, and Brazil. The countries are targeted based on the prevalence of slavery. The organization gives "Freedom Awards" to honor people and organizations fighting to end slavery. Winners have included Veeru Kohli (2009) and Timea Nagy, 2012.

== Supporters ==
Free the Slaves has worked with musicians such as Jason Mraz and Grammy Award winner Esperanza Spalding. Spalding performed a benefit concert for FTS in December 2012, featuring Bobby McFerrin, Gretchen Parlato, and a special guest appearance by Paul Simon. Spalding also raised money for the organization during her summer tour.

Other supporters over the years have included Carla Gugino, Vincent Kartheiser, Camilla Belle, Forest Whitaker, Demi Moore, and Ashton Kutcher.

== Criticism ==
In response to Kevin Bales's interview with Democracy Now! about Free The Slaves, investigative journalist Christian Parenti wrote a criticism of Bales claiming he had made false claims about the chocolate industry. Specifically, Parenti argues that

Bales goes around fund raising, flogging his book and promoting himself on the basis that he has successfully reformed the chocolate industry and largely halted its use of child labor in West Africa. But no such thing has happened ... Bales' organization FTS defended the chocolate industry when the Department of Labor sought to list cocoa as a product tainted by slave and child labor.
