= Kevin Bales =

American academic in the field of slavery; co-founder of Free the Slaves

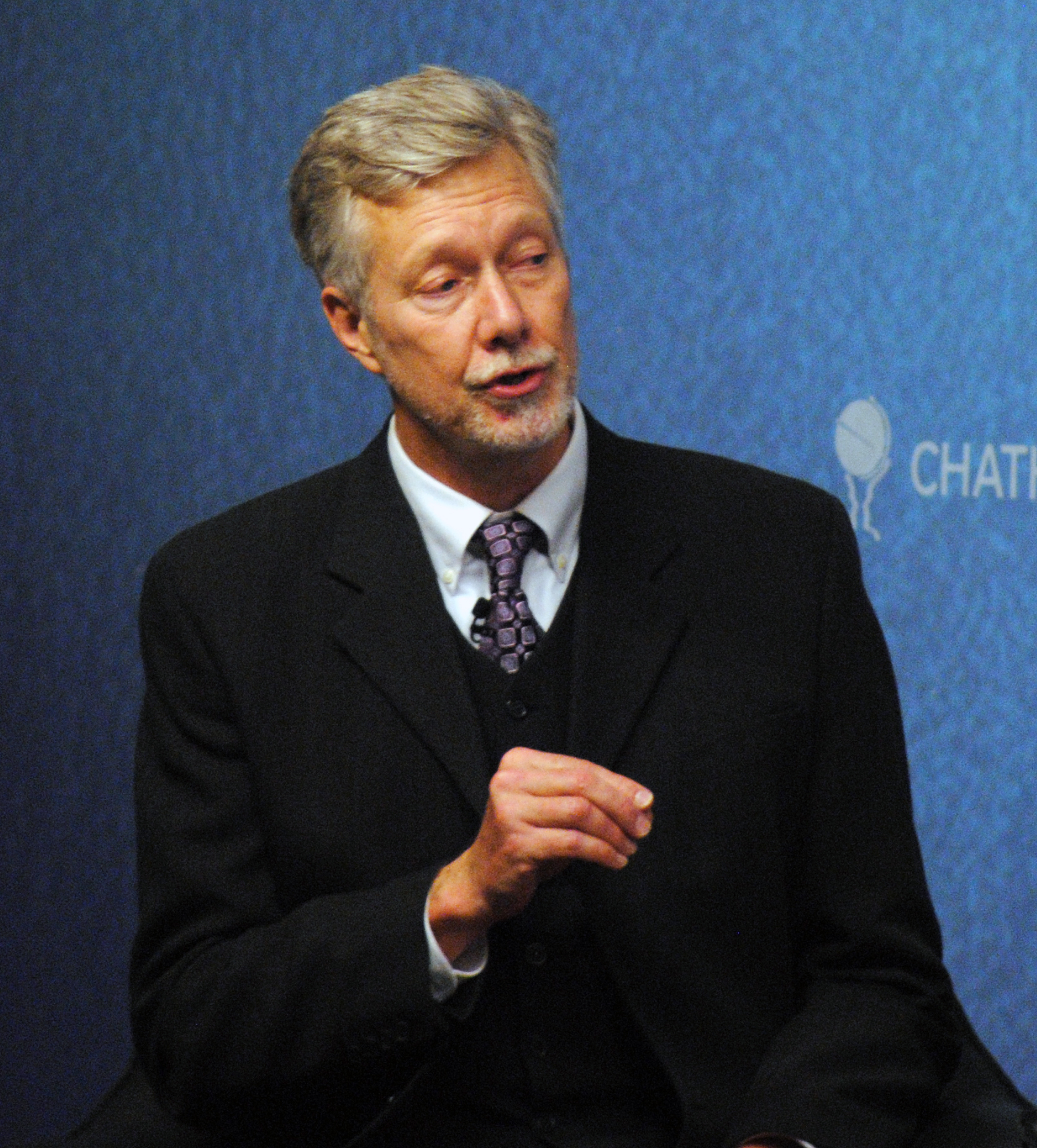
- Bales at Chatham House in 2013
- Born: February 9, 1952 (age 73)
- Education: University of Oklahoma (BA); University of Mississippi (MA); London School of Economics (MSc, PhD)
- Known for: Bales is a member of the Religious Society of Friends (Quakers)
- Scientific career
- Fields: Anti-slavery
- Thesis: Early innovations in social research: the Poverty Survey of Charles Booth (1994)

Kevin Brian Bales CMG (born 1952) is Professor of Contemporary Slavery at the University of Nottingham, co-author of the Global Slavery Index, and was a co-founder and previously president of Free the Slaves, the US sister organization of Anti-Slavery International.

== Professional and academic career ==
Bales graduated from Ponca City High School in Ponca City, Oklahoma, in 1970. Bales earned his Ph.D. at the London School of Economics in 1994 with a thesis on Early innovations in social research: the Poverty Survey of Charles Booth. He also holds a BA in Anthropology, an MA in Sociology, and an MSc in Economic History.

In 1990, Bales partnered with Simon Pell to form the fund-raising and consulting firm Pell & Bales Ltd. The firm's stated goal is to raise funds for medical charities, human rights groups, environmental campaigns, overseas development, and the Labour Party.

Bales has served as a Trustee of Anti-Slavery International and as a consultant to the United Nations Global Program on Trafficking of Human Beings. He has advised various governments on formulating policy on slavery and human trafficking. Bales has also done editing in his line of work for the United Nations, and published a report on forced labor in the US with the Human Rights Center at Berkeley.

In 2015, he worked as Professor of Human Rights at the Pozen Family Center for Human Rights at the University of Chicago. From 2001 to 2005 Bales was a visiting Professor of International Studies at the Croft Institute at the University of Mississippi.

Bales has also served as Professor of Contemporary Slavery at the University of Nottingham and as Emeritus Professor of Sociology at Roehampton University in London. He served on the board of directors of the International Cocoa Initiative, and currently serves on the board of the Freedom Fund. Kevin Bales also served as a Professor of Contemporary Slavery at the Wilberforce Institute for the Study of Slavery and Emancipation at the University of Hull.

== Books ==
Bales has written several books on modern slavery. One of his best-known books is Disposable People: New Slavery in the Global Economy (1999; revised edition, 2004, further edition 2012), an analysis of five slave-based businesses: prostitution in Thailand, the selling of water in Mauritania, production of charcoal in Brazil, general agriculture in India, and brickmaking in Pakistan. Archbishop Desmond Tutu called the book "a well researched, scholarly and deeply disturbing expose of modern slavery". The book has been published in ten different languages. The book formed the basis for a film, Slavery: A Global Investigation, made by TrueVision in 2000, which won a Peabody Award.

== Awards and recognitions ==
In 2000 Bales was awarded the Premio Viareggio prize for his services to humanity. In 2003 he received the Human Rights Award from the University of Alberta; in 2004, the Judith Sargeant Murray Award for Human Rights; and in 2005 the Laura Smith Davenport Human Rights Award. In 2006 the association of British Universities named Bales' work as one of the top "100 world-changing discoveries of the last fifty years". Two years later in 2008, Utne Reader named him one of "50 Visionaries Who Are Changing Your World". In 2008 he was also invited to address the Summit of Nobel Peace Laureates in Paris, and to join in the planning of the 2009 Clinton Global Initiative. The following year he was awarded a Prime Mover fellowship, and in 2010 awarded an honorary doctorate by Loyola University of Chicago for "outstanding service on behalf of human rights and social justice."

Most recently, Bales received the 2011 University of Louisville Grawemeyer Award for Improving World Order.

Bales was appointed Companion of the Order of St Michael and St George (CMG) in the 2017 New Year Honours for services to the global antislavery movement.

== Selected bibliography ==
=== Books ===
- Bales, Kevin (1999). Disposable People: New Slavery in the Global Economy (2004; 2012) ISBN 9780520243842
- Bales, Kevin (2005). Understanding Global Slavery: A Reader ISBN 9780520245075
- Bales, Kevin (2005). New Slavery: A Reference Handbook ISBN 9781576072394
- Bales, Kevin (2007). Ending Slavery: How We Free Today's Slaves ISBN 9781435611511
- Bales, Kevin; Trodd, Zoe (2008). To Plead Our Own Cause: Personal Stories by Today's Slaves ISBN 9780520257962
- Bales, Kevin; Malbert, Roger; Sealy, Mark (2008). Documenting Disposable People: Contemporary Global Slavery ISBN 9781853322648
- Bales, Kevin; Soodalter, Ron (2009). The Slave Next Door: Human Trafficking and Slavery in America Today ISBN 9780520268661
- Bales, Kevin; Trodd, Zoe; Williamson, Alex Kent (2009). Modern Slavery: The Secret World of 27 Million People ISBN 9781851686414
- Bales, Kevin (2016). Blood and Earth: Modern Slavery, Ecocide, and the Secret to Saving the World ISBN 9780812995763

=== Chapters in books ===
- Bales, Kevin (2003), "Because she looks like a child", in Hochschild, Arlie; Ehrenreich, Barbara (eds.), Global woman: nannies, maids, and sex workers in the new economy, New York: Metropolitan Books, pp. 207–229, ISBN 9780805075090.

== Criticism ==
In 2007, in response to Kevin Bales' interview with Democracy Now! about Free The Slaves, investigative journalist Christian Parenti wrote a criticism of Bales, alleging he had made false claims about the chocolate industry. Specifically, Parenti argued that "Bales goes around fund raising, flogging his book and promoting himself on the basis that he has successfully reformed the chocolate industry and largely halted its use of child labor in West Africa. But no such thing has happened... Bales’ organization FTS defended the chocolate industry when the Department of Labor sought to list cocoa as a product tainted by slave and child labor." Bales' work has also come under criticism by sociologist Julia O'Connell Davidson.
