= Annika Markovic =

Swedish diplomat

Her Excellency Datu Annika Markovic GCrS
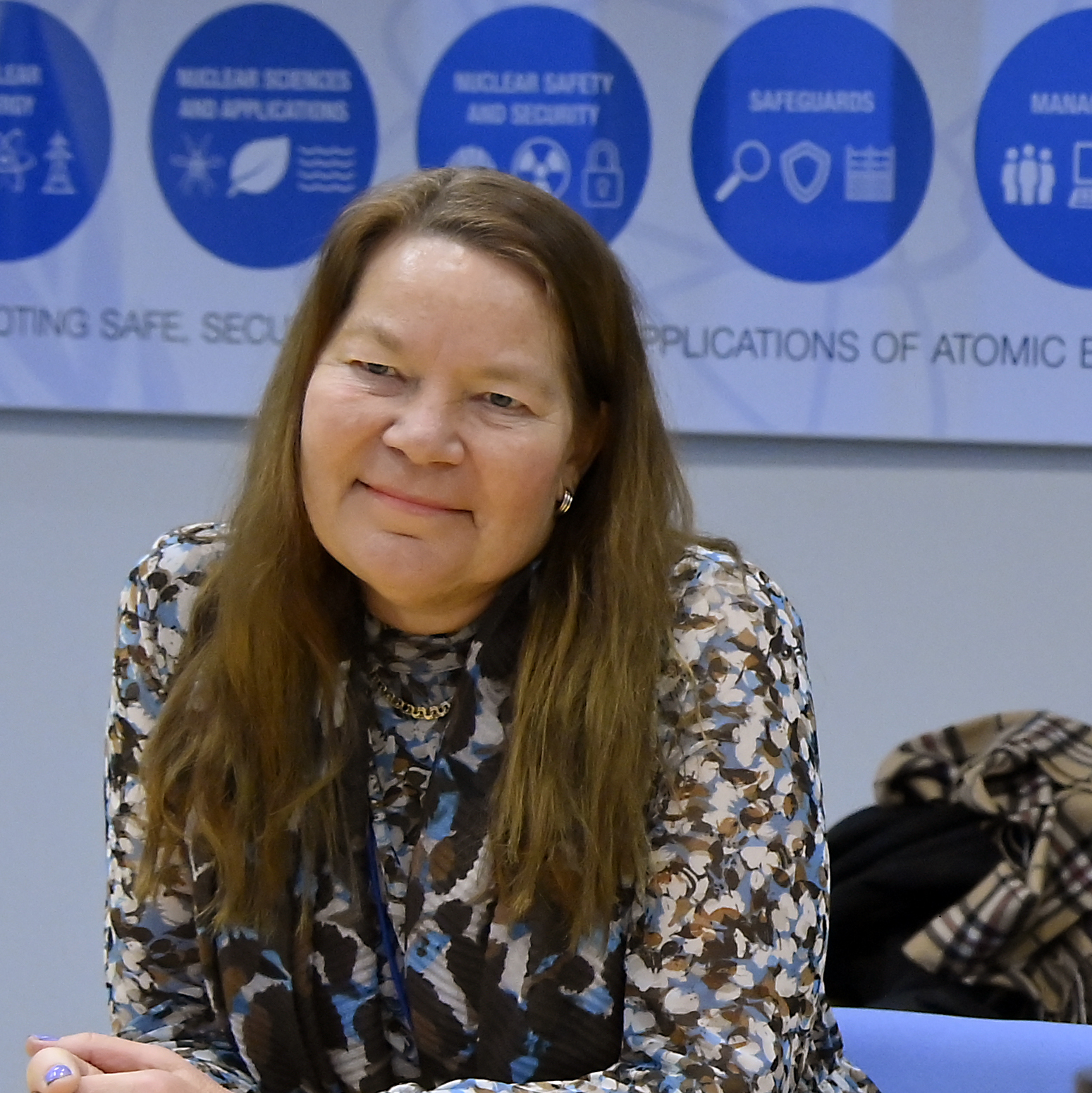
- Markovic in 2024

Ambassador of Sweden to Austria
- In office 26 August 2021 – 31 August 2025
- Preceded by: Mikaela Kumlin Granit
- Succeeded by: Annika Ben David

Ambassador of Sweden to the Netherlands
- In office 1 September 2018 – 18 March 2021
- Preceded by: Per Holmström
- Succeeded by: Johannes Oljelund

Permanent Representative of Sweden to the OECD
- In office 2014–2018
- Preceded by: Anders Ahnlid
- Succeeded by: Anna Brandt

Ambassador of Sweden to Brazil
- In office August 2007 – 31 August 2011
- Preceded by: Margareta Winberg
- Succeeded by: Magnus Robach

Ambassador of Sweden to the Philippines
- In office 2003–2007
- Preceded by: Ulf Håkansson
- Succeeded by: Inger Ultvedt

Personal details
- Born: Annika Lisa Markovic; 9 June 1964 (age 62) Stockholm, Sweden
- Education: Stockholm University; Sorbonne University
- Occupation: Diplomat

Annika Lisa Markovic (born 9 June 1964) is a Swedish diplomat. From 1 September 2025 Annika Markovic has joined the Stockholm Environment Institute as their Engagement and Impact Director. She is currently responsible for communication and outreach building a bridge between science and policy decisions. She has formerly been appointed as the ambassador to Austria and Slovakia from 2021 to 2025, the Netherlands from 2018 to 2021, Brazil from 2008 to 2011, and the Philippines from 2003 to 2007.

== Education ==
Markovic majored in social sciences from the upper secondary school Brännkyrka Gymnasium in 1982, and received her degree from the Stockholm University in business economics in 1986. She also has a diploma from the Sorbonne University in Paris, certification of Langue et de Civilisation in 1983.

== Diplomatic career ==
=== Philippines ===
Markovic began as the first secretary at the Swedish Mission to the United Nations in New York City from 1995 to 1999. Later, she became the deputy director at the Ministry of Foreign Affairs' multilateral department from 2000 to 2003. She would receive her first high-raking appointed as the Ambassador to the Philippines and Palau from 2003 to 2007.

=== Brazil ===
On 20 June 2007, the Swedish government designated Ambassador Markovic as its next envoy to Brasilia, Brazil. She has worked with the UN and disarmament matters at the Ministry of Foreign Affairs, among other things. Her official term started in August 2007. Both side-accredited as Sweden's ambassador to Suriname and in Brasília. On 31 January 2008, she gave President Luiz Inácio Lula da Silva her letters of credential. On 31 August 2011, Markovic left her position as ambassador to Brasilia.

=== United Nations ===
She then served as an environmental ambassador for the Ministry of the Environment and the Ministry of Foreign Affairs from 1 September 2011 to February 2014. For both Ministries, she was named co-chair of the CCAC. Following the UN Climate Summit in September 2014, she resigned from her role as co-chair of the CCAC to resume her "day job" as Permanent Representative of Sweden to the OECD and Permanent Delegate to UNESCO in Paris.

The CCAC has decided to increase the scope of its initiatives in the areas of agriculture, methane reduction in the oil and gas industry, alternative refrigeration, cleaner transportation, and municipal solid waste management. The Coalition's explosive expansion is proof that its members are really motivated to change the world. They have been able to support this effort so enthusiastically because they are searching for a platform to create tangible results," Markovic said in April 2014.

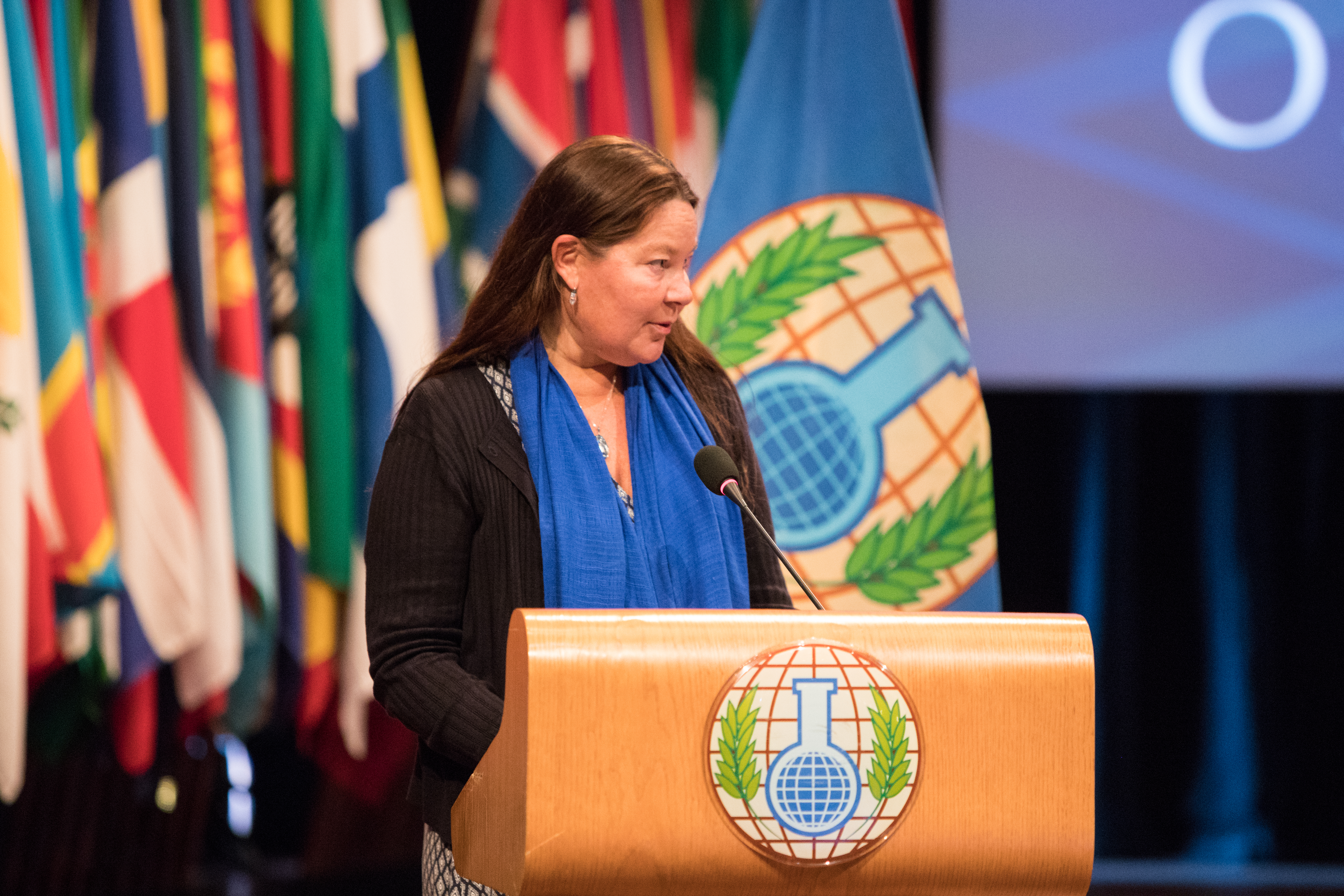
Markovic speaking at OPCW's conference in 2018

Markovic was selected by the Swedish government to serve as the OECD and UNSECO ambassador in Paris on 20 January 2014. She started working there on 17 February 2014. On 31 August 2018, she concluded her tenure as an ambassador for OECD and UNSECO, and be reappointed as the Permanent Representative to the Organisation for the Prohibition of Chemical Weapons and to the International Criminal Court in The Hague 2018 to 2021.

On 10 July 2018, Audrey Azoulay, the Director-General of UNESCO, and Markovic signed a Programme Cooperation Agreement (PCA) in which Sweden agreed to provide SEK430 million, or roughly US$48 million, over the course of four years in addition to its annual budgetary contribution to the organisation. Sweden has committed a historic amount of nearly US$100 million in voluntary donations to the Organization's programs, including assistance for UNESCO's national initiatives.

On 28 November 2014, UNESCO Director-General Irina Bokova and Markovic signed a Programme Cooperation Agreement (PCA) to the value of close to SEK400 million over a four-year period. On 16 September 2021, Ghada Waly, the Director-General of the United Nations Office at Vienna (UNOV), received the credentials of Markovic, the newly appointed Permanent Representative of Sweden.

=== Netherlands ===
She would be appointed as the new Ambassador of Sweden to the Netherlands on 1 September 2018, taking over Per Holmström. Markovic and Ines Coppoolse took part in a webinar that we co-hosted with the Swedish Chamber on 4 June 2020, discussing their thoughts and observations about their respective nations.

=== Austria and Slovakia ===
On 16 September 2021, President Alexander Van der Bellen received the credentials of Markovic, the recently appointed Swedish ambassador to Austria. In addition, She serves as Sweden's Permanent Delegate to the International Organisations in Vienna as well as its Ambassador to Slovakia. On 11 January 2022, at the Ministry of Defence, Markovic was received by Defence Minister Jaroslav Naď. The goal of the conversation, which was Ambassador Markovic's first chance to speak with the Defence Minister since accepting her position in the Diplomatic Service, was to examine potential avenues for future bilateral collaboration between the two nations.

== Honours ==
The outgoing Markovic was awarded the Order of Sikatuna with the title of Datu (Grand Cross) by the President in recognition of her excellent and sterling service as her nation's envoy in the Philippines. In recognition of his services as an ambassador in Brasilia, Markovic was awarded the Order of the Southern Cross in 2011.

- (Philippines) Grand Cross of the Order of Sikatuna (GCrS; 2007) – Datu
- (Brazil) Grand Cross of the Order of the Southern Cross (2011)

== Personal life ==
Markovic is bilingual in English and Swedish. She has three kids and is married.

Diplomatic posts
Preceded by Ulf Håkansson	Ambassador of Sweden to the Philippines; 2003–2007	Succeeded by Inger Ultvedt
Preceded by Ulf Håkansson	Ambassador of Sweden to Palau; 2003–2007	Succeeded by Inger Ultvedt
Preceded by Margareta Winberg	Ambassador of Sweden to Brazil; 2007–2011	Succeeded by Magnus Robach
Preceded by Anders Ahnlid	Permanent Representative of Sweden to the OECD; 2014–2018	Succeeded by Anna Brandt
Preceded by Per Holmström	Ambassador of Sweden to the Netherlands; 2018–2021	Succeeded by Johannes Oljelund
Preceded by Mikaela Kumlin Granit	Ambassador of Sweden to Austria; 2021–2025	Succeeded by Annika Ben David
Preceded by Mikaela Kumlin Granit	Ambassador of Sweden to Slovakia; 2021–2025	Succeeded by Annika Ben David
