= Margareta Winberg =

Swedish politician (born 1947)

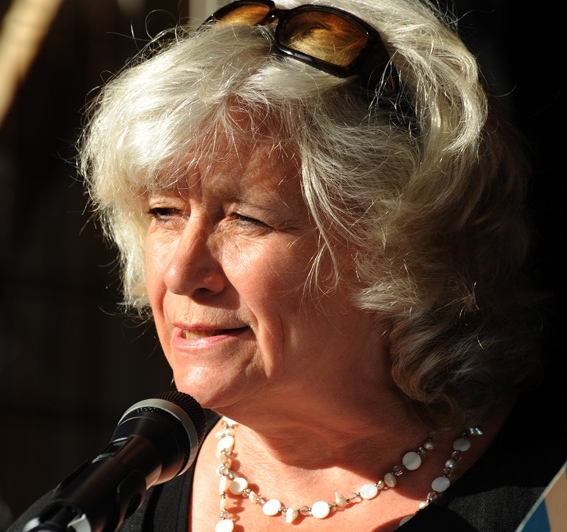
- Margareta Winberg in June 2013

Deputy Prime Minister of Sweden
- In office 21 October 2002 – 31 October 2003
- Prime Minister: Göran Persson
- Preceded by: Lena Hjelm-Wallén
- Succeeded by: Marita Ulvskog (Acting)

Minister of Gender Equality
- In office 7 October 1998 – 21 October 2002
- Prime Minister: Göran Persson
- Preceded by: Ulrica Messing
- Succeeded by: Mona Sahlin

Minister for Agriculture, Food, and Fisheries
- In office 7 October 1998 – 21 October 2002
- Prime Minister: Göran Persson
- Preceded by: Annika Åhnberg
- Succeeded by: Ann-Christin Nykvist
- In office 7 October 1994 – 22 March 1996
- Prime Minister: Ingvar Carlsson
- Preceded by: Karl Erik Olsson
- Succeeded by: Annika Åhnberg

Minister for Employment
- In office 22 March 1996 – 7 October 1998
- Prime Minister: Göran Persson
- Preceded by: Anders Sundström
- Succeeded by: Björn Rosengren

Personal details
- Born: Gun Margareta Gustafsson; 13 August 1947 (age 78) Sjuntorp, Sweden
- Party: Swedish Social Democratic Party
- Spouse: Jörn Svensson
- Children: 3

Gun Margareta Winberg (born Gustafsson 13 August 1947) is a Swedish Social Democratic politician. Winberg held various ministerial posts in the Third cabinet of Ingvar Carlsson and the Cabinet of Göran Persson from 1994 to 2003, and was Deputy Prime Minister of Sweden from 2002 to 2003. She was minister for agriculture, food and fisheries from 1994 to 1996, and again from 1998 to 2002, minister for employment from 1996 to 1998, and, in addition, held the position of minister for gender equality from 1998 to 2003.

She became a very controversial figure in the public debate, after an interview she gave to the Swedish documentary The Gender War in 2005. In the second part of the two-part documentary, Winberg expressed strong support for radical feminism, for the ideologist Eva Lundgren, and for requiring institutes of higher education to teach feminist theory as fact, in order to change society.

Within the Social Democrats, she had a euro-sceptic profile, and was one of two ministers campaigning for the "no" side in the 1994 referendum on Sweden's membership in the European Union. She similarly was against adopting the euro, but as deputy prime minister, she held a low profile in the 2003 referendum on the issue.

From 2003 to 2007, she served as Sweden's ambassador to Brazil.

Political offices
| Preceded by Karl Erik Olsson | Minister for Agriculture, Food and Fisheries; 1994–1996 | Succeeded by Annika Åhnberg |
| Preceded by Anders Sundström | Minister for Employment; 1996–1998 | Succeeded by Björn Rosengren |
| Preceded by Annika Åhnberg | Minister for Agriculture, Food and Fisheries; 1998–2002 | Succeeded by Ann-Christin Nykvist |
| Preceded by Ulrica Messing | Minister for Gender Equality; 1998–2003 | Succeeded by Mona Sahlin |
| Preceded by Lena Hjelm-Wallén | Deputy Prime Minister of Sweden; 2002–2003 | Succeeded by Marita Ulvskog |
Diplomatic posts
| Preceded by Staffan Åberg | Ambassador of Sweden to Brazil; 2003–2007 | Succeeded by Annika Markovic |
