= Croft Institute for International Studies =

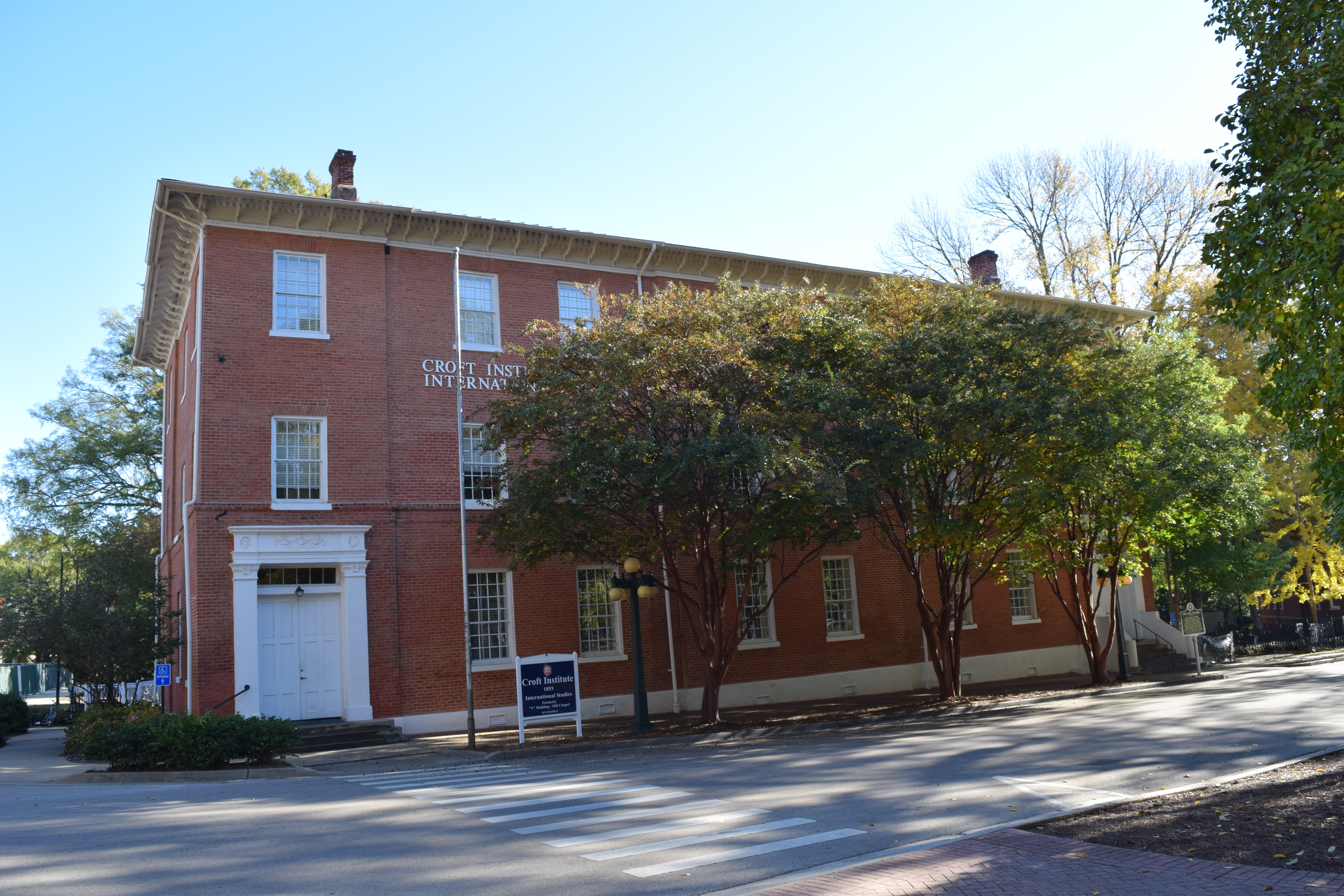
Croft Institute building

The Croft Institute for International Studies (or Croft) offers a B.A. degree in international studies in conjunction with the University of Mississippi's college of Liberal Arts. The degree combines the study of global economics, history, politics and social relations with the study of languages and cultures in a multidisciplinary curriculum.

The Croft Institute for International Studies at The University of Mississippi was established in 1997 with major financial support from the Joseph C. Bancroft Charitable & Educational Fund. The Croft Institute's first full year of operation was the academic year 1998/99.
