= Bridget Perrier =

Canadian activist

- Born: 1977 (age 48–49); Thunder Bay, Ontario, Canada
- Occupations: Anti-prostitution activist, former prostitute
- Organization: Sex Trade 101
- Children: Tanner (deceased)

Bridget Perrier (born 1976) is a Canadian activist and former trafficked prostitute who co-founded Sex Trade 101 with Natasha Falle.

Perrier became a child prostitute at the age of 12, while she was staying at a group home, and an older girl there persuaded her to become a runaway, in order to sell sex to a pedophile named Charlie. She had a son, Tanner, who developed cancer as an infant and died at the age of five, with the dying wish that his mother "stop working" in the sex industry.

In 2000, Perrier moved to Toronto from Thunder Bay, Ontario, Canada. She is the stepmother of Angel, whose biological mother was Brenda Wolfe, one of Robert Pickton's murder victims.

In 2009, Perrier accompanied Angel at Toronto's Native Women's Resource Centre for the Sisters in Spirit vigil, in remembrance of Wolfe and the other more than 500 Canadian Aboriginal women who have been murdered or gone missing over the past 30 years.

In 2010, Perrier picketed a courthouse in downtown Toronto, in recognition of International Day of No Prostitution. She was joined by Trisha Baptie, Natasha Falle, Katarina MacLeod, and Christine Barkhouse, all former human trafficking victims.

In 2012, after being removed from a news conference relating to Bedford v. Canada, Perrier demonstrated a pimp stick to the media, saying that she had been battered with a stick by her pimp every day that he prostituted her. Perrier opposed the legalization of brothels, as proposed in Bedford v. Canada, saying, "Having a legal bawdy house is not going to make it any safer. You are still going to attract serial killers, rapists, perverts." Bridget shared her story in the article by Dr. Vincent J. Felitti in Cancer InCytes magazine (vol. 2, issue 1) about how childhood trauma is associated with chronic diseases during adulthood, and how child trafficking will eventually worsen the economic burden on civil governance.
