= Södertälje case =

The Södertälje case (Swedish: Södertäljefallet) was an alleged case of satanic ritual abuse that led to prosecution and convictions in Sweden in the early 1990s. In 1992 a 15-year-old girl from Södertälje accused her parents of sexual abuse and of murdering children in satanic rituals. She also claimed that she and her younger sister were sold for prostitution in sex clubs in Stockholm. Both parents were convicted but in a retrial the mother was freed and the father's sentence was reduced.
