= Palais Szeps =

Palace in Vienna, Austria

Coordinates: 48.2226°N 16.3581°E

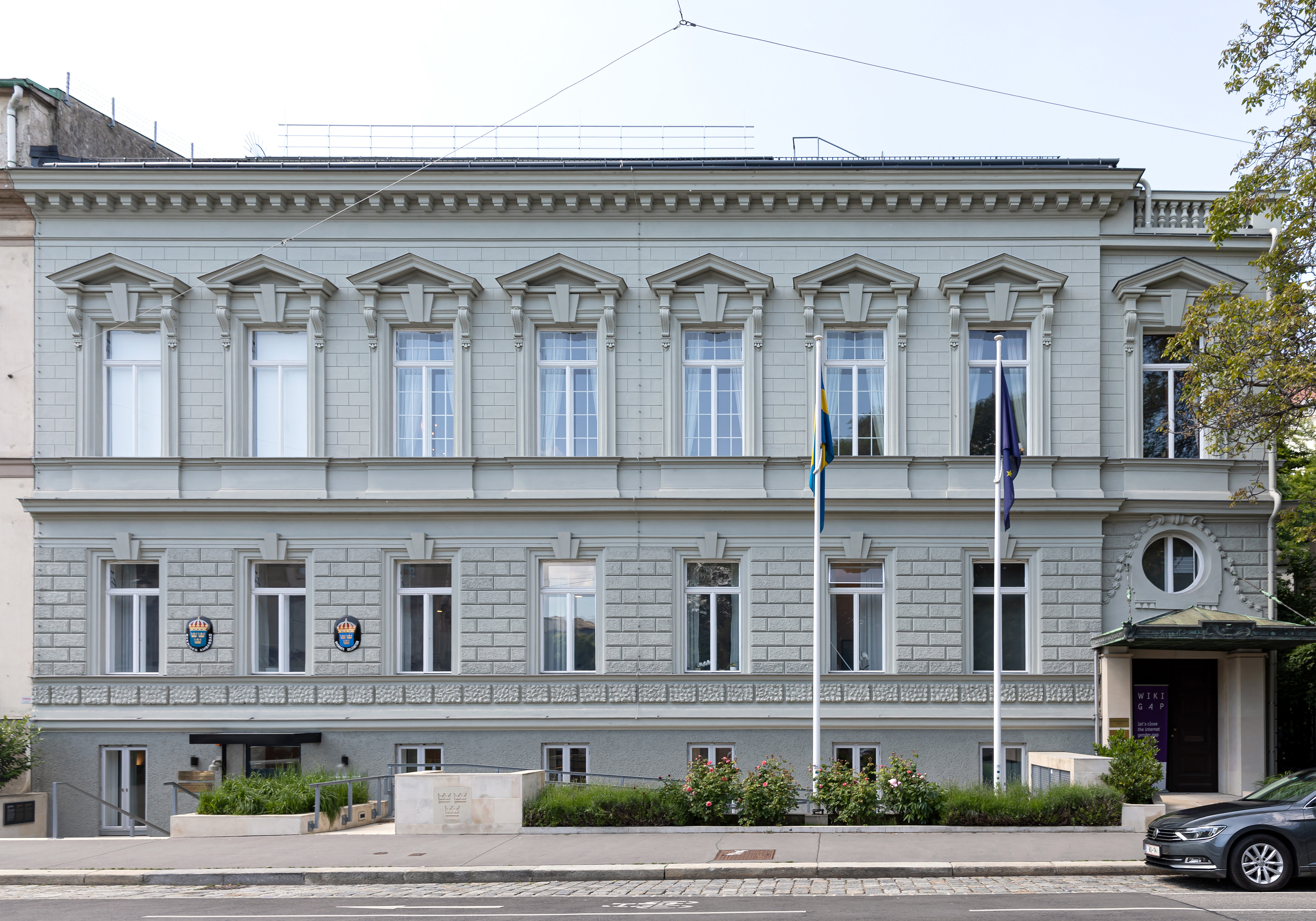
Palais Szeps (2019)

Palais Szeps is located at Liechtensteinstraße 51 in Vienna's 9th district Alsergrund.

== History ==
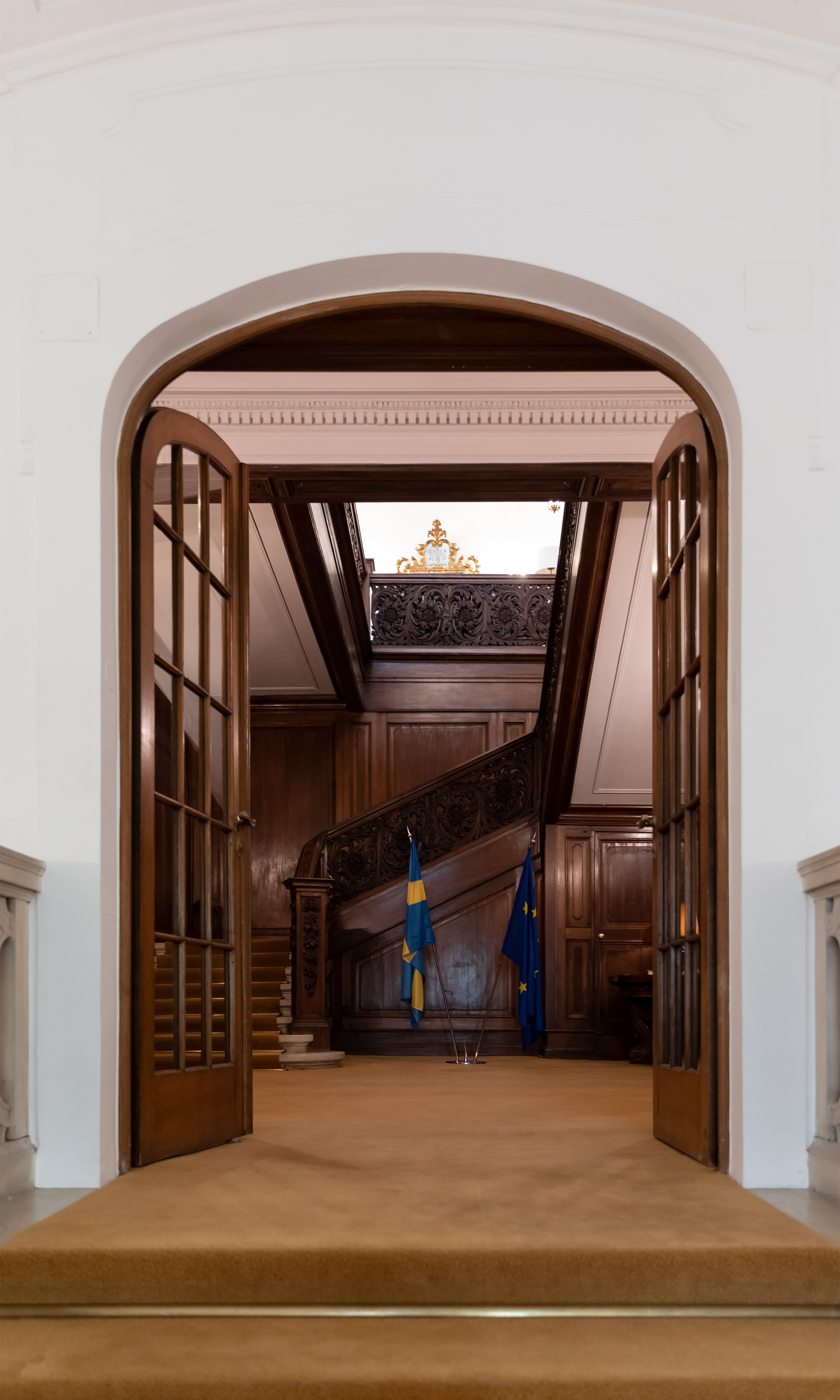
Aufgang zur Beletage

The palace was built in 1876/77 by Ludwig Tischler for the newspaper publisher Moritz Szeps. Szeps was a confidant of Crown Prince Rudolf and publisher of the Neues Wiener Tagblatt since 1867.

Purchased by the Swedish state in 1928, the building has been the site of the Swedish Embassy in Austria since 1960. From 2013 to 2015, it was renovated and partly rebuilt. Since 2014, it has been a listed building protected for as a cultural heritage site.

== Architecture ==
The architecture is Viennese New Renaissance from the Wilhelminian period. In the Beletage it has strong gable roofing, the entrance hall is barrel-vaulted and has a coffered ceiling.
