= The Gender War =

2005 Swedish documentary film about feminism

- Könskriget
- Directed by: Evin Rubar
- Produced by: Nordisk Film
- Starring: Margareta Winberg, Eva Lundgren, Ireen von Wachenfeldt, Gunilla Ekberg
- Edited by: Lars Tidblom
- Distributed by: Sveriges Television SVT2
- Release date: 2005
- Running time: 120 minutes (in two parts)
- Country: Sweden
- Language: Swedish

The Gender War (Swedish: Könskriget) is a Swedish documentary film in two parts by journalist Evin Rubar on radical feminism in Sweden and its influence on Swedish politics. It was produced by Nordisk Film and broadcast by Sveriges Television in the series Dokument inifrån on 15 and 22 May 2005. The Gender War was also part of Evin Rubar being awarded the TV award Kristallen and Sveriges Television's equality award the same year.

The documentary focuses on the national organisation for women’s and young women's shelters in Sweden, ROKS, an organisation helping young female victims of sexual abuse called Friends of Bella, former Minister of Gender Equality Margareta Winberg and Professor Eva Lundgren.

== Effects ==
The documentary made a big impact on the debate in the Swedish mainstream media and had several major consequences. Uppsala University decided to make an inquiry into Eva Lundgren's research. Lundgren was freed from the official accusations but received severe criticism in the media; later the university increased her funding in compensation for the unjustified inquiry and stated their support for her in 2007. However, in 2011 she resigned from her chair and criticized the university for not doing enough to clear her reputation.

The Riksdag discussed withdrawing funding from ROKS. Gudrun Schyman, the spokesperson for the Feminist Initiative, questioned Rubar's main argument in an article in the Svenska Dagbladet newspaper on May 24, 2005. Some women's shelters announced that they would be leaving the central organisation ROKS because of the controversy. Ireen von Wachenfeldt announced her resignation as the chairperson of ROKS on July 6, 2005.

The New York Times wrote that the film showed that militant feminism was widespread in Sweden and reached into official circles, and quoted von Wachenfeldt, who said that "men are animals" in the document.

== Swedish Broadcasting Commission complaints ==
The aired program received a record number of complaints from the regulatory body Swedish Broadcasting Commission (a total of 174). The first complaints did not lead to a conviction and the commission report stated the film is aligned neutrally, but in one respect lacking in the requirement for objectivity.

However, after another complaint by two of the other women that were part of the events described in the first part of the show, this part of the film was convicted of non-neutrality since their version of events was not requested "in time" and was not presented in the show. This decision led the makers of the documentary to file an appeal of the Swedish Broadcasting Commission to the Parliamentary Ombudsman for a conflict of interest, since one of the commissioners on the board, Lena Adelsohn Liljeroth, had been active in one of the women's shelters connected to ROKS. Their report has not yet provoked a response from the Parliamentary Ombudsman.
