= Trisha Baptie =

Canadian anti-prostitution activist

- Born: 1973 (age 52–53)
- Citizenship: Canadian
- Occupations: Anti-prostitution activist, journalist
- Organization: EVE
- Website: www.honourconsulting.com

Trisha Baptie (born 1973) is a Vancouver-based citizen journalist and activist for the abolition of prostitution.

== Biography ==
Baptie was first forced into prostitution at the age of 13. This was the beginning of her 15-year period in the sex-industry, both indoor and outdoor, most of which was spent in Vancouver's Downtown Eastside area.

At the age of 28, Baptie took the opportunity to exit prostitution.

In 2007, Baptie became a citizen journalist for Orato, an online newspaper, to cover the murder trial of Robert Pickton, most of whose victims were picked up from the Downtown Eastside. Many of Pickton's victims were known to Baptie.

In 2009, Baptie co-founded EVE (formerly Exploited Voices now Educating), a non-profit organization of former sex-industry women dedicated to recognizing prostitution as violence against women and seeking its abolition through political action, advocacy, and public education.

In 2009–2010, Baptie was a community mobilizer in the "Buying Sex is Not a Sport" campaign, in preparation for the 2010 Winter Olympics held in Vancouver. She was a focal speaker in the Langara Dialogues, a public forum in which the subjects of prostitution, human trafficking, community responsibility, abolition, legalization, and their ties to the Olympics were discussed and debated.

In 2010, Baptie appeared in a documentary film, Our Lives to Fight For. She also joined Christine Barkhouse, Natasha Falle, Katarina MacLeod, and Bridget Perrier in Toronto, in picketing the repeal of prostitution laws. All five women are survivors of human trafficking who had been forced into prostitution in Canada.

Baptie's life and work are central in the 2013 film Buying Sex, directed by Teresa MacInnes and Kent Nason, and facilitated by the Canadian National Film Board.

== Honours and awards ==
In 2008, Baptie won the Courage to Come Back award.
