= Brian McConaghy =

Forensic scientist

- Born: 1963 (age 62–63); Belfast, Northern Ireland, UK
- Citizenship: Canadian
- Known for: Founding Ratanak International
- Scientific career
- Fields: Forensic science
- Institutions: Royal Canadian Mounted Police; Vancouver Forensic Laboratory; Ratanak International

Brian McConaghy (born 1963) is the founder of Ratanak International and a former Canadian forensic scientist who left the Royal Canadian Mounted Police (RCMP) in order to dedicate all his energies to ending child abuse and human trafficking in Cambodia.

== Ratanak International ==
He had founded Ratanak International, in 1989, a Christian charity dedicated to helping the people of Cambodia rebuild their country that for decades had been torn apart by civil war, revolution and genocide. From 1990 onwards McConaghy and Ratanak partnered on projects that built clinics, hospitals and schools, opened orphanages, provided shelters for the elderly and AIDS victims and ran and initiated emergency food distribution programs in response to droughts and flooding in Cambodia. In 2004, these relief projects continued, yet Ratanak's work also took on a whole new dimension by beginning to work on the front lines in Cambodia on projects that rescue and rehabilitate children sold into sexual slavery.

McConaghy named the organization Ratanak, which means 'precious gem' in Khmer, after he watched an 11-month-old Cambodian baby called Ratanak die because of a basic lack of medical aid in John Pilger's documentary film Cambodia Year Ten. Since watching this video McConaghy and Ratanak have been dedicated to preventing such needless suffering and death in Cambodia.

McConaghy grew up in Northern Ireland and his family emigrated to Canada in 1978. He used to work for the Vancouver Forensic Laboratory as a firearm and tool-mark examination specialist. After founding Ratanak International, he continued to help the RCMP as a consultant, providing them with crucial information about the identity of the child sexual abuse victims in the case of Donald Bakker. He also did forensic work on the women murdered by Robert Pickton, testifying that Andrea Joesbury, Sereena Abotsway, and Mona Wilson had all been decapitated with a reciprocating saw. McConaghy was the guest speaker at the 2011 Manitoba Prayer Breakfast. He lives in Vancouver with his wife and two children, both adopted from Cambodia.
