= Evin Rubar =

Swedish TV journalist and documentarian (born 1975)

Evin Rubar (born 14 December 1975) is a Swedish TV journalist and documentarian. Her family is of Kurdish origin.

== Filmography ==
- I skolans våld (In the School's Clutches), 2003
- Könskriget (The Gender War), 2005
- Det svenska sveket, 2007
- Syndabockarna, 2008
- Slaget om muslimerna, 2009
- Vårdlotteriet, 2011

== Awards ==
- Stiftelsen Staten och Rättens journalism award in 2003 for I skolans våld (In the School's Clutches)
- Guldspaden (The Golden Spade) in 2005 for Könskriget (The Gender War)
- Kristallen (The Crystal) in 2005
