= International Day of No Prostitution =

Awareness day held and recognised by people against sex work

- Observed by: Anti-sex work feminists
- Date: October 5
- Next time: October 5, 2026
- Frequency: annual

International Day of No Prostitution (IDNP) is an awareness day celebrated to oppose the practice of sex work. First observed in 2002, the event takes place annually on the 5th of October.

== History ==
The IDNP was first observed in 2002; during its inaugural year, events were held to recognise it in the San Francisco Bay Area of California, and Melbourne, Victoria.

In 2005, the University of the Philippines Institute of Human Rights and the Asia-Pacific chapter of the Coalition Against Trafficking in Women (CATW) organized an IDNP event at which they discussed the Anti-Trafficking in Persons Act of 2003. In 2008, there was an IDNP candlelight vigil in Phoenix, Arizona; a second such vigil took place again in 2010 in the same location, with some of the city's leaders and some former sex workers amongst the participants.

Also in 2010, CATW observed IDNP by opposing the decision in Bedford v. Canada to strike down Canada's anti-sex work laws. A group of former human trafficking victims and former sex workers in Canada also opposed the striking down of these laws, picketing a courthouse in downtown Toronto, Ontario in recognition of IDNP.

In 2011, People Working Against Prostitution, an organization in the Philippines, expressed disappointment that the Cagayan de Oro city council did not host any events in recognition of IDNP.
