= Andreas Carlgren =

Swedish politician (born 1958)

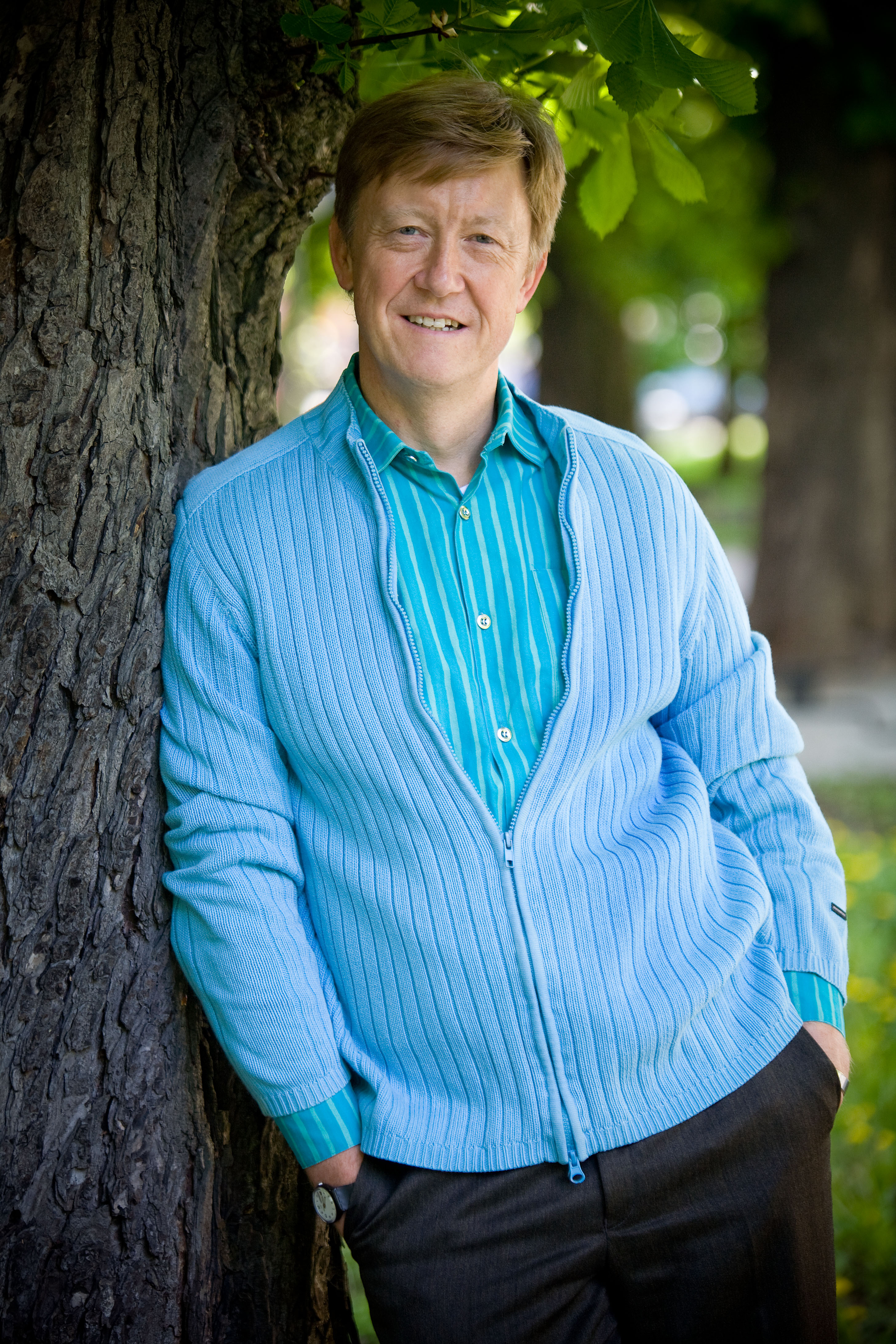

Minister for the Environment
- In office 6 October 2006 – 29 September 2011
- Prime Minister: Fredrik Reinfeldt
- Preceded by: Lena Sommestad
- Succeeded by: Lena Ek

Personal details
- Born: 8 July 1958 (age 68) Upplands-Bro, Sweden
- Party: Centre Party
- Spouse: Tomas Harila
- Education: Stockholm University
- Occupation: Teacher

Hemming Andreas Carlgren (born 8 July 1958) is a Swedish Centre Party politician, and a former Minister for the Environment in the Swedish government.

== Education and career ==
Andreas Carlgren was born in Västra Ryd, Upplands-Bro Municipality, Stockholm County. From 1981 and 1983 he studied at Stockholm University to pursue teaching. He then worked as chairman of the Centre Party Youth from 1984 to 1987. From 1987 to 1990 he worked as a teacher, followed by employment at M-gruppen, a training company, to work on environmental development programmes for businesses, including environmental audits. From 1990 to 1994 he served as deputy mayor of Ekerö Municipality, with special responsibility for childcare and schools. From 1994 to 1998 he was elected as a member of the parliament of Sweden. In the parliament he was a member of the Committee on Education. In addition, Carlgren served as second deputy chairman of the Centre Party from 1992 to 1998 and as first deputy chairman from 1998 to 2000.

In 2000, Carlgren was appointed as director-general of the Swedish Integration Board. Following the 2006 general election he was appointed as Minister for the Environment in the new centre-right cabinet. One of the main issues that he had to handle as Minister for the Environment was global warming.

On 29 September 2011, he was succeeded as Minister for the Environment by Lena Ek, who had served as MEP for the Centre Party since 2004. With 4 years and 358 days in office, he is the longest-serving Minister for the Environment.

Carlgren is vice-chair of the Stockholm Environment Institute Board. Carlgren has been on the SEI board since 1 January 2012.

== Personal life ==
In the late 1990s Carlgren divorced, publicly declared that he was gay, and subsequently entered into a registered partnership with his new partner. He is the first openly gay Swedish cabinet minister. Carlgren has three children from his previous marriage.

Party political offices
Preceded by Ylve Sunesson	Chairman of the Centre Party Youth; 1984–1987	Succeeded by Iwar Ahrnstadt
Preceded by Görel Thurdin	Second deputy chairman of the Centre Party; 1992–1998	Succeeded by Maud Olofsson
Preceded by Helena Nilsson Lannegren	First deputy chairman of the Centre Party; 1998–2000	Succeeded by Position abolished
Government offices
Preceded by Lars Stjernkvist	Director-general of the Swedish Integration Board; 2000–2006	Succeeded by Dan Eliasson
Political offices
Preceded by Lena Sommestad	Minister for the Environment; 2006–2011	Succeeded by Lena Ek
