= Loven =

Loven may refer to:

== People ==
- Anja Ringgren Lovén (born 1978), Danish charity worker
- Idun Lovén (1916–1988), Swedish painter, art teacher
- Jennifer Loven (contemporary), an American journalist and a White House press correspondent for the Associated Press
- Sven Ludvig Lovén (1809–1895), a Swedish marine zoologist and malacologist

== Other uses ==
- Konstskolan Idun Lovén, a preparative art school in Stockholm, Sweden
- Leuven, a city in Belgium
- The Danish ship Den Røde Løve, also known as the Løven (Danish: "Lion")

== See also ==
- Lovens (disambiguation)
