= Gottfrid Larsson =

Swedish sculptor

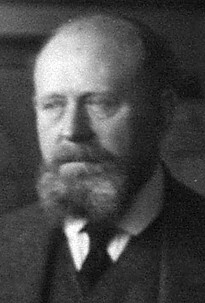
Gottfrid Larsson

Gottfrid Larsson (November 21, 1875 – December 24, 1947) was a Swedish sculptor.

== Biography ==
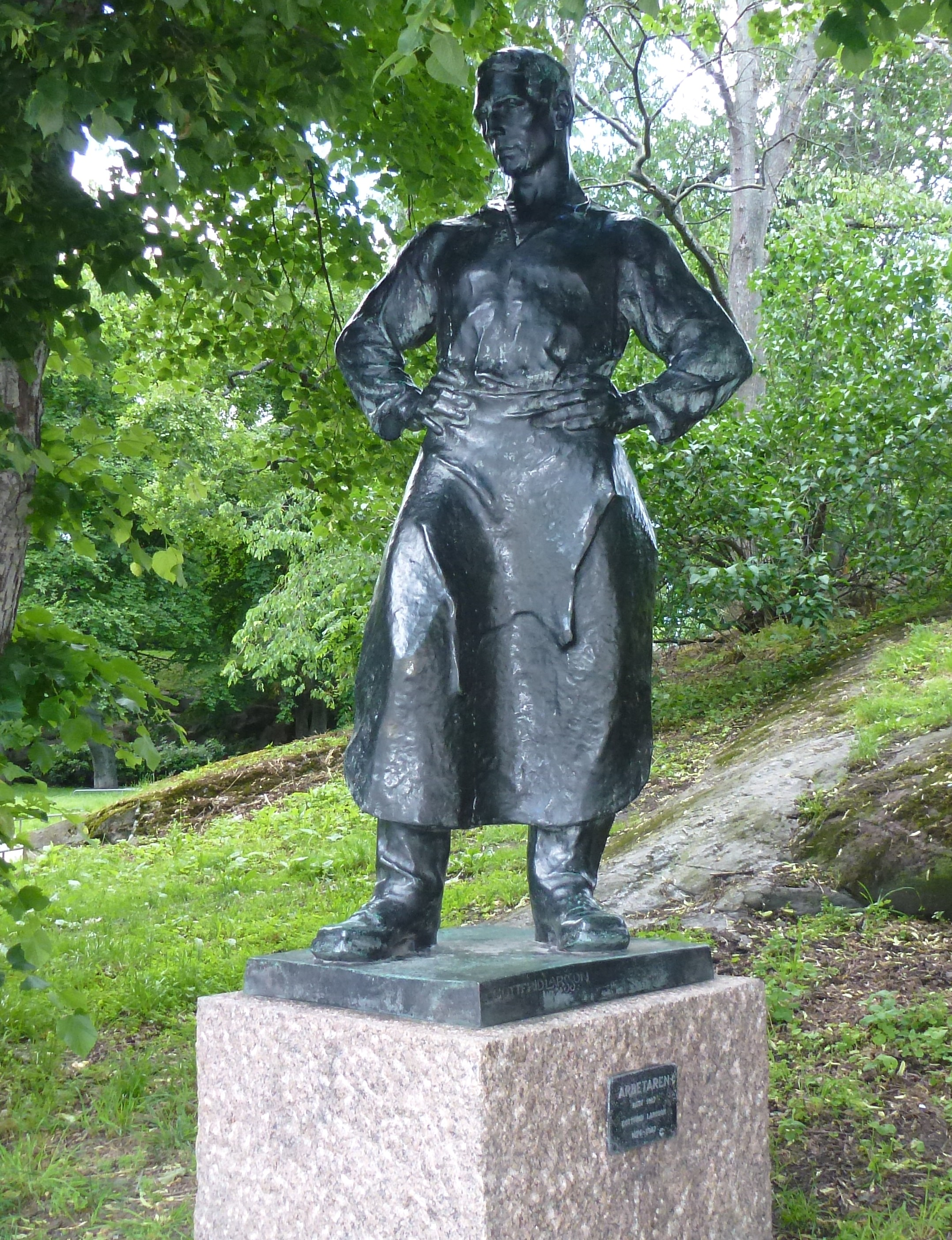
The Worker (1917), bronze statue in Vasaparken in Stockholm

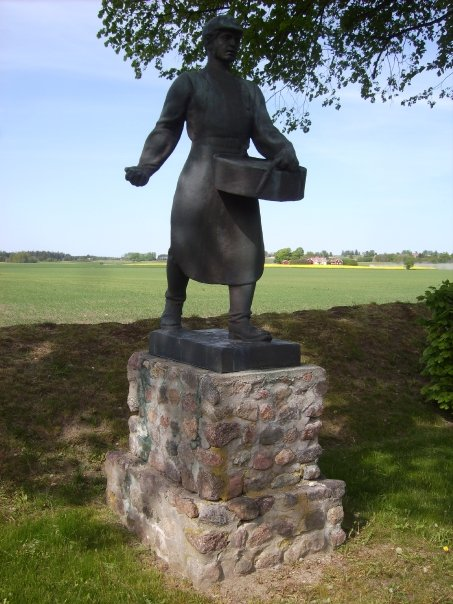
The Sower (1949), bronze statue at Vallerstad church in Östergötland, where he also is buried. The statue is erected in the churchyard there and Gottfrid Larsson was born in Vallerstad and the parish was his birthplace.

Julius Gottfrid Andreas Larsson was born in 1875 in Narveryd's farm in Vallerstad in Mjölby Municipality, five-kilometer northeast of Skänninge in Östergötland. His father was the farmer Anders Larsson. At the age of 14, he came to Norrköping in Östergötland where he stayed and worked as a wood carver and studied wood-carving (wood-engraving) at the Technical Evening School in 1889–1895. Then he came to Stockholm in 1895 and studied at the Tekniska skolan in Stockholm or Konstfack (Högre konstindustriella skolan) there in 1895–1899. In 1900, he received a travel grant from the Svenska Slöjdföreningen and Kommerskollegium and then he continued his studies in Paris at Académie Colarossi in Paris in 1900–1902. He assisted in the Royal Dramatic Theatre's decoration in Stockholm, and, in 1905, he helped Carl Milles with his work for this theatre. The theatre has been at its present location in the Art Nouveau building at Nybroplan in Stockholm since 1908. Famous artists like Carl Milles and Carl Larsson were involved in making the decorations, and some of the interior decorations were made by Prince Eugen. After that, Larsson continued his studies in Munich in 1905–1906 and he spent 1906–1907 in Italy.

== Studies in Paris ==
With the great scholarship from the Royal Swedish Academy of Arts he continued to study in France, and he mostly lived in Paris during the years 1908–1913, with visits to England, Germany, Belgium, and the Netherlands. During his time in Paris he got to know some other Swedish artists, who also studied at the Académie Colarossi in Paris. There were, among others, his artist fellows Erik Tryggelin (1878–1962) and David Wallin (1876–1957). They all became friends for life from their time together in Paris. Académie Colarossi was an art school founded by the Italian sculptor Filippo Colarossi. At this time, it was located in 10 rue de la Grande-Chaumière in the 7th arrondissement of Paris. During his time in Paris, Larsson married the Norwegian woman Karen Sofie Waaler in 1911.

== Foundation of an Art School in Stockholm ==
From 1913, Larsson was working in Stockholm. In 1920, he founded a private art school together with his colleague, the painter and graphic artist Edward Berggren (1876–1961), who had also studied together with him at the Tekniska skolan in Stockholm, now Konstfack (Högre konstindustriella skolan). Both Larsson and Edward Berggren were from Östergötland.

Edward Berggren had studied at the Royal Swedish Academy of Arts in Stockholm from 1897 to 1903. Edward Berggren had been the head of Althins målarskola in Stockholm during 1919–1920. The school Berggren established together with Larsson in Stockholm was named the Edward Berggrens målarskola (Edward Berggren art school). In 1956, the artist Idun Lovén (1916–1988) took over the school and ran it to 1988. The school is nowadays owned by Konstskolan Idun Lovén AB and since 2004 the school has its place in Årsta, a suburb in Stockholm.

== Exhibitions ==
Larsson participated in exhibitions, among others in Saint Petersburg 1908, Munich 1909, and in San Francisco 1915. In 1935 Larsson had an exhibition in Konstnärshuset, together with the Swedish artist and designer Arthur Percy (1886–1976). Larsson's fellow artist David Wallin arranged some of his exhibitions in Skänninge, an old built-up area from the medieval period, 5 km from Vallerstad in Östergötland, where Larsson was born.

== Represented ==
- Moderna museet in Stockholm.

== Works in a Sculpture Museum Studio in Vadstena ==
In Vadstena, in Skänningegatan 9, there is a sculpture museum called Gottfrid Larsson gården (Gottfrid Larsson garden), where the visitor can get acquainted with his work. After Larsson's death in 1947 his wife Karen Larsson bought the so-called Möllergården in Skänningegatan 9 in Vadstena. In 1953, she donated the whole garden and the sculpture collection, consisting of 125 sculptures, to Vadstena Municipality. In 1979, the garden was opened to the public and Larsson's many works could be exhibited.

Larsson died on Christmas Eve, December 24, 1947, in Stockholm. He is buried in Vallerstad church cemetery, outside the town Skänninge in Östergötland.

== Artistic works ==
Among his early works are:

- Mörkret flyr ljuset (Darkness Flees the Light), (Paris, 1902), an electrical candelabra;
- Kyssen (The Kiss), bronze;
- Toskanska (Tuscany Woman), marble;
- Carl Robert Lamm and his wife Dora Lamm, portrait busts of Carl Robert Lamm (1856–1938) and his wife Dora Lamm, marble;

From Larsson's stay in Italy (1906–1907) and Paris (1908–1912):

- Gammal florentinare (Old man from Florence), marble;
- Florentinskt original (Florence Character), granite;
- Brutal kraft (Brutal Strength), bust, bronze, these were exhibited in 1912;

Other examples of Larsson's sculptures are:

- Vid källan (By the Spring) and other female sculptures in marble;
- Min moder (My mother), marble;
- Oscar Montelius, black granite, Oscar Montelius (1843–1921), a Swedish archaeologist and custodian of national monuments;

== Public sculptures to look at today ==
- Valsverksarbetare (Workers in a Rolling Mill), monumental group, exhibited in 1909 in the competition about industry monument, was placed in Södra folkparken, Stockholm in 1924;
- Valsverksarbetare (Workers in a Rolling Mill) (1910) in Överums Bruk in Kalmar municipality, Småland;
- Arbetaren (The Worker) (1917), bronze statue in Vasaparken, Stockholm;
- Arbetaren (The Worker) (1917), copy in the factory mill park in Lövstabruk, Uppland;
- Man och kvinna (Man and Woman) (1920);
- Sjöjungfru och sjöhästar (Mermaid and Sea Horses) (1920), fountain in Järnvägsparken in Linköping;
- Såningsmannen (The Sower) (1946), at Östgöta nation in Uppsala University;
- Såningsmannen (The Sower) (1949), at Vallerstad church cemetery in Östergötland;
- and moreover there are some portrait busts and decorative sculptures in Norrköping town hall and granite sculpture in Handelsbanken at Drottninggatan and Kungsgatan.

== Sources ==
- Gottfrid Larsson i Konstnärslexikonett Amanda
- Gottfrid Larsson in Nordisk Familjebok, Uggleupplagan 37, Supplement L – Riksdag/, sidan 85–86, (1925)
- Gottfrid Larsson i Vem är det, Svensk Biografisk Handbok, 1925, sidan 424–425.
- Gottfrid Larsson i Vem är det, Svensk Biografisk Handbok, 1933, sid 479.
- IDUN, Illustrerad Tidning för Kvinnan och Hemmet, grundad av Frithiof Hellberg, torsdagen den 21 november 1907, 12 pdf-sidor, Kvinnohistoriska tidskrifter, Annie Frykholm om Agda Montelius, Gottfrid Larsson och Otto Strandman med flera.
- Gottfrid Larsson i Ancestry 2008-11-21
