= Anna Lindh =

Swedish politician (1957–2003)

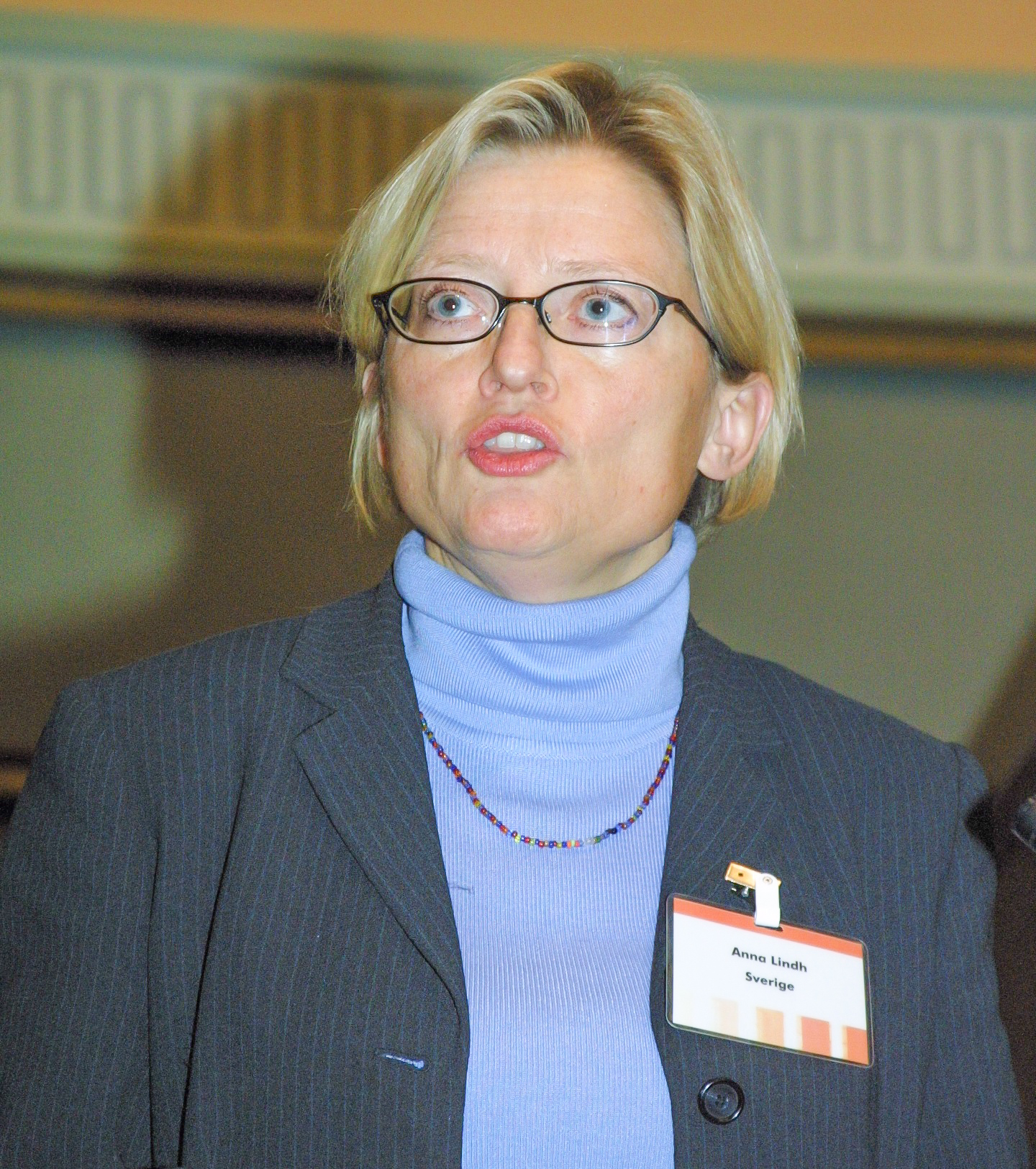
- Lindh in 2002

Minister for Foreign Affairs
- In office 7 October 1998 – 11 September 2003
- Prime Minister: Göran Persson
- Preceded by: Lena Hjelm-Wallén
- Succeeded by: Jan O. Karlsson (Acting)

Minister for the Environment
- In office 7 October 1994 – 7 October 1998
- Prime Minister: Ingvar Carlsson; Göran Persson
- Preceded by: Olof Johansson
- Succeeded by: Kjell Larsson

Member of the Riksdag
- In office 20 September 1998 – 11 September 2003
- In office 19 September 1982 – 15 September 1985
- Constituency: Södermanland County

Personal details
- Born: Ylva Anna Maria Lindh; 19 June 1957 Stockholm, Sweden
- Died: 11 September 2003 (aged 46) Stockholm, Sweden
- Cause of death: Assassination by stabbing
- Resting place: Katarina Church, Stockholm
- Party: Social Democratic Party
- Spouse: Bo Holmberg (m. 1991)
- Children: 2
- Education: Uppsala University
- Anna Lindh's voice Lindh discussing the Treaty of Nice; Recorded 22 January 2001

Ylva Anna Maria Lindh (19 June 1957 – 11 September 2003) was a Swedish politician, diplomat, and lawyer who served as Minister for Foreign Affairs from 1998 until her assassination in 2003. A leading figure of the Swedish Social Democratic Party, Lindh was a Member of the Riksdag representing Södermanland County from 1982 to 1985 and again from 1998 to 2003.

On 10 September 2003, four days before a referendum on replacing the Swedish krona with the euro as currency, Lindh was stabbed by Mijailo Mijailović at the NK department store in central Stockholm; she died the following morning at Karolinska University Hospital. She had been seen as a likely candidate to succeed Göran Persson as Social Democratic party leader.

Her greatest commitment was to international cooperation and solidarity, as well as to environmental issues. She worked on these issues throughout her career, serving as Environment Minister from 1994 to 1998.

== Early life and education ==
Ylva Anna Maria Lindh was born to Staffan (1931–2017), an artist, and Nancy Lindh (1932–2005), a schoolteacher, in Enskede-Årsta, a suburb southeast of Stockholm. She grew up in Enköping. At age 12, she became involved in politics after joining a local branch of the Swedish Social Democratic Youth League, becoming its district chairman when she was 13. She took part in the Swedish movement against the Vietnam War.

Lindh studied at Uppsala University, graduating in 1982 as a Candidate of Law (jur. kand.). The same year, she won election as a Member of the Riksdag (MP) for Södermanland County. In 1984, she became the first woman chairperson of the Swedish Social Democratic Youth League. Her six years as president were marked by a commitment to international affairs (including Nicaragua, Vietnam, South Africa and Palestine) and against the arms race which characterised the Cold War. As Youth League leader, she also notably held an emotional eulogy after the assassination of Olof Palme in 1986.

== Political career ==
Lindh served in the Riksdag from 1982 until 1985, and again from 1998 until her death in 2003. From 1991 to 1994, she was Commissioner of Culture and Environment and the Deputy Mayor of Stockholm. In 1994, after a Social Democratic victory in the election of that year, Prime Minister Ingvar Carlsson appointed her to his cabinet as Minister for the Environment. One of Lindh's legacies was her pioneering work towards European Union legislation on hazardous chemical substances. She also called for the establishment of a common EU strategy against acid rain.

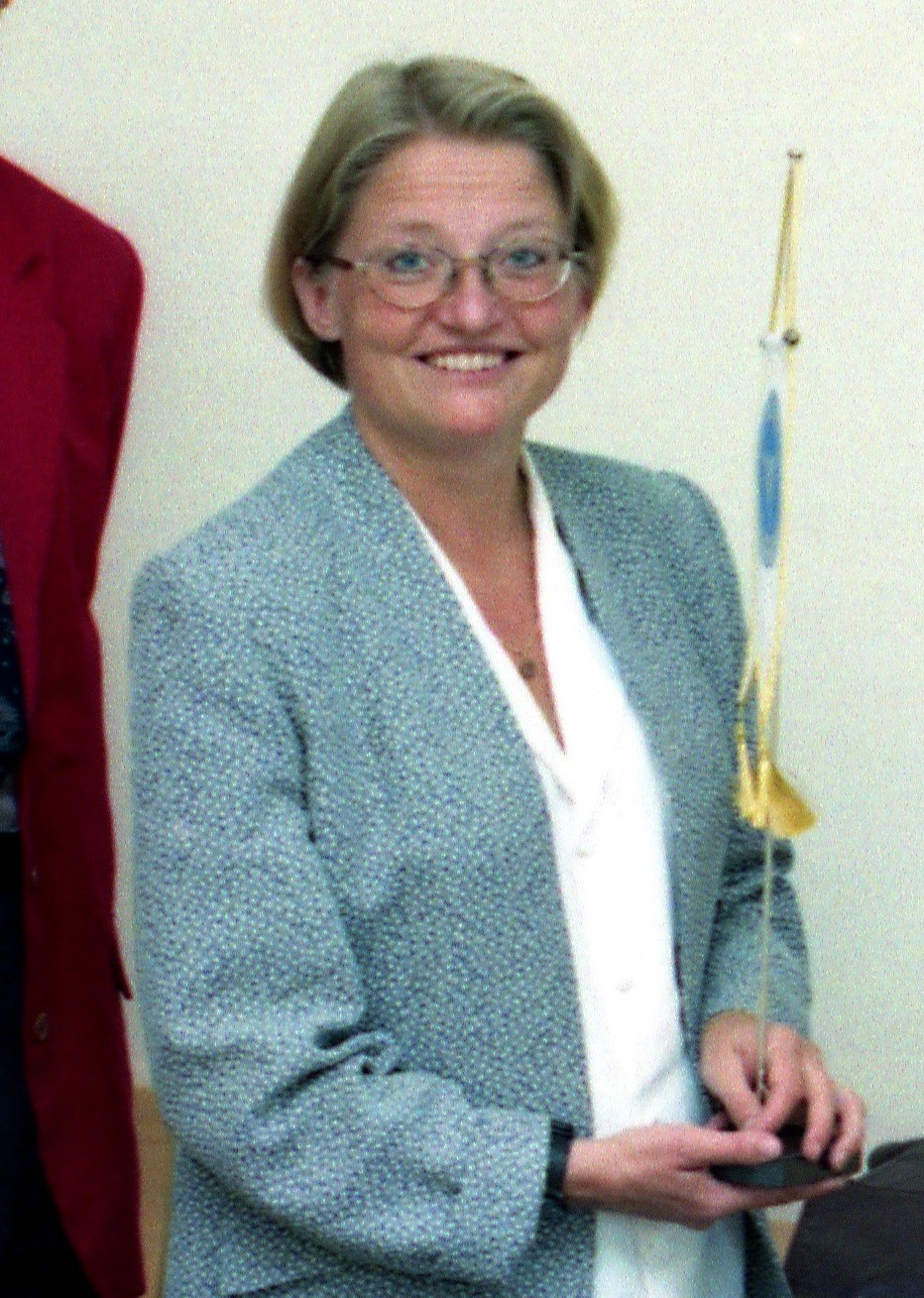
Lindh in 1995

After the 1998 election, Prime Minister Göran Persson appointed Lindh to succeed Lena Hjelm-Wallén as Minister for Foreign Affairs in the new government. Having made influential friends around the world as president of the Swedish Social Democratic Youth League, Lindh ardently supported international cooperation through the United Nations and in the European Union.

A high point in her career occurred during the Swedish presidency of the European Union in early 2001. Lindh served as chairman of the Council of the European Union, responsible for representing the official foreign policy position of the European Union. Travelling with European Union Foreign and Security Policy Spokesman Javier Solana in North Macedonia, during the Kosovo-Macedonian crisis, she negotiated an agreement which averted a civil war in the country.

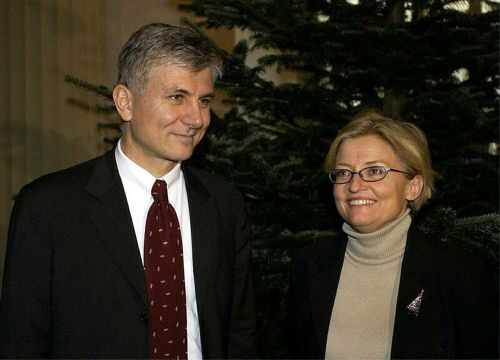
With Prime Minister of Serbia Zoran Đinđić in Stockholm. Lindh was due to meet Đinđić in Belgrade in March 2003, moments before his assassination by sniper. Lindh was stabbed fatally in Stockholm six months after Đinđić's death.

Another talking point in her career was the violent repatriation of Ahmed Agiza and Muhammad al-Zery from Sweden to Egypt, an operation carried out by the US military. According to a 2009 book published by journalist and friend of Lindh Eva Franchell, Göran Persson claimed the US administration would place a trade embargo on the European Union if Sweden did not let the Americans pick up Ahmed Agiza and Muhammad al-Zery on Swedish soil. Persson publicly denied this claim following the book's publication. Lindh had to choose between standing up for human rights and supporting trade relations with the US. She chose the latter and was later extensively criticised for her actions. On 24 May 2004, when the committee against torture at the United Nations' Office of the High Commissioner for Human Rights found that the Government of Sweden had violated its obligations under the Convention against torture in the forced repatriation of Agiza, Lindh had already been murdered.

Lindh criticised the 2003 invasion of Iraq, saying that:

A war being fought without support in the statutes of the United Nations is a major failure.

However, Lindh praised the fall of Saddam Hussein. She advocated greater respect for international law and human rights in the Israeli–Palestinian conflict, criticising Ariel Sharon's Israeli government, but also condemning Palestinian suicide bombings as "atrocities". She argued strongly for an end to Israeli occupation of Palestinian territories; in an interview shortly before her death she said:

Israeli settlement in the West Bank must go; there must be a Palestinian state; Israel must vacate all occupied areas on the West Bank and Gaza Strip and end all extra-territorial executions and attacks on Palestinians.

During the final weeks of her life, as a popular pro-euro politician she was involved in the pro-euro campaign in the 2003 Swedish euro referendum. She was a spokesperson and chair for the yes campaign where she advocated for Sweden to become a member of the Eurozone; her face was on billboards across Sweden the day she was murdered. The referendum was held on 14 September 2003 (three days after her death) and the majority voted not to adopt the euro.

== Personal life ==
Lindh married Bo Holmberg in 1991. Holmberg was Governor of Södermanland (her home constituency for over 20 years). The couple had two sons, Filip and David. Holmberg died in 2010, in part due to long-standing alcohol abuse exacerbated by her death. In 2026, their son David spoke out of the grief the family had endured, including under intense media scrutiny, at the time of the assassination and trial.

== Assassination and aftermath ==
On 10 September 2003, while shopping in the ladies' section of the Nordiska Kompaniet department store in central Stockholm for a televised debate later that night on the referendum about Sweden's adoption of the euro, Lindh was stabbed in the chest, abdomen and arms. At the time, she was not protected by bodyguards from the Swedish Security Service; this proved controversial, given the similarity between Lindh's murder and that of Prime Minister Olof Palme in 1986 (the first murder of a government member in modern Swedish history). Her very public eulogy of Palme, as the chairwoman of the Youth League 17 years earlier, received new attention after her own death by assassin.

She was rushed to Karolinska University Hospital, where she underwent surgery and blood transfusions for over nine hours. Lindh reportedly experienced severe internal bleeding and liver damage; her condition remained grave, although she appeared to have improved immediately after the surgery. An hour later, however, complications necessitated additional surgery; at 05:29 on 11 September 2003, she was pronounced dead. After a private briefing of her relatives and the government (and contradicting news coverage that she was alive in "grave" but "stable" condition), the announcement of her death made headlines across the European Union.

=== Criminal investigation ===
The murderer escaped after the crime; according to eyewitness accounts, his actions appeared deliberate and systematic. A phone number was set up for anyone who might know anything about the crime, and a massive manhunt (centred on Stockholm) was launched in Sweden. After two days, a photo of a man believed to be the murderer, taken by a camera on a floor above the murder scene, was leaked by Swedish newspapers. Several items (pieces of clothing and a knife) believed to be connected with the murder were found outside the department store near a Stockholm metro station. At the crime scene, police obtained a handprint believed to be the killer's. Images of the suspect from the store's surveillance system were released by police and published on 13 and 14 September.

A man was apprehended on 16 September and detained as a suspect on "reasonable grounds" (the lowest level of suspicion), but was released a week later without charge. On 24 September, the police announced that a suspect had been apprehended and arrested at a higher level of suspicion: "probable cause". He was subsequently identified as Mijailo Mijailović (born in Sweden to Serb parents). It was announced that Mijailović's DNA profile matched that of hairs on a baseball cap left at (or near) the scene of the crime, and he resembled the man filmed in the store where Lindh was attacked.

After denying all involvement, Mijailović confessed to the crime on 6 January 2004, providing a full account of the events of 10 September during police questioning; his lawyer Peter Althin stated that it was a "random act" and not politically motivated. He was found guilty in a trial held from 14 to 17 January 2004. After a psychiatric evaluation he was sentenced to life imprisonment on 23 March. On 8 July, an appeals court overturned Mijailović's sentence (after tests concluded he was mentally ill at the time of the murder), and recommended he be transferred to a psychiatric ward. Prosecutors appealed to the Supreme Court of Sweden, which reinstated his sentence to life imprisonment on 2 December of that year. Mijailović renounced his Swedish citizenship, and has unsuccessfully requested to be transferred to Serbia.

Despite Lindh's popularity and the timing of the assassination, the murder was not considered a political act (although a newspaper found a picture of Mijailović listening to Liberal People's Party leader Lars Leijonborg in clothing similar to what he wore during the murder). Mijailović admitted that he found the speech "entertaining", but denied allegations that it influenced his actions. In a 2011 interview with the newspaper Expressen, Mijailović said he had "felt hatred of [all] politicians" at the time, he had been high on a hypnotic drug at the time, and it was "a coincidence" that his victim had been Lindh. Mijailović has received counselling and other support services since his imprisonment.

=== Reaction and legacy ===
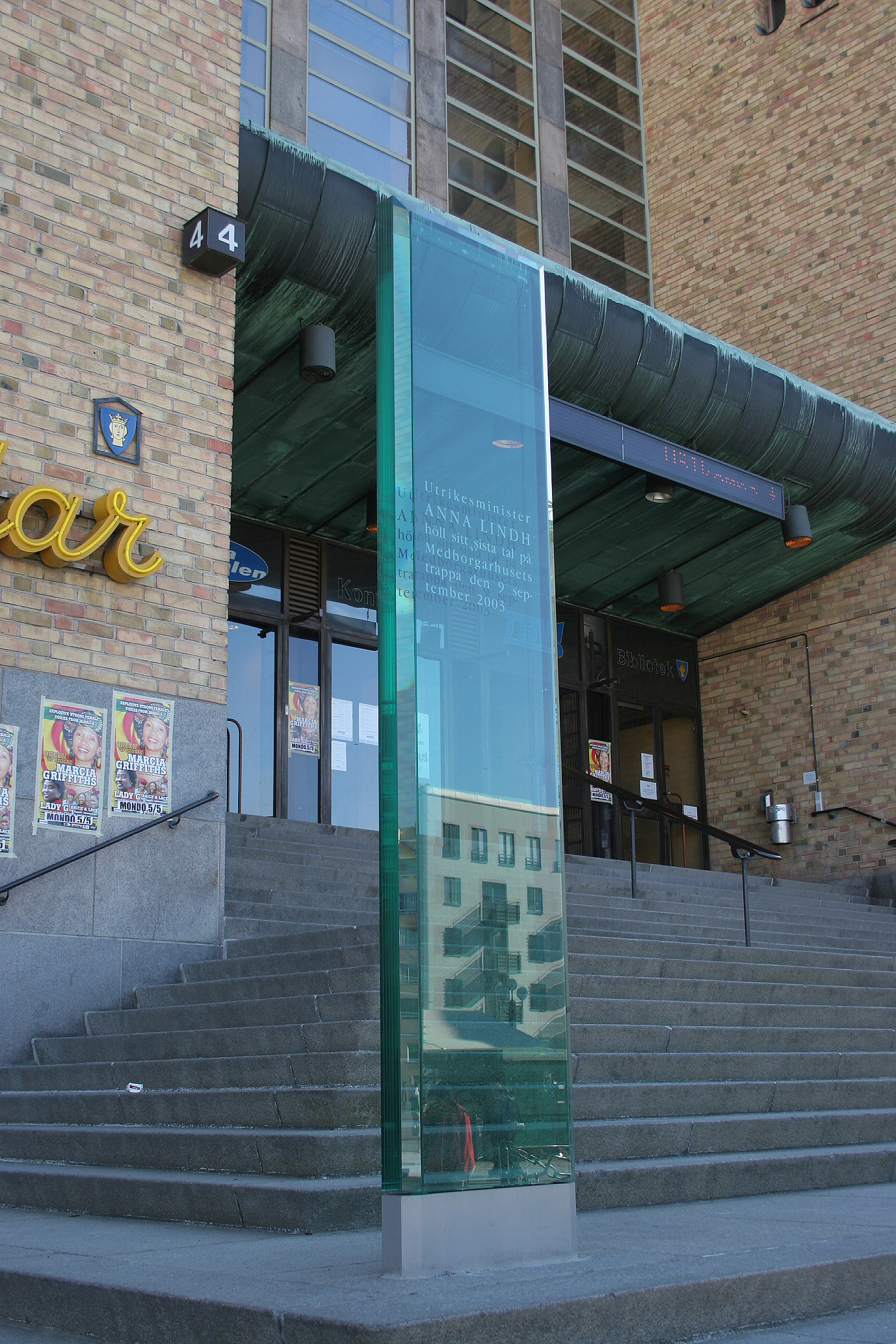
Anna Lindh memorial in Stockholm, marking the spot where she delivered her final speech

Lindh was an outspoken campaigner for Sweden to join the Eurozone in the referendum held on 14 September 2003. After the attack, all euro-campaign events were immediately cancelled. Television campaign advertisements were withdrawn, and all TV stations in Sweden halted commercials from the evening of the 10th through the 11th to help the public broadcasting channels of Sveriges Television report news.

In a meeting on 12 September between Prime Minister Göran Persson and the leaders of the other political parties in the Riksdag, it was decided that information and resources on the referendum's issues would remain fully available but no further political campaigning or debate would take place. Party leaders unanimously pledged support for the ballot as planned and to abide by its result. Despite speculation that sympathy for Lindh could influence voting, the referendum rejected the euro. Following her death, Junior Foreign Affairs Minister Jan O. Karlsson was appointed acting Minister for Foreign Affairs. In October of that year, Laila Freivalds was appointed the successor to Lindh's cabinet post.

Several commemorative gatherings were held for Lindh throughout Sweden and through the Church of Sweden Abroad on 12 and 13 September. One gathering in the centre of Stockholm attracted tens of thousands of mourners. A more formal commemoration was held at Stockholm City Hall on 19 September, at which King of Sweden Carl XVI Gustaf, Prime Minister Göran Persson, Chris Patten, Margot Wallström, European commissioners and the Swedish-speaking Greek Foreign Minister George Papandreou spoke. U.S. Secretary of State Colin Powell was unable to attend due to travel difficulties, but sent condolences. Lindh was buried privately on 20 September at the Church of Ersta in Stockholm; her grave is in the cemetery of nearby Katarina Church. Thousands of roses and candles were placed at Rosenbad and outside the store where she was murdered. Abroad, hundreds of thousands of flowers and candles were left at Swedish embassies and consulates by mourners.

In April 2004, Lindh posthumously received the "Statesman of the Year Award" from the EastWest Institute, a trans-Atlantic think tank that organizes an annual security conference in Brussels. Room 50.4 on the fifth floor of the Justus Lipsius European Council building in Brussels was named the Anna Lindh Room in her honour, and committee room 1A 002 in the Paul Henri Spaak building of the European Parliament in Brussels named the Anna Lindh Room in her memory.

The Anna Lindh Professorship of Practice of Global Leadership and Public Policy at the Harvard Kennedy School at Harvard University, was established in her honour. Human rights advocate Samantha Power was the inaugural appointee in 2006. The library at the Swedish National Defence College (Försvarshögskolan) is known as the Anna Lindh Library in her memory. On 11 September 2013, the tenth anniversary of Lindh's death was commemorated in Sweden.

==== Anna Lindh Prize ====
The Anna Lindh Memorial Fund (Swedish: Anna Lindhs Minnesfond) gives an annual award, the Anna Lindh Prize, to a person or institution with "the courage to fight indifference, prejudice, oppression and injustices in order to promote a good life for all people in an environment marked by respect for human rights." The prize carries an award of SEK 150,000. In addition, the fund makes grants, which "aim to encourage projects in Anna Lindh's spirit", of SEK 25,000 to Swedish individuals. Laureates are: Amira Hass, journalist (Israel, 2004); Tostan and Anna Lindh Association (Senegal, 2005); Tatsiana Revjaka (Belarus, 2006); Khin Ohmar (Myanmar 2008); Mohamed Nasheed (Maldives, 2009); Jean Zaru (Palestine, 2010) Centre for Liberian Assistance (Liberia, 2011); Center for Roma Initiatives (Montenegro, 2012); Madeleine Albright (United States, 2013); Leslee Udwin (United Kingdom, 2015); Svitlana Zalishchuk (Ukraine, 2016) and Mina Dennert (Sweden, 2017).

== See also ==
- Anna Lindh Euro-Mediterranean Foundation for the Dialogue Between Cultures
- Government of Sweden
- Referendums in Sweden

Government offices
| Preceded by Görel Thurdin | Swedish Minister for the Environment; 1994–1998 | Succeeded by Kjell Larsson |
| Preceded by Lena Hjelm-Wallén | Swedish Minister for Foreign Affairs; 1998–2003 | Succeeded by Jan O. Karlsson |
