= Magnus Ek =

Swedish politician (born 1994)

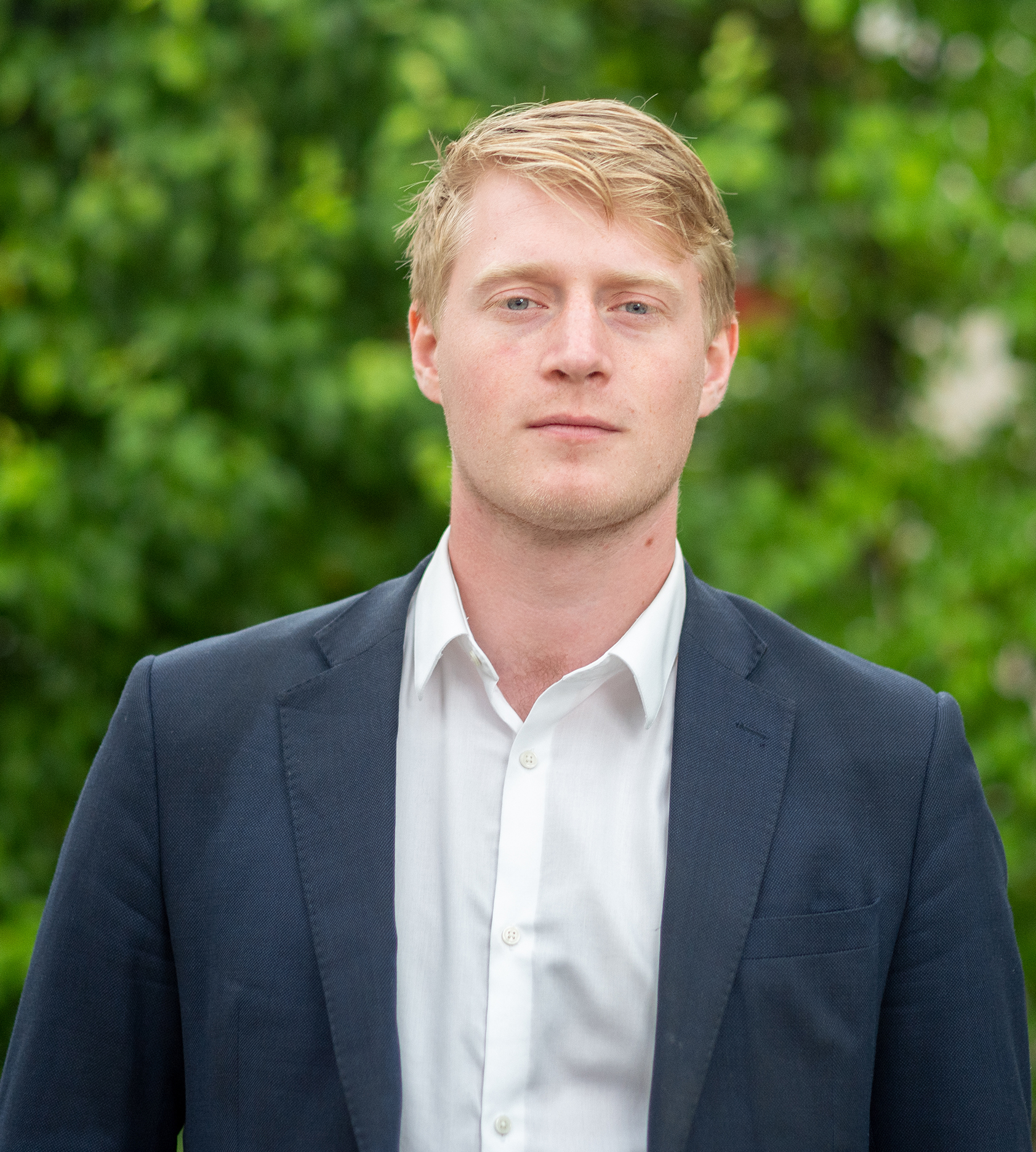
- Magnus Ek in 2019

Member of the Riksdag
- In office 24 September 2018 – 26 September 2022
- Constituency: Östergötland County

Personal details
- Born: 1994 (age 31–32)
- Party: Centre Party
- Parents: Anders Ek (father); Lena Ek (mother)

Magnus Ek (born 1994) is a Swedish politician. He served as a Member of the Riksdag representing the constituency of Östergötland County. He was chairman of the Centre Party Youth from 2015 to 2019.

== Personal life ==
His mother Lena Ek is a former politician. She served as Minister for the Environment from 2011 to 2014.
