= Kjell Larsson =

Swedish politician (1943–2002)

Minister of Environment
- In office 1998–2000
- Prime Minister: Göran Persson
- Preceded by: Anna Lindh
- Succeeded by: Lena Sommestad

Personal details
- Born: 26 March 1943 Gothenburg, Sweden
- Died: 21 December 2002 (aged 59) Stockholm, Sweden
- Party: Swedish Social Democratic Party

Kjell Larsson (26 March 1943 – 21 December 2002) was a Swedish social democrat politician. He held many positions in the social democratic party and was one of the advisors to leading Swedish social democrats, namely Olof Palme and Ingvar Carlsson. He served as the minister of environment for two years between 1998 and 2000.

== Biography ==
Larsson was born in Gothenburg on 26 March 1943. His father was a construction worker.

Larsson started his career as the secretary of the Swedish Construction Workers' Union in 1967. He joined the Social Democratic Party in 1970 and began to work as an analyst on its national board. Between 1973 and 1976 he was the political advisor to Olof Palme. In 1976, Larsson became his speech writer and general political advisor. From 1980 to 1982 he headed the ARE company, the Social Democrats' advertising company.

In 1982, when the Party won the general elections, Larsson was appointed state secretary to Deputy Prime Minister Ingvar Carlsson. In 1996, he was made director-general of the Swedish export credits guarantee board and in 1998, he was appointed as the environment minister to the cabinet led by Prime Minister Göran Persson. In April 2001, Larsson visited US President George W. Bush together with Environment Commissioner Margot Wallström and several other leading politicians to persuade him to confirm the Kyoto climate-change agreement, but their visit was not a success.

In addition to political posts, Larsson served as the head of Table Tennis Association.

Larsson had an operation and retired from politics due to his illness in September 2002. He was succeeded by Lena Sommestad as environment minister. Larsson died at age 59 in Stockholm on 22 December 2002 due to cancer. He had three children.
