= Markus Andersson (artist) =

Swedish painter

Markus Andersson (born 25 February 1968) is a Swedish artist and teacher of art at Medborgarskolan and Folkuniversitetet in Uppsala.

Markus Andersson was educated at Konstskolan Idun Lovén, Heatherley School of Fine Art and has studied under Odd Nerdrum. He runs his own art gallery named Galleri Sörängen, located outside Uppsala. Markus Andersson was awarded the Magnus Laurentius Medici award in the category painting at the Florence Biennale in 2003.

Markus Andersson works primarily in oil and watercolor. His pictures are characterized by Alex Brich as traditional Nordic art with national romantic and political motives, in a naturalistic style depicting animals, nature and people. During the bright time of the year Andersson is engaged preferably to depict marine motifs in the open air, including on the Norwegian east coast and in Bohuslän. Paintings by Andersson have been exhibited at Moderna museet, Louvre, Bruno Liljefors studio, Florence biennale, Kitsch biennale and several galleries and museums in Sweden, Norway and Estonia. His art is represented at Sweden's Embassy in Tallinn and Swedish St Michael's Church in Tallinn.

== The 2006 Modern Exhibition ==
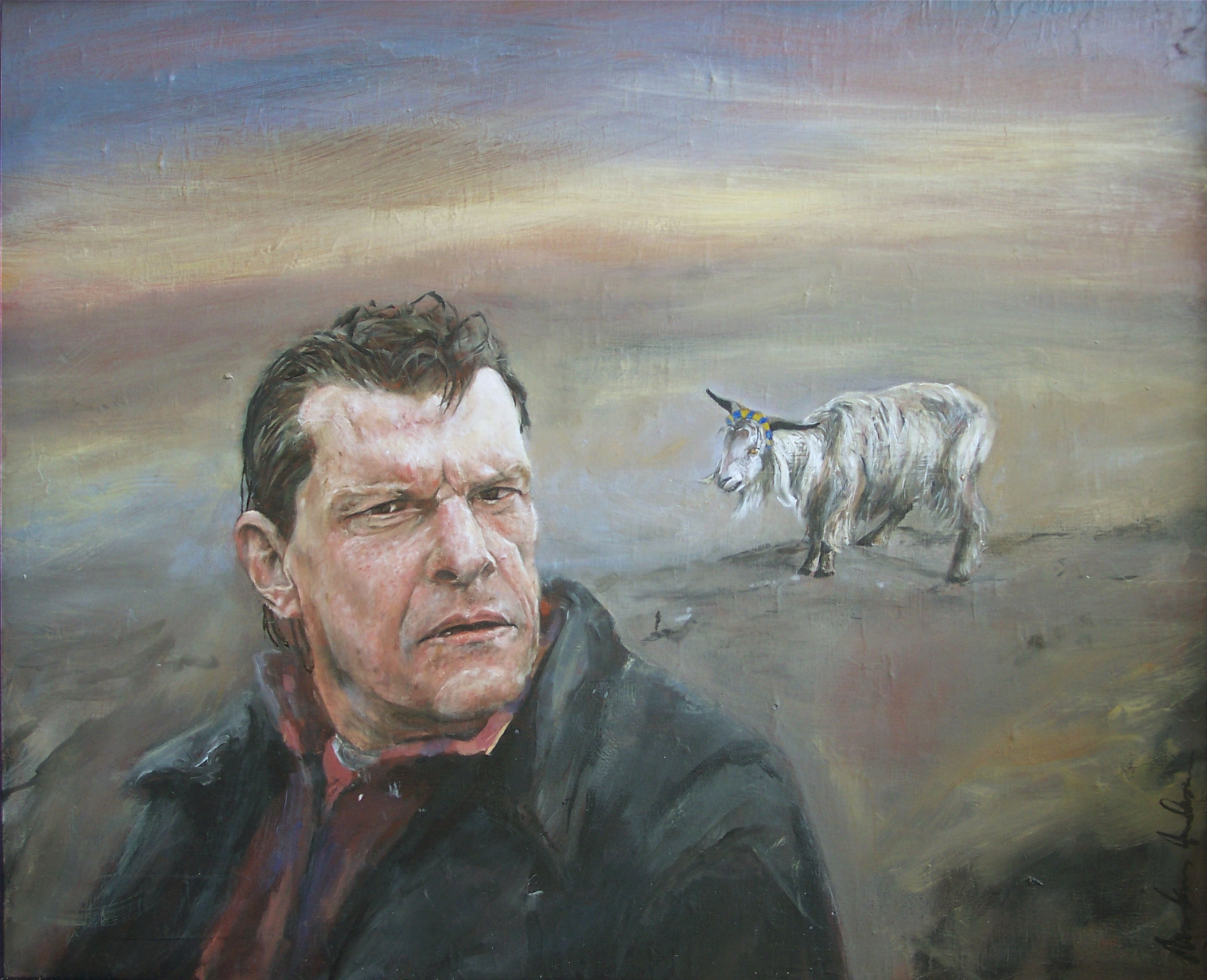
Svenska syndabockar (2010)

The artist Dorinel Marc offered his place at Moderna museet's Modern exhibition 2006 to Andersson, who exhibited a number of oil paintings with natural motifs and contemporary images. Among other things, portraits of Christer Pettersson, Daniel Wretström, Pim Fortuyn, Theo van Gogh and Mijailo Mijailovic were shown.

=== Reactions ===
The work that attracted the most attention among the media and the public in connection with the exhibition at Moderna museet 2006 was a painting depicting Christer Pettersson and a scapegoat, titled Swedish scapegoats. The painting was an expression of the scapegoat and of William Holman Hunt's painting "The Scapegoat". When Markus Andersson painted Swedish scapegoats he used a photograph as a model during the work on the part of the board that representsChrister Pettersson. The author of the photograph, the press photographer Jonas Lemberg, later took proceedings against Markus Andersson and claimed that he was guilty of copyright infringement. The dispute was settled to Markus Andersson's advantage in February 2017, when the Supreme Court ruled that Swedish scapegoats were a new and independent work that did not infringe upon copyright to the photo.

== Gallery ==
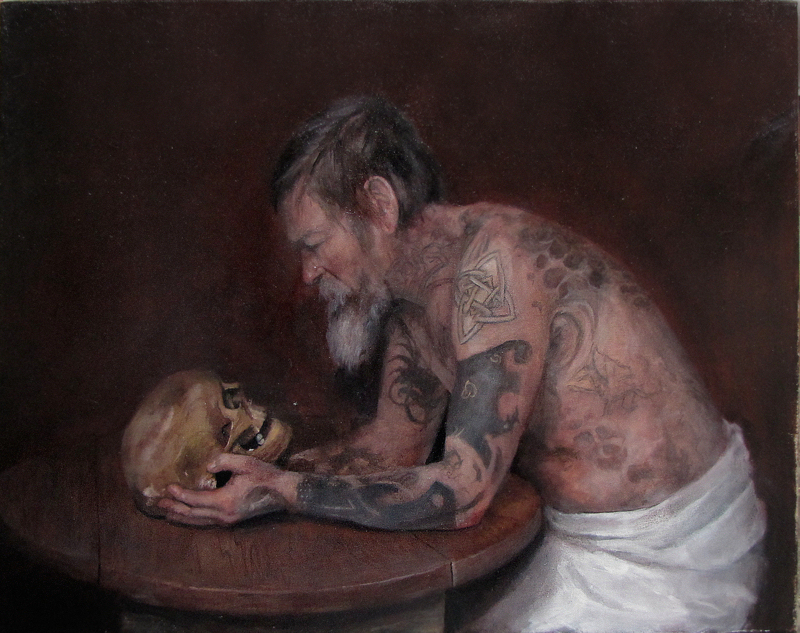
Catharsis

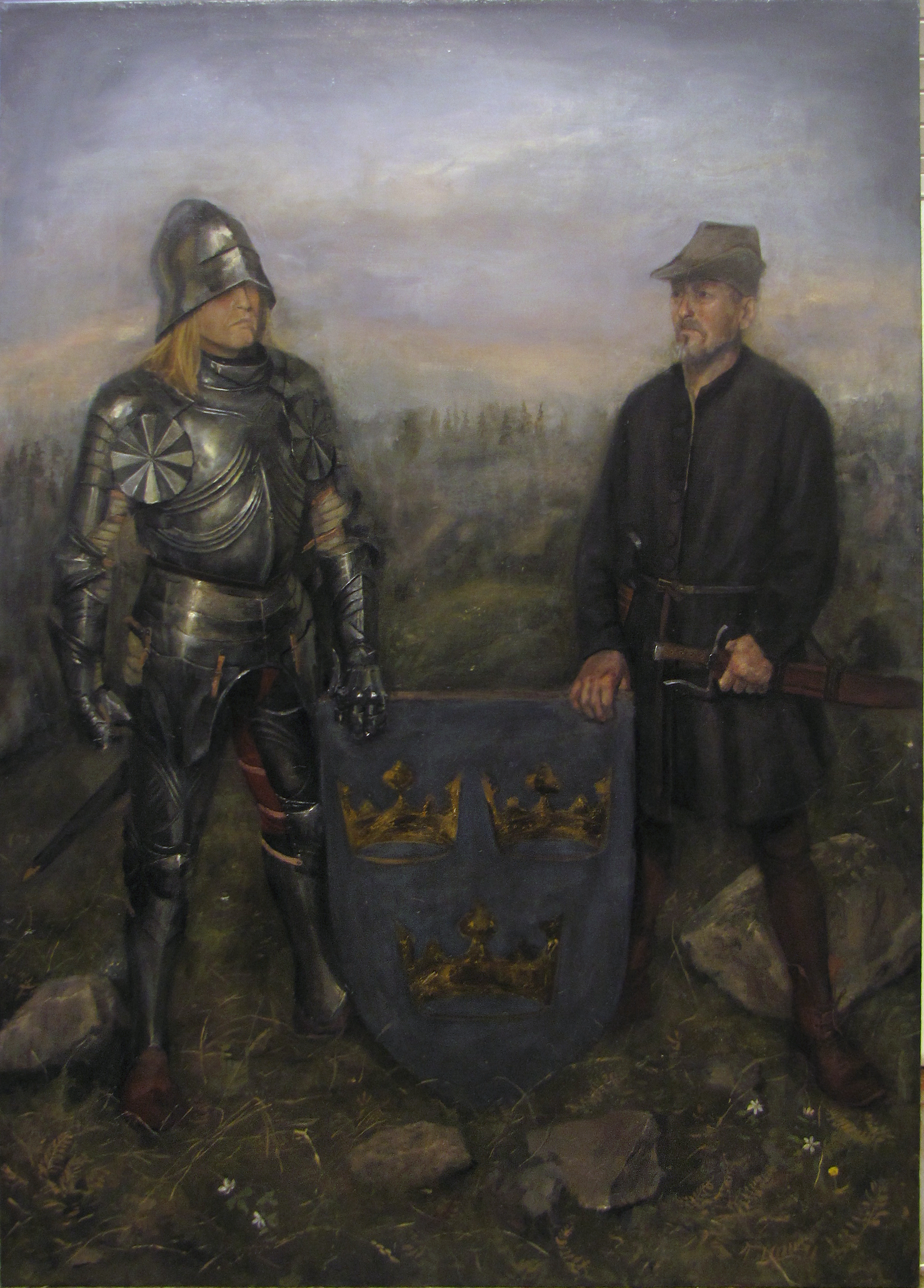
Equality

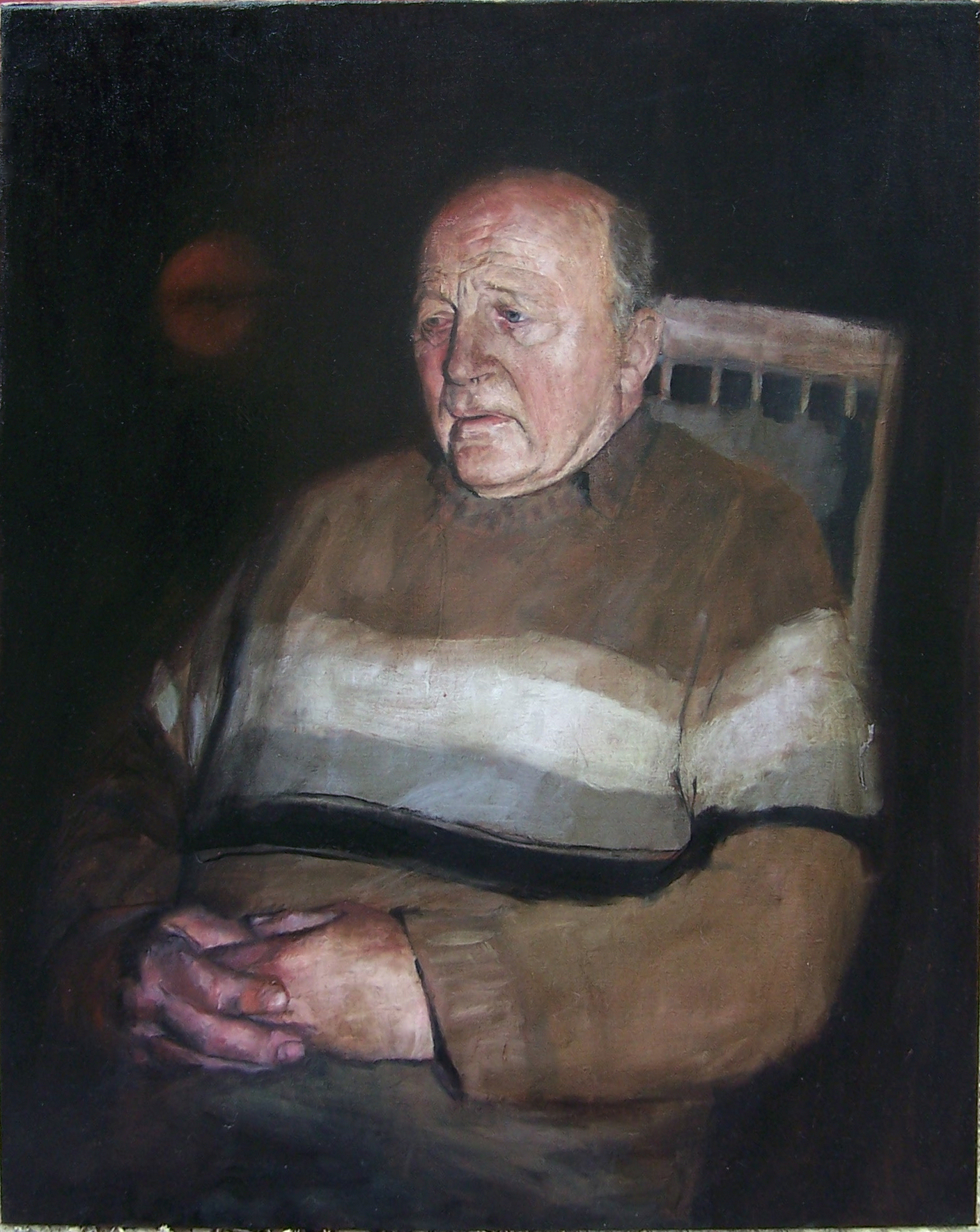
The last witness

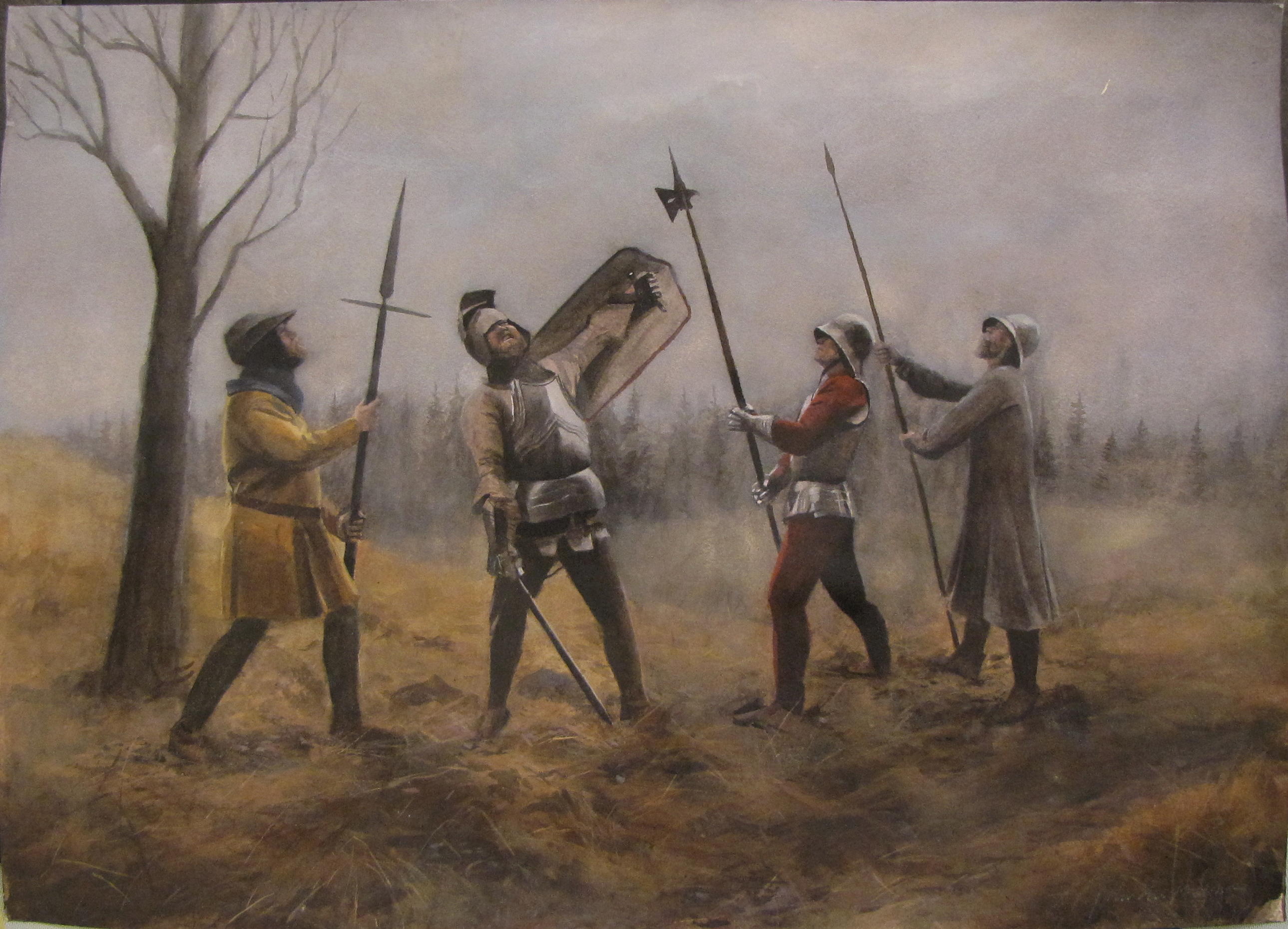
Anger at the gods
