= Markus Andersson =

Markus Andersson may refer to:

- Markus Andersson (artist) (born 1968), Swedish artist and teacher of art
- Markus Andersson (cyclist) (born 1973), Swedish cylist

== See also ==
- Markus Anderson (born 2003), American soccer player
