= Birgitta Dahl =

Swedish politician (1937–2024)

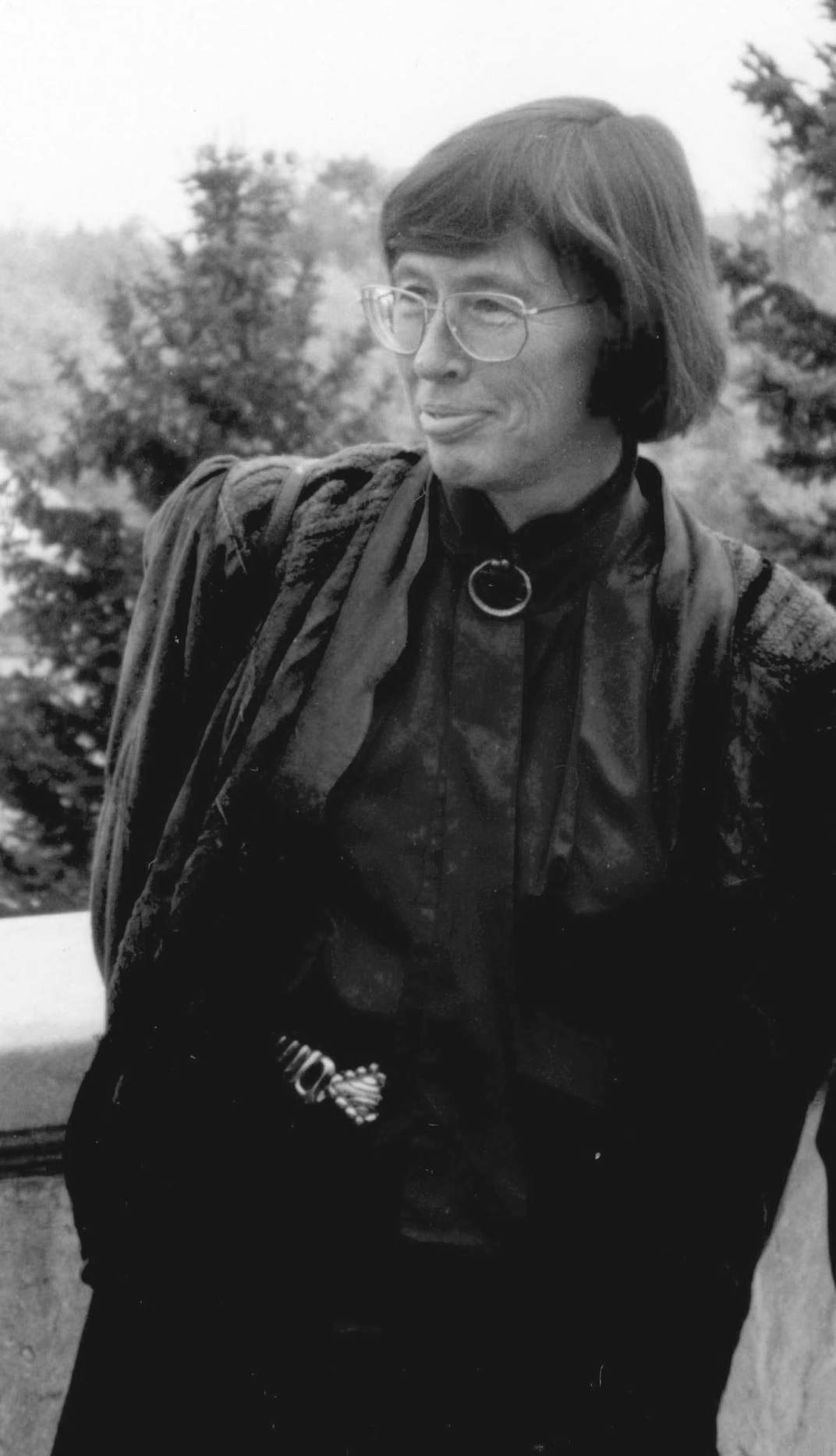
- Dahl in 1990

Speaker of the Riksdag
- In office 3 October 1994 – 30 September 2002
- Monarch: Carl XVI Gustaf
- Preceded by: Ingegerd Troedsson
- Succeeded by: Björn von Sydow

Minister for the Environment
- In office 12 March 1986 – 4 October 1991
- Prime Minister: Ingvar Carlsson
- Preceded by: Ingvar Carlsson
- Succeeded by: Olof Johansson

Minister for Energy
- In office 8 October 1982 – 27 February 1990
- Prime Minister: Olof Palme; Ingvar Carlsson
- Preceded by: Ingemar Eliasson
- Succeeded by: Rune Molin

Member of the Riksdag
- In office 1969–2002

Personal details
- Born: 20 September 1937 Härryda, Sweden
- Died: 26 November 2024 (aged 87)
- Party: Social Democrat
- Education: Uppsala University
- Awards: Illis quorum 2003

Rut Birgitta Dahl (20 September 1937 – 26 November 2024) was a Swedish politician of the Social Democratic Party. Dahl was a Member of Parliament from 1969 to 2002. She served as Minister for Energy from 1982 to 1990, as Minister for the Environment from 1986 to 1991, and as Speaker of the Parliament from 1994 to 2002. She was the chairman of the Swedish section of the United Nations Children's Fund (UNICEF) between 2005 and 2011.

== Education and early career ==
Birgitta Dahl was born in Råda, Härryda Municipality, Västra Götaland County on 20 September 1937. She earned a B.A. at Uppsala University in 1960. During her studies she was politically active in the Uppsala Student Union.

She worked as a senior administrative officer at the Swedish International Development Cooperation Agency from 1965 to 1982, as a course assistant at the Swedish North Africa Institute from 1964 to 1965, at the Dag Hammarskjöld Foundation from 1965 to 1967.

== Member of Parliament ==
Dahl served as a Member of Parliament from 1969 to 2002 (until 1970 as a member of the lower house).

The 1969 elections resulted in the election of many young MPs which was then uncommon, and Dahl belonged to the first representatives of the Protests of 1968 and second-wave feminism to be elected to the Parliament. In 1969, women were still in the minority and the majority of MPs were still mainly old men, and Dahl attracted some controversy with her miniskirt and the fact that she was an unwed mother.

In 1975, Dahl motioned for the establishment of public day care and to enlarge the existing day care system to make it possible to all citizens to access it, which would make it more possible for women to combine family and work. This was a major reform within the women's movement, and was finally approved by Parliament in 1985.

For a period of several years, Dahl worked for a reform of parental leave, so that it could be equally shared between the parents regardless of gender, instead of being reserved for mothers. This was a major reform of the parental leave system, and it was finally approved by Parliament in 1974.

Dahl was a leading figure behind the reform of child corporal punishment laws, in which parents were outlawed from beating their children in 1979.

Aside from motioning for new laws, Dahl worked to implement the 1965 law against rape within marriage. While rape within marriage had been banned in 1965, the law had not been used in practice, and no one was sentenced for the crime until 1984. Dahl worked for the already existing law to be made use of.

== Khmer Rouge controversy ==
From 1971 to 1977, Dahl was chairman of the Swedish Committee for Vietnam (from 1975 known as the Swedish Committee for Vietnam, Laos and Cambodia). This was a time period with strong sympathy in Swedish society for Vietnam and resistance toward American involvement in South East Asia during the Vietnam war.

During the period of 1975 to 1979, when Cambodia was ruled by the government of Pol Pot and his Khmer Rouge party, approximately 1.7 million Cambodians were killed. Dahl created controversy when she refused to believe the reports of atrocities committed by the Khmer Rouge regime. In 1976, Dahl participated in a debate on Sveriges Radio about the situation in Cambodia, where she said, among other things, that: "It was completely necessary to evacuate Phnom Penh. It was necessary to rapidly start the production of provisions and it would require large sacrifices from the population. [...] But that's not what currently is our problem. The problem is that we really don't have knowledge, direct testimonies, in order to reject all lies that are spread by the enemies of Cambodia". Dahl reiterated these views in an article in the journal Vietnam Nu (published by the Swedish Committee for Vietnam, Laos and Cambodia) in 1977.

After the end of the Khmer Rouge regime in 1979 following the Vietnamese invasion, these atrocities were confirmed.

== Cabinet Minister ==
From 1980 to 1981, Dahl served as a Swedish delegate to the United Nations.

In the 1980 Swedish nuclear power referendum, she was one of the leaders of the winning alternative, the Linje 2, which proposed to successively phase out nuclear power, but with care. When the Social Democratic Party won the 1982 Swedish general election, she was appointed Minister for Energy. She first served in the Cabinet of Olof Palme. In 1986, Palme's successor Ingvar Carlsson let her keep her position as Minister for Energy, and also gave her the post of Minister for the Environment.

As Minister for Energy, Dahl introduced the Lagen om kärnteknisk verksamhet ('Law of Energy Technological Activity'), which was implemented in 1984 and banned any new establishment of nuclear power reactors in Sweden, but allowed research and export of nuclear power. As Minister for the Environment, she banned the use of chlorofluorocarbon, which had previously been common.

As Minister, she defended the Linje 2 of the 1980 Swedish nuclear power referendum, which was to phase out nuclear power slowly by investing in alternative energy such as carbon and natural gas. After intense campaigns during her time in office, Dahl secured support in Parliament to shut down two nuclear power reactors. This decision was supported by a large majority in Parliament from the Social Democrats, the Communists, the Greens and the Centre Party, and had the support by Prime Minister Ingvar Carlsson, and Minister of Finance Kjell-Olof Feldt. Dahl publicly described this decision as irrevocable. However, the decision was met with opposition and after an intense lobbying campaign, the decision was retracted in 1989. This undermined Dahl's position, and in January 1990, she was replaced as Minister for Energy by Rune Molin, who supported nuclear power. She kept the post of Minister for the Environment until the election in 1991, which was won by the opposition. On April 28, 1986, while Minister for the Environment, following the detection of abnormal radiation levels by personnel at the Forsmark nuclear power plant (not attributable to Swedish plants) and when the soviet authorities were still maintaining the utmost secrecy regarding the accident at reactor 4 at the Chernobyl nuclear power plant, she released a statement stating that anyone withholding information regarding a radiation leak was violating international regulations and agreements. Following this statement, unable to keep the news under wraps any longer, that same evening at 9:00 p.m., the soviet media released a TASS statement which, while revealing that an accident had occurred at the Chernobyl nuclear power plant, underestimated its severity and overestimated the level of control the authorities had over the situation.

== Speaker of the Parliament ==
After the election of 1994, Dahl was appointed Speaker of the Parliament, a post she kept until 2002. She was the second woman in Sweden to serve as such. The Elections of 1994 resulted in the Parliament of Sweden becoming the most gender equal parliament in the world. As Speaker, Dahl introduced regulations in the Parliament to stop any form of sexual harassment.

=== Recrimination over Cambodia ===
When Dahl was appointed Speaker of the Parliament in 1994, Per Ahlmark questioned her appropriateness to the office due to her past statements about the Khmer Rouge regime, in his book The Open Sore (Swedish: Det öppna såret). In the debate that ensued, Dahl made a public apology in Dagens Nyheter, in which she wrote: "The problem was that I – and others – at the same time yet believed that much of what had been written about Cambodia were lies and speculation. We believed – incorrectly – that it was part of the propaganda to accuse the new regime in Cambodia of even worse crimes that had previously been committed. I also had a hard time imagining that something as shocking could be true. Therefore, there are some statements by me that I deeply regret. Ever since the terrible truth became clear to me, I've been in pain that I didn't grasp and repudiate the cruelties of the Pol Pot regime quickly enough."

== Personal life and death ==
Dahl was first married to Bengt Kettner, divorced, and was secondly married to Enn Kokk from 1986 until his death in 2019. She had three children. One of her daughters, Anna Kettner, is also a former Social Democratic politician.

Dahl died from heart failure on 26 November 2024, at the age of 87.

== Awards ==
- (Sweden) Illis quorum (2003)
- Grand Decoration of Honour in Gold with Sash for Services to the Republic of Austria (2002)

Political offices
Preceded by Ingemar Eliasson	Minister for Energy; 1982–1990	Succeeded by Rune Molin
Preceded by Ingvar Carlsson	Minister for the Environment; 1986–1991	Succeeded by Olof Johansson
Preceded by Ingegerd Troedsson	Speaker of the Riksdag; 1994–2002	Succeeded by Björn von Sydow
