= Minister for the Environment (Sweden) =

Swedish cabinet minister

Minister for Climate and the Environment
- Statsråd
- Lesser coat of arms of Sweden

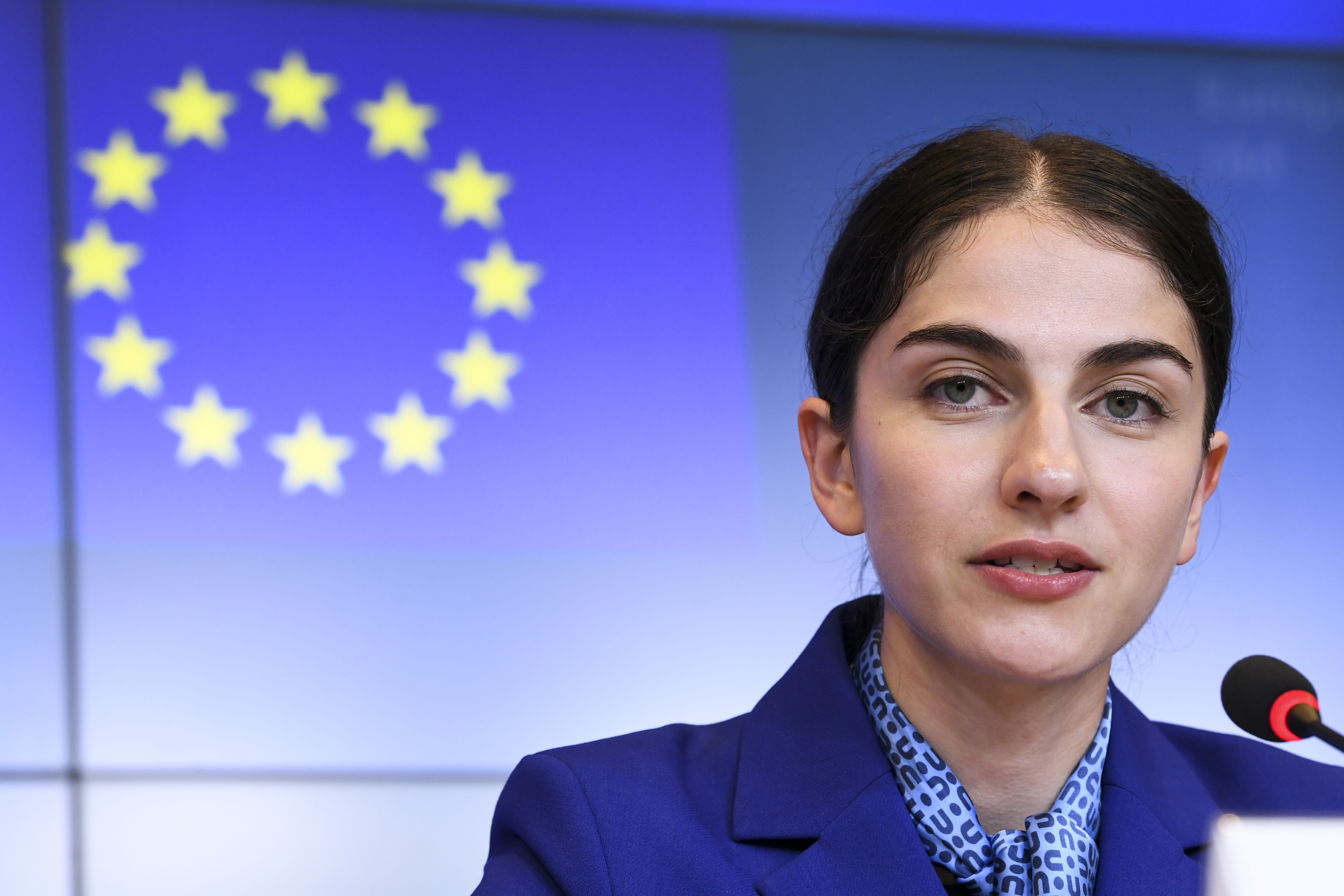
- Incumbent; Romina Pourmokhtari since 18 October 2022
- Member of: The Government
- Appointer: The Prime Minister
- Inaugural holder: Ingvar Carlsson
- Formation: 7 October 1985
- Website: Minister for Climate and the Environment

The Minister for Climate and the Environment, (Swedish: klimat- och miljöminister), formally cabinet minister of the Ministry of Climate and Enterprise, is a member and minister of the Government of Sweden and is appointed by the Prime Minister. The minister is responsible for policies related to natural environment, climate and the overall responsibility for coordinating the work on sustainable development.

The office was founded in 1985, and its first holder was Ingvar Carlsson. In 1987, the Ministry of the Environment was formed with Birgitta Dahl becoming the first head of the ministry. In 2022, the Ministry of the Environment was merged into the Ministry of Enterprise and Innovation, which in turn changed its name to the Ministry of Climate and Enterprise.

Since 2014 the title of Minister for Climate have added to the Minister for the Environment, except for the years between 2016 and 2019 when Isabella Lövin held title along with being Minister for International Development Cooperation.

== List of ministers ==
=== Environment (1985–present) ===
Color key

Independent Social Democrats Moderate Centre Left Liberals Christian Democrats Green Sweden Democrats

No.	Portrait	Minister (Born–Died)	Title	Tenure			Political party	Prime Minister
No.	Portrait	Minister (Born–Died)	Title	Took office	Left office	Duration	Political party	Prime Minister
1	Ingvar Carlsson	Ingvar Carlsson (born 1934)	Minister for the Environment	7 October 1985	28 February 1986	144 days	Social Democrats	Olof Palme (S)
2	Birgitta Dahl	Birgitta Dahl (1937–2024)	Minister for the Environment	12 March 1986	4 October 1991	5 years, 206 days	Social Democrats	Ingvar Carlsson (S)
3	Olof Johansson	Olof Johansson (born 1937)	Minister for the Environment	4 October 1991	16 June 1994	2 years, 255 days	Centre	Carl Bildt (M)
4	Görel Thurdin	Görel Thurdin (born 1942)	Minister for the Environment	16 June 1994	2 October 1994	108 days	Centre	Carl Bildt (M)
–	Karl Erik Olsson	Karl Erik Olsson (1938–2021); Acting	Minister for the Environment	2 October 1994	7 October 1994	5 days	Centre	Carl Bildt (M)
5	Anna Lindh	Anna Lindh (1957–2003)	Minister for the Environment	7 October 1994	7 October 1998	4 years, 0 days	Social Democrats	Ingvar Carlsson (S) (1994 – 1996); Göran Persson (S) (1996 – 1998)
6	Kjell Larsson	Kjell Larsson (1943–2002)	Minister for the Environment	7 October 1998	21 October 2002	4 years, 14 days	Social Democrats	Göran Persson (S)
7	Lena Sommestad	Lena Sommestad (born 1957)	Minister for the Environment	21 October 2002	31 October 2004	2 years, 10 days	Social Democrats	Göran Persson (S)
8	Mona Sahlin	Mona Sahlin (born 1957)	Minister for the Environment	1 November 2004	6 October 2006	1 year, 339 days	Social Democrats	Göran Persson (S)
9	Andreas Carlgren	Andreas Carlgren (born 1958)	Minister for the Environment	6 October 2006	29 September 2011	4 years, 358 days	Centre	Fredrik Reinfeldt (M)
10	Lena Ek	Lena Ek (born 1958)	Minister for the Environment	29 September 2011	3 October 2014	3 years, 4 days	Centre	Fredrik Reinfeldt (M)
11	Åsa Romson	Åsa Romson (born 1972)	Minister for Climate and the Environment	3 October 2014	25 May 2016	1 year, 235 days	Green	Stefan Löfven (S)
12	Karolina Skog	Karolina Skog (born 1976)	Minister for the Environment	25 May 2016	21 January 2019	2 years, 241 days	Green	Stefan Löfven (S)
13	Isabella Lövin	Isabella Lövin (born 1963)	Minister for Climate and the Environment	21 January 2019	5 February 2021	2 years, 15 days	Green	Stefan Löfven (S)
14	Per Bolund	Per Bolund (born 1971)	Minister for Climate and the Environment	5 February 2021	30 November 2021	298 days	Green	Stefan Löfven (S)
15	Annika Strandhäll	Annika Strandhäll (born 1975)	Minister for Climate and the Environment	30 November 2021	18 October 2022	322 days	Social Democrats	Magdalena Andersson (S)
16	Romina Pourmokhtari	Romina Pourmokhtari (born 1995)	Minister for Climate and the Environment	18 October 2022	Incumbent	3 years, 347 days	Liberals	Ulf Kristersson (M)

=== Climate (2016–2019) ===
Since the title of Minister for Climate started to be used in 2014, all Ministers for the Environment have held the title except during the years between 2016 and 2019.

No.	Portrait	Name	Title	Took office	Left office	Time in office	Party	Prime Minister
1	Isabella Lövin	Isabella Lövin (born 1963)	Minister for Climate and International Development; Cooperation	25 May 2016	21 January 2019	2 years, 241 days	Green	Stefan Löfven (S)

== See also ==
- Ministry for the Environment
- Government of Sweden
