= Lovens =

Lovens may refer to:

- Loven, Switzerland, a former municipality now part of La Brillaz in the canton of Fribourg
- Lovens Gjed (born 1995), a Haitian-American entrepreneur
- Paul Lovens (born 1949), a German jazz musician

== See also ==
- Loven (disambiguation)
