= Lena Ek =

Swedish politician (born 1958)

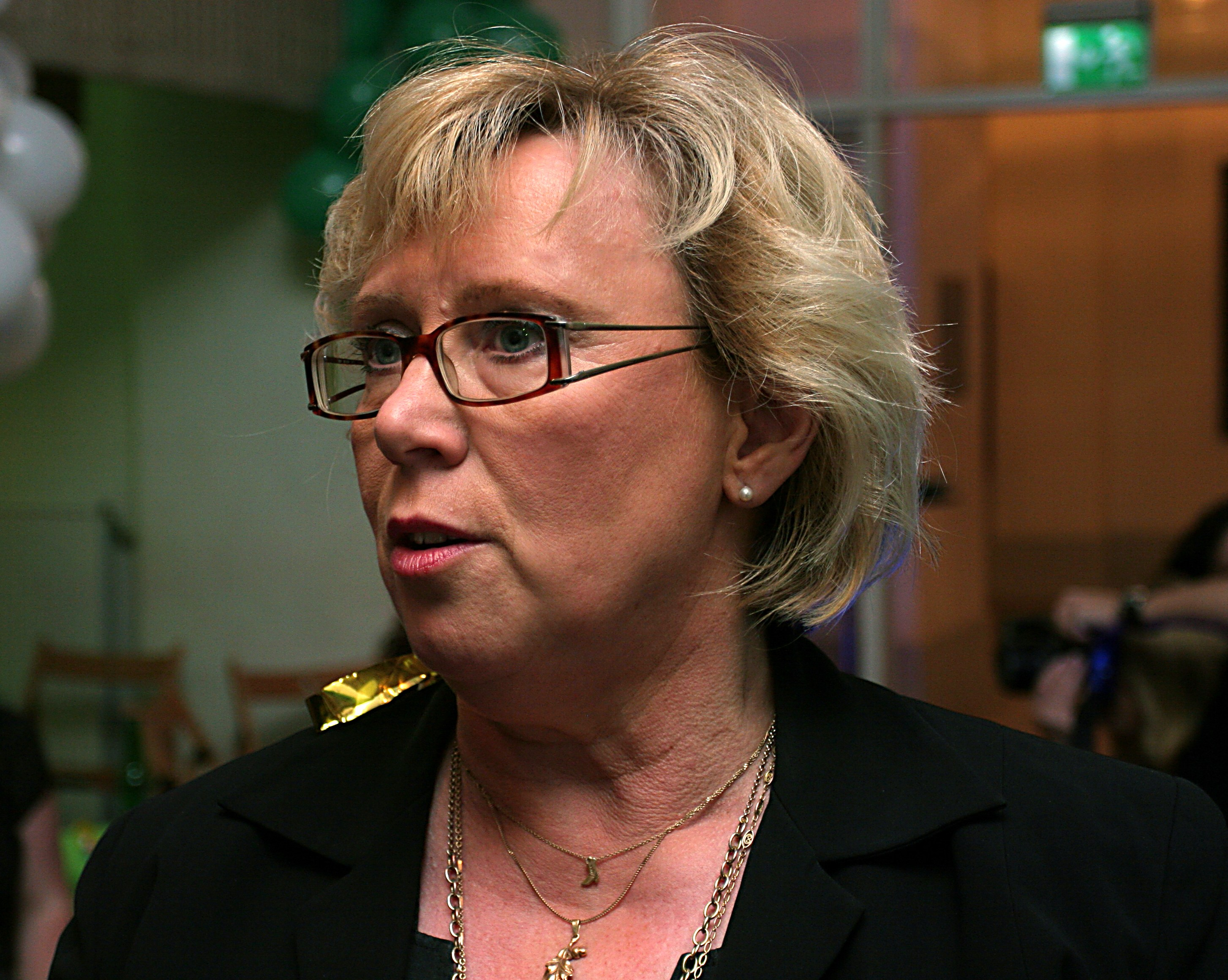

Minister for the Environment
- In office 29 September 2011 – 3 October 2014
- Prime Minister: Fredrik Reinfeldt
- Preceded by: Andreas Carlgren
- Succeeded by: Åsa Romson

Personal details
- Born: 16 January 1958 (age 68) Mönsterås, Sweden
- Party: Centre Party
- Spouse: Anders Ek
- Children: 4, including Magnus Ek
- Education: Lund University

Lena Ek (born 16 January 1958) is a Swedish politician who served as Minister for the Environment from 2011 to 2014. She is a former Member of the European Parliament and Member of the Riksdag. She is a member of the Centre Party, part of the Alliance of Liberals and Democrats for Europe.

She sat on the European Parliament's Committee on Industry, Research and Energy. She was also a substitute for the Committee on Women's Rights and Gender Equality and the Committee on the Environment, Public Health and Food Safety, and a member of the delegation to the ACP-EU Joint Parliamentary Assembly.

After leaving parliament in 2015, Ek was appointed as the government coordinator for the European Spallation Source.

Political offices
Preceded by Andreas Carlgren	Minister for the Environment; 2011–2014	Succeeded by Åsa Romson
