= Annelie Wallin =

Swedish artist

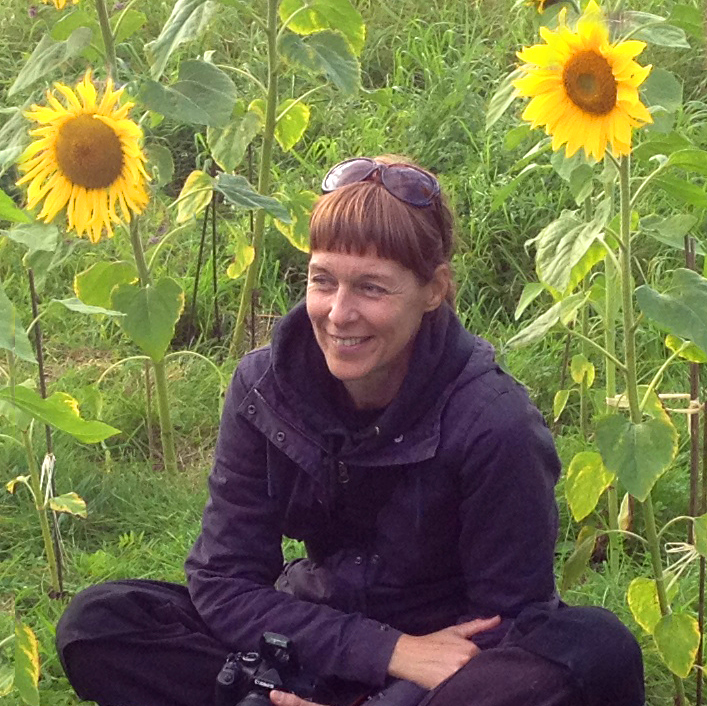
Annelie Wallin with her artwork "Sunflower field in Huvudsta" (2012)

Annelie Wallin (born 16 May 1962) is a Swedish artist.

== Biography ==
Annelie Wallin studied at the Nyckelviksskolan in Stockholm from 1984–1985, Konstskolan Idun Lovén from 1985–1987, and the Royal Institute of Art in Stockholm from 1989–1994.

Annelie Wallin made a name for herself as an artist in the 1990s with a series of notable installations where she built monumental sculptures of everyday objects such as tables and cabinets. Questions about identity were a central theme in her early art, and she explored traditional materials such as diabase and bronze, along with more volatile materials such as yogurt, coffee and wax.

During the 2000s, many of Wallin's works were about the artistic process, where the works often had a performative character and the artist's work was documented and mapped in a discussion of materiality and value, as in the work "Calendar 2006". From the 2010s, her art became increasingly relational and activist, bringing her long-standing environmental commitment to the art. Through a series of actions in the public sphere, she explored the limits of ownership, individual freedom and collective responsibility. In her later work, nature has literally invaded the gallery space, and become a central material; a mycological process, which methodically meanders, grows, waves and lives.

An important part of her art is art in the public space, here she mixes different materials, from classic sculptures in stone, bronze and concrete as in her public artwork "Meeting place" (2011–2012) for the city of Solna, to more technically complex light sculptures such as "Ikaros Vingar" in Idrottshuset in Jönköping, and "Strömmar" in the Åsikten1 neighborhood in Uppsala. She has also carried out a number of art actions in collaboration with the public such as "Sunflower field in Huvudsta" (2012) and "Share garden" in Anderstorp (together with Malin Lobell 2014–2016). Her work is also represented at a number of public institutions, and she has exhibited extensively in Sweden and internationally.

Annelie Wallin is married to civil engineer Bo Bergman. They have two sons together. She has also been active in the artist-run ID:I gallery.
