= Olof Johansson =

Swedish politician (born 1937)

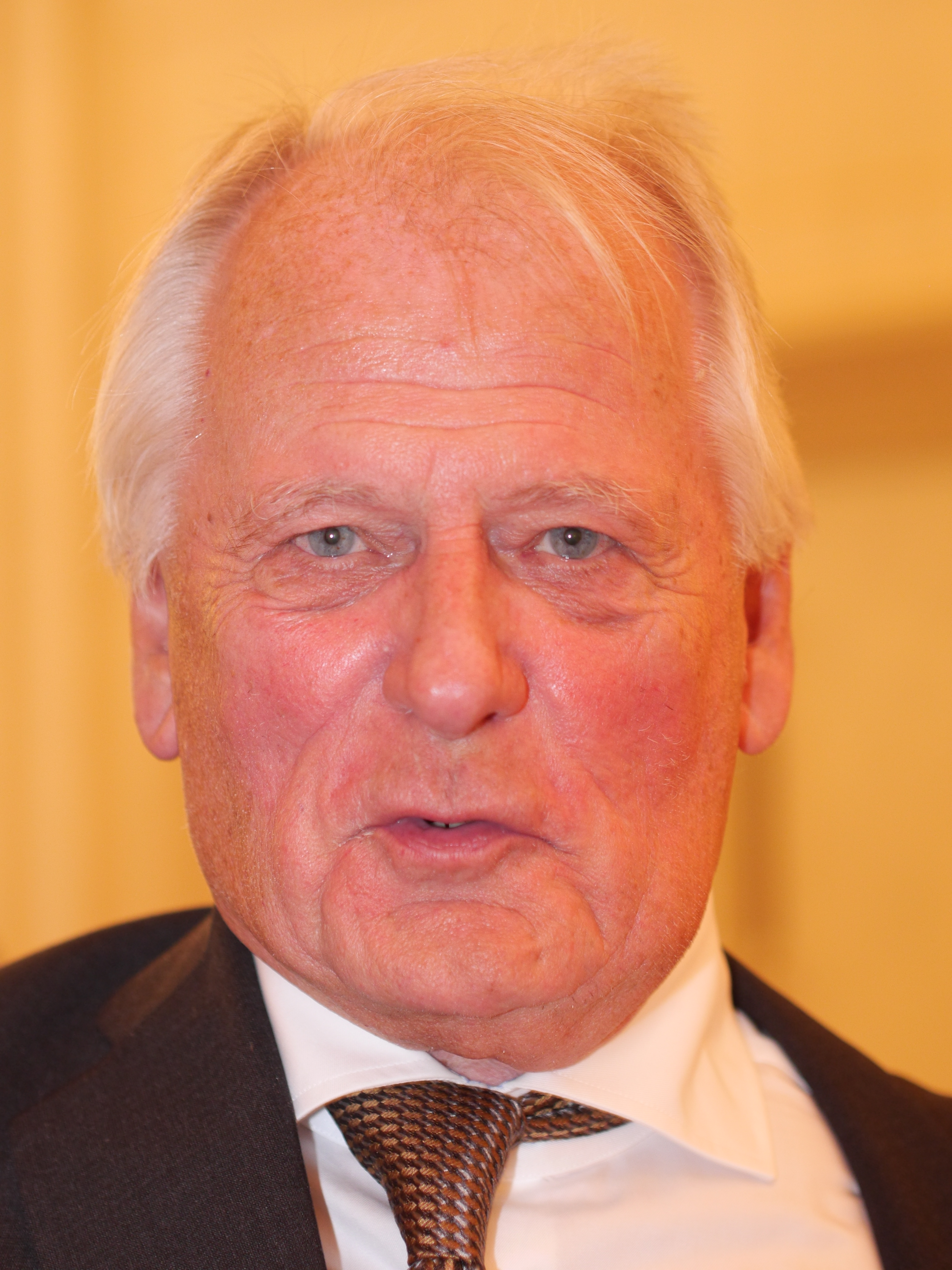
- Johansson in 2016

Minister for Energy
- In office 8 October 1976 – 18 October 1978
- Prime Minister: Thorbjörn Fälldin
- Preceded by: Post established
- Succeeded by: Carl Tham

Deputy Minister for Budget
- In office 12 October 1979 – 8 October 1982
- Prime Minister: Thorbjörn Fälldin
- Preceded by: Post established
- Succeeded by: Post abolished

Minister of Communications (acting)
- In office 5 May 1981 – 22 May 1981
- Prime Minister: Thorbjörn Fälldin
- Preceded by: Ulf Adelsohn
- Succeeded by: Claes Elmstedt

Minister for the Environment
- In office 4 October 1991 – 16 June 1994
- Prime Minister: Carl Bildt
- Preceded by: Birgitta Dahl
- Succeeded by: Görel Thurdin

Personal details
- Born: Sten Olof Håkan Johansson; 31 July 1937 (age 89) Ljungby, Sweden
- Party: Centre
- Education: Stockholm School of Economics

Sten Olof Håkan Johansson (born 31 July 1937) is a Swedish politician, who was the leader of the Swedish Centre Party from 1987 to 1998 and minister for the environment from 1991 to 1994.

== Early life ==
Olof Johansson was born in Ljungby, Kronoberg County. He studied at the Stockholm School of Economics, and was the leader of the Centre Party youth organisation from 1969 to 1971.

== Career ==
In 1971 he was elected a Member of the Swedish Parliament, a position he held until 1976, and again 1978–1979 and 1982–1998. He held cabinet posts in the centre-right governments 1976–1978 and 1979–1982. In 1987 he succeeded Karin Söder, who stepped down for health reasons, as the leader of the Centre Party. When the centre-right regained power in 1991, Johansson became Minister for the Environment in the Carl Bildt government, but left the post over his opposition to the construction of the Oresund Bridge in the summer of 1994, shortly before the Social Democrats regained power in the September elections.

After having seen his party doing badly in the elections of 1994 and still trailing in the polls less than a year before the upcoming 1998 elections, Johansson stepped down as party leader, leaving the fate of the party in the hands of his little-known successor Lennart Daléus, prompting the Centre Party to print election posters with a portrait of Daléus, simply saying "This is Lennart".

After his withdrawal from politics he has been appointed as Chairman of the board of various institutions and companies. Most notably, he was the chairman of the Swedish state-owned alcohol monopoly company, Systembolaget, between 2002 and 2009.

== Awards ==
In 1999, he was awarded the Illis quorum.

Party political offices
Preceded by Karin Söder	Chairman of the Centre Party of Sweden; 1987–1998	Succeeded by Lennart Daléus
Political offices
Preceded by Birgitta Dahl	Minister for the Environment; 1991–1994	Succeeded by Görel Thurdin
