= Mijailo Mijailović =

Swedish murderer (born 1978)

- Born: 6 December 1978 (age 47); Stockholm, Sweden
- Criminal charge: Murder
- Criminal penalty: Life imprisonment
- Criminal status: Imprisoned at Anstalten Kumla

Mijailo Mijailović (Serbian: Мијаило Мијаиловић; born 6 December 1978) is a Swedish convicted murderer who was convicted of stabbing Swedish Minister for Foreign Affairs Anna Lindh, on 10 September 2003 at the NK department store in Stockholm. Lindh died early the following day after unsuccessful surgical treatment to try to save her life.

== Early life ==
Mijailo was born in Stockholm, Sweden, on 6 December 1978 to Serbian parents from the town of Mladenovac. His parents immigrated to Sweden in the late 1960s as foreign workers. When he was 6 years old, he was sent to live with his paternal grandparents in Serbia, where he went to school. He returned to Sweden when the Yugoslav Wars began. He finished school in 1995, with a grade point average of 3.4 (out of 5.0). He enrolled in Swedish high school but dropped out in the second grade. His school mates remember him as a lone wolf.

In 1997, at 18 years old, he stabbed his father and was convicted of aggravated assault. His father was an alcoholic, and often assaulted Mijailo's mother and children. In June 1999, he was convicted of holding illegal arms; he had a knife on him. In April, the same year, he threatened a young girl and her mother.

== Assassination and conviction ==
On the afternoon of 10 September 2003, Mijailo Mijailović attacked Swedish Minister for Foreign Affairs Anna Lindh, while she was shopping in the ladies' department at the NK department store in central Stockholm. Lindh was stabbed in her chest, stomach and arms. The minister was rushed to a hospital and underwent extensive surgery, but died the following morning. Mijailović was able to flee the scene after the crime, but was arrested two weeks later with the help of surveillance photos from the department store.

Swedish newspapers have suggested that Mijailović was released from a mental institution just five days before the killing of Lindh, that he has serious mental problems, and had previously been convicted of violent crimes. His motive was not considered political, although Mijailović shortly after his arrest was identified on a photograph as standing in the front row of a crowd adhering to then–Liberal People's Party chairman Lars Leijonborg delivering a speech. A pamphlet taken from the party's electoral cabin was also retrieved among the belongings he had dumped shortly after the murder.

On 6 January 2004, after being presented with the evidence against him, Mijailović confessed to the police that he had stabbed Anna Lindh, without the intention to kill her. He said, "I'm not interested in politics", and "It could have been someone other than Anna Lindh. I have nothing personal against Anna Lindh." The court trial against Mijailović took place from 14 to 17 January 2004. He was found guilty, but the sentencing was postponed to await the recommendations of a psychiatric evaluation ordered by the court.

On 9 March, a report concluded that Mijailović was not considered to be criminally insane at the time of the assassination, and on 23 March, he was sentenced to life imprisonment. However, on 8 July, an appeals court overturned that sentence after tests had concluded that he was suffering from a mental illness at the time of the killing. As a result of the appeals court decision, Mijailović was taken from prison to a closed psychiatric hospital.

Mijailović was for some time a citizen of both Serbia and Montenegro and Sweden but after the crime applied to have his Swedish citizenship revoked. His application was granted by the Swedish Migration Agency on 20 September 2004; however, this did not have any effect on the judicial process.

On 2 December 2004, Mijailović was sentenced by the Supreme Court of Sweden to life imprisonment for the killing of Anna Lindh, overruling the appeals court judgement. He has since attempted to have himself relocated to a Serbian prison, expressing fear for his life. As of 2022, these attempts have been without success.

In 2025, Mijailo Mijailovic has been granted special leave. The Swedish Prison and Probation Service sees no security obstacles.

== 2011 interview ==
In August 2011 Mijailović gave an interview in the Swedish newspaper Expressen, his first such interview since his arrest, in which he talked about the murder of Lindh. Mijailović explained in the interview that the murder was motivated by his hatred of politicians, whom he considered responsible for his hopeless life situation and the fact that he was a "man without a future". Mijailović had met Lindh at the entrance of the NK department store, when Lindh was on her way in. Mijailović recognized her and decided to attack her. He went into the store looking for Lindh on several floors before he finally found her and carried out the attack. He then fled the scene, expecting the police would soon apprehend him.

Mijailović claims not to have been mentally ill at the time. "Feeling bad is not the same as being sick", he explained. The reason that he tried to appear as being mentally ill following his arrest was his belief that life in a psychiatric hospital would be easier than in a prison. Mijailović also revealed in the interview that he had wanted to attack the politician Lars Leijonborg the day before the murder of Lindh, but that he did not have his knife with him at the time. Mijailović says he now realizes that it was wrong to blame his own failures in life on politicians and that he has caused a lot of sorrow.
