= Idun Lovén =

Swedish artist, art educator, educationalist (1916–1988)

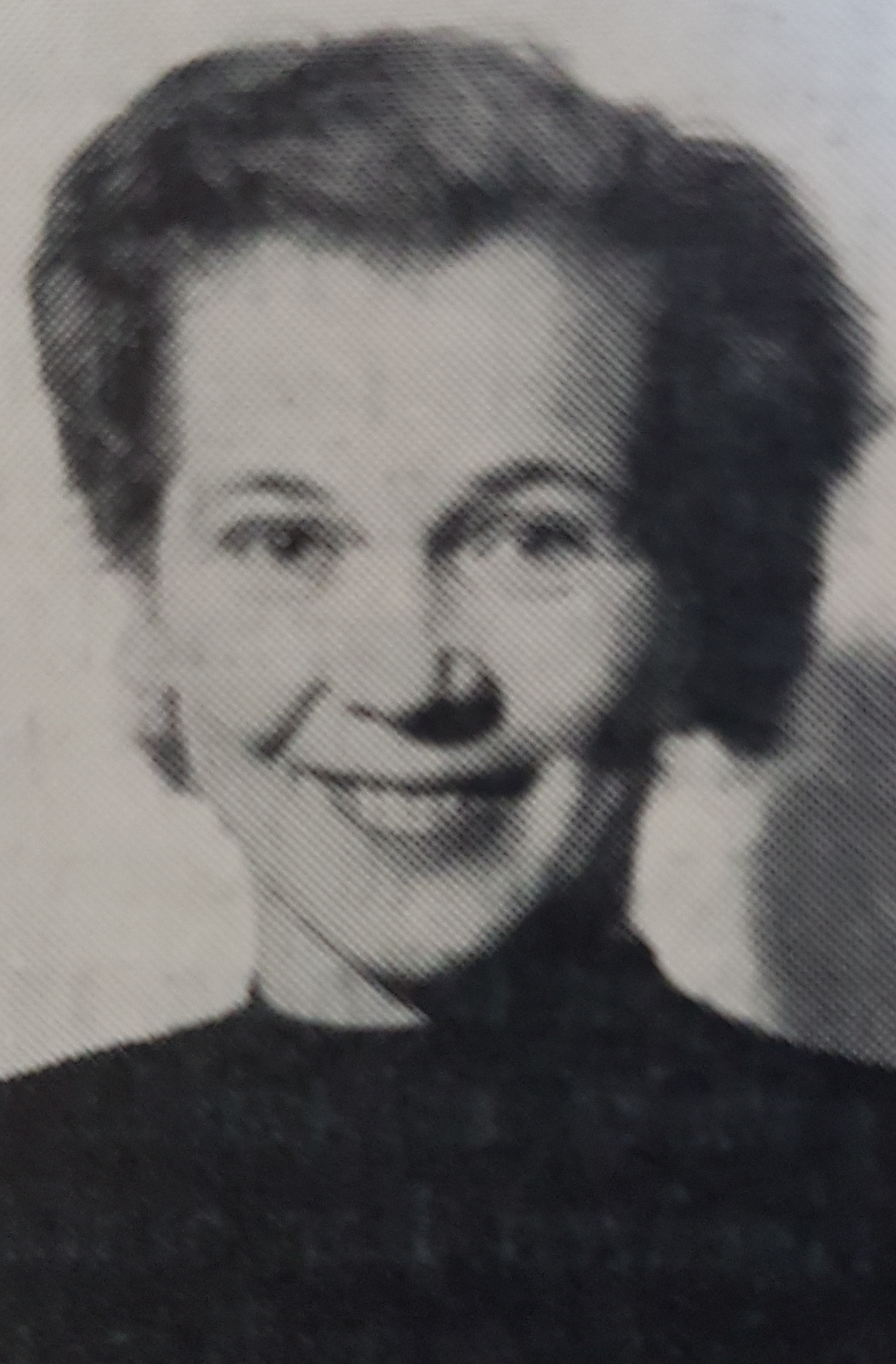
- Born: 12 April 1916; Växjö, Sweden
- Died: 20 February 1988 (aged 71); Solna, Sweden
- Occupations: Painter and art teacher

Siri Ingrid Idun Lovén (12 April 1916, Växjö—20 February 1988, Solna) was a Swedish painter and art teacher who is remembered for her efforts to improve the status of art schools in Sweden. She headed the art school Konstskolan Idun Lovén in southern Stockholm from 1958 to 1988, introducing new art forms such as sculpture, film, theatre and dance into the curriculum. Her own paintings include landscapes of Lapland and the Kinda region as well as still life's and portraits.

== Biography ==
Born on 12 April 1916 in Växjö, Siri Ingrid Idun Lovén was the next youngest daughter of the training college teacher Johannes Samuel Lovén and Ester Zidonia née Bengtsson. From the age of four, Lovén was brought up in Linköping. On matriculating from high school in 1934, Lovén studied art in Linsköping under Leoo Verde. In 1938–39, she spent a year at the Statens håndverks- og kunstindustriskole in Oslo with teachers including Per Krohg and Carl von Hanno. In parallel, she also studied at the Swedish Art Academy. In the mid-1950s, thanks to a travel grant, Lovén went on study trips around Europe and North Africa.

== Career ==
Following exhibitions in Östersund (1945) and Linköping (1958), Lunvén received considerable praise from the critics for the oils and watercolours she exhibited in Linköping in 1953. Her works in the 1950s included landscapes from Lappland and the Kinda Bay as well as still lifes and portraits. She adopted the style of expressive colourism, profound but rather heavy, applying her full palette in her still lifes and portraits.

As a teacher, she strove to improve the status of Sweden's private colleges of art. In this connection, she was an active member of the Swedish free art schools organization (Stiftelsen Fria Konstskolor). In 1957, she took over control of the school in Stockholm founded by the art teacher Edward Berggren which soon became known as Konstskolan Idun Lovén. She enlarged the scope of teaching to cover sculpture, film, theatre and dance, arranging regular cultural evenings.

Idun Lovén died in Solna on 20 February 1988.
