= Lena Sommestad =

Swedish politician and economic historian

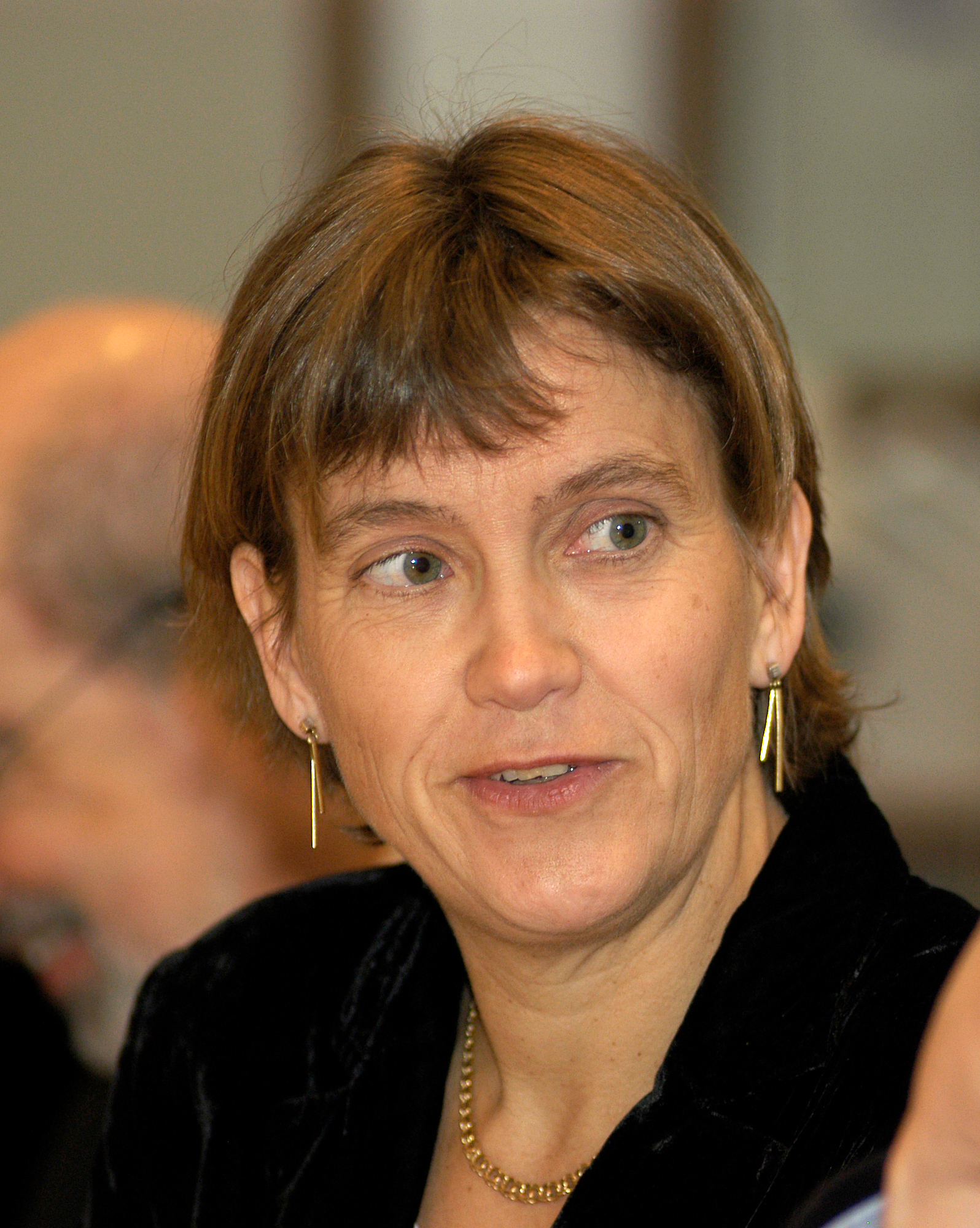

Minister for the Environment
- In office 2002–2006

County Governor of Halland
- In office 2014–2020

Personal details
- Born: 3 April 1957 (age 69)
- Party: Social Democratic

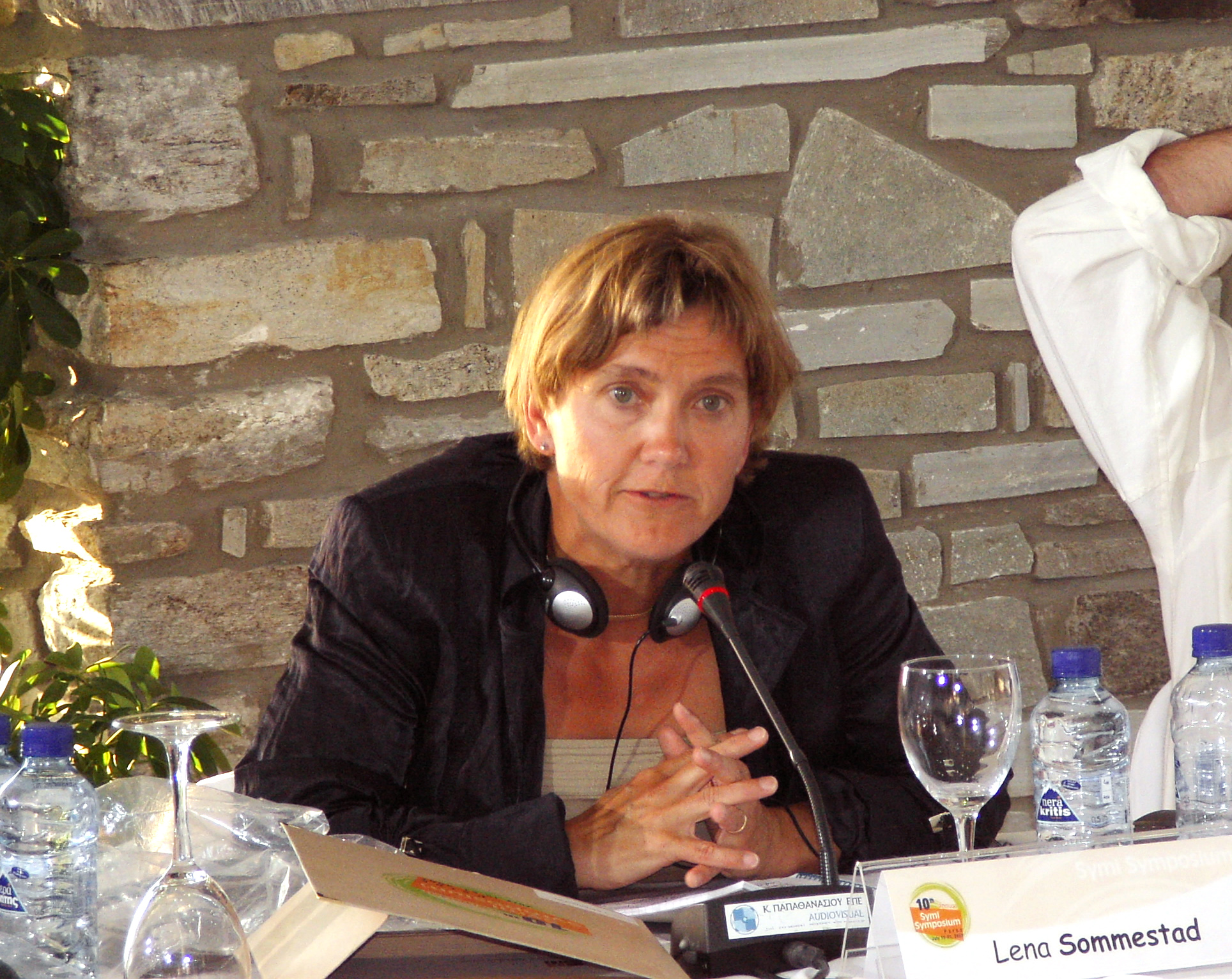
Lena Sommestad

Lena Sommestad (born 3 April 1957) is a Swedish Social Democratic politician and economic historian. She was Minister for the Environment in the Ministry of Sustainable Development in the Cabinet of Göran Persson from 2002 to 2006.

Sommestad studied social sciences at Uppsala University and received a PhD degree in 1992. In the Fall of 1994, Sommestad was a Fellow at the Swedish Collegium for Advanced Study in Uppsala, Sweden. From 1998 to 2002 she was the managing director of the Swedish Institute for Futures Studies (Institutet för framtidsstudier). She had not held a politically elected office before Prime Minister Göran Persson made her Minister for the Environment in October 2002.

Between April 2014 and March 2020, she was County Governor of Halland.

== Selected bibliography ==
- "Sågverksarbetarna i strukturomvandlingen: hur arbetsstyrkan vid Söderhamns och Söderalas exportsågverk förändrades till storlek och sammansättning under mellankrigstiden" - 1983.
- "Från mejerska till mejerist: en studie av mejeriyrkets maskuliniseringsprocess" - 1992.
- "Rethinking gender and work: rural women in the Western world" - 1995 Gender & Society no. 1.
- "Welfare state attitudes to the male breadwinning system: the United States and Sweden in comparative perspective" - 1997 International review of social history no. 5.
- "Kvinnor mot kvinnor: om systerskapets svårigheter" - 1999 Redaktör tillsammans with Christina Florin and Ulla Wikander.
- Befolkning och Välfärd—Demografiska förutsättningar för framtidens välfärdspolitik. Institutet för framtidsstudier 2002, editor.
- "The hidden pulse of history", Scandinavian Journal of History, 25, pp. 131–146 - with Bo Malmberg.
