= Görel Thurdin =

Swedish liberal politician (born 1942)

- Campaign poster of Thurdin dated 1988

Minister of Physical Planning
- In office 1991–1994

Minister of Environment
- In office 1994–1994

Deputy Speaker of the Swedish Parliament
- In office 1994–1998

Personal details
- Born: 26 May 1942 (age 84) Västerås, Sweden
- Party: Centre Party
- Education: Umeå University

Görel Thurdin (born 26 May 1942) is a Swedish politician who served as the minister of physical planning and the minister of environment in the 1990s, and was a member of the Swedish Parliament.

== Biography ==
Thurdin was born in Västerås on 26 May 1942. She is a graduate of Umeå University. She began her political career as a member of the municipal board in Örnsköldsvik and was in office until 1985. Then she was elected to the Swedish Parliament in 1986 for Centre Party. Next year she was made the second vice chair of the party.

Thurdin was the minister of physical planning in the period of 1991–1994 and minister of environment in 1994. She also acted as the deputy speaker of the Swedish Parliament. As of 2009, she headed the UNESCO council in Sweden. She was also the chair of International Save the Children Alliance.
