= Konstskolan Idun Lovén =

Art school in Stockholm, Sweden

Coordinates: 59°17′47″N 18°01′51″E

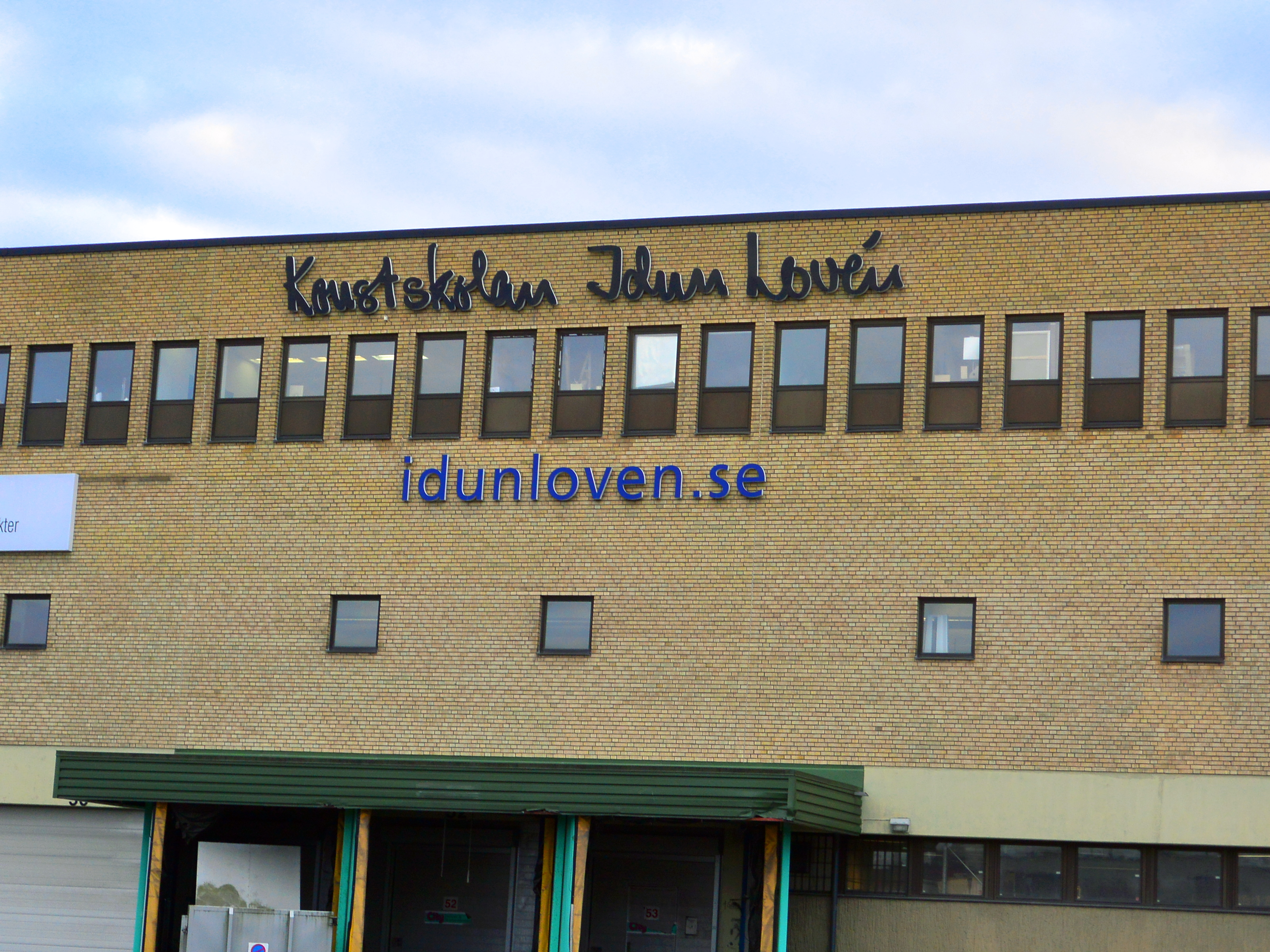
Idun Lovén's premises in Östberga.

Konstskolan Idun Lovén (Idun Lovén Art School, or Idun Lovén for short) is a preparative art school in Stockholm, Sweden. The school is named after the artist and former headmistress Idun Lovén.

== Education ==
Idun Lovén consists of two departments; sculpture and painting. Each of these hosts about 22 students divided into two year groups. The maximum time to study at Idun Lovén is two years (as of 2008).

Studies consists of equal parts model painting/sculpting and projects. During the projects students are working in groups or individually with realizing a more demanding task they have put up themselves.

== History ==
=== Headmasters ===
- 1920: The school is founded by painter Edward Berggren and sculptor Gottfrid Larsson.
- 1958: School taken over by sculptor Idun Lovén.
- 1988: Painter Börje Svensson becomes headmaster.
- 2002: Sculpress Gunilla Wihlborg becomes headmaster.

=== Locations ===
- -2005: Building Skeppet, Värtahamnen.
- 2005-2019: Minuthandlarvägen 2, Årsta partihallar, Årsta. Old advertising office of ICA.
- 2019–: Campus Flemingsberg, Huddinge.

== Funding ==
The schools receives government funding but also collects a fee (7500 SEK/term as of 2009) from the students.

== Teachers ==
=== Sculpting ===
- Gunilla Wihlborg
- Irène Westman
- Erik Åkerlund
- John Stenborg

=== Painting ===
- Daniel Jensen
- Irina Gebuhr
- Henrik Samuelsson (on leave as of 2008)
- Erik Jeor

=== Theory ===
- Susanna Slöör (-2008)
- Per Hasselberg (2008-)

== Prominent former students ==
Prominent Swedish artists who have studied at Konstskolan Idun Lovén includes:

- Linn Fernström
- Carl Hammoud
- Annelie Wallin
