= Hansson II cabinet =

Government of Sweden from 1936 to 1939

Per Albin Hansson's second cabinet
- 34th Cabinet of Sweden

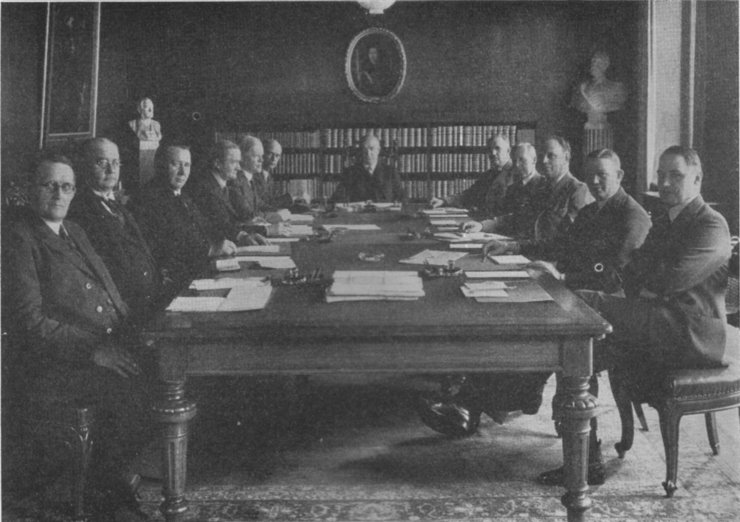
- Hansson II cabinet
- Date formed: 28 September 1936
- Date dissolved: 13 December 1939

People and organisations
- Head of state: Gustaf V
- Head of government: Per Albin Hansson
- Member party: Social Democrats; Farmers' League
- Status in legislature: Coalition majority (upper & lower house)
- Opposition party: General Electoral League; People's Party; Socialist Party; Communist Party of Sweden

History
- Incoming formation: 1936 election
- Outgoing formation: Outbreak of the Winter War
- Election: 1936 election
- Predecessor: Pehrsson-Bramstorp cabinet
- Successor: Hansson III cabinet

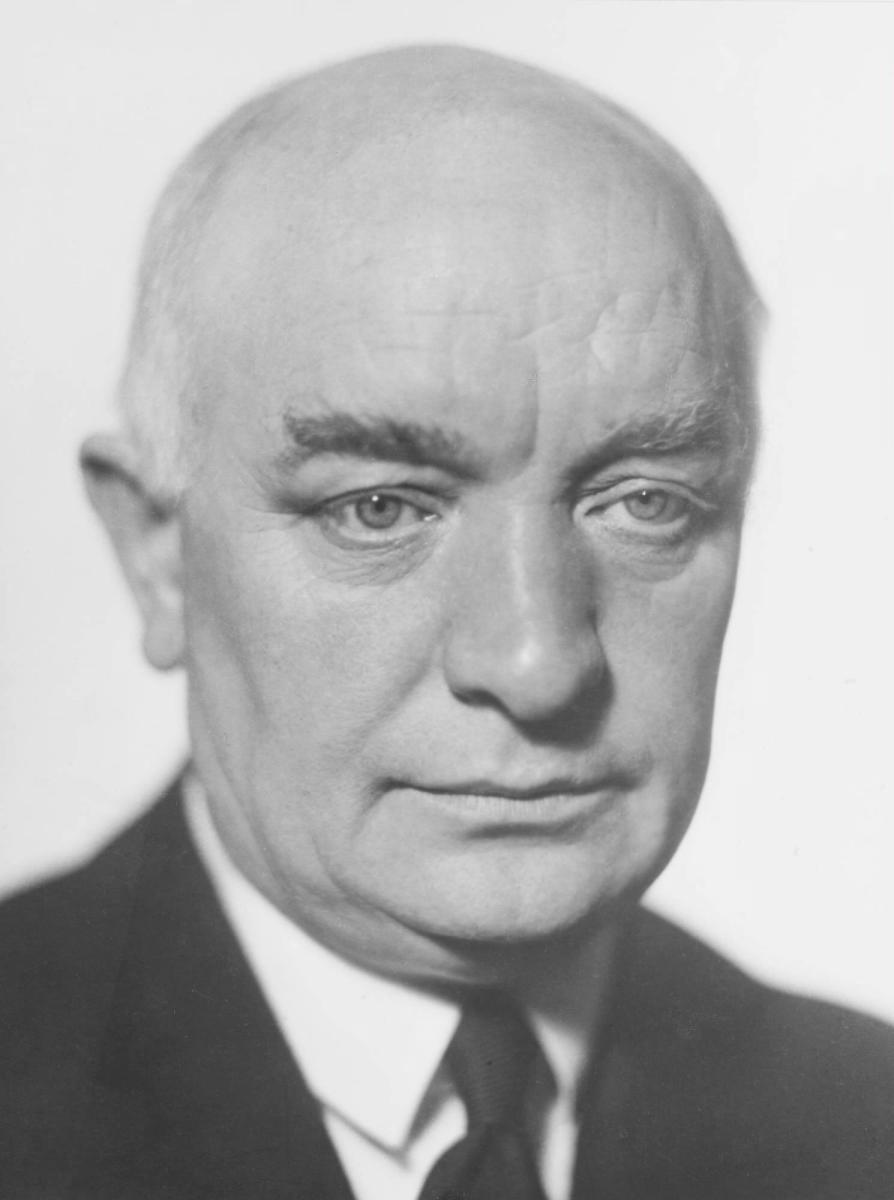
Prime Minister Per Albin Hansson.

The Hansson II cabinet (Swedish: regeringen Hansson II) was the government of Sweden from 28 September 1936 to 13 December 1939. It was a coalition majority government between the Social Democrats and the Farmers' League, led by Prime Minister Per Albin Hansson of the Social Democrats.

The cabinet was installed following the 1936 general election. When the Winter War broke out in 1939, the cabinet resigned and the national unity Hansson III cabinet was formed between the four largest parties in the Riksdag (Swedish parliament).

== Background and formation ==
=== Before the 1936 election ===
Since 1933, when a historic compromise was reached between the Social Democrats and the Farmers' League regarding political collaboration, the parties had an organized cooperation, which was an important part of the Swedish model. This cooperation ceased temporarily in the summer of 1936, when Prime Minister Per Albin Hansson resigned his first cabinet. The reason for the resignation was that it did not get the support in parliament for its defense policy, even though it was only three months left to the 1936 general election.

The task of forming a new government then went to the Farmers' League's leader Axel Pehrsson-Bramstorp, who formed the single-party Pehrsson-Bramstorp cabinet. This so-called "vacation government" did not launch any reforms or implement any changes in the law since the parliament was not collected. The 1936 general election was a major success for the Social Democrats, which gave rise to Prime Minister Pehrsson-Bramstorp to submit his cabinet's resignation.

=== After the 1936 election ===
After the 1936 general election, the task of forming a new government went back to Per Albin Hansson. To the general astonishment, he began negotiations with the Farmers' League, possibly because the Social Democrats did not want to depend on any of the left parties in parliamentary polls. Together the two parties in the coalition got a majority in both chambers, unlike previous Swedish governments that reigned in minority.

== Ministers ==
The Farmers' League received three ministerial posts: Axel Pehrsson-Bramstorp as minister for agriculture, Karl Gustaf Westman as minister for justice, and Janne Nilsson as minister for defence. On 9 December 1938 Nilsson died and was replaced by a Social Democratic politician, Per Edvin Sköld.

Portfolio	Minister	Took office	Left office	Party
Prime Minister's Office
Prime Minister, Head of the Prime Minister's Office	Per Albin Hansson	28 September 1936	13 December 1939	Social Democrats
Ministry of Finance
Minister for Finance, Head of the Ministry of Finance	Ernst Wigforss	28 September 1936	13 December 1939	Social Democrats
Ministry for Foreign Affairs
Minister for Foreign Affairs, Head of the Ministry for Foreign Affairs	Rickard Sandler	28 September 1936	13 December 1939	Social Democrats
Ministry of Justice
Minister for Justice, Head of the Ministry of Justice	Karl Gustaf Westman	28 September 1936	13 December 1939	Centre
Ministry of Defence
Minister for Defence, Head of the Ministry of Defence	Janne Nilsson	28 September 1936	9 December 1938	Centre
Minister for Defence, Head of the Ministry of Defence	Per Edvin Sköld	16 December 1938	13 December 1939	Social Democrats
Ministry of Health and Social Affairs
Minister for Health and Social Affairs, Head of the Ministry of Health and Social Affairs	Gustav Möller	28 September 1936	16 December 1938	Social Democrats
Minister for Health and Social Affairs, Head of the Ministry of Health and Social Affairs	Albert Forslund	16 December 1938	13 December 1939	Social Democrats
Ministry for Communications
Minister for Communications, Head of the Ministry of Communications	Albert Forslund	28 September 1936	16 December 1938	Social Democrats
Minister for Communications, Head of the Ministry of Communications	Gerhard Strindlund	16 December 1938	13 December 1939	Centre
Ministry of Education and Ecclesiastical Affairs
Minister of Education and Ecclesiastical Affairs, Head of the Ministry of Education and Ecclesiastical Affairs	Arthur Engberg	28 September 1936	13 December 1939	Social Democrats
Ministry of Agriculture
Minister for Agriculture, Head of the Ministry of Agriculture	Axel Pehrsson-Bramstorp	28 September 1936	13 December 1939	Centre
Ministry of Commerce and Industry
Minister of Commerce and Industry, Head of the Ministry of Commerce and Industry	Per Edvin Sköld	28 September 1936	16 December 1938	Social Democrats
Minister of Commerce and Industry, Head of the Ministry of Commerce and Industry	Gustav Möller	16 December 1938	13 December 1939	Social Democrats
Ministry of Supply
Minister of Supply, Head of the Ministry of Supply	Herman Eriksson	15 October 1939	13 December 1939	Social Democrats
Ministers without portfolio
Law consult	Nils Quensel	28 September 1936	13 December 1939	Independent
Law consult	Karl Levinson	15 October 1939	31 August 1938	Social Democrats
Law consult	Herman Eriksson	31 August 1938	14 October 1939	Social Democrats
Law consult	Gunnar Hägglöf	14 October 1939	13 December 1939	Independent

== Policy ==
In the period leading to World War II, the government implemented a number of social reforms, including expensive district grouping of basic pensions and the introduction of two weeks paid vacation for all workers.

== Resignation ==
When the Finnish Winter War broke out, the government resigned and instead formed a national unity government that consisted of the Social Democrats, the Farmers' League, the People's Party, and the National Organization of the Right.

Preceded by Pehrsson-Bramstorp	Cabinet of Sweden; 1936–1939	Succeeded by Hansson III
