= Nils Sköld =

Swedish Army officer (1921–1996)

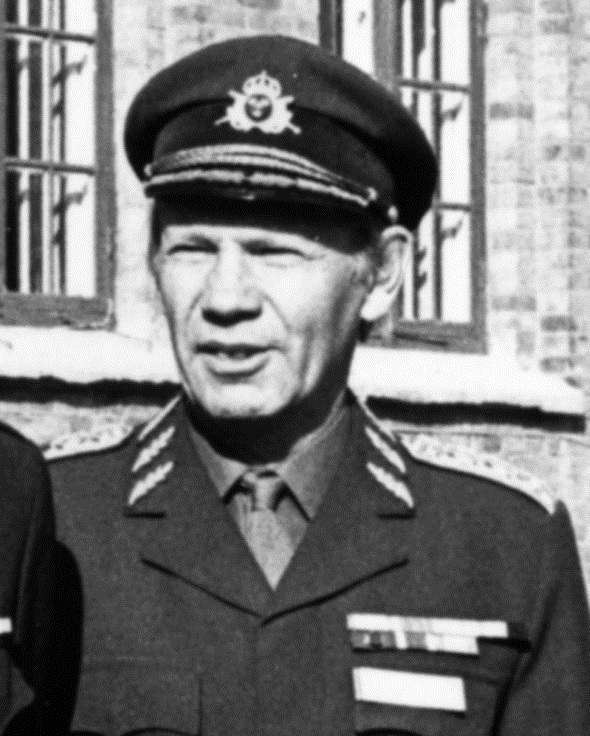
- Sköld in 1978.
- Born: Nils Gunnar Sköld; 23 May 1921; Stockholm, Sweden
- Died: 17 March 1996 (aged 74); Stockholm, Sweden
- Relatives: Per Edvin Sköld (father); Margareta Biörnstad (sister)
- Military career
- Allegiance: Sweden
- Branch: Swedish Army
- Service years: 1943–1984
- Rank: Lieutenant General
- Commands: Hälsinge Regiment; Chief of Staff, Milo V; Eastern Military District; Commandant General in Stockholm; Chief of the Army
- Awards: Order of the Sword; UNEF Medal

Lieutenant General Nils Gunnar Sköld (23 May 1921 – 17 March 1996) was a Swedish Army officer. He served as Commanding General of the Eastern Military District and Commandant General in Stockholm from 1974 to 1976 and as Chief of the Army from 1976 to 1984.

== Early life ==
Sköld was born on 23 May 1921 in Stockholm, Sweden, the son of the politician and former Minister for Defence Per Edvin Sköld and his wife Edit (née Persson). He was also brother to the Marshal of the Realm Per Sköld and the first female National Antiquarian Margareta Biörnstad.

== Career ==
Sköld was commissioned as an officer in 1943 and attended the Royal Swedish Army Staff College from 1948 to 1950. Sköld became a captain of the General Staff in 1954 and served in the Army Staff's Organization Department the same year. He served at the Defence Staff's Planning Department in 1957 and was company commander of the Swedish UN battalion in Gaza in 1959. Sköld served at the Norrbotten Regiment (I 19) the same year and was promoted to major in 1960 and was also teacher of strategy at the Royal Swedish Army Staff College in 1960. He was promoted to lieutenant colonel in 1962 and served at the Norrbotten Regiment (I 19) in 1963. Sköld was promoted to colonel of the General Staff in 1964 and served as section chief at the Defence Staff from 1964 to 1967 and was after that regimental commander of Hälsinge Regiment (I 14) from 1967 to 1968.

He was chief of staff at the Western Military District (Milo V) from 1968 to 1969. Sköld was promoted to major general in 1969 and was head of the Army Materiel Administration (armématerielförvaltningen) at the Swedish Defence Materiel Administration and the Technical Staff Corps (Tekniska stabskåren) from 1969 to 1974. He was promoted to lieutenant general in 1974 and was military commander at the Eastern Military District (Milo Ö) and the Commandant General in Stockholm from 1974 to 1976. Sköld was then Chief of the Army from 1976 to 1984. As Chief of the Army he stressed the role of conscription in a major public defense of more traditional kind and laid great emphasis on issues concerning security policy and leadership in war. His defense doctrine was summed up in the concept of "tough guys" ("sega gubbar"), which accounted for an organization where every man was armed, and where a tenacious defense battle could be conducted over the entire Swedish territory.

He was an expert in the 1962 Defense Commission and in the 1965 Defense Investigation. Sköld was a member of the 1969 Defense Research Investigation. He was an expert at the Ministry of Defence from 1984 to 1987 and chairman of the Friends of the Swedish National Museum of Science and Technology from 1986. Sköld also made a contribution to military band by laying the foundations for the army music platoon.

== Personal life ==
In 1945, Sköld married Inger Rutqvist (1924–2006), the daughter of the timber dealer John Rutqvist and Elma, née Wikström. He was the father of Per-Olov (born 1949) and Ingemar (born 1953).

Like his father and grandfather, Sköld was a social democrat, which he also declared with an openness that was less common among senior officers.

== Death ==
Sköld died on 17 March 1996. The funeral took place on 27 March 1996 in Saint Bridget Church in Nockeby, Stockholm. He was interred on 7 May 1996 at the Kungsholm Cemetery in Stockholm.

== Dates of rank ==
- 1943 – Second Lieutenant
- 19?? – Lieutenant
- 1954 – Captain
- 1960 – Major
- 1962 – Lieutenant Colonel
- 1964 – Colonel
- 1969 – Major General
- 1974 – Lieutenant General

== Awards and decorations ==
- (Sweden) Commanders 1st Class of the Order of the Sword (5 June 1971)
- (Sweden) Commander of the Order of the Sword (6 June 1968)
- United Nations Emergency Force Medal

== Honours ==
- Member of the Royal Swedish Academy of War Sciences (1960)

Military offices
Preceded by Claës Skoglund	Chief of Staff of the Western Military District; 1968–1969	Succeeded by Bengt Liljestrand
Preceded by Ove Ljung	Eastern Military District; Commandant General in Stockholm; 1974–1976	Succeeded by Gunnar Eklund
Preceded by Carl Eric Almgren	Chief of the Army; 1976–1984	Succeeded by Erik G. Bengtsson
