= Bengt Lehander =

Swedish Air Force officer

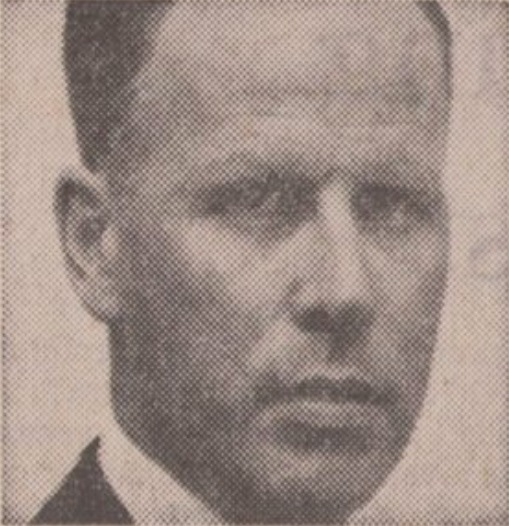
- Lehander c. in the mid-1960s.
- Born: Bengt Anders Lehander; 25 June 1925; Skagersvik, Sweden
- Died: 9 May 1994 (aged 68)
- Military career
- Allegiance: Sweden
- Branch: Swedish Air Force
- Service years: 1947–1988
- Rank: Lieutenant General
- Commands: Skaraborg Wing; Vice Chief of the Defence Staff; Eastern Military District; Commandant General in Stockholm

Lieutenant General Bengt Anders Lehander (25 June 1925 – 9 May 1994) was a Swedish Air Force officer. His senior commands include wing commander of the Skaraborg Wing, Vice Chief of the Defence Staff, military commander of the Eastern Military District and Commandant General in Stockholm.

== Early life ==
Lehander was born on 25 June 1925 in Skagersvik, Sweden, the son of Anders Lehander and his wife Gerda (née Gustafsson). He passed studentexamen in Linköping in 1944.

== Career ==
Lehander was commissioned as an officer in 1947 and was assigned as a second lieutenant to the Swedish Air Force. Lehander served as a flight instructor at the Swedish Air Force Flying School from 1948 to 1955 and completed the technical course at the Royal Swedish Air Force Staff College from 1956 to 1957. He then served as a staff officer in the Air Staff's Operation Department from 1957 to 1960 before serving as Director of Flight Operations at the Södermanland Wing (F 11) from 1960 to 1962.

Lehander served as deputy head and head of the Air Staff's Organization Department from 1962 to 1965, and as staff officer at the Ministry of Defence from 1965 to 1968. He was promoted to colonel and appointed wing commander of the Skaraborg Wing (F 7) in 1968, and then served as head of division at the Defence Materiel Administration from 1972 to 1974. Lehander was promoted to major general in the Swedish Air Force 1974 and served as head of the Central Planning at the Defence Materiel Administration from 1974 to 1978. He was appointed Vice Chief of the Defence Staff in 1978 and head of the Planning Command (Planeringsledningen) in the Defence Staff. On 1 October 1982 he was promoted to lieutenant general and appointed military commander of the Eastern Military District, serving until 1988. Lehander also served as Commandant General in Stockholm from 1982 to 1988 when he retired.

== Personal life ==
In 1955, he married Isabella Laurell (born 1931), the daughter of Alvar Laurell and Flory (née Månsson).

== Death ==
Lehander died on 9 May 1994 and was buried at Danderyd Cemetery on 7 June 1994.

== Dates of rank ==
- 1947 – Second lieutenant
- 1949 – Lieutenant
- 1956 – Captain
- 1960 – Major
- 1963 – Lieutenant colonel
- 1968 – Colonel
- 1972 – Senior colonel
- 1974 – Major general
- 1982 – Lieutenant general

== Awards and decorations ==
- (Sweden) Commander 1st Class of the Order of the Sword (6 June 1974)
- (Sweden) Knight of the Order of the Sword (1964)
- (Netherlands) Knight Grand Cross of the Order of Orange-Nassau with Swords (11 May 1987)

== Bibliography ==
- Lehander, Bengt; Welin, Gustaf; Persson, Ragnar (1981). Försvarsmaktens avvägning (in Swedish). Linköping. SELIBR 639084.

Military offices
Preceded by Folke Barkman	Skaraborg Wing; 1968–1972	Succeeded by Karl-Erik Fernander
Preceded by Bengt Schuback	Vice Chief of the Defence Staff; 1978–1982	Succeeded by Lars-Bertil Persson as Deputy Chief
Preceded by Gunnar Eklund	Eastern Military District; 1982–1988	Succeeded by Bror Stefenson
Preceded by Gunnar Eklund	Commandant General in Stockholm; 1982–1988	Succeeded by Bror Stefenson
