= Gerhard Strindlund =

Swedish politician (1890–1957)

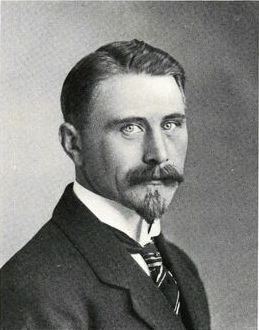

Minister of Communications (Transport)
- In office 1938–1939
- Prime Minister: Per Albin Hansson
- Preceded by: Albert Forslund

Minister for Social Affairs
- In office 1936 – December 1936

Personal details
- Born: 24 September 1890 Sollefteå parish, Sweden
- Died: 10 October 1957 (aged 67) Essinge parish, Stockholm county, Sweden
- Party: Agrarian Party
- Occupation: Agronomist

Gerhard Strindlund (1890–1957) was a Swedish politician who held various cabinet posts in the 1930s. He was a member of the Agrarian Party.

== Biography ==
Strindlund was born in Sollefteå parish, Västernorrland county, on 24 September 1890. He studied agriculture in Denmark. In 1921 he joined the Agrarian Party and was elected to the Riksdag. In 1936 he was appointed minister for social affairs. In 1938 he was named as the minister of communications (Transport) in the cabinet led by Prime Minister Per Albin Hansson replacing Albert Forslund in the post. Strindlund resigned from the office in December 1939. In 1941 Strindlund was appointed director general and head of the Swedish Forest Agency and left the Riksdag. During his term at the Riksdag he was among those who attempted to formulate a special kind of compensation to blind people. His tenure as director general of the agency lasted until 1953.

Strindlund died in Essinge parish, Stockholm county, on 10 October 1957.
