= Margareta Biörnstad =

Swedish archaeologist (1928–2019)

- Born: Margareta Sköld; May 23, 1928; Stockholm
- Died: November 1, 2019 (aged 91)
- Occupations: Archaeologist; National Antiquarian

Margareta Biörnstad (23 May 1928 – 1 November 2019), was a Swedish archaeologist. She was Sweden's first female National Antiquarian (riksantikvarie) from 1987 to 1993.

== Personal life ==
Biörnstad, born Sköld in Stockholm, was the daughter of former Swedish Minister for Defence Per Edvin Sköld and Edit Persson. She was the sister to former Chief of the Army Nils Sköld and former Marshal of the Realm Per Sköld. In 1952, she married Arne Biörnstad (1924–2012). As of 2016, she lived in Stockholm.

== Career ==
She got her fil.lic. degree in archaeology in 1955, and in 1992, she received an honorary doctorate from the Chalmers University of Technology. In 1951, she started working at the Swedish National Heritage Board and the Swedish History Museum, where she was Head Antiquarian from 1972 to 1987, and in 1987 she became Sweden's first female National Antiquarian, a position she held until 1993.

From 1967 to 1975, Biörnstad was a member of the Museum and Exhibition Expert Committee (1965 års musei- och utställningssakkunniga, MUS 65). The project caused much debate and resulted in giving increased responsibility to the County Administrative Boards for the counties' local cultural heritage. She was also a member of the Humanities and Social Science Research Council (Humanistisk-samhällsvetenskapliga forskningsrådet (HSFR)) as well as a board member of the Swedish Centre for Architecture and Design. During her time as National Antiquarian, infrastructure in Stockholm as well as other parts of Sweden went through major changes. Biörnstad became instrumental in recording, preserving and preventing destruction of archaeological sites and cultural heritage as water power was expanded and new railways were constructed.

Biörnstad was awarded the Gösta Berg Medal in 2006 and the Illis quorum in 2016 and is an honorary member of the Stockholms nation in Uppsala.

== Margareta Biörnstad Fund ==
The Margareta Biörnstad Fund was created in 1993 by Biörnstad's friends and colleagues to honor her as she retired. The purpose of the fund is to further international cooperation within the field of cultural heritage by financing field trips, further studies and international activities.

== Works ==
Biörnstad has written several book and articles about archaeological sites and finds, as well as cultural heritage.

=== Books, a selection ===
- Bronsvimpeln från Grimsta (in Swedish). Stockholm: Almqvist och Wiksell. 1958. OCLC 458545785.
- Kungl. Vitterhets historie och antikvitets akademiens fastigheter av antikvarisk karaktär jämte övriga områden ställda under akademiens eller Riksantikvarieämbetets förvaltning (in Swedish). Stockholm: Almqvist & Wiksell. 1960. OCLC 186432588.
- Jämtlands och Härjedalens historia. Arkeologisk inledning (in Swedish). Stockholm: Norstedt. 1962. OCLC 185314695.
- En järnåldersgrav vid Odensala (in Swedish). 1962. OCLC 939076171.
- Fornminnen i Härjedalen, Jämtland och Medelpad (in Swedish). 1965. OCLC 938273644.
- Riksantikvarieämbetets norrlandsundersökningar (in Swedish). Vol. 3, Stenarkivets uppläggning. 1967. OCLC 942930303.
- Landskaps- och bebyggelseförändringar under 1800-talet: rapport från symposium i Stockholm 11–12 September 1985. Brytpunkt (in Swedish). With Pär-Erik Back. Stockholm: Humanistisk-samhällsvetenskapliga forskningsrådet. 1986. ISBN 9789186362072.
- Forntid och framtid: en vänbok till Roland Pålsson (in Swedish). With Roland Pålsson. Stockholm: Riksantikvarieämbetet och Statens historiska museer. 1987. ISBN 9789171927019.
- Utvärdering av FOK-programmet: rapport 930331 (in Swedish). With Nils-Arvid Bringéus, Nils Storå. Oslo: Norges forskningsråd. 1993. ISBN 9788212001671.
- Arkeologi och samhälle: fornlämningars behandling i samhällsplaneringen (in Swedish). With Berta Stjernquist, Anne Carlie, Ewa Ryberg, Ella Ödmann. Stockholm: Riksantikvarieämbetet. 1993. OCLC 1096286935.
- Heritage in distress: experiences from international emergency rescue aid and development co-operation 1995–2002. With Bengt O H Johansson. Stockholm: Cultural Heritage without Borders. 2002. OCLC 924570661.
- Kulturminnesvård och vattenkraft 1942–1980: en studie med utgångspunkt från Riksantikvarieämbetets sjöregleringsundersökningar (in Swedish). Stockholm: Kungl. Vitterhets Historie och Antikvitets Akademien. 2006. ISBN 9789174023633.
