= Gustav Möller =

Swedish politician (1884–1970)

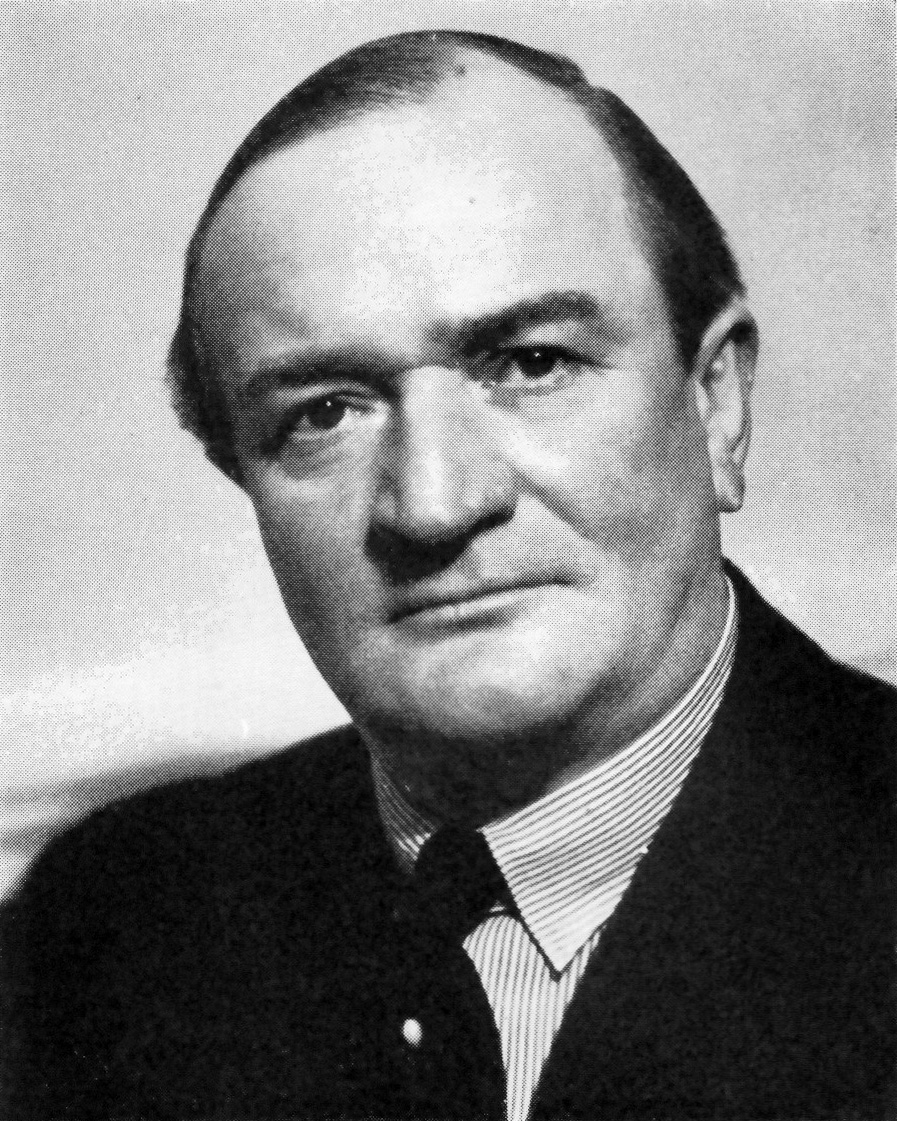

Minister of Health and Social Affairs
- In office 13 December 1939 – 1 October 1951
- Prime Minister: Per Albin Hansson; Tage Erlander
- Preceded by: Albert Forslund
- Succeeded by: Gunnar Sträng
- In office 28 September 1936 – 16 December 1938
- Prime Minister: Per Albin Hansson
- Preceded by: Gerhard Strindlund
- Succeeded by: Albert Forslund
- In office 24 September 1932 – 19 June 1936
- Prime Minister: Per Albin Hansson
- Preceded by: Sam Larsson
- Succeeded by: Gerhard Strindlund
- In office 18 October 1924 – 7 June 1926
- Prime Minister: Hjalmar Branting; Rickard Sandler
- Preceded by: Gösta Malm
- Succeeded by: Jakob Pettersson

Minister of Commerce and Industry
- In office 16 December 1938 – 13 December 1939
- Prime Minister: Per Albin Hansson
- Preceded by: Per Edvin Sköld
- Succeeded by: Fritiof Domö

Personal details
- Born: 6 June 1884 Malmö, Sweden
- Died: 15 August 1970 (aged 86) Stockholm, Sweden
- Party: Social Democratic
- Spouse(s): Gerda Andersson (1917–1924); Elsa Kleen (1926–1968, her death)

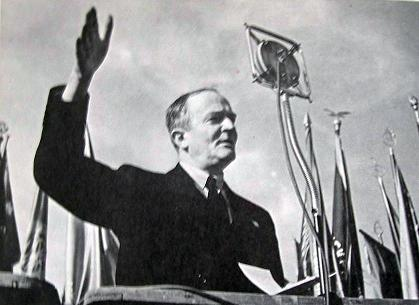
Gustav Möller delivering a speech.

Fritz Gustav Möller (6 June 1884 – 15 August 1970) was a Swedish politician and statesman who served as Minister for Social Affairs on four separate occasions between 1924 and 1951. A prominent member of the Social Democratic Party, Möller represented Stockholm in both chambers of the Riksdag for over 35 years, and is often credited as one of fathers of the Swedish welfare state.

== Life and career ==
Gustav Möller was born in 1884 to a poor family in Malmö, Sweden, but was discovered by his employer and given an education as an office accountant; however, he instead used it in the service of the labor movement, initially as a leader of its publishing house.

As party secretary and organizer of the Social Democratic base organization in 1916–1940, he oversaw the trebling of membership and local branches.

During his terms as the Minister of Social Affairs in 1936–38 and 1939–51, he is credited as the creator of the Swedish social security system and the welfare state called folkhemmet. He was partly influenced by Alva Myrdal and Gunnar Myrdal's ideas about policies that could help families, but more by the Danish Social Democrats C. V. Bramsnæs and Karl Kristian Steincke.

He was named honorary senior lecturer at the universities of Uppsala and Lund in 1945 and 1947, respectively.

There were two specific details of Möller's welfare policy that were colored by his childhood experiences:

1. There should be no stigmatization of the poor, no sorting out of those in need. Rich families as well as poor should have their children's allowance, old age pension and free medical treatment.

2. There should be as little bureaucratic paternalism and arbitrariness as possible. Eligibility should be governed by law. Preferably, the welfare assignments should be administered by the recipients themselves, as when unemployment allowances were administered by the trade unions. And allowances should always be cash.

Möller considered the welfare state a temporary stopgap rather than a goal in itself. A dedicated socialist, he resigned from government in 1951 rather than following his party into postwar compromises with private business.

He lived in Stockholm at the time of his death in 1970, his wife Else having died in 1968.
