= Södra Råda Old Church =

Coordinates: 59°00′14″N 14°12′15″E

- Södra Råda gamla kyrka
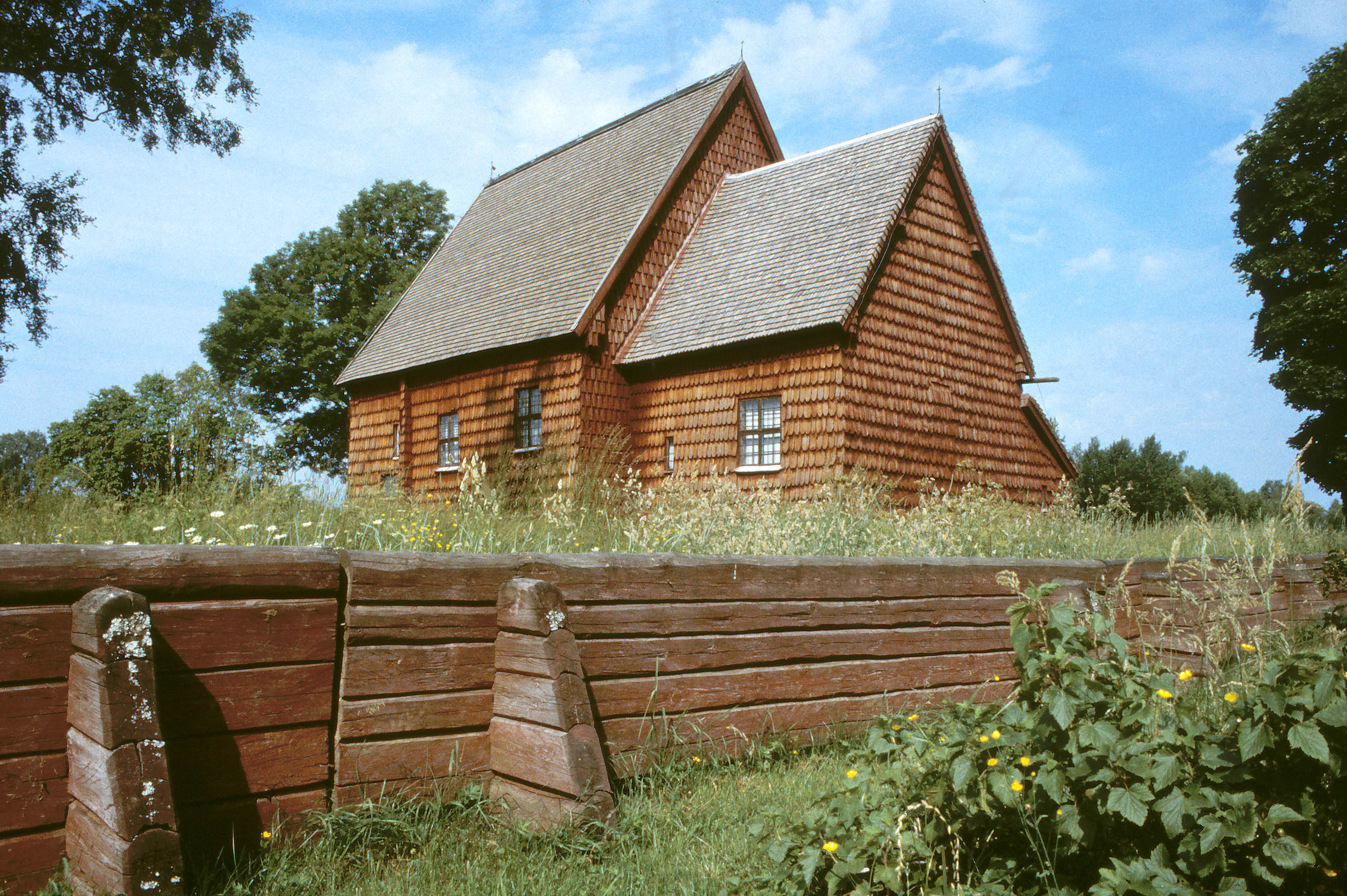
- Södra Råda Old Church
- Södra Råda Old Church
- Location: Gullspång Municipality
- Country: Sweden
- Denomination: Church of Sweden

Administration
- Diocese: Skara
- Parish: Amnehärad

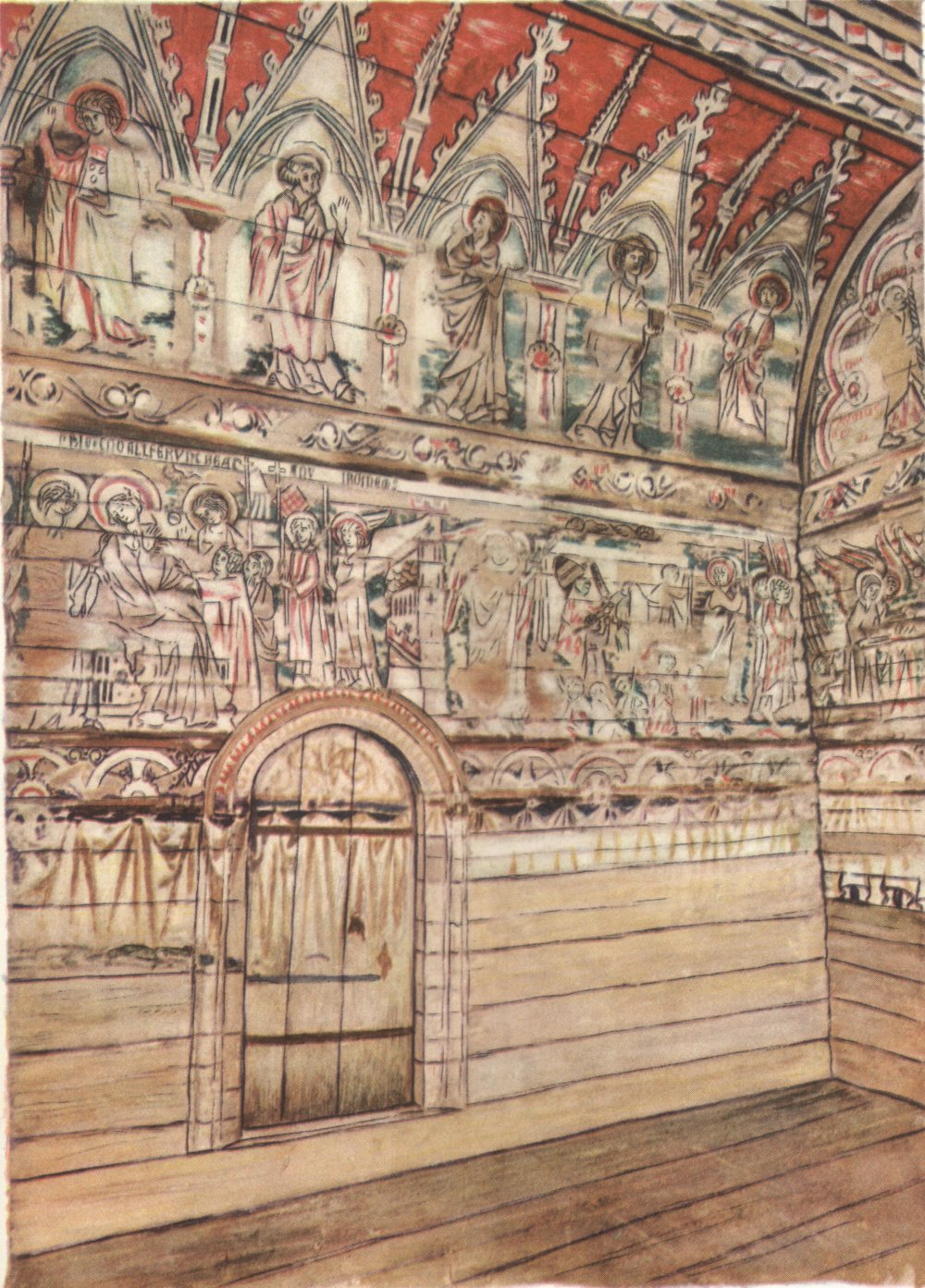
Paintings inside the church were dated to 1323.

Södra Råda Old Church (Swedish: Södra Råda gamla kyrka) was an early 14th-century timbered church in the parish of Södra Råda in Gullspång Municipality, Västra Götaland in Sweden. It was one of the oldest preserved wooden churches in the country.

The paintings covering the walls and the trefoil-shaped wooden ceiling of the church were considered one of the best and best-preserved examples of Scandinavian wall-painting from the Middle Ages. The oldest, anonymous, paintings in the chancel dated to 1323. Later paintings in the nave dated from 1493 and were signed by a painter named Amund.

The church was burnt down on 12 November 2001. A mentally ill man convicted for the murder of a five-year-old girl in 2003 also confessed to and was convicted for the burning of the church. A project led by the Swedish National Heritage Board has since excavated the site, and a reconstruction of the church, using medieval methods of construction, has been completed and opened in 2022.
