= Gunnar Eklund =

Swedish military officer (1920–2010)

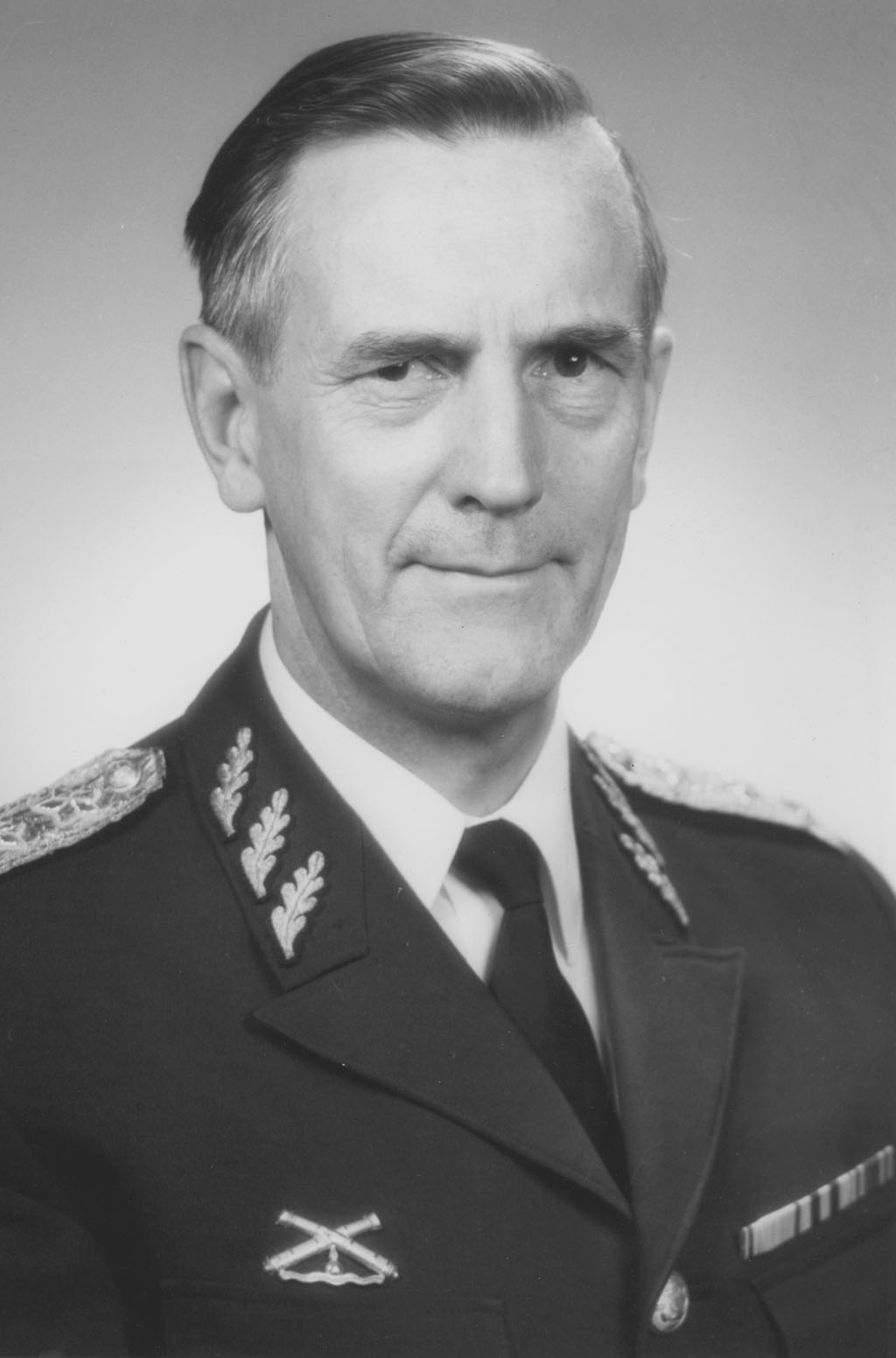
- Born: Carl Gunnar Eklund; 21 March 1920; Stockholm, Sweden
- Died: 11 January 2010 (aged 89); Danderyd, Sweden
- Burial place: Solna Cemetery
- Military career
- Allegiance: Sweden
- Branch: Coastal Artillery (Swedish Navy)
- Service years: 1941–1982
- Rank: Lieutenant General
- Commands: Gotland Coastal Artillery Defence with Gotland Coastal Artillery Corps; Härnösand Coastal Artillery Corps; Naval Command North; Norrland Coastal Artillery Defence; Chief of Staff, Milo NN; Chief of the Naval Staff; Chief of the Defence Staff; Eastern Military District; Commandant General in Stockholm

Lieutenant General Carl Gunnar Eklund (21 March 1920 – 11 January 2010) was a senior Swedish Coastal Artillery officer. Eklund's military journey began in 1941 when he became a second lieutenant in the Gotland Coastal Artillery Corps. Over the years, he steadily climbed the ranks, demonstrating a strong interest in technology. He attended the Royal Swedish Naval Staff College and later became a captain. His service included teaching roles at military colleges, and he attained the rank of major in 1957. Eklund also held significant positions, including heading the Defence Staff's Research Department and serving as a commanding officer in various coastal artillery units. His military career culminated in his role as Chief of the Defence Staff and as a military commander.

Apart from his military service, Eklund was actively involved in various organizations, including shooting associations and editorial roles in military journals. He was part of the Swedish delegation in the Disarmament Conference in Geneva, served as chairman of the Swedish Military Sports Association, and held leadership roles in esteemed military and defense-related associations. Even after retirement, he continued his involvement in officer associations and local politics in Danderyd from 1983 to 1988.

== Early life ==
Eklund was born on 21 March 1920 in Stockholm, the son of lieutenant Carl Eklund and his wife Sally (née Karlsson). As a child in a non-commissioned officer family in the Coastal Artillery, he moved between different garrisons from an early age, but he passed studentexamen in Stockholm in 1938.

== Career ==
=== Military career ===
Eklund became second lieutenant in the Gotland Coastal Artillery Corps (KA 3) in 1941 and during his first years, he served in units with high preparedness in Stockholm's outer archipelago and he was promoted to lieutenant in 1943. He had a strong interest in technology and attended the Royal Swedish Naval Staff College from 1946 to 1947 and passed its staff and artillery course from 1947 to 1949 and was promoted to captain in 1948. He served in the Defence Staff and was teacher at the Royal Swedish Naval Staff College from 1949 to 1954 as well as served as acting teacher at the Swedish National Defence College from 1952 to 1954. Eklund was a teacher of tactics at the Royal Swedish Naval Staff College from 1954 to 1958 and attended the Swedish Infantry Combat School in 1957 and was promoted to major the same year.

Eklund was head of the Defence Staff's Research Department from 1958 to 1961 and attended the Swedish National Defence College in 1959. In 1960 he was promoted to lieutenant colonel. He was then chief of staff of the Inspector of the Coastal Artillery from 1961 to 1962 when he promoted to colonel. Eklund was appointed commanding officer of the Gotland Coastal Artillery Defence (KA 3) in 1962 and two years later in 1964 he was appointed commanding officer of the Naval Command North (Marinkommando Nord), Norrland Coastal Artillery Defence (Norrlands kustartilleriförsvar) and Härnösand Coastal Artillery Corps (KA 5).

He was promoted to senior colonel in 1966 and was chief of staff of the Lower Norrland Military District (Milo NN) from 1966 to 1970. On 1 October 1970, Eklund assumed the position of Chief of the Naval Staff and promoted to major general. Eklund was Chief of the Defence Staff from 1 October 1972 to 30 September 1976 and then military commander of the Eastern Military District (Milo Ö) as well as Commandant General in Stockholm from 1 October 1976 to 1982 when he retired from active service.

=== Other work ===
Eklund was a member of Gotland's Coastal Artillery Corps' shooting association from 1942, member of the board and leader of the pistol shooting section leader, and member of the Vaxholm Coastal Artillery Regiment's shooting association and the Royal Swedish Naval Academy's shooting association. Eklund was editor of the journal Kustartilleriet ("The Coastal Artillery") from 1954 to 1960 and co-editor of Öst och Väst och Vi in 1957. He was a board member of the Marinlitteraturföreningen ("Naval Literature Association") and the Försvarspolitiskt forum ("Defence Policy Forum Association"). Eklund became a member of the Royal Swedish Society of Naval Sciences in 1962 and in 1966 he became a member of the Royal Swedish Academy of War Sciences. Eklund was a member of the Swedish delegation in the Disarmament Conference in Geneva from 1963 to 1965 and chairman of the Section II, Naval Warfare Studies of the Royal Swedish Academy of War Sciences from 1970 to 1972 as well as military expert in the 1972 Defence Investigation. Furthermore, Eklund was chairman of the Swedish Military Sports Association (Sveriges militära idrottsförbund) from 1972 to 1984 and he was president of the Royal Swedish Academy of War Sciences from 1982 to 1985. After his retirement, he worked as chairman of the Officers' Association for Older Officers (Officersföreningen för äldre officerare) and in the Retired Officers Association (Föreningen Pensionerade Officerare). He was also elected municipal politician in Danderyd from 1983 to 1988.

== Personal life ==
On 31 December 1942 he married Marianne Cecil Elisabet von Malmborg (1920–2004), the daughter of captain Nils von Malmborg and Torborg Vidinghoff. He was the father of Carl (born 1944), Nils (born 1944) and Bertil (born 1948). Nils was colonel in the Swedish Coastal Artillery and his last position before retiring was as acting head of the Swedish Armed Forces's internal audit.

== Death ==
Eklund died on 11 January 2010 in Danderyd and the funeral service took place in Danderyd Church on 12 February 2010. He was buried at Solna Cemetery on 21 March 2010.

== Dates of rank ==
- 1941 – Second lieutenant
- 1943 – Lieutenant
- 1948 – Captain
- 1957 – Major
- 1960 – Lieutenant colonel
- 1962 – Colonel
- 1966 – Senior colonel
- 1970 – Major general
- 1 October 1972 – Lieutenant general

== Awards and decorations ==
=== Swedish ===
- (Sweden) Commander 1st Class of the Order of the Sword (6 June 1969)
- (Sweden) Commander of the Order of the Sword (6 June 1966)
- (Sweden) Knight of the Order of the Sword (1959)
- (Sweden) Royal Swedish Academy of War Sciences Commemorative Medal

=== Foreign ===
- Commander Grand Cross of the Order of the Lion of Finland

Military offices
Preceded by Lars-Fritiof Melin	Chief of Staff of the Lower Norrland Military District; 1966–1970	Succeeded by Bo Varenius
Preceded by Bo Westin	Chief of the Naval Staff; 1970–1972	Succeeded by Bo Varenius
Preceded by Bo Westin	Chief of the Defence Staff; 1972–1976	Succeeded by Lennart Ljung
Preceded by Nils Sköld	Eastern Military District (Milo Ö); 1976–1982	Succeeded by Bengt Lehander
Preceded by Nils Sköld	Commandant General in Stockholm; 1976–1982	Succeeded by Bengt Lehander
Professional and academic associations
Preceded by Gunnar Thyresson	President of the Royal Swedish Academy of War Sciences; 1982–1985	Succeeded by Per Sköld
