= Hova, Sweden =

Hova
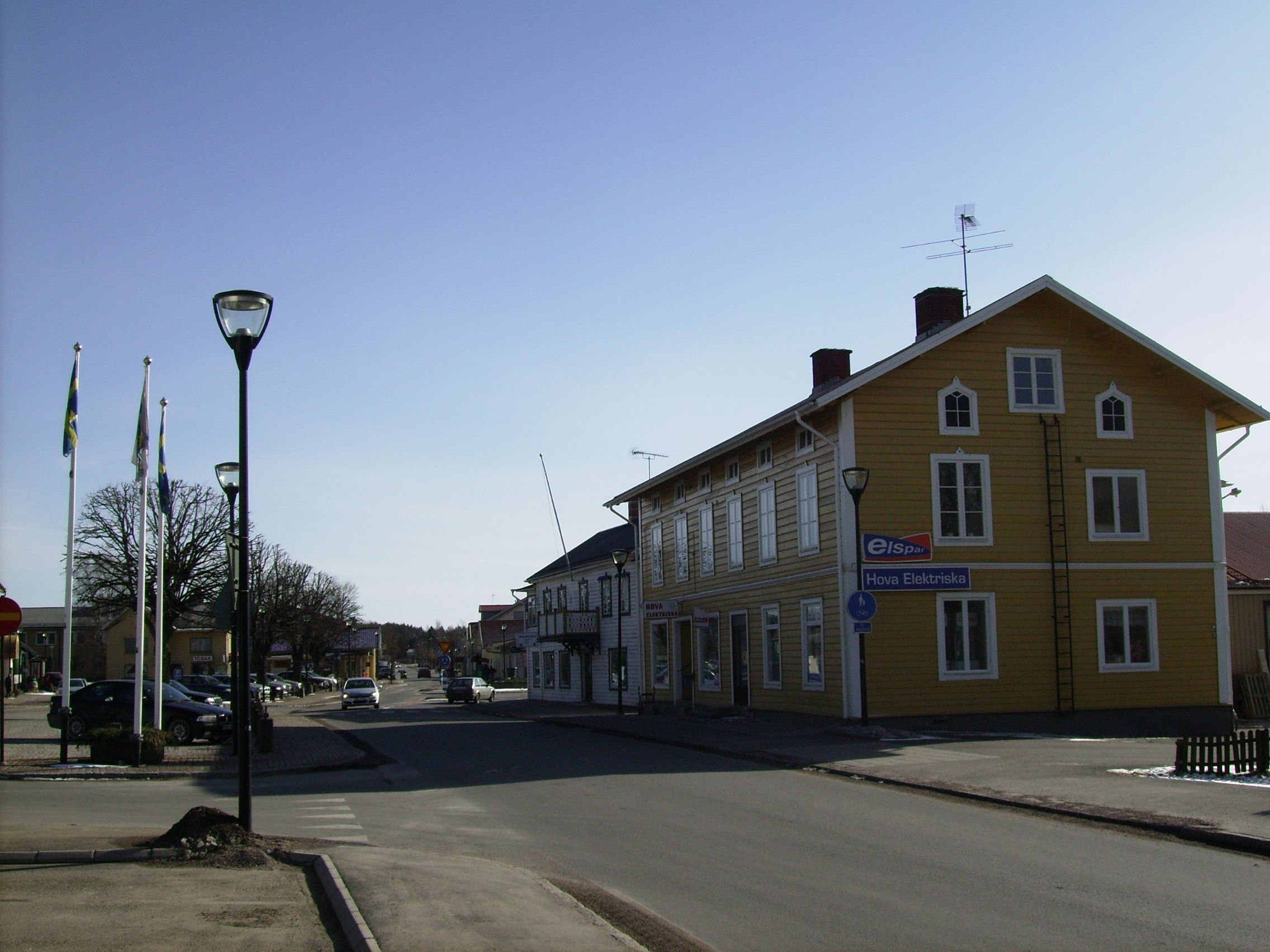
- Central Hova

- Location within Västra Götaland Location within Sweden
- Coordinates: 58°51′N 14°13′E
- Country: Sweden
- Province: Västergötland
- County: Västra Götaland County
- Municipality: Gullspång Municipality

Area
  - Total: 1.80 km^{2} (0.69 sq mi)

Population (31 December 2010)
  - Total: 1,288
  - Density: 716/km^{2} (1,850/sq mi)
- Time zone: UTC+1 (CET)
  - Summer (DST): UTC+2 (CEST)

Hova (Swedish pronunciation: [ˈhûːva]) is a locality and one of the two seats of Gullspång Municipality, Västra Götaland County, Sweden, the other is Gullspång. It had 1,288 inhabitants in 2010.

== Overview ==
The main part of the municipal administration is located in Hova, thus constituting the municipal seat. However, the municipality avoids the term seat (centralort) due to the rivalry between Hova and Gullspång some 20 km north-west. Instead it is called one of the municipality's two "main localities".

== Culture ==
Celebrities from Hova include August Olsson and Stikkan Anderson, manager of Swedish pop band ABBA and co-founder of Polar Music, who grew up there. A statue in the town square of Hova commemorates his accomplishments.

Each summer Hova hosts a renaissance fair whose theme is the Battle of Hova in 1275.
