= Bo Varenius =

Swedish Coastal Artillery officer

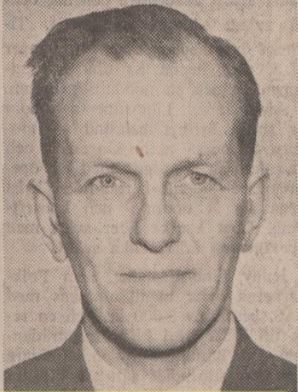
- Born: Bo Gerhard Otto Varenius; 3 November 1918; Stockholm, Sweden
- Died: 23 July 1996 (aged 77); Danderyd, Sweden
- Burial place: Galärvarvskyrkogården
- Military career
- Allegiance: Sweden
- Branch: Coastal Artillery (Swedish Navy)
- Service years: 1943–1984
- Rank: Major General
- Commands: Gotland Coastal Artillery Regiment; Section 1, Defence Staff; Chief of Staff, Milo NN; Chief of the Naval Staff

Major General Bo Gerhard Otto Varenius (3 November 1918 – 23 July 1996) was a senior Swedish Coastal Artillery officer. Varenius served as Chief of the Naval Staff from 1972 to 1984.

== Early life ==
Varenius was born on 3 November 1918 in Hedvig Eleonora Parish, Stockholm, Sweden, the son of professor Otto Varenius and his wife Gurli Lindbäck. Varenius passed studentexamen from the Latinlinjen in Stockholm in 1938, after which he began studying law at Stockholm University College and supplemented his studentexamen with science subjects. From 1939 to 1942, he did his military service and reserve officer training in the Swedish Coastal Artillery, from which he receives a reserve officer degree in 1942. He felt at home in the archipelago environment and saw it as a challenge to work with the problems with coastal defence. Varenius thus let go of the idea of studying law.

== Career ==
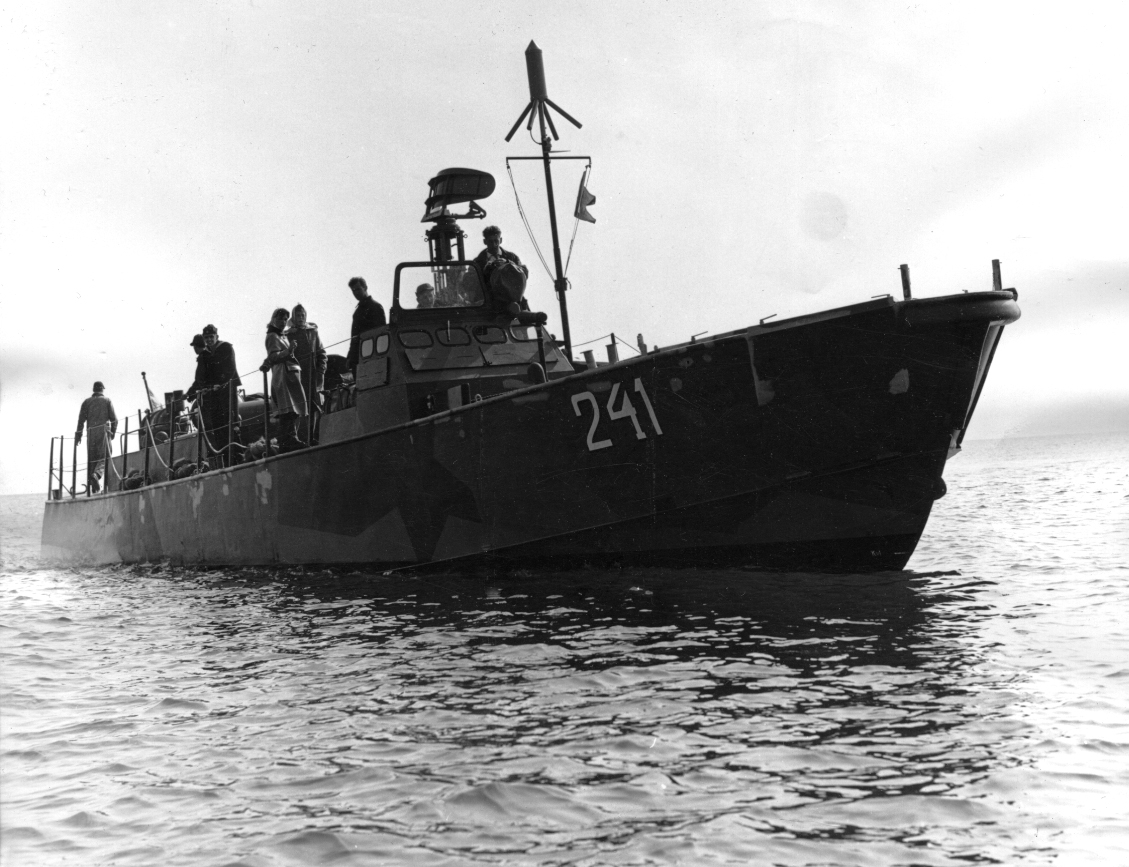
Colonel Varenius at the helm (left in the wheelhouse) on his way to Gotska Sandön in 1965.

Varenius was commissioned as an officer in 1943 with the rank of second lieutenant. He was promoted lieutenant in 1944. During his first years as an officer, he served in troop and staff positions in Karlskrona Coastal Artillery Regiment. He attended the Staff Course and the Naval Mine Course at the Royal Swedish Naval Staff College from 1950 to 1952 and he was promoted to captain in 1951 and served in the Naval Staff from 1956 to 1957. Varenius was promoted to major in 1960 and served in the Royal Swedish Naval Materiel Administration from 1960 to 1961, and then as head of department in the Defence Staff from 1961 to 1963 and attended the Swedish National Defence College in 1962. He was promoted to lieutenant colonel in 1963 and was posted as head of the Coordination Department in the Ministry of Defence from 1963 to 1964.

In 1964, Varenius was promoted to colonel, after which he served as commander of Gotland Coastal Artillery Defence with Gotland Coastal Artillery Corps between 1 October 1964 to 30 September 1966. He then served from 1966 to 1970 as head of Section 1 in the Defence Staff, with responsibility for the Quartermaster Department and signal service. Varenius served as chief of staff of the Lower Norrland Military District from 1970 to 1972 when he was promoted to major general and appointed Chief of the Naval Staff. During his twelve years as Chief of the Naval Staff, Varenius participated in the major changes in the naval war organization during the transition from the destroyer era to the missile age, as well as from older coastal artillery batteries and mine units to fixed and mobile coastal artillery units. Varenius retired in 1984. After his retirement, he was the CEO of the humanitarian foundation SCAA.

== Personal life ==
In 1945, Varenius married the Sophia sister Lilian Koch (born 1921), the daughter of naval commander Harry Koch and Elisabeth (née Paulin). He was the father of Ann (1946–2008), Nils (born 1949), Helene (born 1950) and Björn (born 1954).

Varenius was a member of Rotary.

== Death ==
Varenius died on 14 August 1996 in Danderyd. He was interred on 5 September 1996 at Galärvarvskyrkogården in Stockholm.

== Dates of rank ==
- 1943 – Second lieutenant
- 1944 – Lieutenant
- 1951 – Captain
- 1960 – Major
- 1963 – Lieutenant colonel
- 1964 – Colonel
- 1972 – Major general

== Awards and decorations ==
- (Sweden) Commander 1st Class of the Order of the Sword (6 June 1970)
- (Sweden) Commander of the Order of the Sword (11 November 1967)
- (Sweden) Knight of the Order of the Sword (1960)

== Honours ==
- Member of the Royal Swedish Academy of War Sciences (1971)
- Honorary member of the Royal Swedish Society of Naval Sciences (1972)

Military offices
Preceded by Gunnar Eklund	Section 1 of the Defence Staff; 1964–1966	Succeeded by Erik Lyth
Preceded by Fredrik Löwenhielm	Section 1 of the Defence Staff; 1966–1970	Succeeded by Sigvard Månsson
Preceded by Gunnar Eklund	Chief of Staff of the Lower Norrland Military District; 1970–1972	Succeeded by Gustaf Peyron
Preceded by Gunnar Eklund	Chief of the Naval Staff; 1972–1984	Succeeded by Torsten Engberg
