= Gullspång Municipality =

Gullspång Municipality Gullspångs kommun
- Municipality
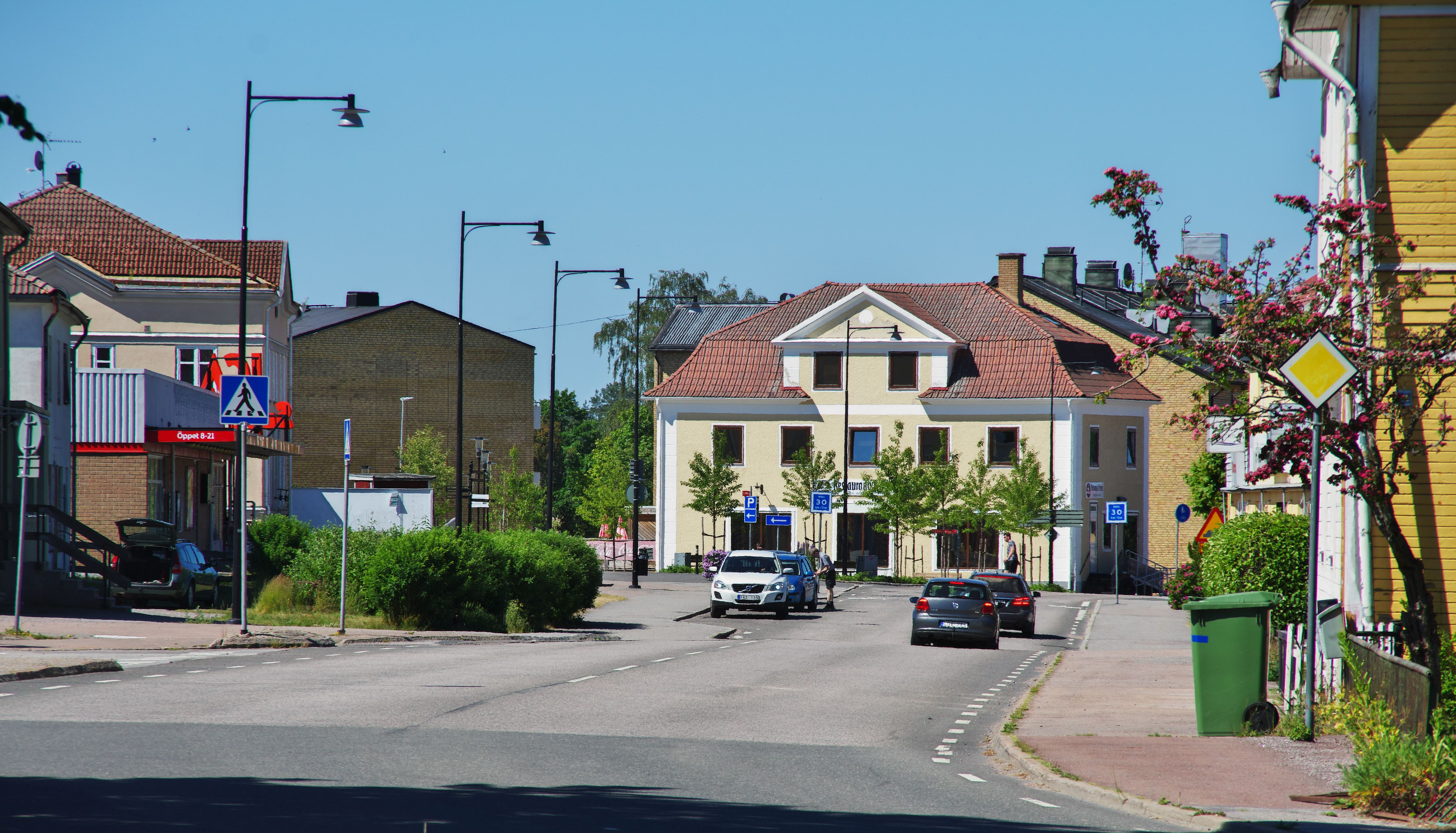

- Coat of arms

- Coordinates: 58°59′N 14°07′E
- Country: Sweden
- County: Västra Götaland County
- Seat: Gullspång and Hova

Area
  - Total: 554.95 km^{2} (214.27 sq mi)
  - Land: 312.89 km^{2} (120.81 sq mi)
  - Water: 242.06 km^{2} (93.46 sq mi)
- Area as of 1 January 2014.

Population (30 June 2025)
  - Total: 4,984
  - Density: 15.93/km^{2} (41.26/sq mi)
- Time zone: UTC+1 (CET)
  - Summer (DST): UTC+2 (CEST)
- ISO 3166 code: SE
- Province: Västergötland and Värmland
- Municipal code: 1447
- Website: www.gullspang.se
- Density is calculated using land area only.

Gullspång Municipality (Swedish: Gullspångs kommun) is a municipality in Västra Götaland County in western Sweden. Its seat is located in the towns of Gullspång and Hova.

The present municipality was formed through the amalgamation of the former entities of Amnehärad, Hova and part of Visnum. The name was taken from the locality Gullspång.

== Geography ==
Gullspång Municipality borders to Mariestad Municipality and Töreboda Municipality in Västra Götaland County It also borders on Laxå Municipality in Örebro County to the east and on Kristinehamn Municipality in Värmland County to the north.

The southern part of the municipality contains the northern part of Swedish national park Tiveden.

=== Localities ===
- Gullspång
- Gårdsjö
- Hova
- Otterbäcken
- Skagersvik

The two main towns are Hova and Gullspång. The central administration is placed in Hova, thus constituting the municipal seat, but there are also offices in Gullspång. Because of the rivalry between Gullspång and Hova the municipality prefers to call them the "two main localities" ("huvudtätorter").

== Demographics ==
This is a demographic table based on Gullspång Municipality's electoral districts in the 2022 Swedish general election sourced from SVT's election platform, in turn taken from SCB official statistics.

In total there were 5,203 residents, including 4,029 Swedish citizens of voting age. 47.3% voted for the left coalition and 50.9% for the right coalition. Indicators are in percentage points except population totals and income.

Location	Residents	Citizen adults	Left vote	Right vote	Employed	Swedish parents	Foreign heritage	Income SEK	Degree
Location			%	%					
Amnehärads N	2,048	1,543	54.9	43.1	75	75	25	20,852	23
Amnehärads S	1,008	851	46.5	52.3	76	83	17	24,330	21
Hova	2,147	1,635	39.3	58.7	75	80	20	21,343	24
Source: SVT

== Local churches ==
- Södra Råda Old Church
