= Janne Nilsson =

Swedish politician (1882–1938)

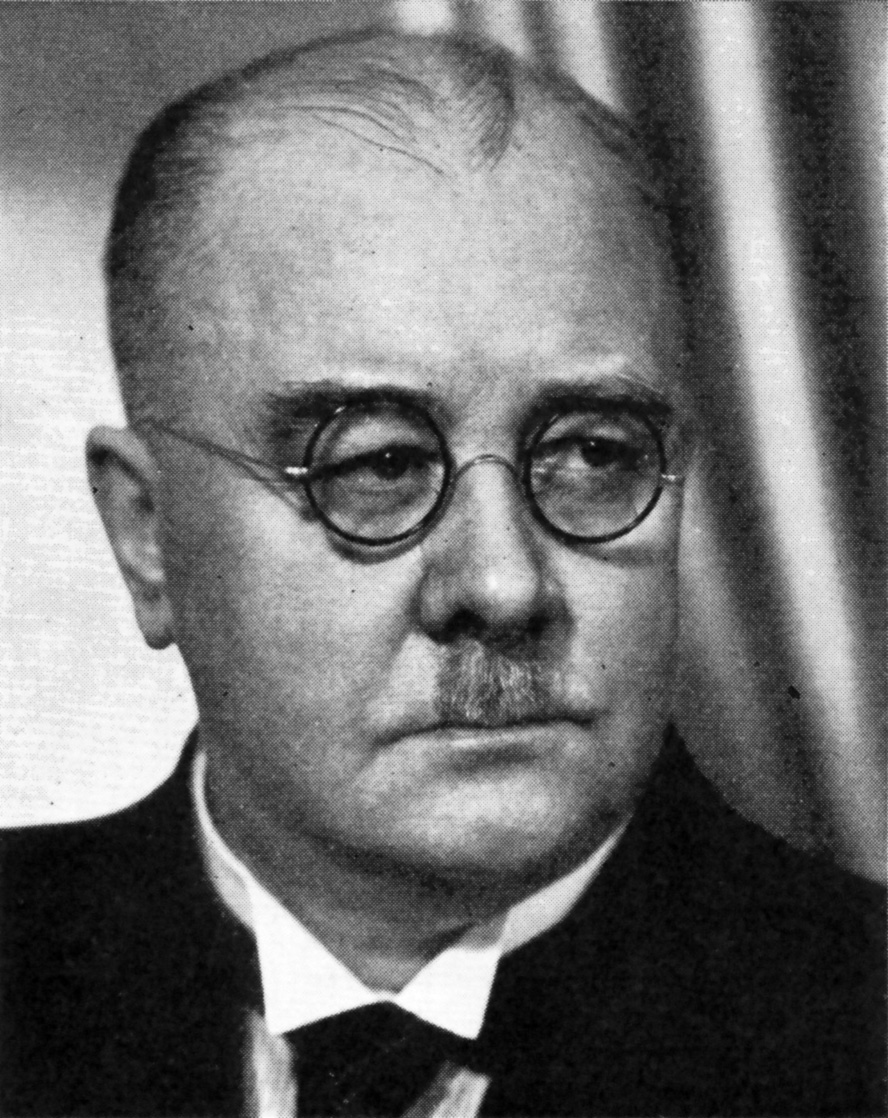

Minister of Defense
- In office 19 June 1936 – 9 December 1938
- Prime Minister: Per Albin Hansson
- Preceded by: Ivar Vennerström
- Succeeded by: Edvin Sköld

Personal details
- Born: 17 May 1882 Hörby, Sweden
- Died: 9 December 1938 (aged 56) Stockholm, Sweden
- Party: Agrarian Party

Janne Nilsson (1882–1938) was a Swedish politician who was a member of the Parliament and the minister of defense between 1936 and 1938.

== Biography ==
Nilsson was born in Hörby on 17 May 1882. He was a member of the Agrarian Party. He was appointed minister of defense in the coalition government led by Prime Minister Per Albin Hansson on 19 June 1936.

He died of cerebral hemorrhage in Stockholm on 9 December 1938 while serving as the minister of defense. His successor was a social democratic politician Edvin Sköld.
