= Ivar Vennerström =

Swedish politician (1881–1945)

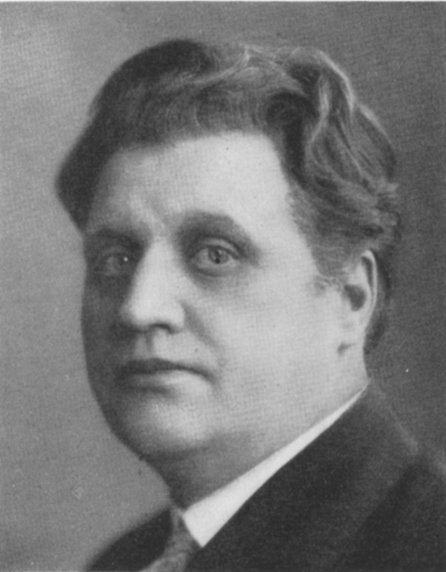
Ivar Vennerström

Ivar Teodor Vennerström (1881 - 1945) was a Swedish Social Democratic politician, member of the Riksdag 1915 - 1936. Vennerström joined the left opposition of the Swedish Social Democratic Party in the split of 1917, and initially supported the Bolshevik revolution in Russia. But Vennerström opposed the Twenty-one Conditions of the Communist International and left the Left Party in 1921 as it became the Communist Party of Sweden. Vennerström rejoined the Social Democratic Party in 1924 and he was made Minister for Defence 1932 - 1936.

Preceded by Anton Rundqvist	Swedish Minister for Defence; 1932–1936	Succeeded by Janne Nilsson
