= Bo Westin =

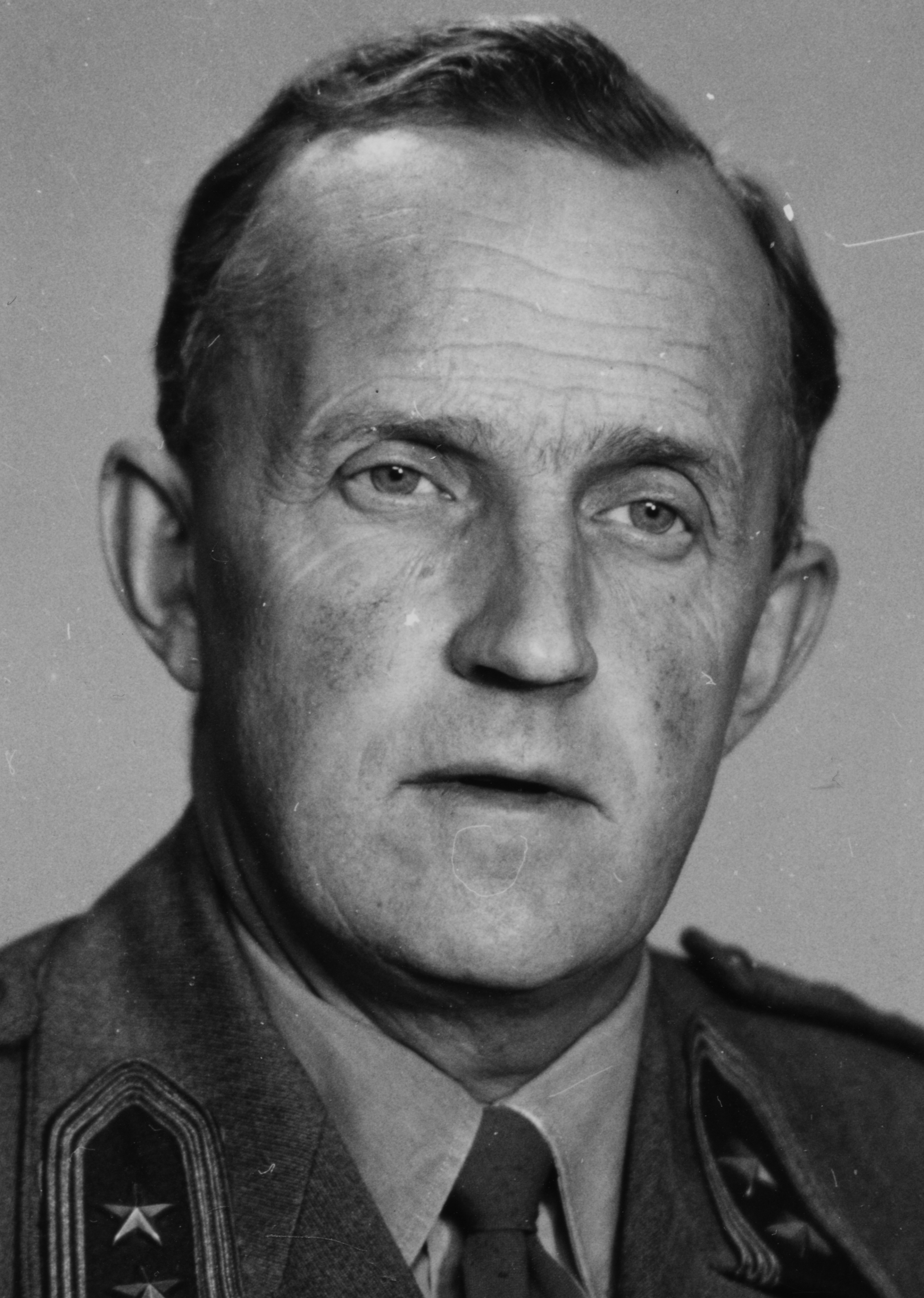
- Born: Bo Lars Axel Westin; 12 September 1913; Norrköping, Sweden
- Died: 17 January 2009 (aged 95); Stockholm, Sweden
- Burial place: Lidingö Cemetery
- Military career
- Allegiance: Sweden
- Branch: Coastal Artillery (Swedish Navy)
- Service years: 1937–1978
- Rank: Lieutenant General
- Commands: Vice Chief of the Defence Staff; Chief of the Naval Staff; Chief of the Defence Staff; Swedish National Defence College
- Awards: Knight of the Order of the Sword

Lieutenant General Bo Lars Axel Westin (12 September 1913 – 17 January 2009) was a Swedish Coastal Artillery officer. Westin was Chief of the Naval Staff from 1968 to 1970 and Chief of the Defence Staff from 1970 to 1972.

== Early life ==
Westin was born on 12 September 1913 in Norrköping Saint Olof Parish in Norrköping, Sweden, the son of accountant Axel Westin and his wife Gottfrida "Frida" (née Nilsson). He passed studentexamen in 1933.

== Career ==
=== Military career ===
Westin enrolled at the Royal Swedish Naval Academy where he graduated as second lieutenant in Karlskrona Coastal Artillery Regiment (KA 2) in 1937. He focused early on anti-aircraft artillery and was placed early as a teacher at various artillery schools through his technical and mathematical orientation. Westin was promoted to lieutenant in 1939 and served in the Defence Staff in 1943 and passed the general course of the Royal Swedish Naval Staff College in 1944 and was promoted to captain in 1945. He passed the artillery course of the Royal Swedish Naval Staff College in 1946 and he was a teacher at the Royal Swedish Naval Academy from 1946 to 1948.

Westin served at the Swedish Missile Defence Agency (Försvarets robotvapenbyrå) within the Royal Swedish Air Force Materiel Administration in 1949 and he was a teacher at the Royal Swedish Naval Staff College from 1949 to 1950. Westin was promoted to major in 1951 and served as deputy defence attaché in Washington, D.C., United States from 1951 to 1953. He served in the Royal Swedish Naval Materiel Administration in 1955 and in the Naval Staff from 1956 to 1957 when he was promoted to lieutenant colonel. Westin was appointed Inspector of the Swedish Coastal Artillery in 1958 and studied at the Swedish National Defence College the same year. He was then promoted to colonel in 1961 and was also appointed chief of Section II (Attaché, Intelligence and Domestic Department) in the Defence Staff.

Westin was an intellectual officer with great analytical ability, and he went on to become influential when it came to transforming the old coastal artillery to modern systems. In the 1960s there was a schism within the Swedish Armed Forces on how the future air defense would be designed. Westin was appointed chairman of a comprehensive composite investigation, and after two years, he succeeded in presenting a completely unanimous proposal. Westin was section chief in the Defence Staff from 1961 to 1966 when he was promoted to major general and he was then Vice Chief there and head of the Operations Command from 1966 to 1968. He was promoted to lieutenant general in 1969 and was the Chief of the Naval Staff from 1968 to 1970 before assuming the position of Chief of the Defence Staff on 1 October 1970. In June 1972 he visited Cyprus and had meetings with Archbishop Makarios, Vice President Fazıl Küçük, the Secretary-General's Special Representative in Cyprus, Mr. Osorio-Tafall, the Force Commander, Major General Dewan Prem Chand as well as the Swedish Contingent. Westin retired from active service the same year. He was then head of the Swedish National Defence College from 1972 to 1978.

=== Other work ===
He was also expert in the 1954 and 1957 Supreme Commander Investigations. Westin was a member of the Parliamentary Defense Preparation (Parlamentariska försvarsberedningen) from 1955 to 1957, the 1957 Navy Missile Committee and the 1957 Helicopter Committee. He was also chairman of the Air Defense Investigation (Luftförsvarsutredningen) from 1967 to 1969. Westin was a board member of the National Society for Road Safety (NTF) and Statens allmänna bevakning AB.

== Personal life ==
In 1939 he married Karin Rydin, the daughter of veterinarian Karl Rydin and Karin Boëthius. He was the father of Agneta (born 1941). Westin was very versatile: he was interested in sports and played himself tennis, table tennis, football and bandy. He was fond of P. G. Wodehouse and became a member of the Woodhouse Society and he loved jazz. He was a consultant in Svenskt visarkiv 1980-1993 and wrote books about, among others, Thore Ehrling, Stig Holm, Skånska Lasse, Benny Goodman and Gösta Törner. He was also chairman of the Evert Taube Society (Evert Taube-sällskapet) from 1989 to 1993. He was also a formidable tomato grower, and his balcony in Lidingö was like a veritable greenhouse.

== Death ==
Westin died on 17 January 2009 in Saint John Parish in Stockholm. The funeral service was held on 25 April 2019 in Lidingö Church. He was buried at Lidingö Cemetery on 9 March 2009.

== Dates of rank ==
- 1937 – Second lieutenant
- 1939 – Lieutenant
- 1945 – Captain
- 1951 – Major
- 1957 – Lieutenant colonel
- 1961 – Colonel
- 1966 – Major general
- 1969 – Lieutenant general

== Awards and decorations ==
- (Sweden) Commander Grand Cross of the Order of the Sword (6 June 1973)
- (Sweden) Commander 1st Class of the Order of the Sword (6 June 1968)
- (Sweden) Commander of the Order of the Sword (4 June 1965)

== Honours ==
- Member of the Royal Swedish Society of Naval Sciences (1954)
- Member of the Royal Swedish Academy of War Sciences (1959)

== Bibliography ==
- Westin, Bo (1991). Från Skånska Lasse till Benny Goodman. Publikationer från Jazzavdelningen, Svenskt visarkiv, 0281-5567; 7 (in Swedish). Hedemora: Gidlund. ISBN 91-7844-187-0. SELIBR 7668552.
- Westin, Bo (1993). Gösta Törner: musikanare, tecknare. Publikationer från Jazzavdelningen, Svenskt visarkiv, 0281-5567; 10 (in Swedish). Stockholm: Svenskt visarkiv. ISBN 91-85374-26-1. SELIBR 7748508.
- Westin, Bo (1987). Säg det med musik: Thore Ehrling och hans orkester. Publikationer från Jazzavdelningen, Svenskt visarkiv, 0281-5567; 5 (in Swedish). Stockholm: Gidlund i samarbete med STIM. ISBN 91-7844-102-1. SELIBR 98698.
- Westin, Bo (1989). Stig Holm: Sveriges meste pianist. Publikationer från Jazzavdelningen, Svenskt visarkiv, 0281-5567; 6 (in Swedish). Stockholm: Svenskt visarkiv. ISBN 91-85374-22-9. SELIBR 7748505.
- Westin, Bo, ed. (1976). Försvarshögskolan 1951–1976 (in Swedish). Stockholm: Utg. SELIBR 197569.
- Westin, Bo (1944). Skjutning med Kustartilleriets automatkanoner (in Swedish). [s.l.]: [s.n.] SELIBR 8237928.

Military offices
Preceded by Bengt Lundvall	Vice Chief of the Defence Staff; 1966–1968	Succeeded by Dick Stenberg
Preceded by Henrik Lange	Chief of the Naval Staff; 1968–1970	Succeeded by Gunnar Eklund
Preceded by Stig Synnergren	Chief of the Defence Staff; 1970–1972	Succeeded by Gunnar Eklund
Preceded by Claës Skoglund	Swedish National Defence College; 1972–1978	Succeeded by Bengt Liljestrand
