= Gullspångsälven =

Coordinates: 59°01′N 14°04′E

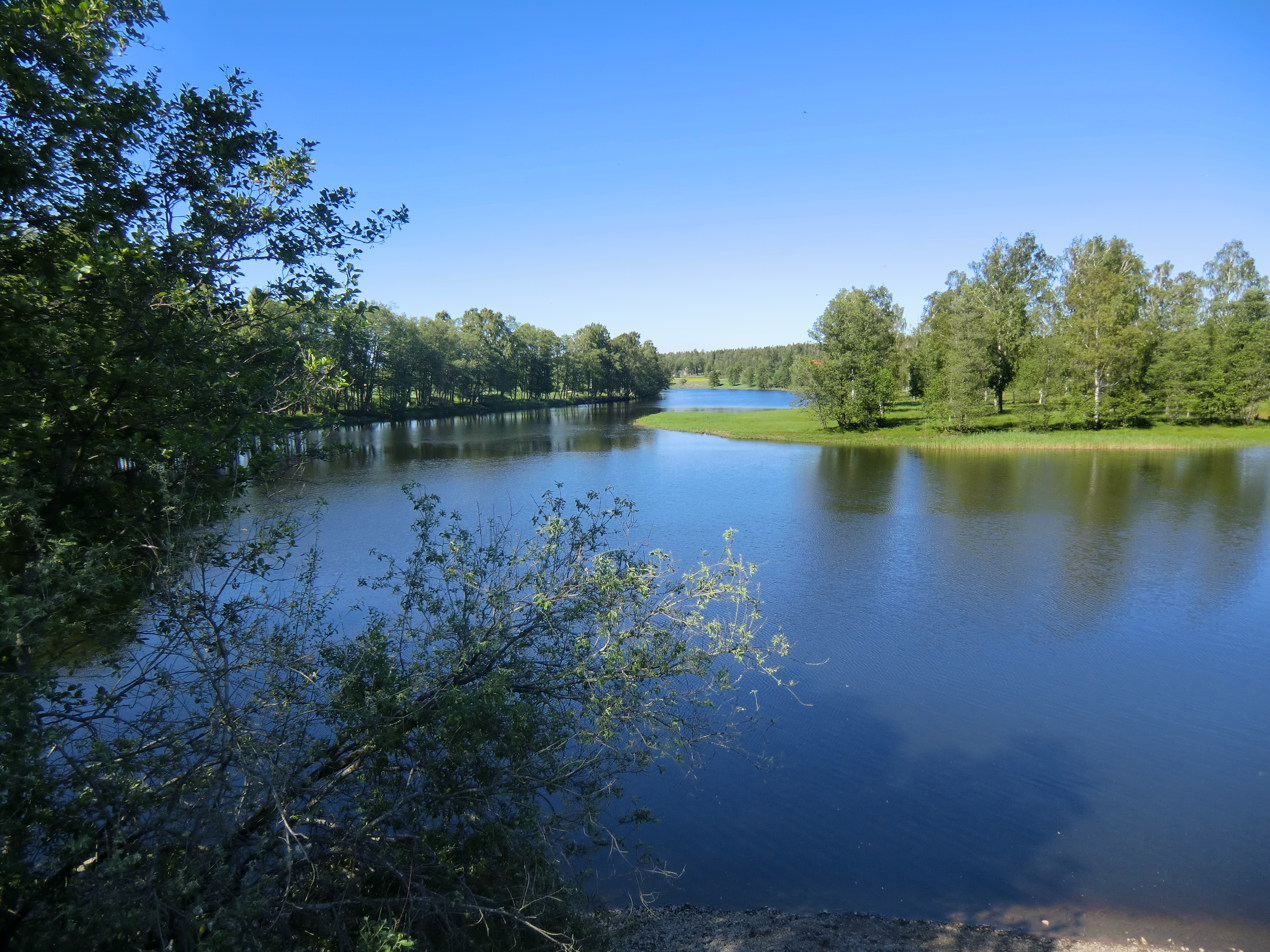
- Gullspångsälven in Gullspång

Location
- Country: Sweden

Physical characteristics
- Source: Skagern
  - elevation: 69 m (226 ft)
- Mouth: Vänern
  - elevation: 44 m (144 ft)
- Length: 8 km (5.0 mi)
- Basin size: 5,058 km^{2} (1,953 sq mi)
- Discharge
  - average: 58 m^{3}/s (2,000 cu ft/s)

Gullspångsälven is a river of southwestern Sweden. It flows for 8 kilometres through the province of Västergötland.
