= Gullspång =

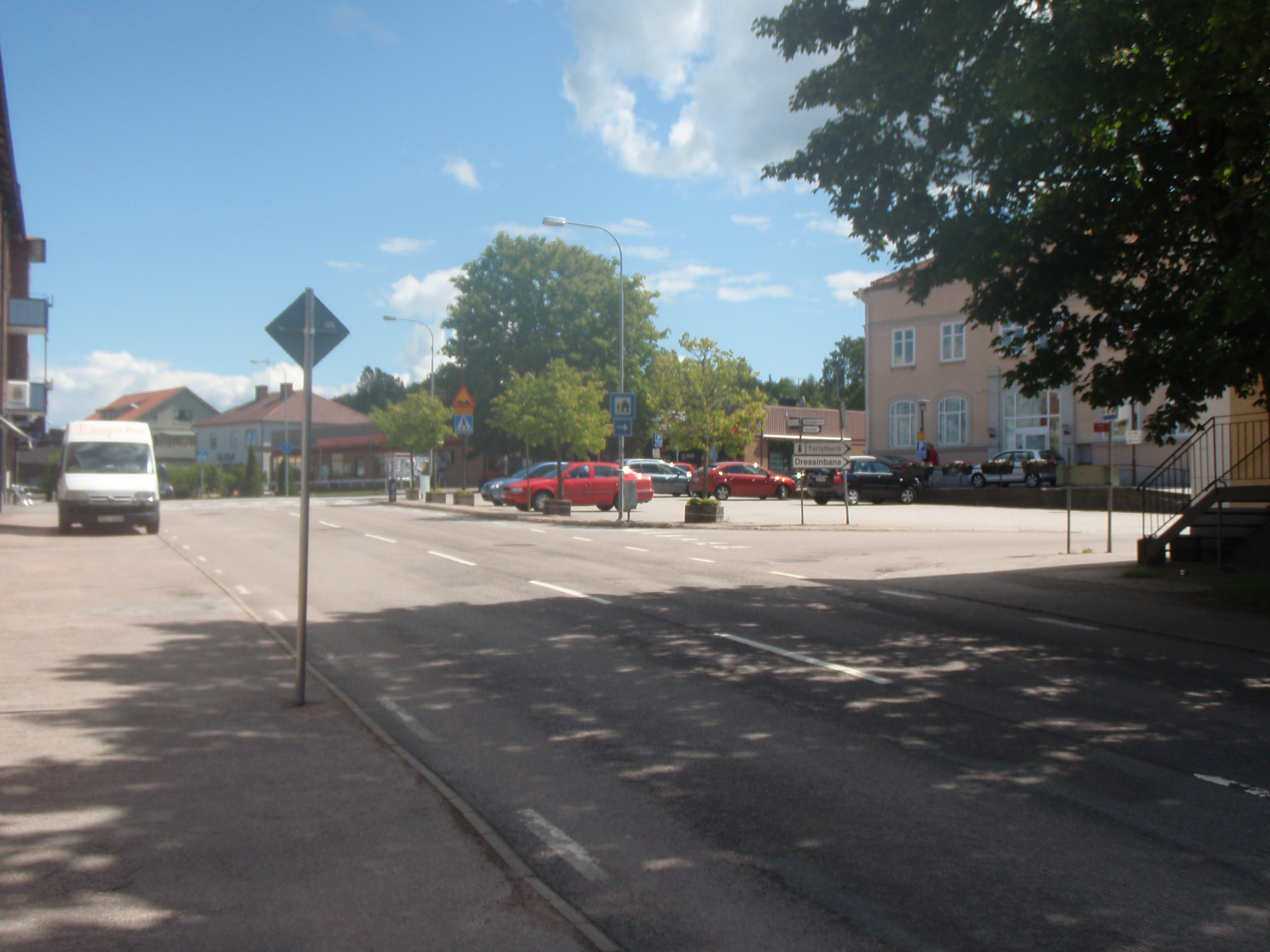
- Gullspång in 2009

- Location within Västra Götaland Location within Sweden
- Coordinates: 58°59′N 14°07′E
- Country: Sweden
- Province: Västergötland and Värmland
- County: Västra Götaland County
- Municipality: Gullspång Municipality

Area
  - Total: 1.74 km^{2} (0.67 sq mi)

Population (31 December 2010)
  - Total: 1,167
  - Density: 671/km^{2} (1,740/sq mi)
- Time zone: UTC+1 (CET)
  - Summer (DST): UTC+2 (CEST)

Gullspång is a locality and one of two seats of the Gullspång Municipality in Västra Götaland County, Sweden. As of 2010, it had 1,167 inhabitants.

== History ==
Gullspång provided the name for a new municipality created through the local government reform of 1971, but the administration was placed in the more centrally located Hova, with just some minor offices in Gullspång.

Due to the long lasting rivalry between Gullspång and Hova the municipality avoids the term centralort (seat). Instead they are called the municipality's two main localities.

== Economy ==
A major employer found in Gullspång is Partex Marking Systems, a company that manufactures markers for cables.

In Gullspång, Fortum also has a hydroelectric power plant using the water from the Skagern river to produce electricity. Fortum is quite a large employer in the town of Gullspång.

Vänerhamn AB, which has cargo ports around the entire Vänern, is a port of Otterbäcken. The port transports several million tonnes of freight each year.

== Notable people ==
From 1939 to 1954, author Frans G. Bengtsson lived in Ribbingsfors Mansion, just outside Gullspång. There he wrote many of his works and left behind many books, writings, and notes which are now located in a designated area of the municipal library.

- Linda Bengtzing, singer who was born and raised in Gullspång,
- Magnus Karlsson, speedway rider
- Peter Karlsson, speedway rider
- Mikael Max, speedway rider
- Olof Mellberg, football manager

== Salmon ==
In central Gullspång is a salmon-stair which was built in 2004. It was built to increase the population of the local Gullspång salmon ("Gullspångslax"). The salmon-stair was made possible by the installation of flood gates which filled the dry area with water from the Gullspångsälven river.
