= Minister for Defence (Sweden) =

Minister for Defence of Sweden
- Statsråd och chef för försvarsdepartementet
- Ministry coat of arms

- Command Sign

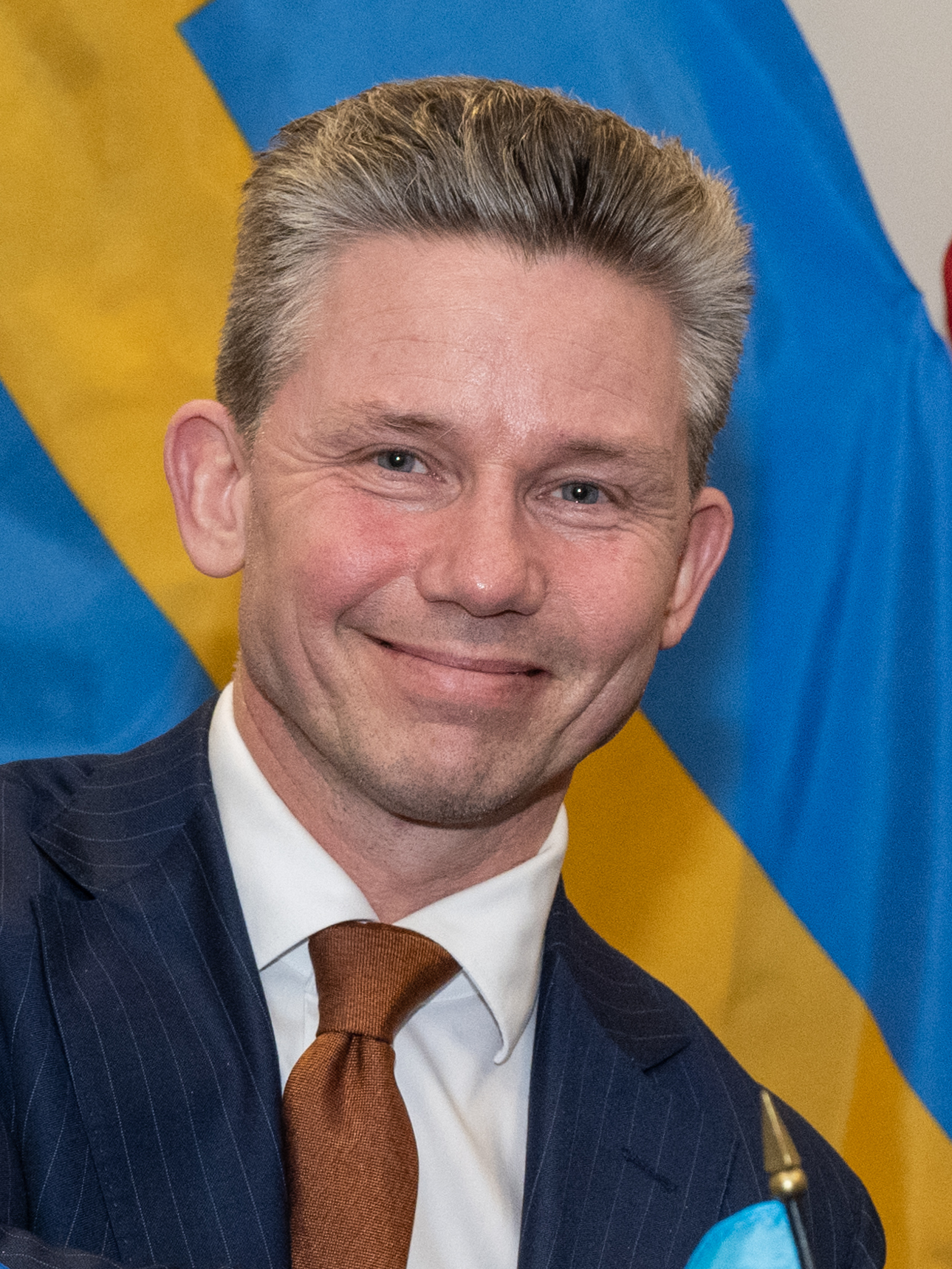
- Incumbent; Pål Jonson since 18 October 2022
- Ministry of Defence
- Style: Herr statsråd
- Member of: Government of Sweden; National Security Council
- Reports to: The Prime Minister
- Appointer: The Prime Minister was technically appointed by the King prior to 1975
- Term length: No fixed term, serves at the Prime Minister's discretion
- Inaugural holder: Per Albin Hansson
- Formation: 1920
- Deputy: State Secretary for Defence
- Website: www.sweden.gov.se/sb/d/2060

The Minister for Defence of Sweden (Swedish: försvarsminister; formal title: Swedish: statsråd och chef för försvarsdepartementet) is a member of the Government of Sweden (Swedish: Regeringen). The Minister heads the Ministry for Defence and is appointed and dismissed at the sole discretion of the prime minister of Sweden.

Although the Minister for Defence heads the Ministry of Defence, the Minister cannot as a general rule issue directives in his/her own right to the Supreme Commander or any other agency director-general in the defence portfolio due to the Swedish prohibition on ministerial rule, unless such authority is provided for in specific statutory provisions.

Between 1840 and 1920, what corresponds to the Ministry for Defence today, was divided in two separate ministries with their own minister: one for Army affairs, the Ministry of Land Defence, and one for Naval affairs, the Ministry for Naval Affairs.

The current Minister for Defence is Pål Jonson, who was appointed on 18 October 2022.

== List of Swedish Ministers for Defence ==
=== Ministers for War (1840-1920) ===
- 1840 - 1840 Bror Cederström (1780–1877)
- 1840 - 1843 Axel Otto Mörner (1774–1852)
- 1843 - 1844 Arfved Lovisin (1772–1847)
- 1844 - 1848 Gustaf Peyron (1783–1852)
- 1848 - 1853 Carl Ludvig von Hohenhausen (1787–1866)
- 1853 - 1858 Nils Gyldenstolpe (1799–1864)
- 1858 - 1862 Magnus Björnstjerna (1805–98)
- 1862 - 1867 Alexander Reuterskiöld (1804–91)
- 1867 - 1871 Gustaf Abelin (1819–1903)
- 1871 - 1877 Oscar Weidenhielm (1816–84)
- 1877 - 1880 Henrik Rosensvärd (1816–90)
- 1880 - 1882 Otto Taube (1832–1906)
- 1882 - 1887 Axel Ryding (1831–97)
- 1887 - 1888 Gustaf Oscar Peyron (1828–1915)
- 1888 - 1892 Hjalmar Palmstierna (1836–1909)
- 1892 - 1899 Axel Rappe (1838–1918)
- 1899 - 1903 Jesper Crusebjörn (1843–1904)
- 1903 - 1905 Otto Virgin (1852–1922)
- 1905 - 1907 Lars Tingsten (1857–1937), nonpolitical
- 1907 - 1907 Arvid Lindman (1862–1936), Rightist Party
- 1907 - 1911 Olof Malm (1851–1939), Rightist Party
- 1911 - 1914 David Bergström (1858–1946), Liberal
- 1914 - 1914 Hjalmar Hammarskjöld (1862–1953), nonpolitical
- 1914 - 1917 Emil Mörcke (1861–1951), nonpolitical
- 1917 - 1917 Joachim Åkerman (1868–1958), Rightist Party
- 1917 - 1920 Erik Nilson (1862–1925), Liberal
- 1920 - 1920 Per Albin Hansson (1885–1946), Social Democratic Party

=== Ministers for Naval Affairs (1840-1920) ===
- 1840 - 1844 Johan Lagerbjelke (1778–1856)
- 1844 - 1848 Carl August Gyllengranat (1787–1864)
- 1848 - 1849 Johan Fredrik Ehrenstam (1800–49)
- 1849 - 1852 Baltzar von Platen (1804–75)
- 1852 - 1857 Carl Ulner (1796–1859)
- 1857 - 1862 Carl Magnus Ehnemark (1803–74)
- 1862 - 1868 Baltzar von Platen (1804–75)
- 1868 - 1870 Magnus Thulstrup (1805–81)
- 1870 - 1874 Abraham Leijonhufvud (1823–1911)
- 1874 - 1880 Fredrik von Otter (1833–1910)
- 1880 - 1892 Carl-Gustaf von Otter (1827–1900)
- 1892 - 1898 Jarl Christersson (1833–1922)
- 1898 - 1901 Gerhard Dyrssen (1854–1938)
- 1901 - 1905 Louis Palander (1842–1920)
- 1905 - 1905 Arvid Lindman (1862–1936)
- 1905 - 1906 Ludvig Sidner (1851–1917), Liberal
- 1906 - 1907 Wilhelm Dyrssen (1858–1929), Rightist Party
- 1907 - 1910 Carl-August Ehrensvärd (1858–1933), Rightist Party
- 1910 - 1911 Henning von Krusenstierna (1862–1933), Rightist Party
- 1911 - 1914 Jacob Larsson (1851–1940), Liberal
- 1914 - 1917 Dan Boström (1870–1925), nonpolitical
- 1917 - 1917 Hans Ericson (1868–1945), Rightist Party
- 1917 - 1920 Erik Palmstierna (1877–1959), Social Democratic Party
- 1920 - 1920 Bernhard Eriksson (1878–1952), Social Democratic Party

=== Ministers for Defence (1920-) ===
Parties

No party
Social Democrat
Conservative / Moderate Party
Liberal / People's Party
Centre Party

Status

Denotes acting Minister for Defence

No.	Portrait	Minister (Born–Died)	Tenure			Political party	Cabinet
No.	Portrait	Minister (Born–Died)	Took office	Left office	Duration	Political party	Cabinet
1	Per Albin Hansson	Per Albin Hansson (1885–1946)	1 July 1920	27 October 1920	118 days	Social Democrats	Branting I Cabinet; S
2	Carl Gustaf Hammarskjöld	Carl Gustaf Hammarskjöld (1865–1940)	27 October 1920	6 June 1921	222 days	Electoral League	De Geer Cabinet; Von Sydow Cabinet
3	Otto Lybeck	Otto Lybeck (1871–1947)	6 June 1921	13 October 1921	129 days	Independent	Von Sydow Cabinet
(1)	Per Albin Hansson	Per Albin Hansson (1885–1946)	13 October 1921	19 April 1923	1 year, 188 days	Social Democrats	Branting II Cabinet; S
4	Carl Malmroth	Carl Malmroth (1874–1934)	19 April 1923	18 October 1924	1 year, 182 days	Independent	Trygger Cabinet; Electoral League
(1)	Per Albin Hansson	Per Albin Hansson (1885–1946)	18 October 1924	7 June 1926	1 year, 232 days	Social Democrats	Branting III Cabinet; Sandler Cabinet; S
5	Gustav Rosén	Gustav Rosén (1876–1942)	7 June 1926	2 October 1928	2 years, 117 days	Liberals	Ekman I Cabinet; L–L
6	Harald Malmberg	Harald Malmberg (1879–1948)	2 October 1928	7 June 1930	1 year, 248 days	Electoral League	Lindman II Cabinet; Electoral League
7	Carl Gustaf Ekman	Carl Gustaf Ekman (1872–1945)	7 June 1930	19 June 1931	1 year, 12 days	Liberals	Ekman II Cabinet; L
8	Anton Rundqvist	Anton Rundqvist (1885–1973)	19 June 1931	24 September 1932	1 year, 97 days	Independent	Hamrin Cabinet; L
9	Ivar Vennerström	Ivar Vennerström (1881–1945)	4 September 1932	19 June 1936	3 years, 269 days	Social Democrats	Hansson I Cabinet; S
10	Janne Nilsson	Janne Nilsson (1882–1938)	19 June 1936	9 December 1938	2 years, 173 days	Centre	Pehrsson-Bramstorp Cabinet; C Hansson II Cabinet; S–C
11	Per Edvin Sköld	Per Edvin Sköld (1891–1972)	16 December 1938	31 July 1945	6 years, 227 days	Social Democrats	Hansson II Cabinet; S–C; Hansson III Cabinet; S–C–M–L
12	Allan Vougt	Allan Vougt (1895–1953)	31 July 1945	1 October 1951	6 years, 62 days	Social Democrats	Hansson IV Cabinet; Erlander I Cabinet; S
13	Torsten Nilsson	Torsten Nilsson (1905–1997)	1 October 1951	22 March 1957	5 years, 172 days	Social Democrats	Erlander II Cabinet; S–C
14	Sven Andersson	Sven Andersson (1910–1987)	22 March 1957	31 October 1973	16 years, 223 days	Social Democrats	Erlander II Cabinet; S–C; Erlander III Cabinet; S Palme I Cabinet; S
15	Eric Holmqvist	Eric Holmqvist (1917–2009)	31 October 1973	8 October 1976	2 years, 343 days	Social Democrats	Palme I Cabinet; S
16	Eric Krönmark	Eric Krönmark (1931–2024)	8 October 1976	18 October 1978	2 years, 10 days	Moderate	Fälldin I Cabinet; C–M–L
17	Lars de Geer	Lars de Geer (1922–2002)	18 October 1978	12 October 1979	359 days	Liberals	Ullsten Cabinet; L
(16)	Eric Krönmark	Eric Krönmark (1931–2024)	12 October 1979	5 May 1981	1 year, 205 days	Moderate	Fälldin II Cabinet; C–M–L
–	Anders Dahlgren	Anders Dahlgren (1925–1986); Acting	5 May 1981	22 May 1981	17 days	Centre	Fälldin III Cabinet; C–L
18	Torsten Gustafsson	Torsten Gustafsson (1920–1994)	22 May 1981	8 October 1982	1 year, 139 days	Centre	Fälldin III Cabinet; C–L
19	Börje Andersson	Börje Andersson (1930–1994)	8 October 1982	1 December 1982	54 days	Social Democrats	Palme II Cabinet; S
–	Curt Boström	Curt Boström (1926–2014); Acting	1 December 1982	17 January 1983	47 days	Social Democrats	Palme II Cabinet; S
20	Anders Thunborg	Anders Thunborg (1934–2004)	17 January 1983	14 October 1985	2 years, 270 days	Social Democrats	Palme II Cabinet; S
21	Roine Carlsson	Roine Carlsson (1937–2020)	14 October 1985	4 October 1991	5 years, 355 days	Social Democrats	Palme II Cabinet; Carlsson I Cabinet; Carlsson II Cabinet; S
22	Anders Björck	Anders Björck (born 1944)	4 October 1991	7 October 1994	3 years, 3 days	Moderate	Bildt Cabinet; M–C–L–KD
23	Thage G. Peterson	Thage G. Peterson (born 1933)	7 October 1994	1 February 1997	2 years, 117 days	Social Democrats	Carlsson III Cabinet; S Persson Cabinet; S
24	Björn von Sydow	Björn von Sydow (born 1945)	1 February 1997	30 September 2002	5 years, 241 days	Social Democrats	Persson Cabinet; S
–	Lena Hjelm-Wallén	Lena Hjelm-Wallén (born 1943); Acting	30 September 2002	22 October 2002	22 days	Social Democrats	Persson Cabinet; S
–	Pär Nuder	Pär Nuder (born 1963); Acting	22 October 2002	4 November 2002	13 days	Social Democrats	Persson Cabinet; S
25	Leni Björklund	Leni Björklund (born 1944)	4 November 2002	6 October 2006	3 years, 336 days	Social Democrats	Persson Cabinet; S
26	Mikael Odenberg	Mikael Odenberg (born 1953)	6 October 2006	5 September 2007	334 days	Moderate	Reinfeldt Cabinet; M–C–L–KD
27	Sten Tolgfors	Sten Tolgfors (born 1966)	5 September 2007	29 March 2012	4 years, 206 days	Moderate	Reinfeldt Cabinet; M–C–L–KD
–	Catharina Elmsäter-Svärd	Catharina Elmsäter-Svärd (born 1963); Acting	29 March 2012	18 April 2012	20 days	Moderate	Reinfeldt Cabinet; M–C–L–KD
28	Karin Enström	Karin Enström (born 1966)	18 April 2012	3 October 2014	2 years, 168 days	Moderate	Reinfeldt Cabinet; M–C–L–KD
29	Peter Hultqvist	Peter Hultqvist (born 1958)	3 October 2014	18 October 2022	8 years, 15 days	Social Democrats	Löfven I Cabinet–II–III; S–MP; Andersson Cabinet; S
30	Pål Jonson	Pål Jonson (born 1972)	18 October 2022	Incumbent	3 years, 324 days	Moderate	Kristersson Cabinet; M–KD–L

== See also ==
- Defence minister
- Lord High Admiral of Sweden (historical antecedent)
- Lord High Constable of Sweden (historical antecedent)
