= Skagersvik =

- Location within Västra Götaland Location within Sweden
- Coordinates: 58°58′N 14°06′E
- Country: Sweden
- Province: Västergötland
- County: Västra Götaland County
- Municipality: Gullspång Municipality

Area
  - Total: 0.57 km^{2} (0.22 sq mi)

Population (31 December 2010)
  - Total: 250
  - Density: 442/km^{2} (1,140/sq mi)
- Time zone: UTC+1 (CET)
  - Summer (DST): UTC+2 (CEST)

Skagersvik is a locality situated in Gullspång Municipality, Västra Götaland County, Sweden. It had 250 inhabitants in 2010.
