= Bernhard Eriksson =

Swedish politician (1878–1952)

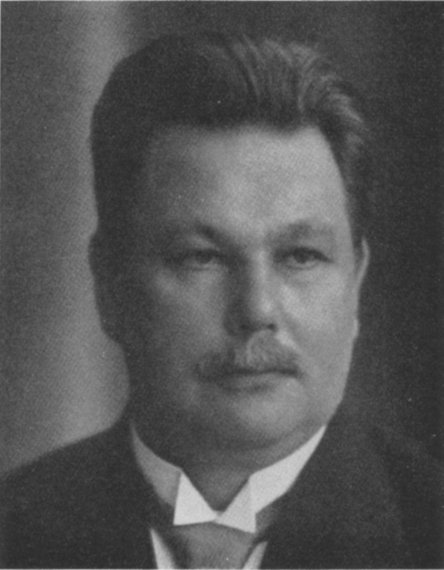

Minister for Naval Affairs
- In office 1920–1920
- Preceded by: Erik Palmstierna
- Succeeded by: Per Albin Hansson as Minister for Defence

Speaker of the Riksdags Second Chamber
- In office 1928–1932
- Preceded by: Viktor Larsson
- Succeeded by: August Sävström

Governor of Kopparbergs County
- In office 1932–1944
- Preceded by: Herman Kvarnzelius
- Succeeded by: Gustaf Andersson

Personal details
- Born: 19 April 1878 Ludvika, Sweden
- Died: 18 April 1952 (aged 73)
- Party: Social Democratic Party
- Occupation: Politician
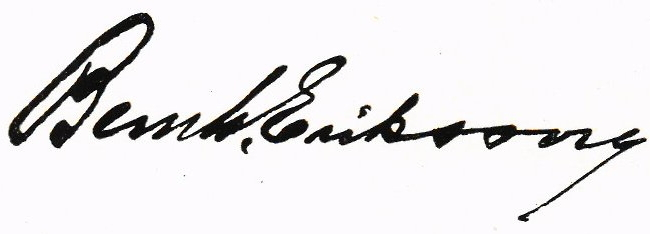
- Signature

Bernhard Eriksson (19 April 1878 – 18 April 1952) was a Swedish social democratic politician. He was Minister for Naval Affairs in 1920 and Speaker of the Riksdags second chamber 1928–1932. He also served as Governor of Kopparberg County (later renamed Dalarna County) from 1932 to 1944.
