= Swedish National Heritage Board =

Swedish government agency for cultural heritage

- Riksantikvarieämbetet

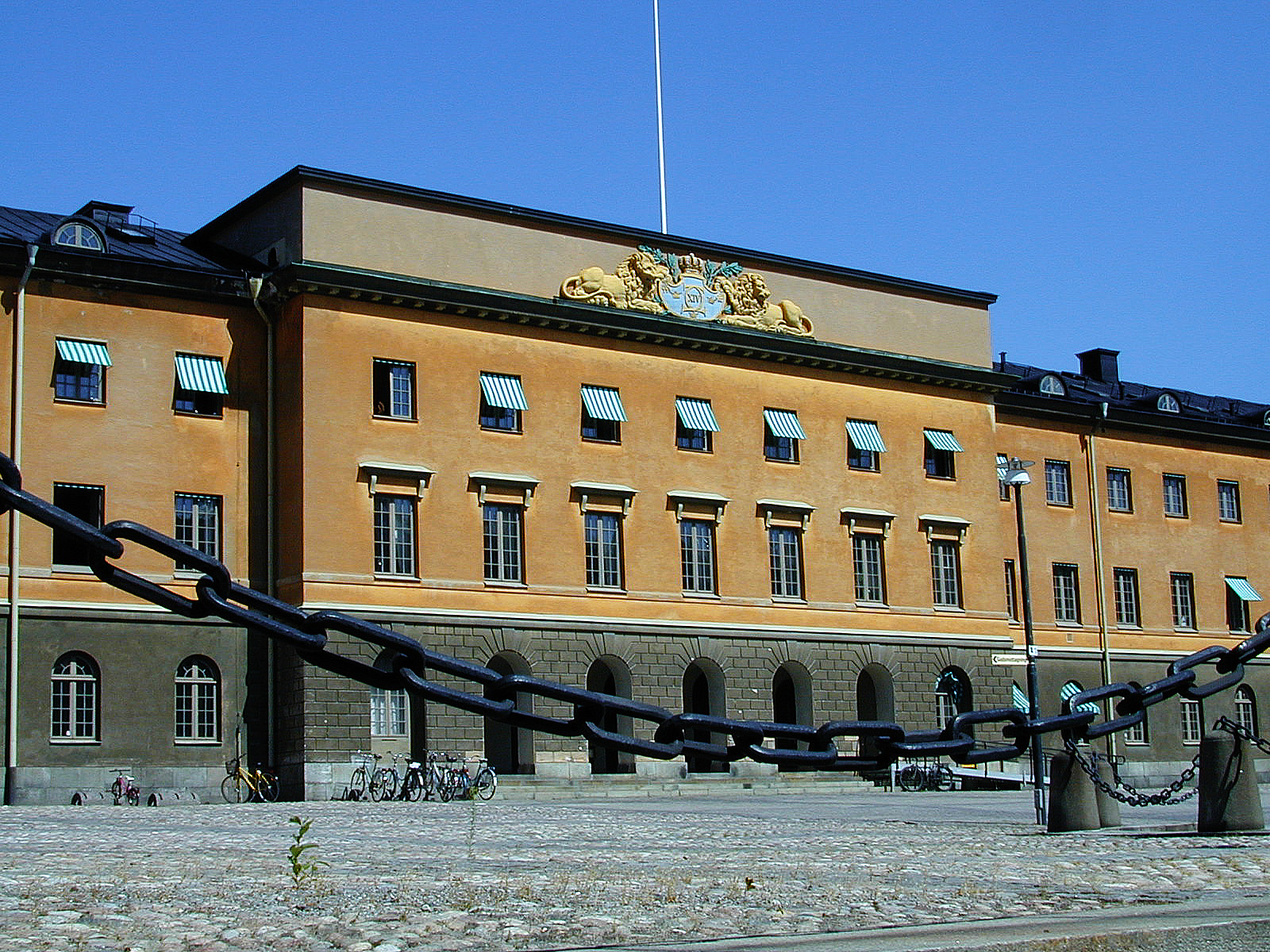
- The main office in Stockholm.

Agency overview
- Formed: 1630; 396 years ago
- Headquarters: Stockholm, Sweden; 59°20′01″N 18°5′28″E
- Agency executive: Susanne Thedéen, Riksantikvarie (Director General)
- Parent department: Ministry of Culture
- Website: raa.se

The Swedish National Heritage Board (Swedish: Riksantikvarieämbetet; RAÄ) is a Swedish government agency responsible for World Heritage Sites and other national heritage monuments and historical environments. It is governed by the Ministry of Culture.

The goals of the agency are to encourage the preservation and protection of historic environments and to promote the respect for and knowledge of historic environments. In order to do this, it tries to ensure that Swedish heritage is accessible to all citizens, to spread information about that heritage, and to "empower heritage as a force in the evolution of a democratic, sustainable society".

== History ==
=== 17th and 18th century ===
The National Heritage Board was founded in 1630. On the 20 May that year, Johannes Bureus who was a prominent rune researcher and King Gustavus Adolphus' private teacher, was appointed the first riksantikvarien ("National Antiquarian"). Bureus' teachings had made the king interested in ancient monuments and national heritage sites and artifacts, which were at that time called "antiquities". Together with a priest and a young student, Bureus went on a journey through Sweden to draw and document runestones, collect old coins, chronicles, law books, letter and manuscripts.

In 1666, Johan Hadorph the seventh National Antiquarian, established the Placat och Påbudh, Om Gamble Monumenter och Antiquiteter ("Signs and Decrees, of Old Monuments and Antiquities"), Sweden's first draft for an Antiquities Act. Aside from laws of the Vatican City, it was the first antiquities regulation in Europe. The decree made it possible to protect ancient monuments and sites from treasure hunters and vandalism, such as people who wanted to use ancient tumuli as brick kilns.

Public interest in ancient monuments and their protection subsided after the time of the Swedish Empire in the 1720s. In 1780, most of the museum collections owned by the government were handed over to the National Library and the National Archives. In 1768, the remainder of the objects were placed in the care of the Royal Swedish Academy of Letters, History and Antiquities, with the National Antiquarian as the academy's secretary.

=== 19th and the early 20th century ===
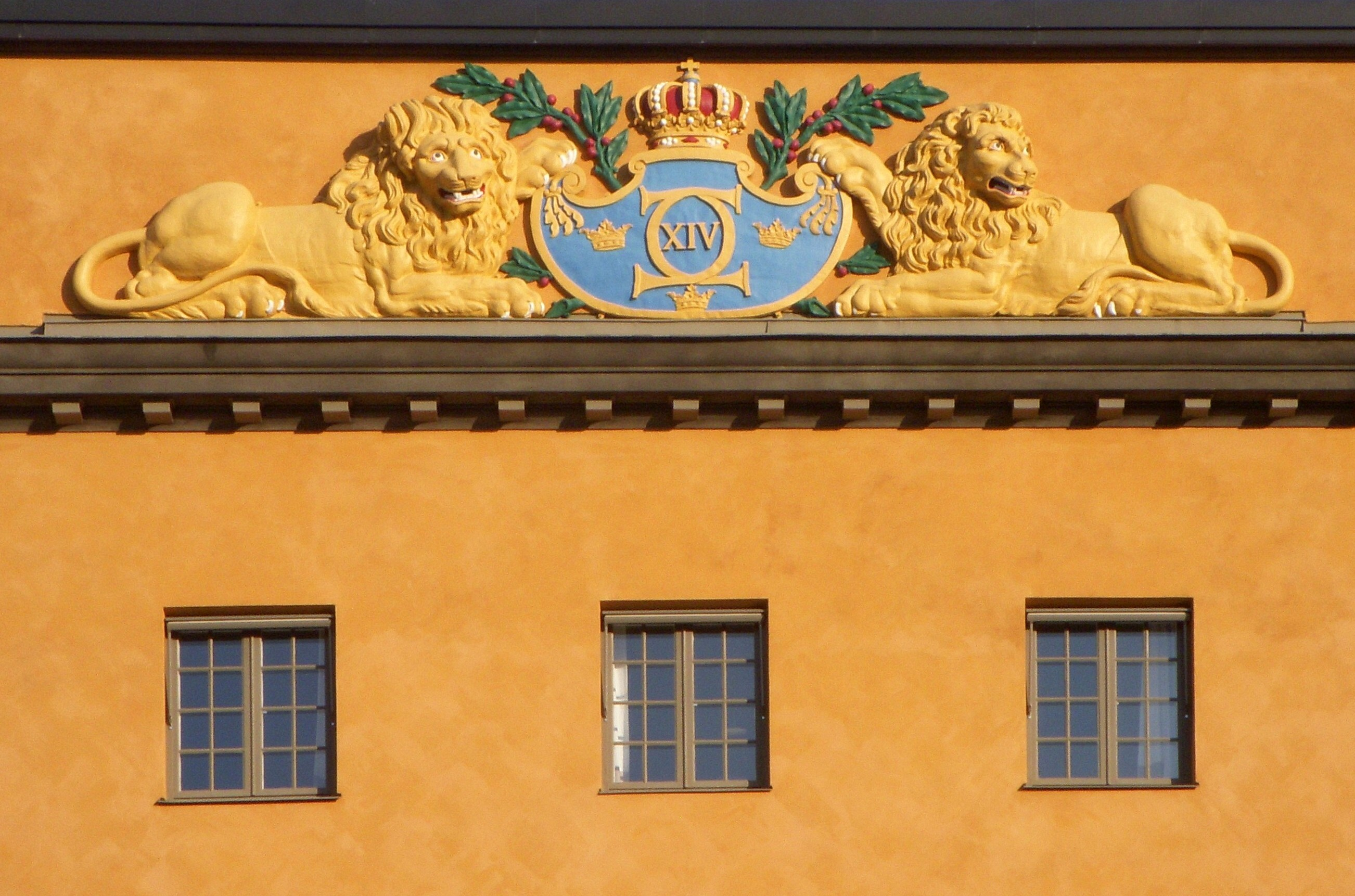
Charles XIV John's monogram on the National Heritage Board's head office building.

During the 18th century, there was a new interest in natural science as well as Neoclassicism and the study of "antiquities" was looked upon as somewhat dated. Some renewal of the studies was brought about when Johan Gustaf Liljegren became National Antiquarian in 1826. Among the projects he started was an organized inventory of objects and sites and archaeological excavations were done at Birka and Visby. A new antiquities regulation was also created in 1867. It stated that any violation of an ancient monument was a criminal offence.

While the Heritage Board's collection of historical objects was still in Stockholm, several additional positions within the area of heritage preservation were instituted during the 20th century. Sigurd Curman (NA from 1923) created a central head agency with a number of County Antiquarians to head all the county museums in Sweden. The County Antiquarians also coordinated their work with the National Heritage Board, which function as an independent government agency since 1938.

=== Second half of the 20th century ===
Part of the museum collections are today under the Statens historiska museer (SHMM) ("National Historical Museums"), the history of which is closely linked with that of the National Heritage Board.

The Antikvarisk-topografiska arkivet (ATA) ("The Antiquarian-Topographical Archives") and the Royal Swedish Academy of Letters, History and Antiquities' Library are also part of the National Heritage Board. These departments are housed in the Eastern Stable opposite the main office building in Stockholm. The functions of the Academy of Letters, History and Antiquities and the National Heritage Board were separated in 1975 while they were still under the aegis under the newly formed government agency the "National Heritage Board and National Historical Museums". These were separated into two agencies, the National Heritage Board and the National Historical Museums, in 1998.

=== 21st century ===
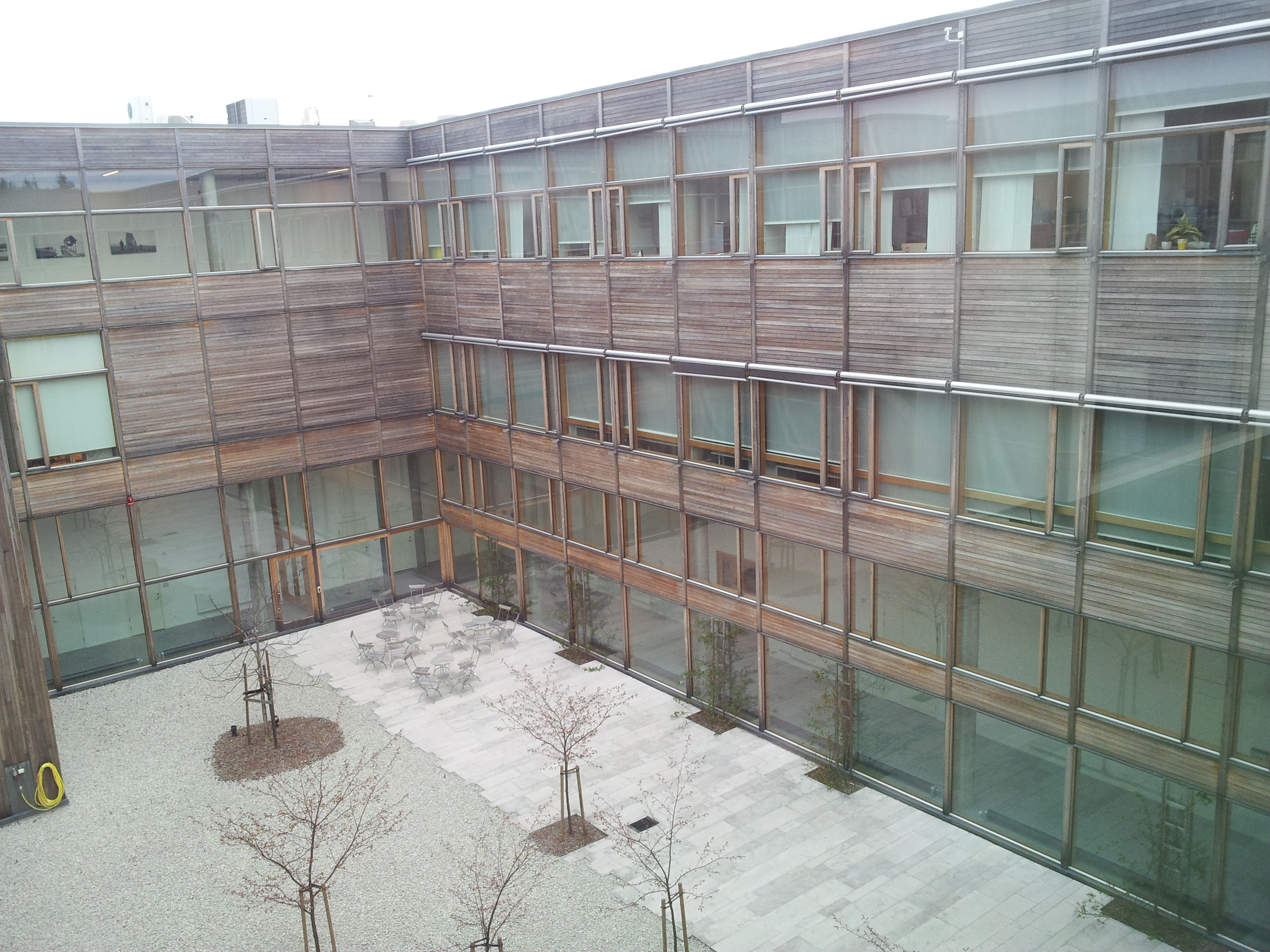
The inner courtyard of the National Heritage Board's building in Visby

On 2 June 2005, the government decided to relocate a major part of the National Heritage Board's activities from Stockholm to Gotland. The move was made to compensate for the loss of jobs on the island when the Swedish military closed down all permanent garrisons there. The National Heritage Board moved to the newly built facilities at the old A7 military compound in Visby, in 2008. Since 2007, the facilities also housed the Swedish Exhibition Agency.

The move to Gotland was questioned by several officials within the agency who believed that the government did not understand how the National Heritage Board worked. Large parts of the operation are as of 2016 still remaining in Stockholm. Since 2012, this includes the main office in the Mounted Royal Guard's old caserns at the History Museum in Östermalm. Under the open area between the museum's main building and the Eastern Stable are storage rooms where the archive and library collections are kept.

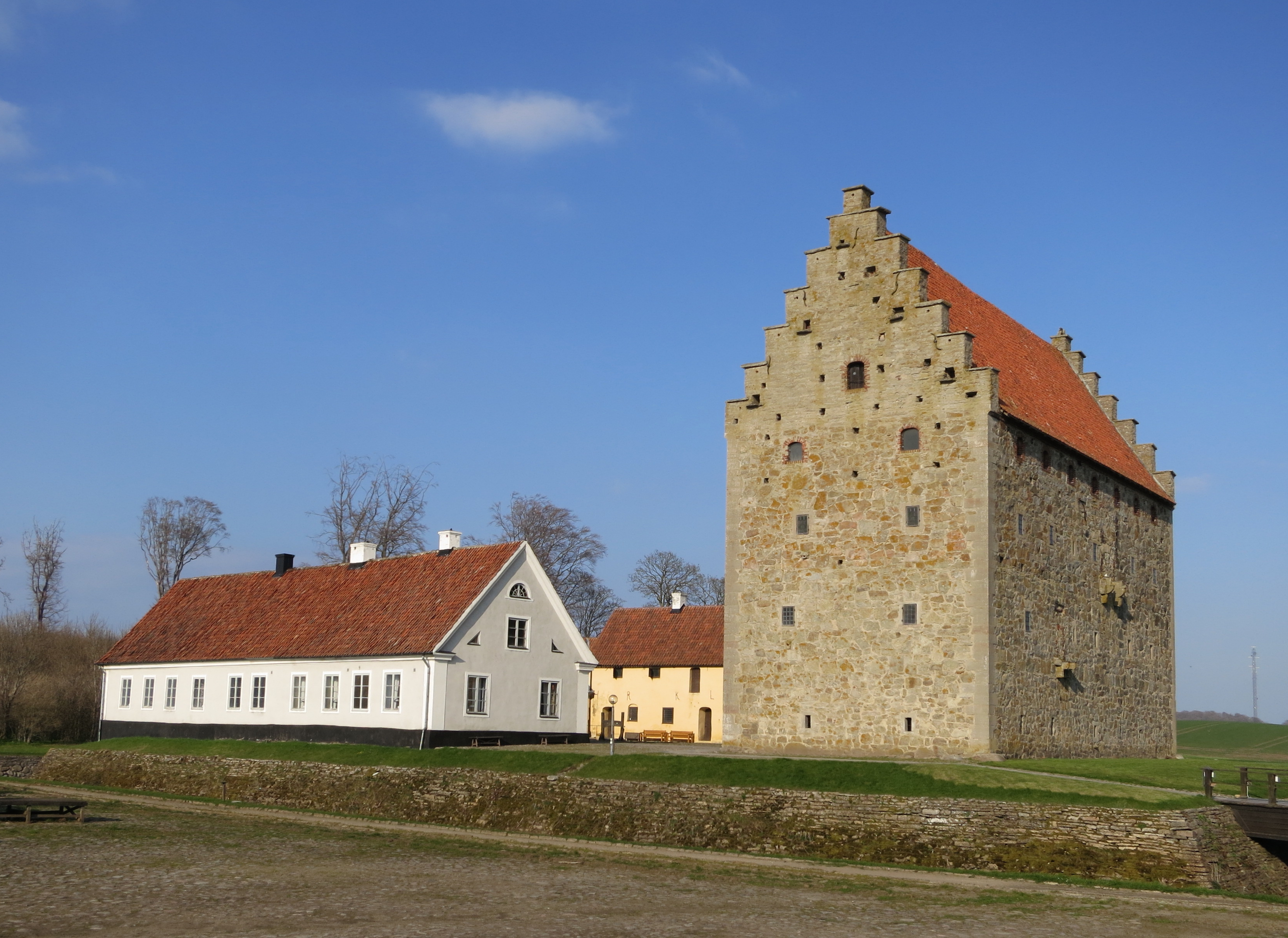
Glimmingehus

Since 2015, the agency has operations in Stockholm, Visby and Tumba (Swedish Museum Services). It also has functions at the Gamla Uppsala museum] and Glimmingehus.

== Earlier functions ==
The agency was previously tasked with archaeological commission operations. This was Sweden's largest archaeological operations organization with several regional offices, among those in Stockholm, Linköping, Gothenburg and Lund. On 1 January 2015, the archaeological operations were transferred to the National Historical Museums. The National Heritage Board's previous double functions - as government agency and outsourcer - had been questioned as early as in the 1980s.

The National Heritage Board's Gotland Studies (Riksantikvarieämbetets Gotlandsundersökningar) (RAGU), were previously a regional office under the archaeological commission operations during the 1970s to 1980s. Since 2015, this is under the aegis of the Gotland Museum.

== Internet activities ==
=== Platsr ===
The agency run the Internet network Platsr, a site where individuals and organizations can write texts about events and memories connected to local history. Pictures, short films and locations on a map can be added to the texts. All material on Platsr is published under different versions of Creative Commons licenses. In March 2016, stories from approximately 3,300 locations had been written by a little more than 1,800 individuals, heritage societies, archives, museums and libraries.

Platsr was created in 2009, at the request of the Swedish government. The idea was to promote a more democratic historiography and to participate in this online.

=== Social media and Wikipedia ===
The National Heritage Board also use social media for its operation. The agency has a Facebook account and since 2009, it has used Flickr to publish archived material. In 2012, the agency started a collaboration with Wikipedia. Experienced Wikipedia editors already worked for the agency in both Stockholm and Visby, and the goal of the collaboration was partly to improve the encyclopedia and partly to link Wikipedia to content in the agency's internal databases.

=== Fornsök ===
The agency also has an internet site called Fornsök, for searching its archives on archaeological and historical sites and buildings.

== National Antiquarians ==
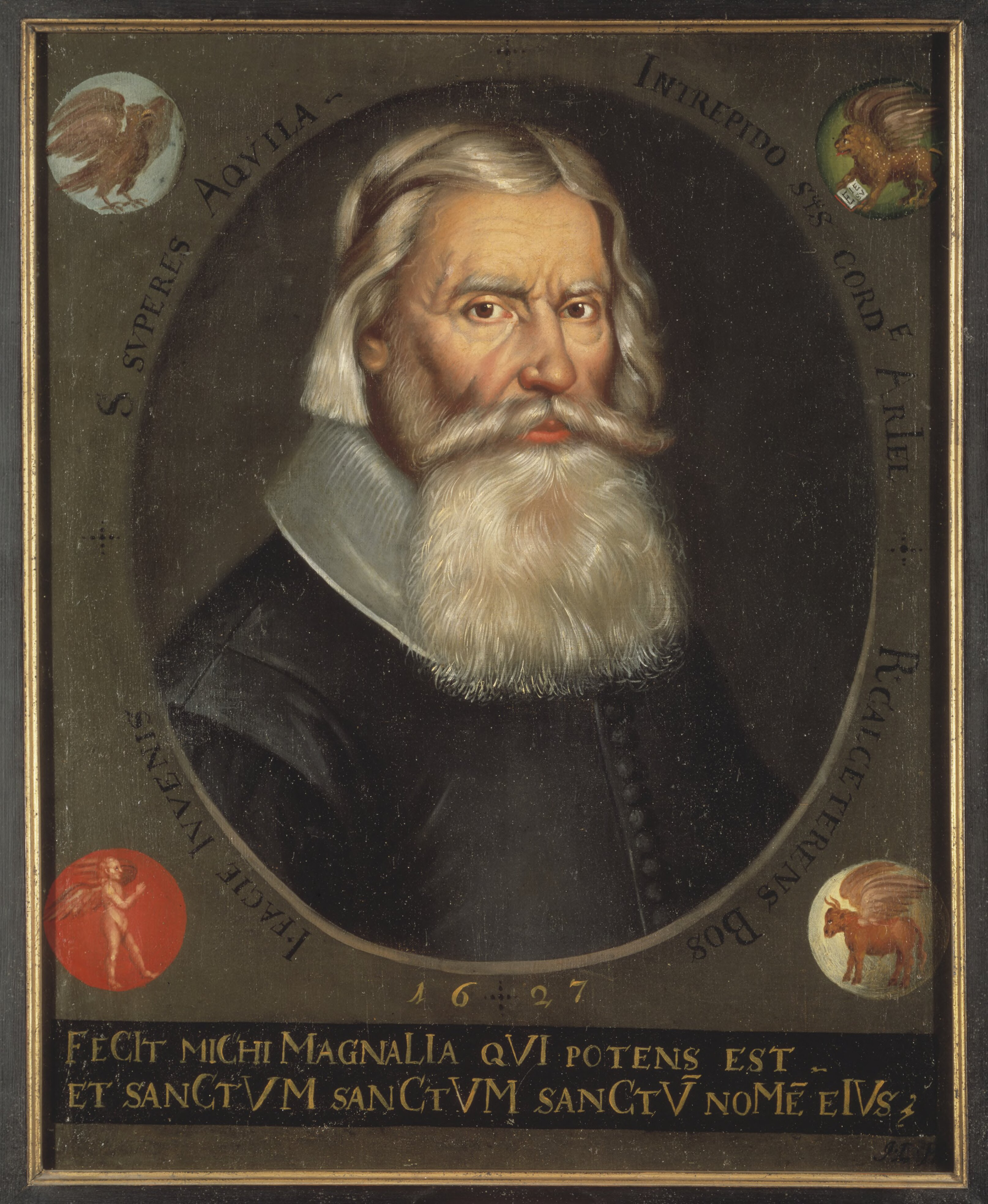
Johannes Bureus, the first National Antiquarian (1630–48)

The highest executive director at the National Heritage Board holds the title riksantikvarie ("National Antiquarian"). The title corresponds with Director-general in other government agencies. The office was instituted on 20 May 1630 by King Gustavus Adolphus. Since then, 31 persons have held the position.

- Johannes Bureus 1630–1648
- Georg Stiernhielm 1648–1651
- Johan Axehielm 1652–1657
- Laurentius Bureus 1657–1665
- Olaus Verelius 1666–1675
- Jacob Reenhielm 1675–1678
- Johan Hadorph 1679–1693
- Johan Peringskiöld 1693–1719
- Johan Fredrik Peringskiöld 1720–1725
- Johan Helin 1725–1750
- Carl Reinhold Berch 1750–1777
- Gudmund Jöran Adlerbeth 1778–1793
- Johan David Flintenberg 1793–1795
- Georg Frans Tihleman 1795–1802
- Jonas Hallenberg 1803–1819
- Carl Birger Rutström 1820–1826
- Johan Gustaf Liljegren 1826–1837
- Bror Emil Hildebrand 1837–1879
- Hans Hildebrand 1879–1907
- Oscar Montelius 1907–1913
- Bernhard Salin 1913–1923
- Sigurd Curman 1923–1946
- Martin Olsson 1946–1952
- Bengt Thordeman 1952–1960
- Gösta Selling 1960–1966
- Sven B.F. Jansson 1966–1972
- Roland Pålsson 1972–1987
- Margareta Biörnstad 1987–1993
- Erik Wegræus 1993–2003
- Inger Liliequist 2003–2012
- Lars Amréus 2012–2021
- Joakim Malmström 2021-
