= Per Edvin Sköld =

Swedish politician (1891–1972)

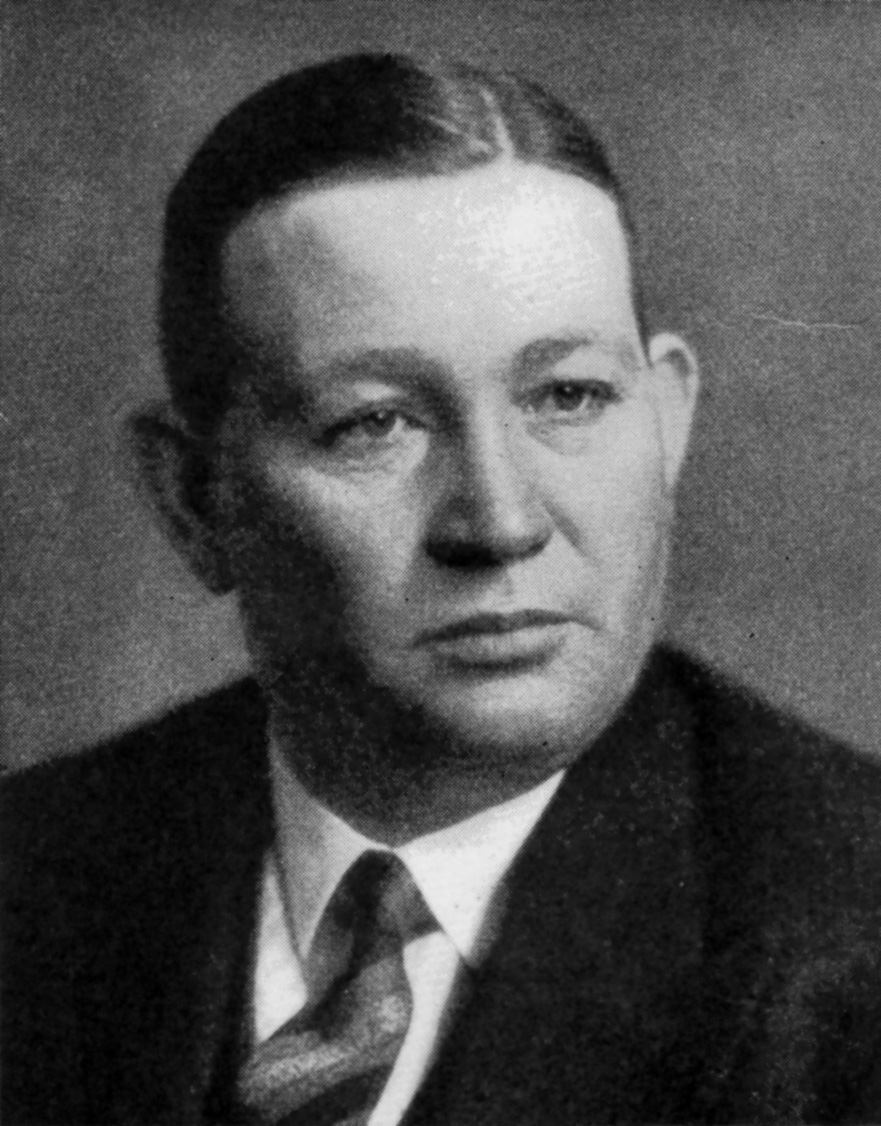

Minister for Finance
- In office 1949–1955

Minister of Defence
- In office 1938–1945

Personal details
- Born: Per Edvin Sköld; 25 May 1891 Malmö, Sweden
- Died: 13 September 1972 (aged 81) Stockholm, Sweden
- Party: Social Democrats
- Spouse: Edit Persson (m. 1918; died 1971)
- Education: Lund University
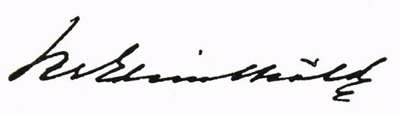
- Signature

Per Edvin Sköld (25 May 1891 – 13 September 1972) was a Swedish statesman who served as Minister for Defence from 1938 to 1945 during World War II. An influential figure of the Social Democratic Party (SAP), Sköld represented Malmö in the Riksdag for 46 years from 1918 to 1964. From 1932 to 1936 and 1945 to 1948, he served as Minister for Agriculture, as well as Minister for Finance from 1949 to 1955.

Sköld is the father of Margareta Biörnstad, Nils Sköld, and Per Sköld.

== In popular culture ==
In the Swedish television movie, Four Days that shook Sweden – The Midsummer Crisis 1941, from 1988, he is played by Swedish actor Carl Billquist.

Political offices
Preceded by Janne Nilsson	Minister of Defence; 1938–1945	Succeeded by Allan Vougt
Preceded by David Hall	Minister for Finance; 1949–1955	Succeeded by Gunnar Sträng
