= Albert Forslund =

Swedish politician (1881–1954)

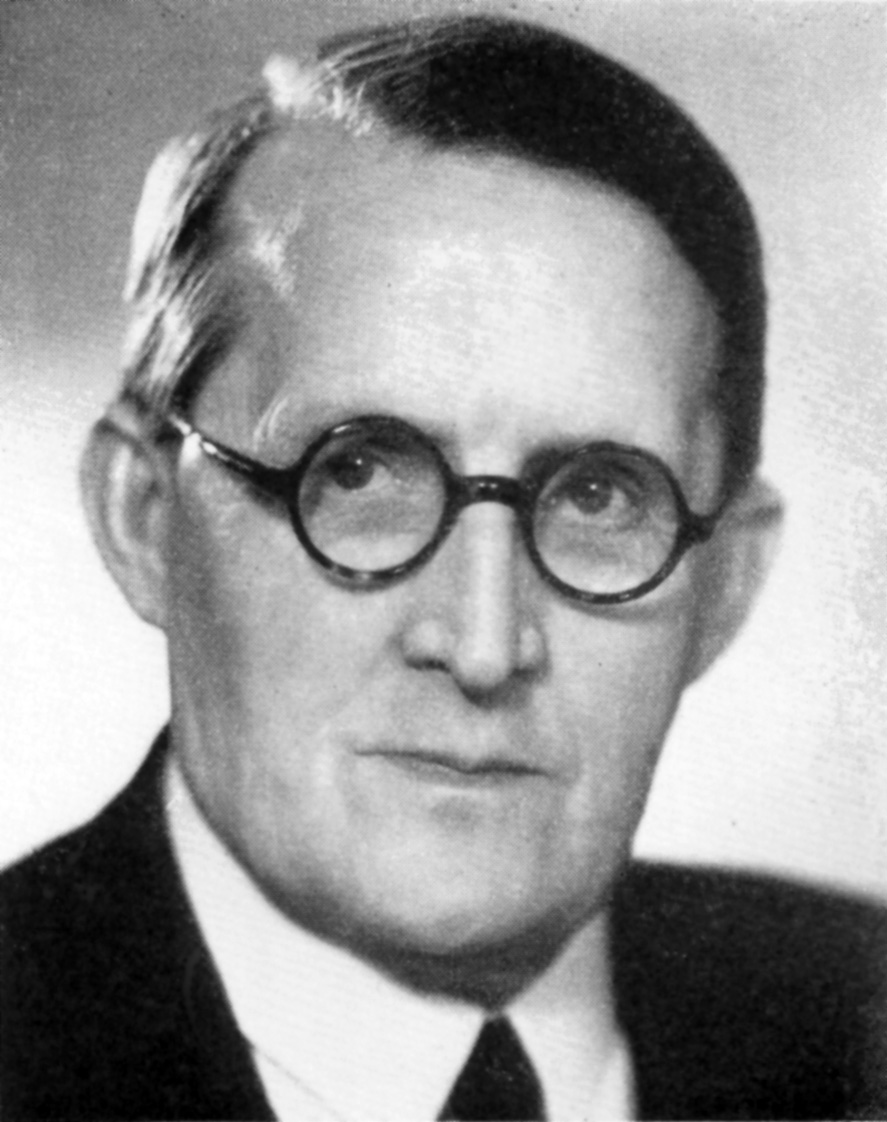
Albert Forslund

Albert Forslund (1881–1954) was a Swedish Social Democratic politician and trade union organizer. He belonged to the Swedish Railway Employees' Union. He was briefly the chairman of the Swedish Trade Union Confederation (LO) from February to September 1936. In the same year, he was appointed Minister of Communications (Transport), and thus left his post as LO chairman.
