= Street lighting in Stockholm =

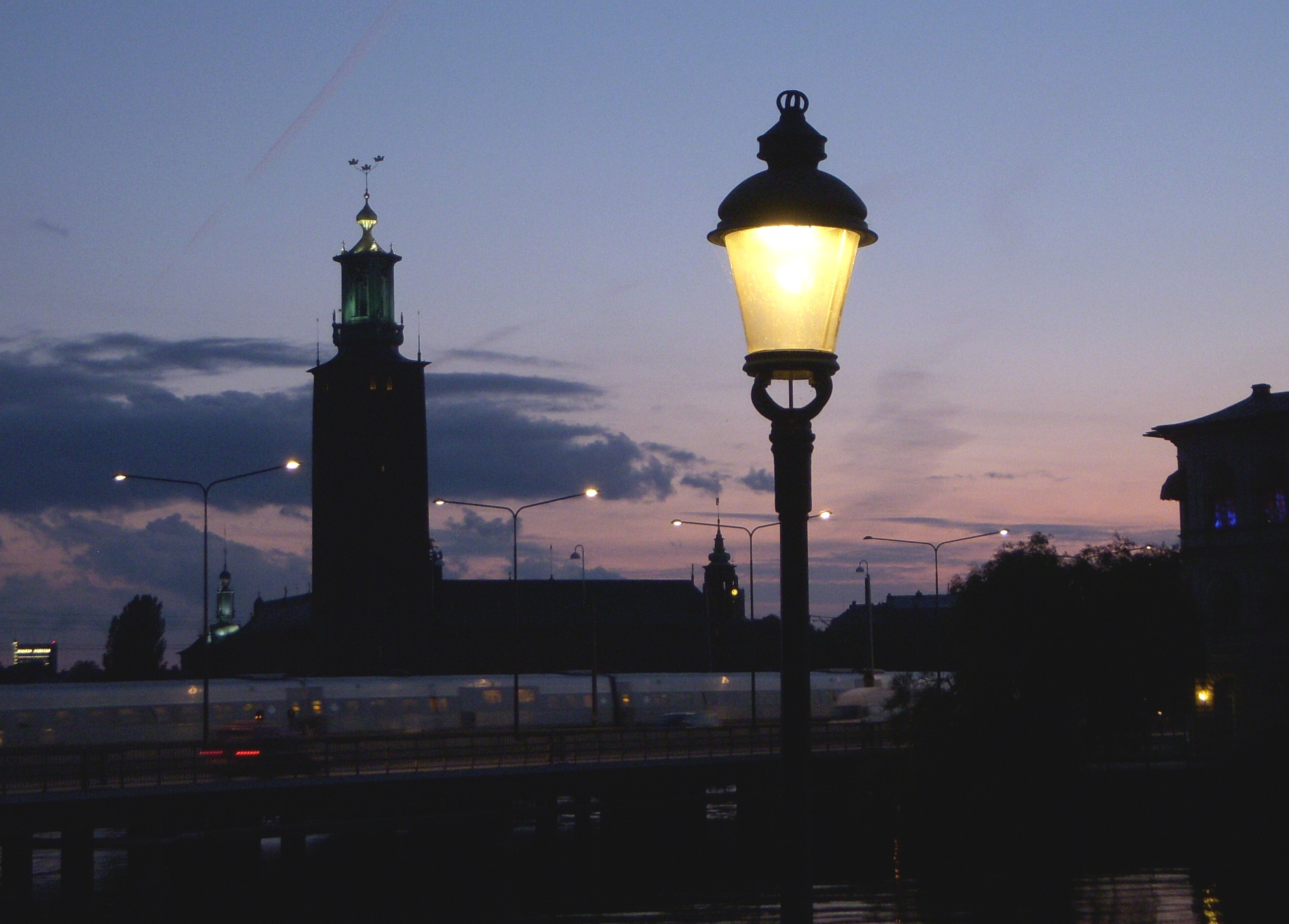
"Stockholmslyktan" and Stockholm City Hall.

Street lighting in Stockholm was a private affair for many centuries. The first known decree regarded lighting in Sweden is from 1697 and concerned Riddarholmen in Stockholm. A royal decree regarding public street lighting was issued in 1749 and asked property owners to keep lanterns lit during the dark months from dusk to midnight, with bright moon nights as an exception. Stockholm was a dark city, especially at night when the street lanterns were extinguished. People avoided walking on the city streets during the nighttime. The public street lighting in Stockholm became a communal task when gas lanterns and later on electrical lamps were introduced during the mid 1800s. The city contributed 97 lanterns which were placed on the city's buildings, on public places, by docks, and bridges.

== History ==
Paris was, in the year 1667, the first city to have public street lighting - at the beginning of the 1700s about 5000 lanterns lit up the streets and squares of Paris. Since the 1680s Berlin followed Paris' example. In London, it took well into the 1700s before private street lighting was supplemented. Stockholm was a dark city during nighttime throughout the medieval period and well into the 19th century. To light up the streets was considered a private matter. Torches and other types of open fire were forbidden due to the risk of fire and a common call to the one who was to leave at night was "Don't forget the lantern!".

It would take until January 12, 1749 before a royal decree on public street lighting was proclaimed. The decree was very detailed and stipulated that, among other things, the property owners should keep lanterns lit during the dark season from darkness to midnight, with the exception of bright moon nights. Later on the time was extended to one in the morning. The lanterns were to be placed in a zig-zag pattern from one side of the street to the other with at most 30 steps (circa 20 meters) distance between each other. The property owners were allowed to choose what type of lantern was to be used. The light sources of the city were marked on a map. The city contributed with 97 lanterns which were mounted on buildings, placed on public places, by ports, and bridges.

However, Stockholm remained a dark city, especially after one in the morning when all public lighting had been extinguished. The street lanterns were called wolf eyes, a term more frightening than calming. Wolf eyes were dim oil lamps with a luminous intensity less than of a candle and It consisted of a square candle holder made of tinplate with glass panes. Wolf eyes used over 0,66 centiliters per hour. The lamps bad lighting brought many complaints, but the benefits of the new street lighting system was also recognized since the light helped prevent crime.

Property owners joined together and hired so-called lamp lighters to be responsible for the street lighting. There were about 3 500 street lamps in the city in 1824. The Stockholm politician Gustaf Nerman (born in 1827) was critical to the wolf eyes; he meant that even though one was able to see where they were placed one wasn't able to see anything else because of the dim light. People usually avoided wandering the streets after dark in the 1830s.

The last gas lighting in Stockholm was turned off in the year 1941. The 1930s became the breakthrough for the electrical street lighting and light signs, and the street lighting was kept lit during the night from the year 1929. Stockholm became a city that bathed in light even during World War II, apart from some blackout exercises.

Many of Stockholm's street lighting luminaries are designed by famous architects. Norrbros slender luminaries, drawn by Kurt von Schmalensee in 1926 are considered to be one of the first and best preserved examples of functionalist street lighting in Sweden. There are two classics from the gas lanterns time which are nowadays fed with electricity, both of which are manufactured today and used in culture-historically valuable areas.

About 145000 light sources (lamps and similar objects) were in Stockholm City in the year 2010. Half of the light fixtures contained gas-discharge lamps and were to be phased out by the year 2015.

== A bright city ==
Stockholm exhibition 1930 doesn't only count as the breakthrough of functionalism in Sweden, but also as the huge breakthrough for electronic signage. Nighttime lighting was an important part of the concept of the exhibition. The functionalist Gunnar Asplund was the exhibition architect. Stockholm has been "bathing" in light since the 1930s. For example, extensive electronic commercials were placed on the Esselte house and Centralpalatset's smooth window parapets, both houses were designed by Ivar Tengbom.

The followers of modernism examined this new, brilliant, and bright Stockholm with positive interest; it was something new when it came to shapes and color.

== Gallery ==
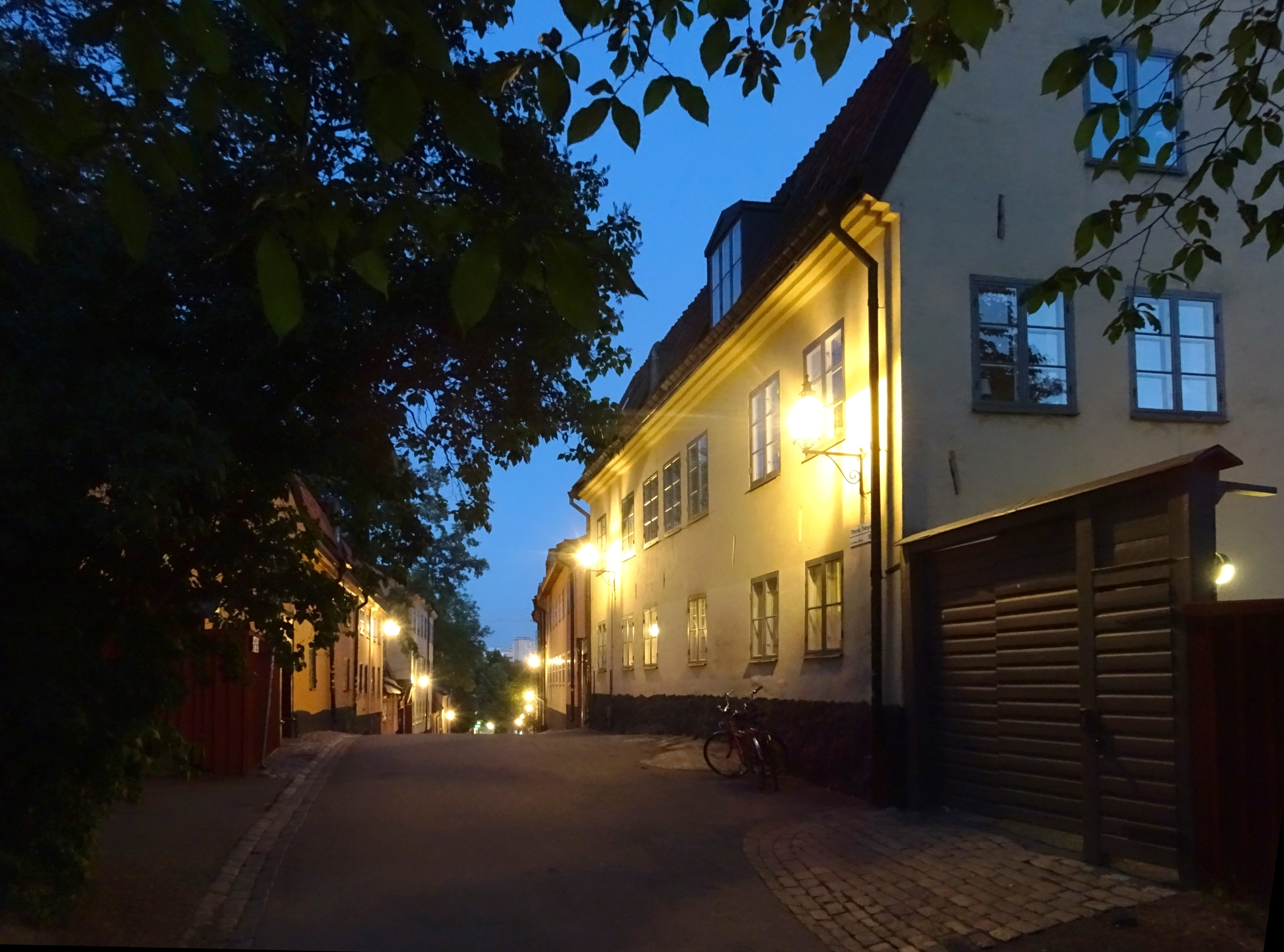
Environmentally adjusted street lighting on Yttersta Tvärgränd

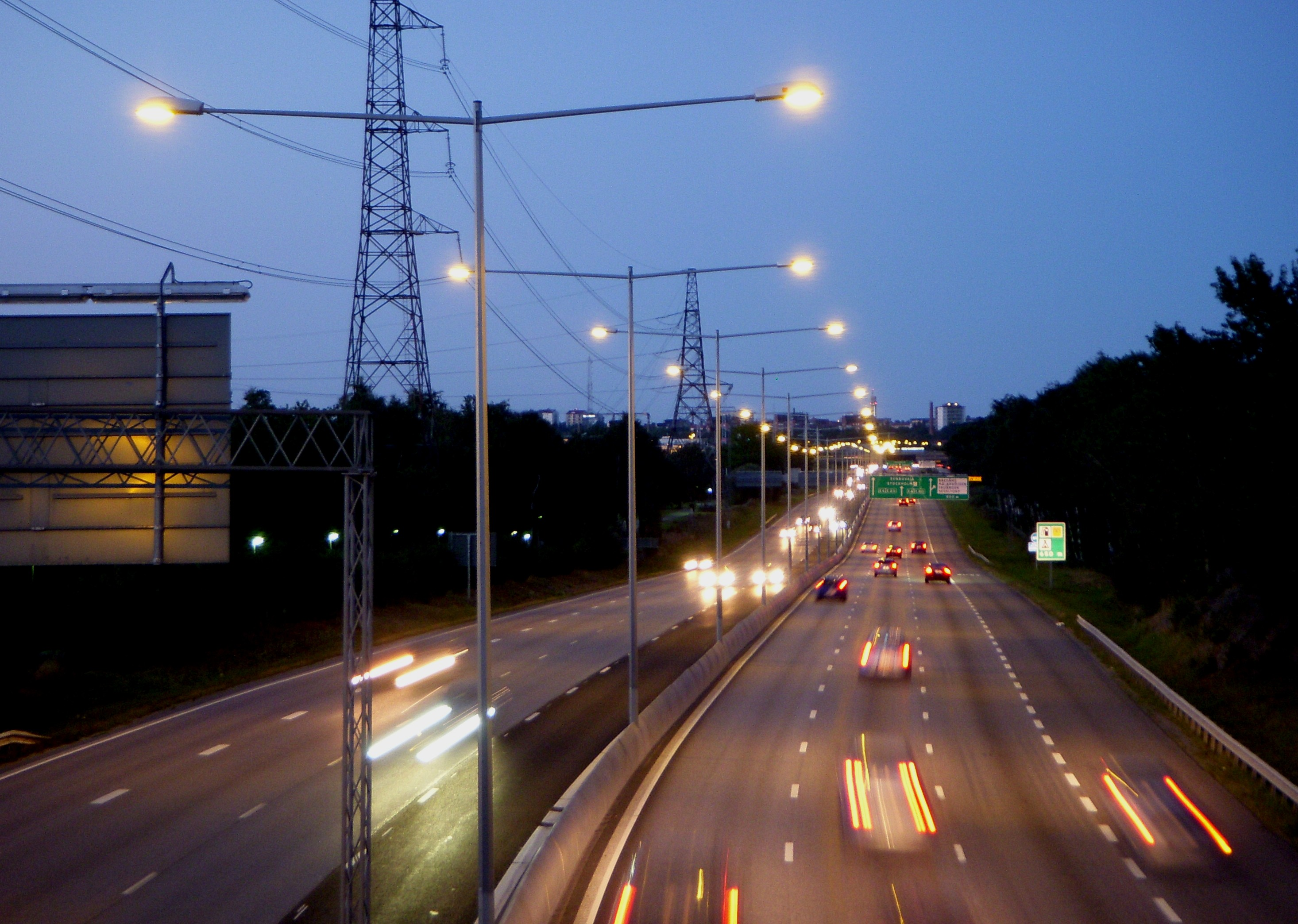
Freeway lighting on Södertäljevägen by Bredäng

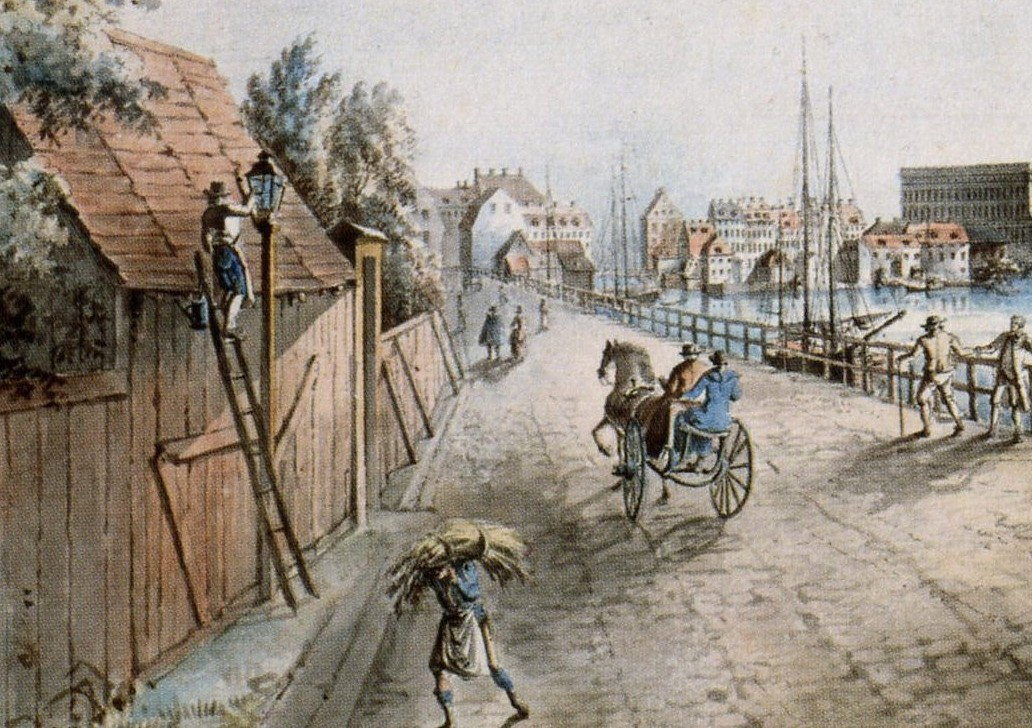
A lamp lighter with their oil can by Stadshusbron's west side (1790)

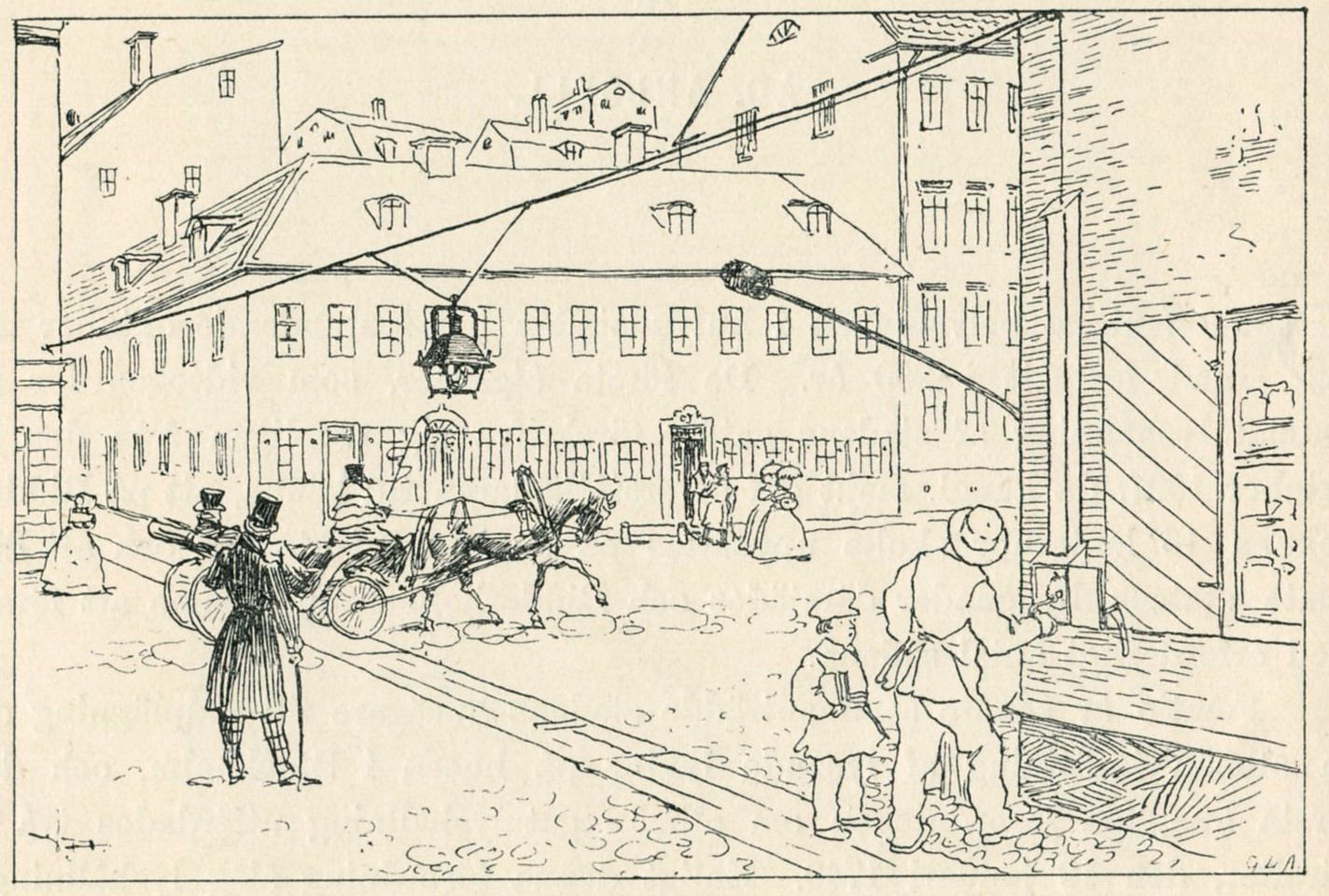
Argand lamp, Drottninggatan (1828)

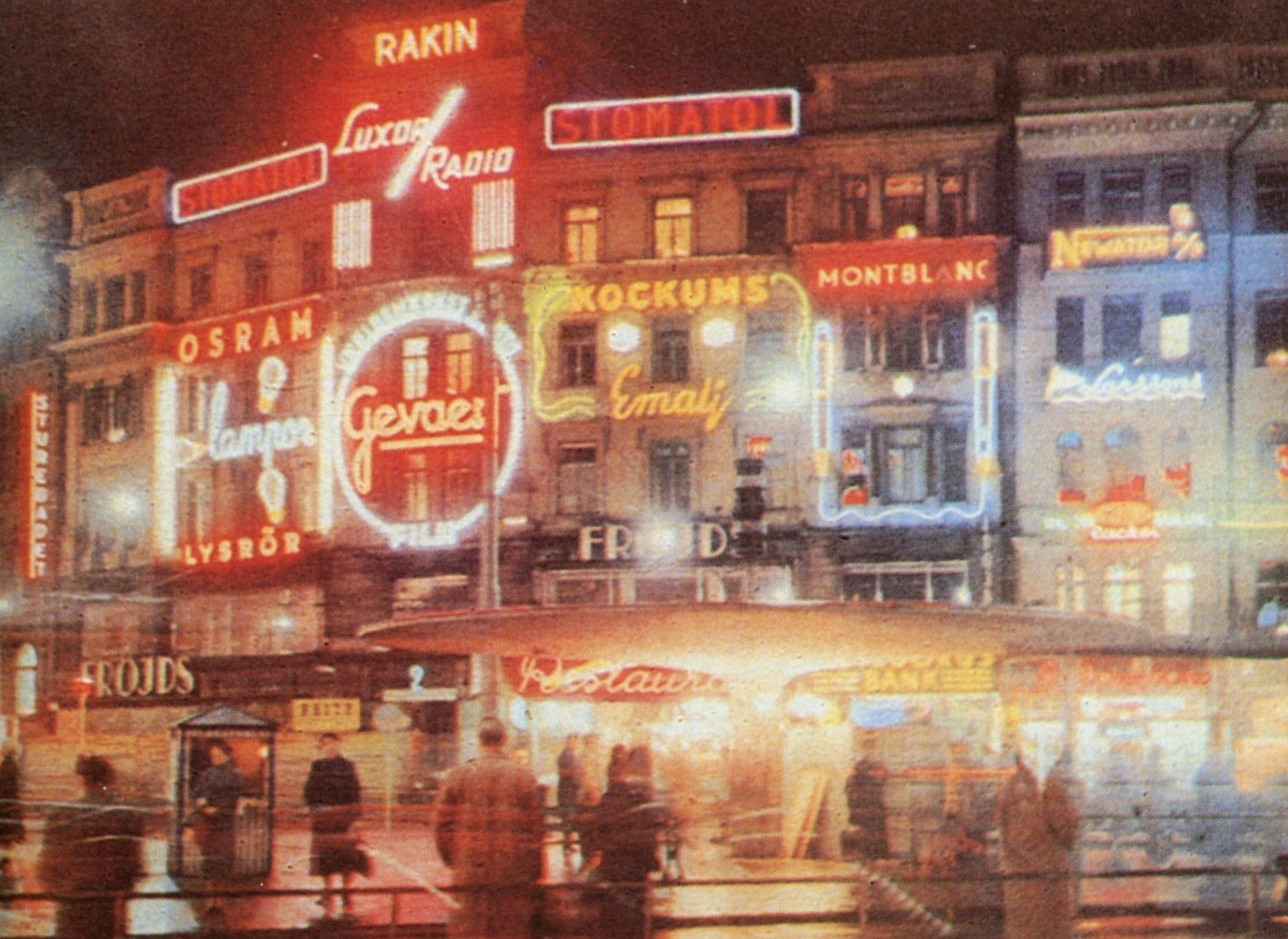
Stureplan bathing in light. Photo by K.W. Gullers (1957)

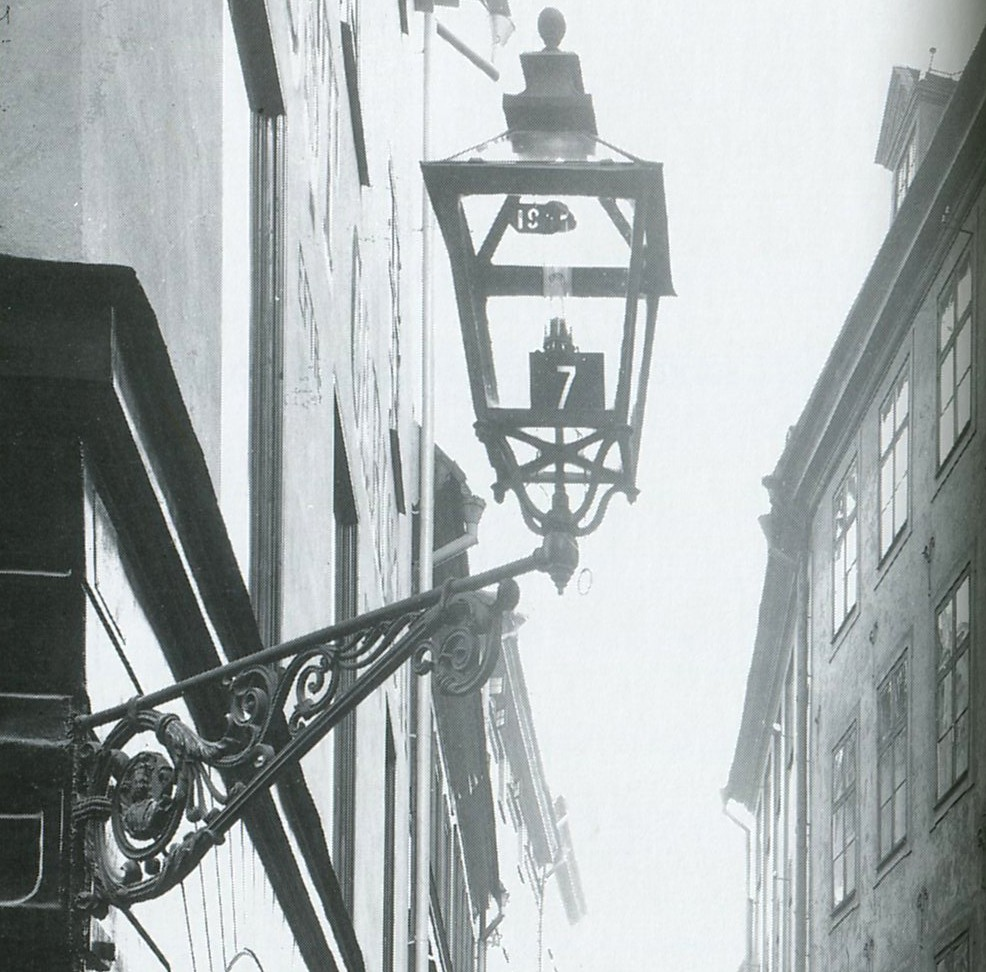
The gasworks' standard lantern from 1853, here on Västerlånggatan (1904).

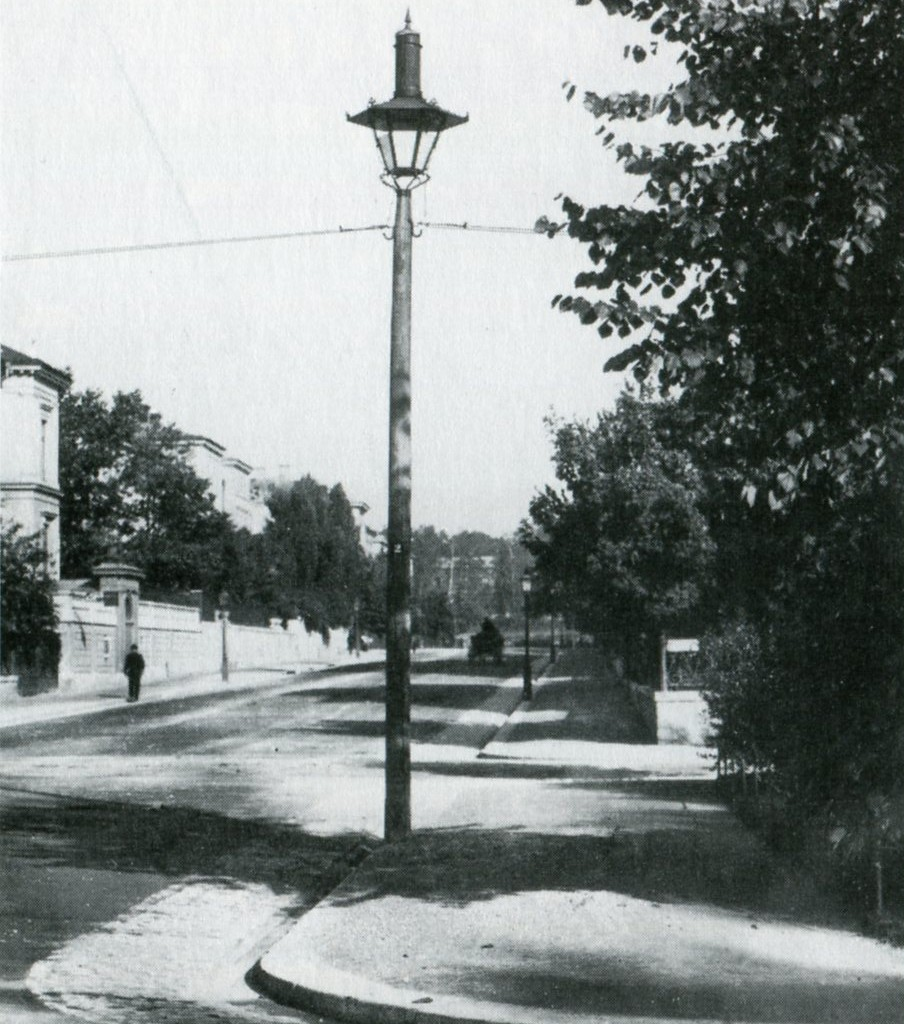
Arc lamp lighting on Villagatan (1883).

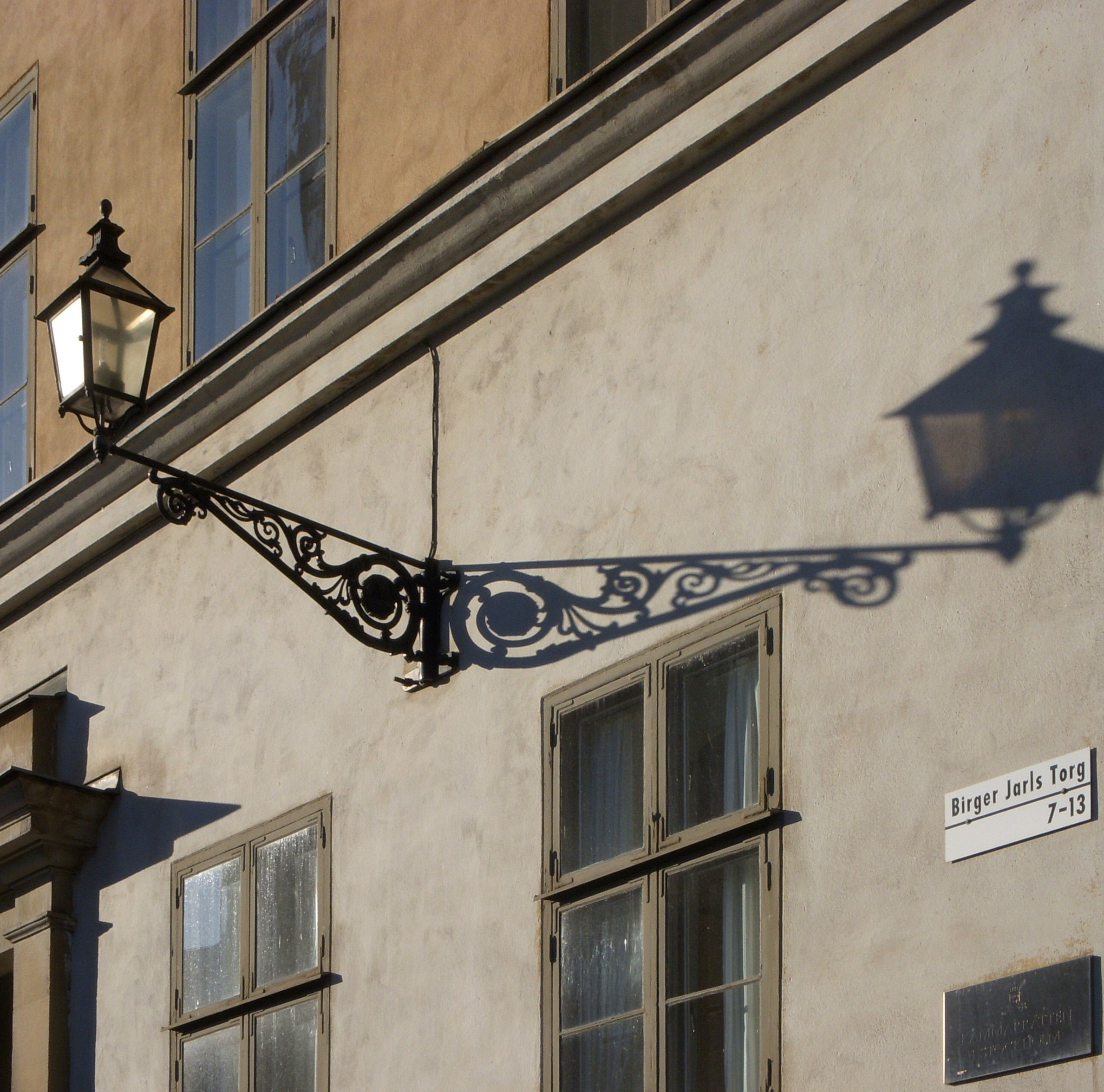
The gasworks' standard lantern on Birger Jarls torg Square

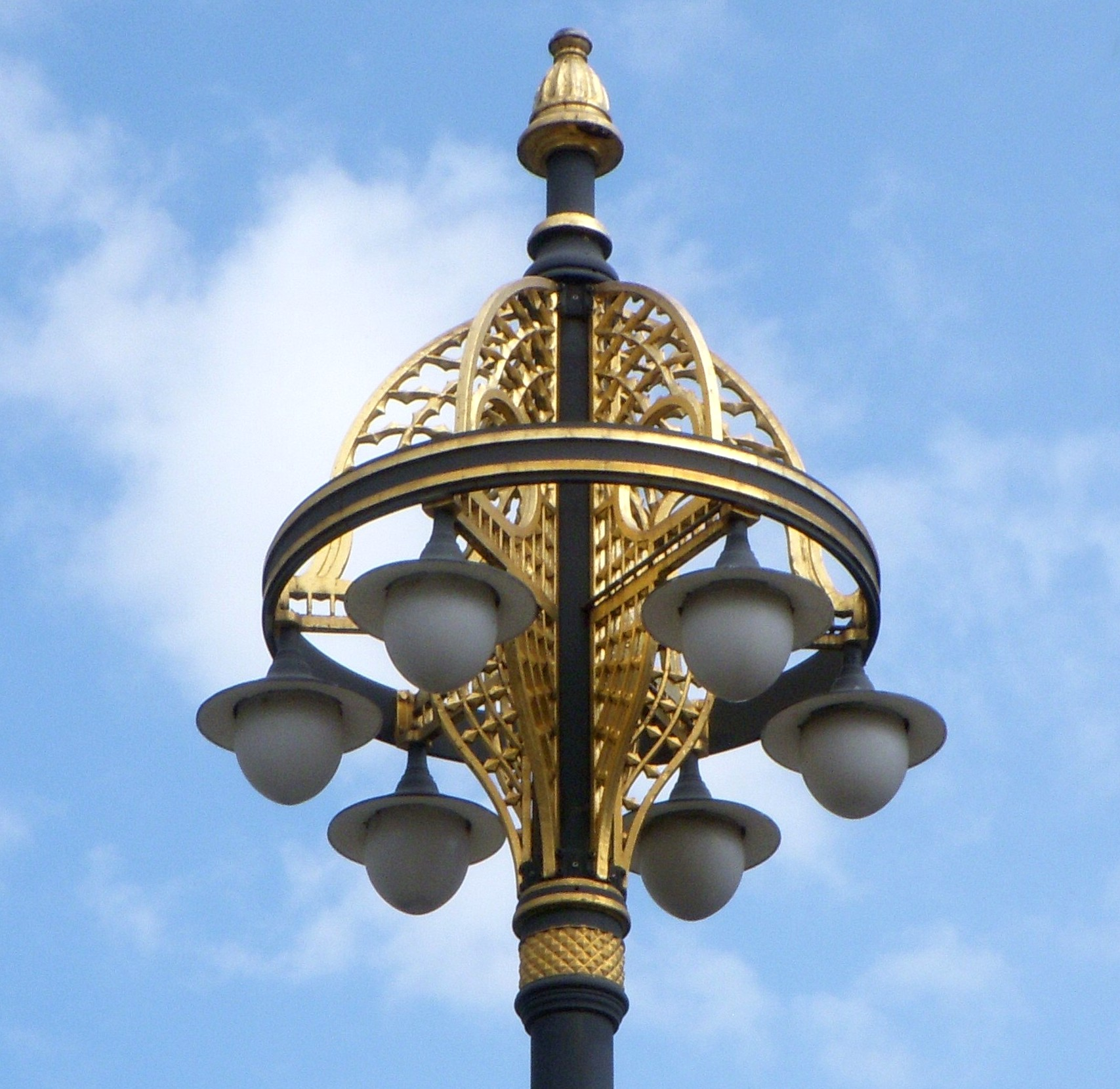
Norrmalmstorg Design: Gustaf de Frumerie
