= Handelsdepartementet =

Handelsdepartementet may refer to:

- Ministry of Trade and Industry (Norway), a former ministry in Norway
- Ministry of Commerce and Industry (Sweden), a former ministry in Sweden
