= Ministry of Commerce and Industry (Sweden) =

- Handelsdepartementet

Commerce and industry ministry overview
- Formed: 1 July 1920
- Dissolved: 31 December 1982
- Superseding Commerce and industry ministry: Ministry for Foreign Affairs
- Headquarters: Stockholm, Sweden
- Minister responsible: Minister of Commerce and Industry
- Parent agency: Government Offices (Note: Before 1 January 1975, the Government Offices was called the Royal Chancery.)

The Ministry of Commerce and Industry (Note: [Royal Swedish] Ministry of Commerce and Industry; (British equivalent) the Board of Trade; (American equivalent) the Department of Commerce.) (Swedish: Handelsdepartementet) was a ministry in Sweden, established in 1920 when certain matters were taken over from the Ministry of Finance. The ministry was headed by the minister of commerce and industry. The ministry ceased to exist in 1982 and matters were transferred to the Ministry for Foreign Affairs.

== History ==
The Ministry of Commerce and Industry was formed in 1920, when it was added by the separation of certain matters from the Ministry of Finance. It dealt with matters relating to domestic and foreign trade, the business school system, domestic and foreign shipping, navigation training, pilotage and lighthouse services, industry, handicrafts, sloyd, mining and quarry management, the state's mining property, geological surveys, patents, flammable oils, explosive goods, aktiebolag with certain exceptions, the commercial insurance system, lotteries and economic statistics. The Ministry of Commerce and Industry also dealt with legislation relating to the supervision of ships, the commercial insurance system and incorrect designation of origin, payment obligations to foreign countries and restriction of competition in the business world. Under the head of the ministry, colloquially known as the minister of commerce and industry, there was both the state secretary and the director general for administrative affairs (expeditionschef), each as the head of their own department, the director (byråchef) and two deputy directors (kanslisekreterare), each with their own group of cases. In addition, there were several 1st and 2nd administrative officers (kanslisekreterare), registry clerks, amanuenses and the War Materials Inspector.

The following government agencies belonged to the ministry in the early 1950s: the National Board of Trade, the Pilot Board (Lotsstyrelsen), the Geological Survey of Sweden, the National Swedish Patent and Registration Office, the National Swedish Private Insurance Inspectorate (Försäkringsinspektionen), the National Swedish Authority for Testing, Inspection and Metrology, the National Aeronautical Research Institute, the National Swedish Experimental Shipbuilding Tank (Statens skeppsprovningsanstalt), the National Swedish Maritime Museum, and the National Swedish Trade Commission (Statens handelskommission). In 1982, the year the ministry ceased, the following government agencies belonged to the ministry: the National Board of Trade, the Swedish Trade Policy Council (Handelspolitiska rådet), the Swedish ECSC Board (CECA-nämnden), the Swedish Advisory Board of Auditor Issues (Rådgivande nämnden för revisorsfrågor), the Swedish Advisory Board (Rådgivande nämnden för tolk- och översättarfrågor), the Swedish Board of Customs (Generaltullstyrelsen), the National Swedish Patent and Registration Office, the Court of Patent Appeals (Patentbesvärsrätten), Granskningsnämnden för försvarsuppfinningar, the Market Court, the Swedish Antitrust Ombudsman (Näringsfrihetsombudsmannen), the National Swedish Price and Cartel Office (Statens pris- och kartellnämnd), the Swedish Consumer Agency, Glesbygdsnämnden, the National Swedish Board for Consumer Complaints, the Swedish Travel Guarantee Board (Resegarantinämnden), the Swedish Lottery Board (Lotterinämnden), the National Swedish Board of Economic Defence, the Swedish Oil Crisis Board (Oljekrisnämnden), National Swedish Export Credits Guarantee Board, the Swedish Import Office for Developing-Country Products (Importkontoret för u-landsprodukter) and Tekodelegationen.

The Ministry of Commerce and Industry ceased to exist in 1982 and its matters were transferred to the Ministry for Foreign Affairs.

== Location ==
The Ministry of Commerce and Industry was initially located in Sparreska palatset at Birger Jarls torg 11 at Riddarholmen in Stockholm where they shared premises with the Swedish Fiscal Court of Appeal (Kammarrätten) until 1922. The ministry moved in 1922 into the Rosenbad complex, which the Swedish state took over in 1919 and 1924. It remained at the address Rosenbad 2 in Stockholm until 1976. In 1979 it moved to Centralpalatset at Tegelbacken 2.

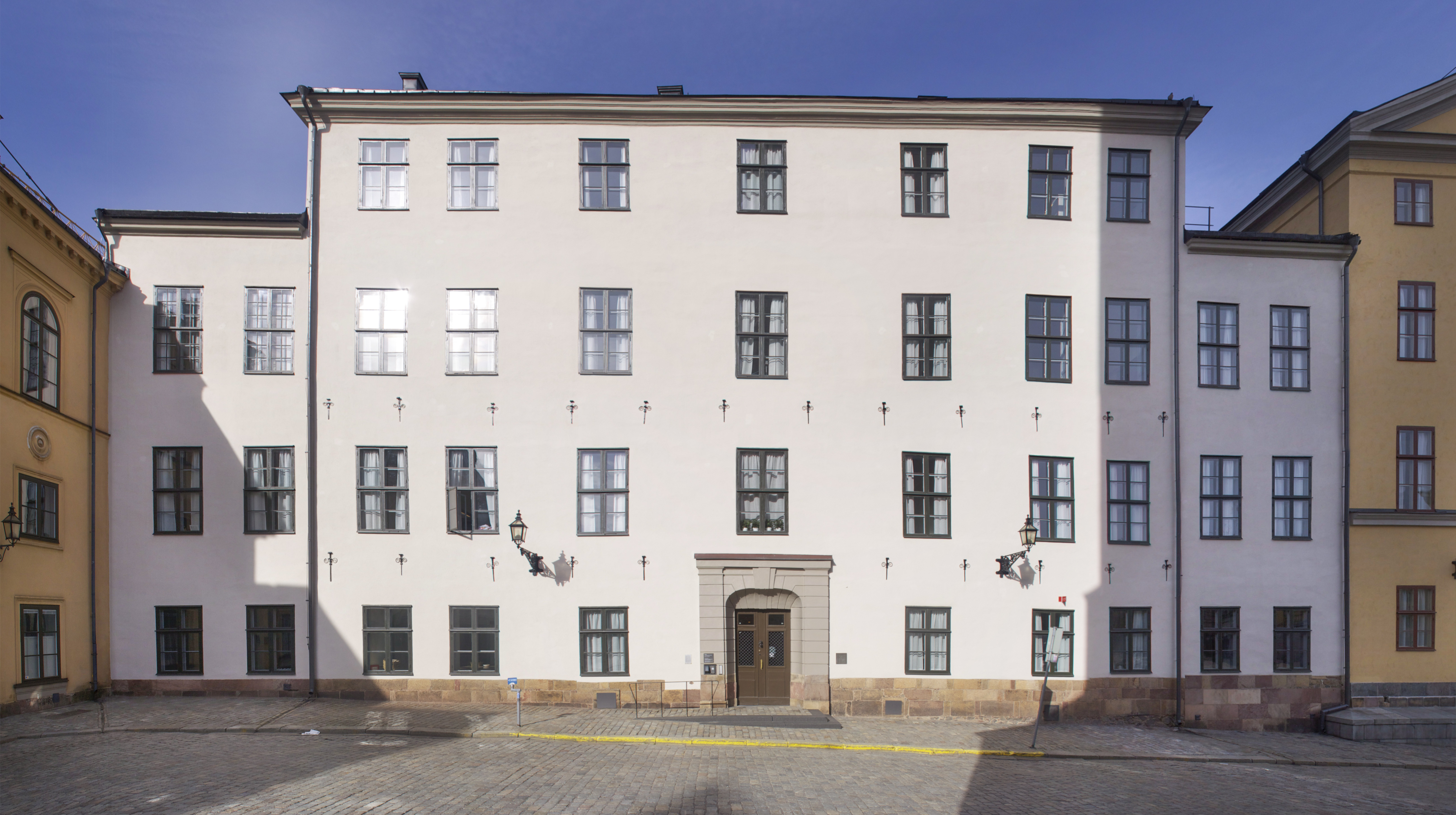
Sparreska palatset at Birger Jarls torg 11

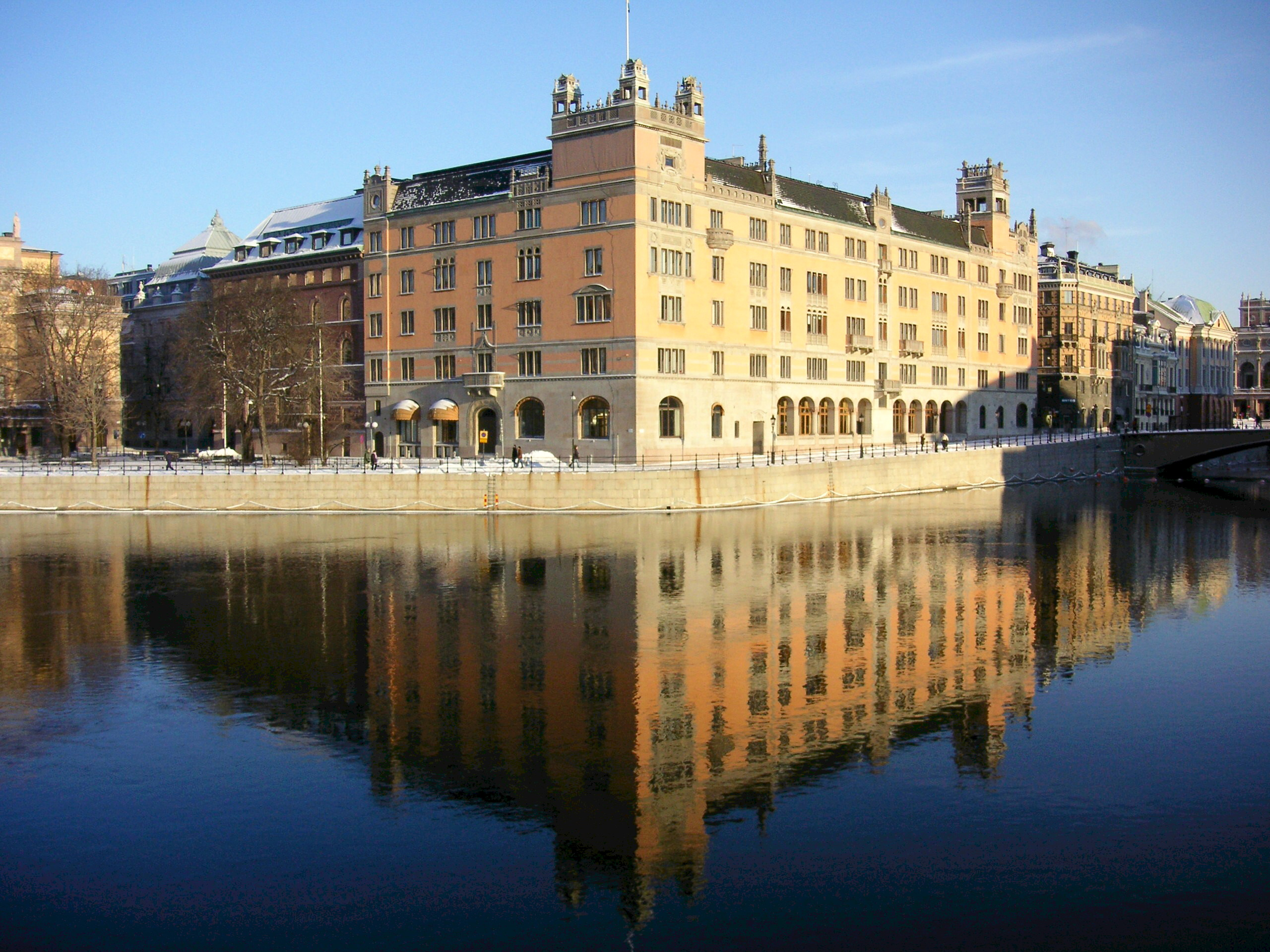
Rosenbad 2

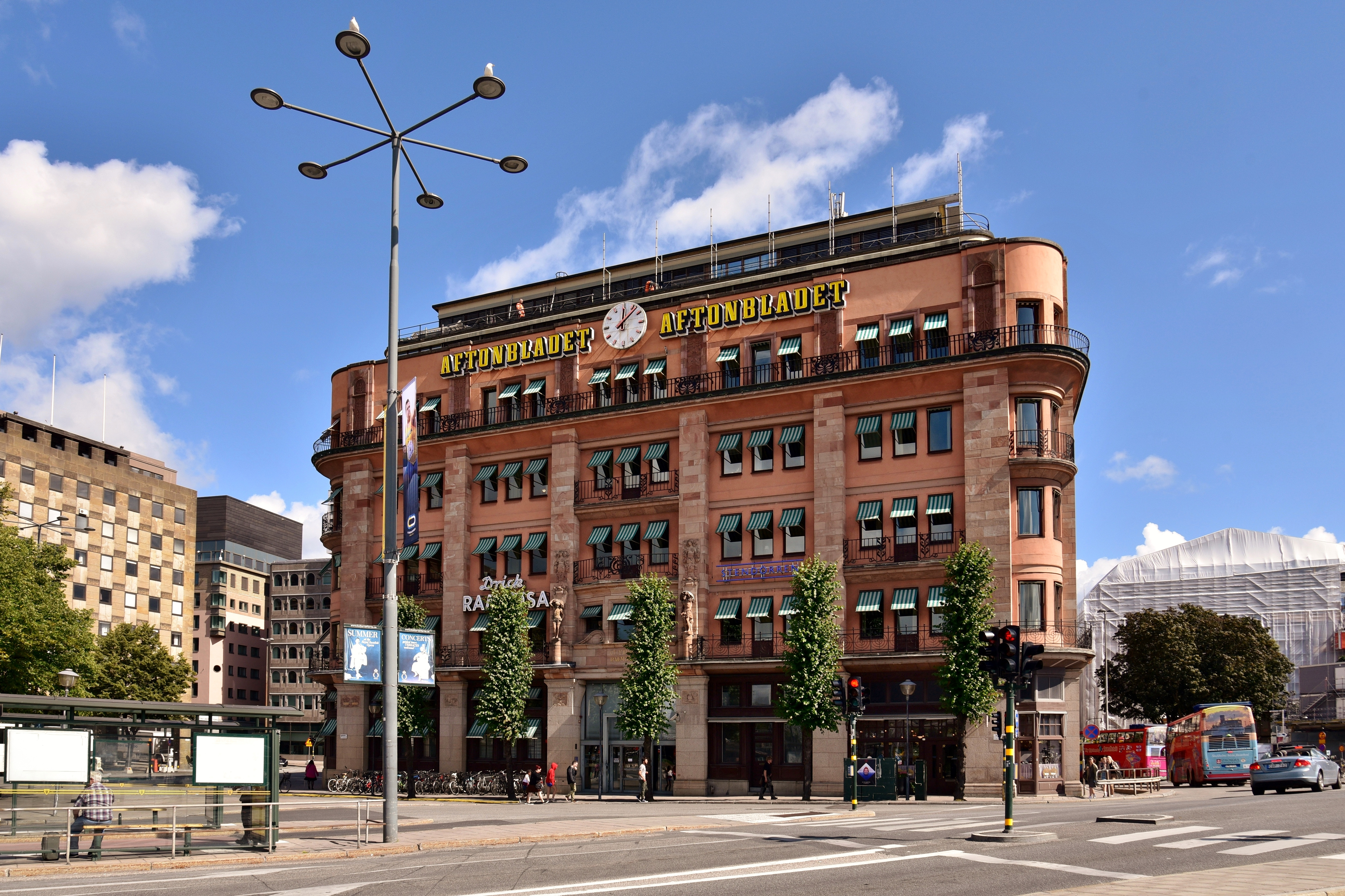
Centralpalatset at Tegelbacken 2

== See also ==
- Minister of Commerce and Industry
