= Ministry of Defence (Sweden) =

Government ministry of Sweden

Coordinates: 59°19′48.8″N 18°04′05.42″E

- Försvarsdepartementet
- Coat of Arms of the Ministry of Defence

Agency overview
- Formed: 1 July 1920
- Preceding agencies: Ministry of Land Defence; Ministry for Naval Affairs
- Jurisdiction: SFS 1996:1515
- Headquarters: Jakobsgatan 9, Stockholm, Sweden
- Employees: 245 (2024)
- Annual budget: SEK 357 million (2025)
- Ministers responsible: Pål Jonson, Head of the Ministry Minister for Defence; Carl-Oskar Bohlin, Minister for Civil Defence
- Parent agency: Government Offices (Note: Before 1 January 1975, the Government Offices was called the Royal Chancery.)
- Website: government.se

The Ministry of Defence (Swedish: Försvarsdepartementet) is a ministry in the Government of Sweden responsible for policies related to national defence and civil defence.

The ministry is currently headed by the Minister for Defence, Pål Jonson of the Moderate Party.

== History ==
The ministry was established on 1 July 1920 when the Ministry of Land Defence and the Ministry for Naval Affairs was merged into one ministry.

It's located at Jakobsgatan 9 at Gustaf Adolfs torg in Stockholm, where it has been located since 1966.

== Government agencies ==
The Ministry of Defence is principal for 12 government agencies, one partly state-owned company (SOS Alarm) and one fund.

- Armed Forces (Försvarsmakten)
- Defence Materiel Administration (Försvarets materielverk)
- Defence Conscription and Assessment Agency (Totalförsvarets plikt- och prövningsverk)
- National Defence Radio Establishment (Försvarets radioanstalt)
- Defence Research Agency (Totalförsvarets forskningsinstitut)
- Foreign Intelligence Inspectorate (Statens inspektion för försvarsunderrättelseverksamheten)
- Foreign Intelligence Court (Försvarsunderrättelsedomstolen)
- Agency for Defence Analysis (Myndigheten för totalförsvarsanalys)
- Coast Guard (Kustbevakningen)
- Psychological Defence Agency (Myndigheten för psykologiskt försvar)
- Civil Defence and Resilience Agency (Myndigheten för civil försvar)
- Accident Investigation Authority (Statens haverikommission)

== Government funds ==
- Gällöfsta Education Fund (Stiftelsen Gällöfsta utbildningscentrum)

== State-owned companies ==
- SOS Alarm AB, partly owned by the state (50%) with the other half being owned by the Swedish Association of Local Authorities and Regions.

== Areas of responsibility ==
- Military defence
- Emergency preparedness
- Civil defence

== Cabinet ministers ==
=== Ministers for Civil Defence ===
No.	Portrait	Name	Title	Took office	Left office	Time in office	Party	Prime Minister
1	Carl-Oskar Bohlin	Carl-Oskar Bohlin (born 1986)	Minister for Civil Defence	18 October 2022	Incumbent	3 years, 173 days	Moderate	Ulf Kristersson (M)

== See also ==
- Defence diplomacy
