= Västra Trädgårdsgatan =

Street in Stockholm, Sweden

Coordinates: 59.3306°N 18.0699°E

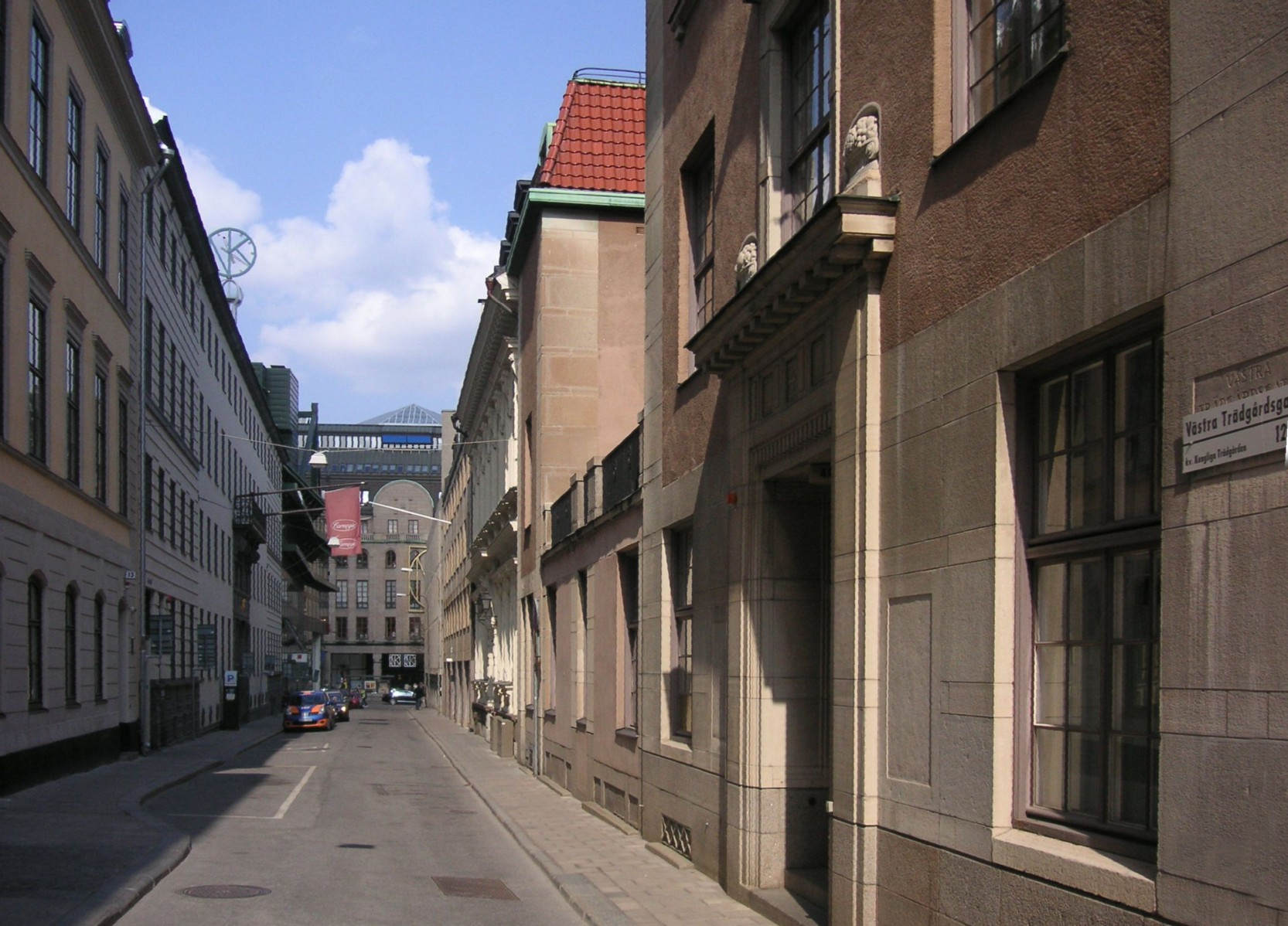
Västra Trädgårdsgatan in 2008

Västra Trädgårdsgatan is a street at Norrmalm in Stockholm, Sweden. The street stretches from Kungsträdgården to Hamngatan and to Jakobsgatan.

The Matchstick Palace is located on Västra Trädgårdsgatan.
