= Maria Christina Lindström =

Swedish businesswoman (1806–1895)

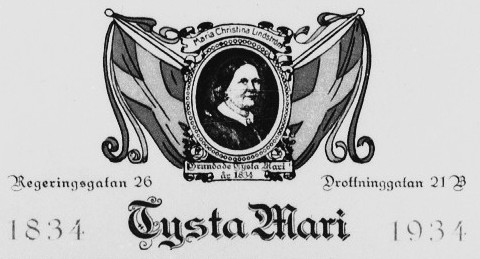
A Tysta Mari menu from 1934, depicting the founder Maria Christina Lindström

Maria "Mari" Christina Lindström (2 July 1806 – 28 March 1895 in Stockholm), was a Swedish coffee shop owner. She is known as the founder of the famous Tysta Mari café in Stockholm. She was known by her soubriquet Tysta Mari ("Quiet Marie"), which became the name for her famous café.

== Life ==
Mari Lindström was born in the Lindesberg Municipality. She settled in the capital as a girl, where she was employed as a serving girl at the Bianchini restaurant at Storkyrkobrinken in Gamla stan. She came up with the idea of founding a café focused on a female clientele. In 1834 she founded the first café for women in Stockholm, named Tysta Mari, at the crossroads of Drottninggatan and Jakobsgatan.

Her "ladies' café" became a success and was seen as an innovation and "The Ladies were delighted in the place from the start". This was a time period during which women normally did not eat in public as a leisure activity, which made Tysta Mari, where upper class ladies started to take coffee for pleasure because of the calm and discreet character, seen as an innovation.

Lindström and her café became known for their atmosphere of "quiet decency". The name Tysta Mari was originally the sobriquet given to her because of the discreet style she used when managing her café, which was appreciated by her female clientele. She adopted the name for her café, and had it named as such as well.

Lindström retired as a successful businesswoman in 1857 and left her café to her cousin Elise Granberg, who left it to the sisters Amalia and Mina Dammberg in 1879; all carried on the café in the tradition established by its founder. The Tysta Mari café was closed in 1954.

Mari Lindström was described by contemporary newspapers in her retirement as living a quiet and peaceful existence; at the age of 80, she was described as still looking like fifty, healthy and lovable and "with the same pleasant personality as in her younger years".

== Legacy ==
The walkway Tysta Marigången ("Silent Mari walkway") at Klara Västra kyrkogata in Stockholm was named after Tysta Mari.
