= Swedish Defence Conscription and Assessment Agency =

Swedish agency handling military conscription

Swedish Defence Conscription and Assessment Agency (Swedish: Totalförsvarets plikt- och prövningsverk or Plikt- och prövningsverket)

The Swedish Defence Conscription and Assessment Agency (Swedish: Totalförsvarets plikt- och prövningsverk or Plikt- och prövningsverket), previously the Swedish Defence Recruitment Agency (Swedish: Totalförsvarets rekryteringsmyndighet), sorting under the Swedish Ministry of Defence is a government agency in Sweden whose primary responsibility is to oversee tests, assessments, and recruitment- and admissions processes for the purpose of the Swedish conscription system. The agency also informs, summons, musters, and enrolls to Swedish basic military training, and takes decisions on applications from contentious objectors. In addition, the Swedish Conscription and Assessment Agency provides these service to certain professional occupations and educational programmes with special requirements related to the Swedish Armed Forces and the Swedish law enforcement. This includes the Swedish Officer's Programme, the Swedish Police training programme, the basic training courses of the Swedish Customs Service and the Swedish Coast Guard and other government agencies within the Swedish total defence. On the behalf of government agencies, municipalities and regions, the Swedish Defence Conscription and Assessment Agency also maintains a comprehensive national register of civilian wartime postings.

Pliktverket was established on 1 July 1995 as an administrative agency, taking over responsibilities from other agencies, in particular the former Värnpliktsverket (Conscription Agency). On 1 January 2011, following the government's decision to suspend conscription, Pliktverket changed its name to Rekryteringsmyndigheten (Swedish Defence Recruitment Agency). Following the new defence policies and priorities outlined in the 2020 Swedish Total Defence Bill, the agency's name was once again changed and on 1 February 2021, it became Totalförsvarets plikt- och prövningsverket.

The head office of the agency is located in Karlstad, in the Fanfaren complex, having previously been located in the Karolinen office buildings. The agency also has test offices (prövningskontor) in Stockholm, Gothenburg and Malmö, and is due to open a new office in Umeå following Budget 2025. The new office is estimated to be operational during the autumn of 2026.

The Swedish administrative structure for defence conscriptions and assessments would generally be considered unusual internationally, especially in relation to comparable Nordic countries with defence conscription, or national service. In Denmark, equivalent functions are performed by the Danish Ministry of Defence, through the Personelkommandoen (previously Forsvarsministeriets Personalestyrelse). In Finland, Regional Bureaus of the Finnish Defence Forces are responsible for these services. Similar in Norway, assessments and tests (sesjon) are conducted by the Norwegian Armed Forces themselves, through the Norwegian Armed Forces Personnel and Conscription Centre (Forsvarets personell- og vernepliktssenter).

The Director-General of the Swedish Defence Conscription and Assessment Agency is since 2025 Peter Göthe.
