= Tysta Mari (band) =

Swedish music band

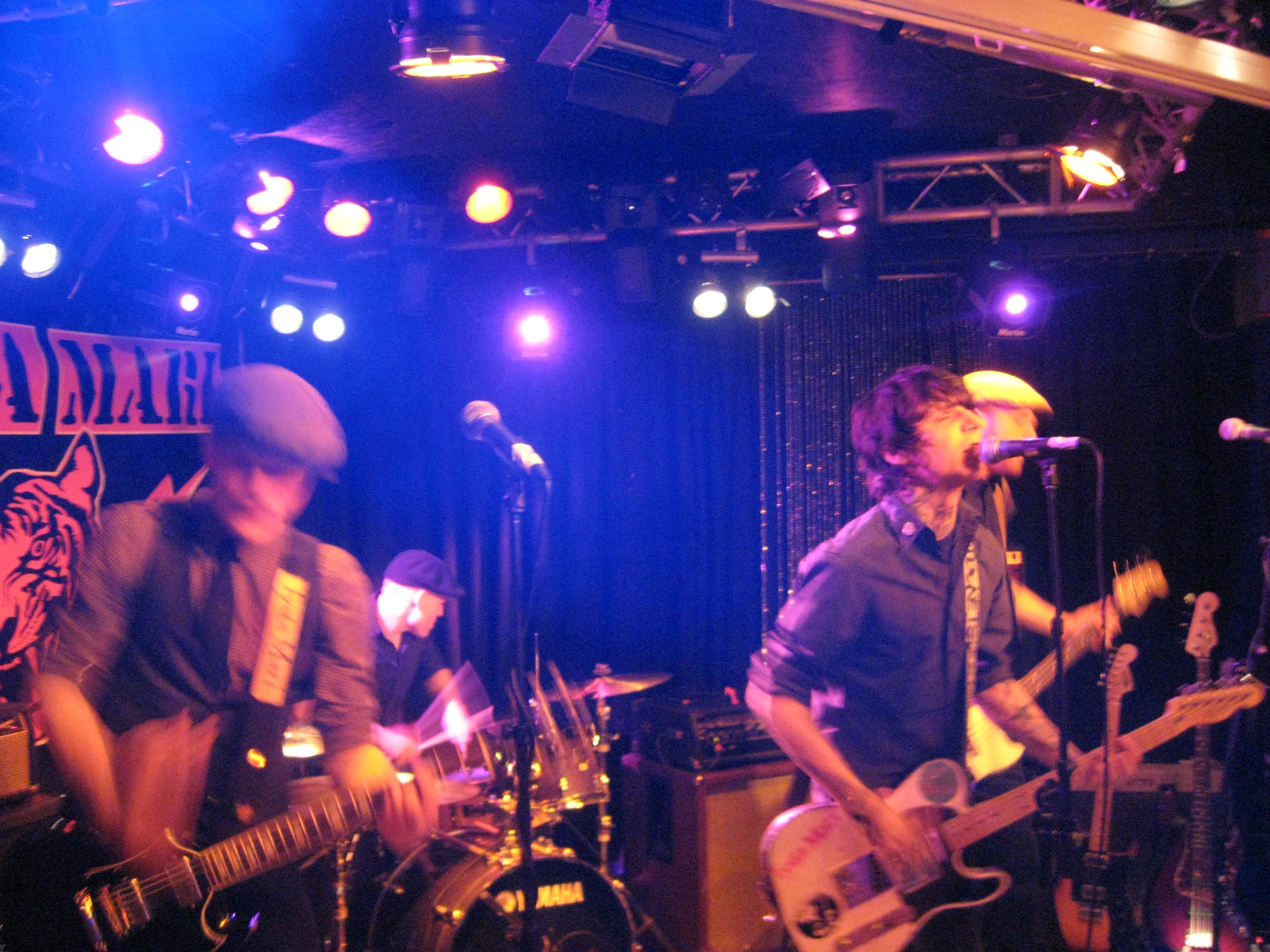
Tysta Mari, 2009

Tysta Mari is a Swedish punk band that takes its name from the walkway / arcade Tysta Marigången. The band is made up of Mike (vocals and bass), Adam (vocals and guitar), Alex (drums) and Andreas (guitar).

== Discography ==
=== Albums ===
Year	Album	Peak positions
Year	Album	SWE
2008	Tjugo minuter över tre	–
2009	Sverige Casino	–
2013	Musiken	41
