= Jakobsgatan =

Street in central Stockholm, Sweden

Coordinates: 59°19′49.4″N 18°4′10.9″E

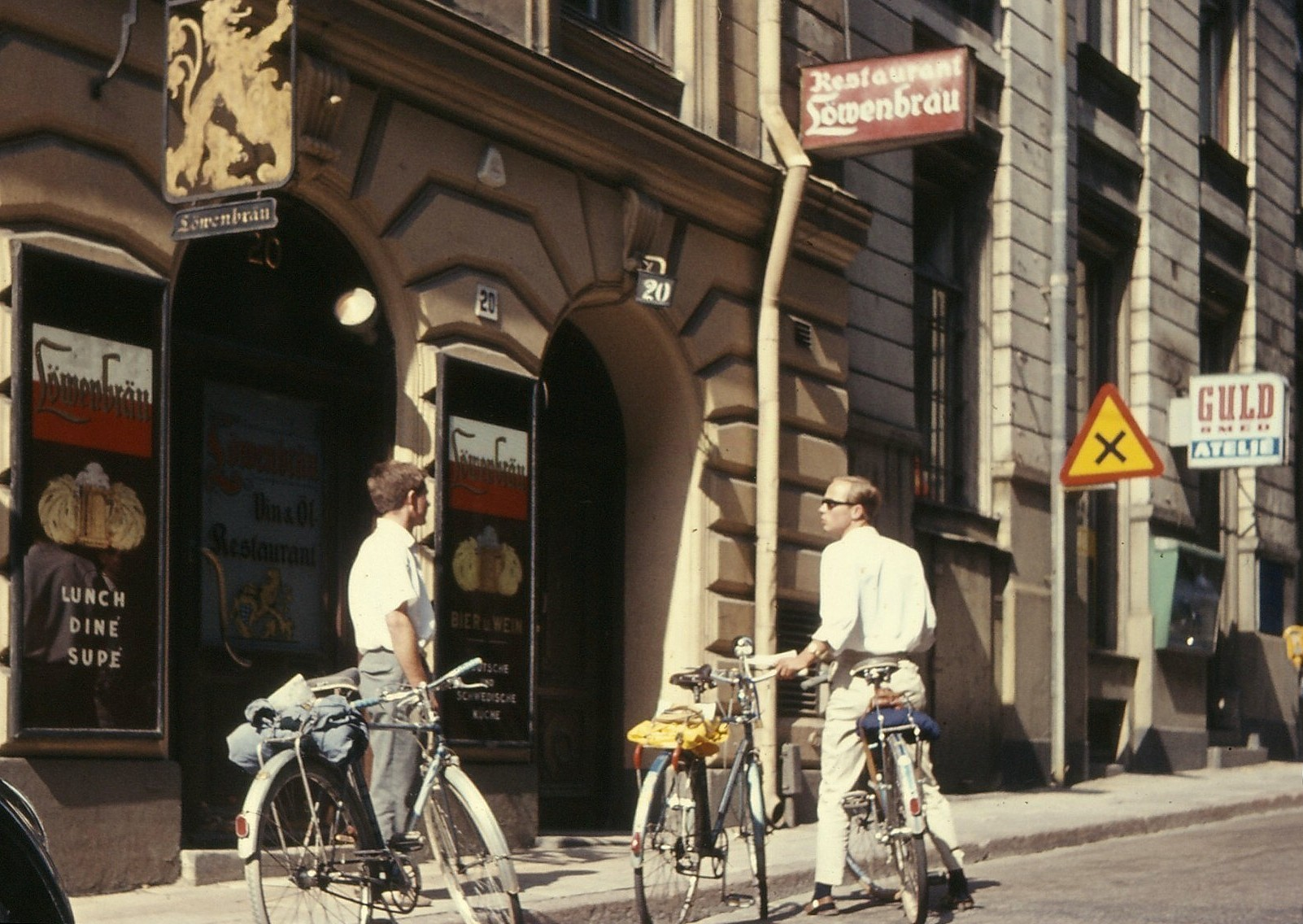
Jakobsgatan in 1963.

Jakobsgatan is a street at Norrmalm in central Stockholm, Sweden. The street stretches from west–east Tegelbacken in the west to Västra Trädgårdsgatan in the east. At Jakobsgatan several entertainment places can be found such as Hamburger Börs and Centralpalatset.
