= Karl W. Gullers =

Swedish photographer (1916–1998)

Karl Werner Gullers
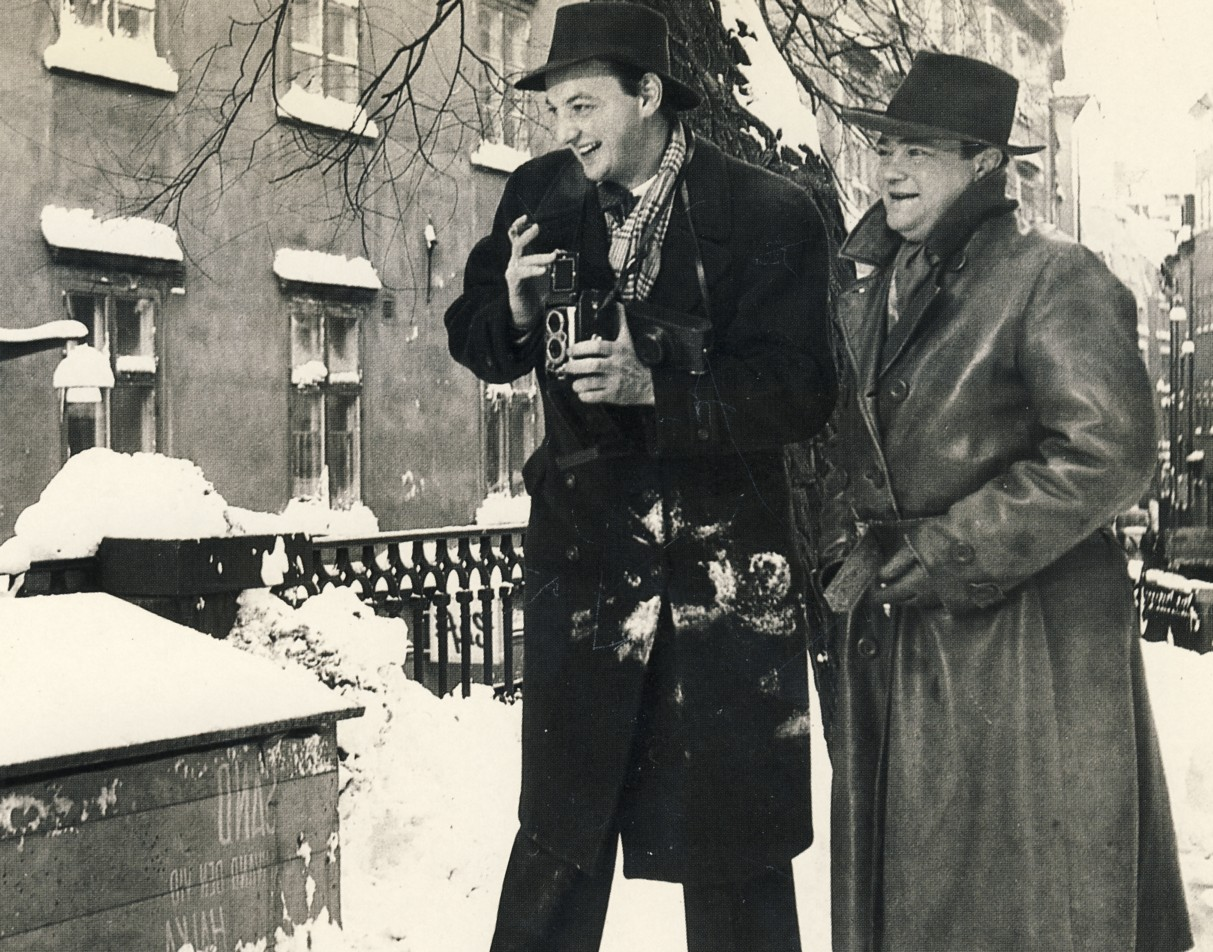
- The author Stig Trenter (right) with his fictional character Harry Friberg (the photographer Karl W. Gullers)
- Born: Karl Werner Edmund Gullers; 5 September 1916; Stockholm, Sweden
- Died: 21 February 1998 (aged 81); Stockholm, Sweden
- Education: Jan de Meyere
- Occupation: Photographer
- Years active: 1938–
- Spouse(s): Ingvor Alberts (m. 1937, divorced) Barbara H Donnelly (m. 1973; died 1993)
- Children: 4

Karl Werner Edmund Gullers (5 September 1916 – 21 February 1998), was a Swedish press and commercial photographer, and also the model for Stieg Trenter's crime novel Harry Friberg. Gullers established his photography business in 1938 under the name Studio Gullers and it was active until 1978.

== Early years ==
Gullers was born on 5 September 1916 in Stockholm, Sweden, the son of Emil Gullers, a lawyer, and his wife Anna (née Ågren). Gullers was one of five children of Emil, a lawyer and farmer's son from Rising, Östergötland (one of the founders of what is now the Swedish Liberal Party) and Anna Charlotta Gullers, a teacher. He grew up in Klara, the most central parish in Stockholm. He was brother of Arvid Gullers, and half-brother of Waldemar Gullers, Maj Amalia Gullers, Sigrid Augusta Järemo and Emil Ragnar Gullers. He frequently borrowed his brother's camera and at the age of twelve his father bought him his own, a Kodak Brownie box camera.

Three years later, in 1932, he began working for Anders Forsner, a leading photographer in Stockholm, who gave him his photographic education. He also photographed after hours, learning to use available light, which he continued to favour even for industrial photography. He was one of the founders of the blixthatarnas förening ('flash-haters association') for hard-core press photographers. At eighteen years old, he received a scholarship for a trip to England. The trip piqued his interest in photojournalism.

== Photography ==
Returning to Sweden, Gullers started working with photographer Jan de Meyere, known for his distinctive high-key portraits, at Kungsgatan 19, the street where Gullers had his studio for twenty years. He also worked as aerial photographer at Aeromateriel AB for three summers producing photographs for the first book depicting Sweden from the air.

In 1938 Gullers started its own company, Studio Gullers at St Eriksgatan in Stockholm which he operated for forty years. He later employed other photographers to assist with its burgeoning business; notably his son Peter Gullers who later became an architectural photographer and also published many books, Bo Trenter (son of his friend Steig), and Georg Sessler and Björn Enström who both worked there for twenty five years. Assisting were Gullers' then wife Ingvor and Magda Persson, a skilled copyist, both recruited from Jan de Meyere's studio. After few years at St. Eriksgatan, Studio Gullers moved into one of the 1906 Kungstorn tower blocks at Kungsgatan 30. Studio Gullers AB Gullers Production Ltd was also a book publisher.

On 1 September 1939, Gullers was enlisted at Västerås in 1940 and later was deployed as a war photographer. There he befriended Stieg Trenter who based his novel Harry Friberg on the photographer. They remained close until Trenters' death in 1967, and the writer's novels were used as the screenplays for a 1987 TV drama series in which the part of Harry Friberg was played by Örjan Ramberg; Träff i helfigur, Lysande landning, and Idag röd. In an accompanying TV Movie documentary Stieg Trenter - Ett porträtt, Gullers appeared as himself.

Immediately after the war Gullers went to the US where he produced work for magazines and some industrial photography. Fascinated with the photo-books that started appearing in the US about that time, and meeting many of the photographers who had produced them, he returned to Stockholm inspired. He found a publisher for a picture-book on Stockholm which came out in 1946. In 1947 Ziff-Davis in Chicago also published one of his earliest books. He started to spend about 200 days of the year travelling the world.

== Recognition and contribution ==
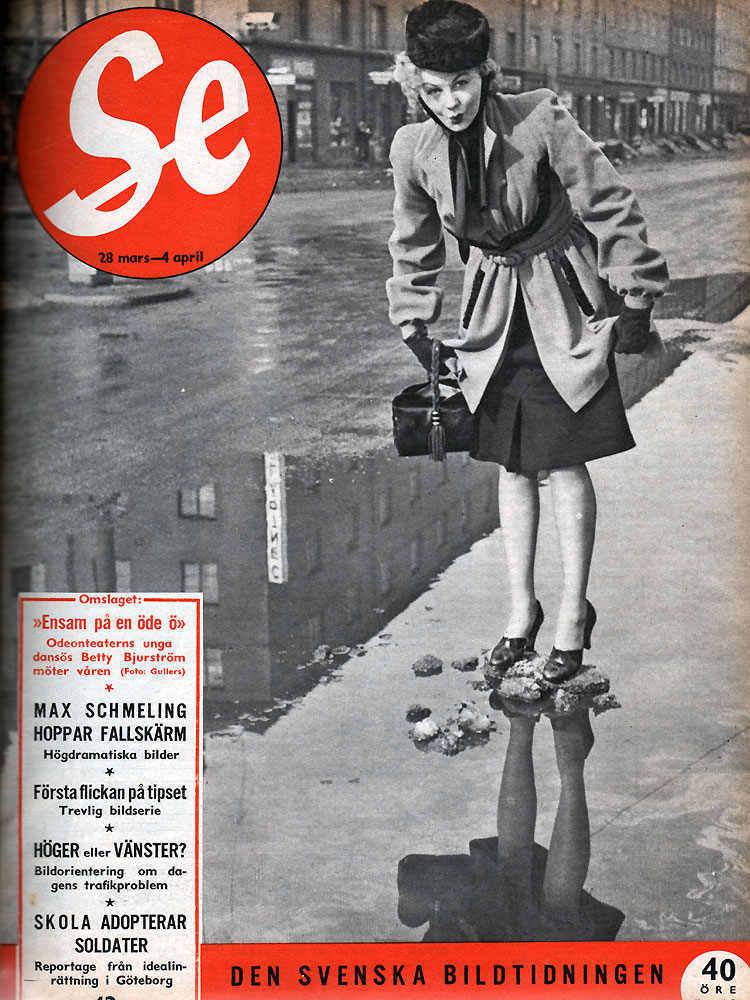
Betty Bjurström on the cover of SE, nr 13, 1941. Photographer: K.W. Gullers.

During the years 1938–46, Gullers contributed pictures to a series of Swedish and foreign journals, including Picture Post, Illustrated, Se and Vi, and also wrote articles himself. Gullers had his first exhibition, "A bit of Sweden" in London in 1942. The pictures were primarily from his documentation of Sweden during the War and propaganda he produced for the government, but also of Swedish industry. In the spring of 1945 he made around 30 photographs in Malmö of the arrival and recovery of former concentration camp prisoners for Vi. The impact of his photographs influenced the Swedish aid effort.

In 1953, Gullers became chairman of Svenska Fotografers Förbund (SFF). Over four years as chairman he worked with, inter alia, Kerstin Bernhard and Karl Sandel on training standards and legal and pricing issues. He was succeeded by Curt Götlin. Gullers was also active in the Nordiska fotografförbundet (‘Nordic Photographic Association’) for fifteen years and was a founding member of Europhot (European Association for the Photographer).

He was included in Postwar European Photography, 26 May to 23 August 1953, at the Museum of Modern Art. Gullers' representation of Swedish poverty, a Karelian grandmother embracing her granddaughter on a low bed, her bare feet resting on worn floorboards as she rocks a baby in a makeshift cradle, was seen by Edward Steichen. He selected it for the 1955 world-touring Museum of Modern Art exhibition The Family of Man seen by 9 million visitors.

From 1957 Gullers became one of the first Stockholm studios with its own Type C colour laboratory, for twelve years producing thousands of photographs a week, and for commissions from major Swedish companies ASEA, Astra, Fiskeby, Volvo, Svenska Metallverken, Stora, Kopparberg, Möln-lycke Väfveriakriebolag, amongst others, exclusively using the Swedish medium-format Hasselblad camera. As a result, his books were from then on exclusively in colour. He presented Swedish Industry in Colour, an exhibition that was part of the Sweden Comes to Britain 1961–62 campaign at the Federation of British Industries headquarters, in Tothill Street, London and colour printing of the 85 images was funded by the commissioning companies.

Gullers was the first Swedish photojournalist to have a solo exhibition in Sweden, at the gallery De Unga in Stockholm, following international exhibitions of his work held in London, New York and Chicago, and elsewhere. In 1963, Studio Gullers celebrated its twenty-fifth birthday with a major exhibition at the Ealing Technical College March 19–31, and the book Made in Sweden.

== Legacy ==
In 1990, the Nordic Museum purchased Guller's collection of pictures from 1938 to 1978. The collection consists of approximately 470,000 negatives, monochrome and colour, most in 6x6 format. There are also approximately 5,000 archival copies of size 24x30 cm and over 100,000 contact sheets. The collection also includes a negative ledger, a copy of the first editions of sixty-two book titles, press releases and two cameras; his Kodak Brownie and a Rolleiflex. Among subjects of his portraits are Charlie Chaplin (1945), Ingrid Bergman (1945), Ingrid Bergman and Alfred Hitchcock (1946), Gregory Peck (1945), Orson Welles (1952), John Steinbeck (1947), Bruno Mathsson (1951), Duke Ellington (1945), Prince Bertil (1940s), Astrid Lindgren (1952), and Carl XVI Gustaf (1952)

== Personal life ==
In 1937, Gullers married Ingvor Alberts (4 April 1914 – 21 August 2009), the daugher of the civil engineer Karl Alberts and Ester (née Palmquist). They had a son Peter (born 1938), and three daughters Lena Gullers Branderud, Ingela Rudebeck Gullers (1949–1973), and Kristina Gullers (Levander).

In 1973, Gullers married Barbara H Donnelly (1928–1993).

== Death ==
Gullers died on 21 February 1998 in Högalid Parish Stockholm, Sweden. He was interred in the Gullers family grave at St. Mary's Cemetery on 14 March 1998.

== Exhibitions ==
- 1946: Jan 20–Feb 3, Sweden: A Workshop of Democracy, American Swedish Historical Museum, solo show of fifty photographs.
- 1948 solo show, De Unga Gallery, Stockholm
- 1960 Swedish Industry in Colour during 'Sweden Comes to Britain 1961–62' exposition at the Federation of British Industries headquarters, Tothill Street, London
- 1963 solo show at Ealing Technical College, London, March 19–31.
- 1993 KW Gullers: Photo Memories, Mölndal museum
- 2013: Jan 16–Aug 18 Folkhemmets kändisar ('Celebrity Photographs'), group exhibition from the collection, Nordiska Museet.
- 2013-2015: images included in travelling group exhibition Folkhemmets room, Nordiska Museet.

== Bibliography ==
Gullers founded his own publisher Guller, which under his management released more than 80 photo books.

- Asklund, Erik; Gullers K. W. (1946). Stockholm - sommarstaden. Stockholm: Kooperativa förb. Libris 1387945 - Also available in English, French and German.
- Gullers, K. W.; Reichardt Howard E. (1947) (på eng). Sweden. Chicago: Ziff-Davis Pub. Co. Libris 1739777
- Munthe, Gustaf; Gullers K. W. (1947). Göteborg - hamnstaden. Stockholm: Vi/Kooperativa förb. Libris 1411241 - Also in English and Spanish.
- Munthe, Gustaf; Gullers K. W. (1948). Sverige från luften. Stockholm: Kooperativa förb. Libris 1411242 - Also in English and German.
- Gullers, K. W.; Trenter Stieg (1949). Italien. Stockholm: Kooperativa förb. Libris 1971249
- Gullers, K. W.; Asklund Erik (1949). Stockholm bakom fasaden. Stockholm: Koop. förb. Libris 1462606
- Munthe, Gustaf; Gullers K. W. (1949). Mölnlycke väfveri aktiebolag 100 år. Göteborg. Libris 8210843
- Lyttkens, Alice; Gullers K. W. (1950). I kvinnans värld. Stockholm: Kooperativa förb. Libris 1402455
- Gullers, K. W.; Johnson Eyvind (1951). England. Stockholm: Veckotidningen Vi/Kooperativa förb. Libris 1451951
- Gullers, K. W.; Hoel Sigurd (1951). Norge. Glimtar av ett stort litet land. [Stockholm]: KF. Libris 1451961 - Also in Norwegian
- Gullers, K. W.; Woxén Ragnar, Strömberg C.A. (1952). Teknis i build: KTH : research and technical education in Sweden. Stockholm: Strömberg. Libris 736976
- Gullers, K. W. (1952). Gullers nya Sverigebok: en resa i bilder. Stockholm: P. A. Norstedt & Söner. Libris 2677968 - Also in English* Gullers, K. W.; Trenter Stieg (1953). Gamla stan. Stockholm: Norstedt. Libris 1451965 Also in English and German.
- Gullers, K. W.; Munthe Gustaf (1953). Norrköping: staden vid strömmen. Stockholm: Sv. turistförl. Libris 1451963 - Also in English
- 1954 Gullers, K. W. (1954). Sverige - vårt land: färgbilder. Stockholm: Norstedt. Libris 1451960 - Also in English, French, Spanish and German
- Gullers, K. W. (1954). Foto för alla. Stockholm: Norstedt. Libris 1451952 _ Also in Danish, Finnish and Norwegian
- Steichen, Edward; Norman, Dorothy (1955). Mason, Jerry (ed.). The family of man : the photographic exhibition. Sandburg, Carl, (writer of foreword), Lionni, Leo, (book designer), Stoller, Ezra, (photographer). New York, N.Y.: Museum of Modern Art / Maco Magazine Corporation.
- Andersson, Ingvar (1955). Uddeholm: Värmlandsbruk med världsrykte. [Uddeholm]: [Uddeholms AB]. Libris 1433896 - Also in English
- Gullers, K. W. (1956). Sverige, vattenland. Stockholm: Norstedt. Libris 1995196 - Also available in English, French and German.
- Gullers, Ingvor; Gullers K. W. (1957). Jul. Stockholm: Norstedt. Libris 10542220 - Also in English and German.
- Möllerström, Sten; Eksell Olle, Gullers K. W. (1957). The metal way: en bildberättelse om AB Svenska metallverken. Stockholm: Sv. metallverken. Libris 1181524 Also in English, Portuguese, Spanish and German.
- Linklater, Eric; Gullers K. W. (1958) (på eng). Karina with love. London: Macmillan. Libris 1754995
- Gullers, K. W.; Tjerneld Staffan (1959). De lyckliga åren. Stockholm: Norstedt. Libris 2008487 - Also in English
- Gullers K. W., Jonson Björn, Trenter Stieg, red (1960). Huset vid Skanstull: en bok om Folksamhuset. En titt på vårt grannskaps historia. Stockholm: Rabén & Sjögren (distr.). Libris 1807232 - Also in English
- Gullers, K. W.; Trenter Stieg (1960). Italien ([Ny utg.]). Stockholm: Vingförl. Libris 1879842 - Also in English and Dutch
- (på mul) KF: bildberättelse om KF:s industriföretag. Stockholm: KF. 1960. Libris 754288
- Trenter, Stieg; Gullers K. W. (1962). Mölnlycke AB. Göteborg: Studio Gullers. Libris 9986479
- Gullers, K. W.; Nordström Alf (1963). Sverige: en resa genom tiderna. Stockholm. Libris 785774 - Also in English and French
- Trenter, Stieg; Kumlien Bertil, Gullers K. W. (1963). Wikmanshyttan: en modern svensk industri med gamla traditioner. Stockholm: Gullersproduktion. Libris 2872495
- Gullers, K. W.; Strandh Sigvard, Gullers Peter (1963). Made in Sweden. Stockholm: Almqvist & Wiksell. Libris 833818 - Also in English, French, Spanish and German
- Gullers, K. W.; Linklater Eric, Trenter Stieg (1964). Gullers Sverige. Stockholm: Almqvist & Wiksell/ Geber. Libris 8081169 - Also in English and German.
- Gullers K. W., red (1965) (på eng). Wifstavarf. [Sundsvall]: [Sv. cellulosa AB]. Libris 1461467
- Gullers, K. W.; Rock Robert (1965). Sverige/ K.W. Gullers; [text: Robert Rock]. Stockholm: Almqvist & Wiksell: Gebers. Libris 8560266 - Also in English, French, Spanish and German
- Gullers, K. W.; Vahlberg Stellan, Gullers Peter (1965). Svenskar i samverkan.. Stockholm: Rabén & Sjögren. Libris 754282 - Also in English and German.
- Gullers, K. W.; Olsson K. W., Eksell Olle (1967). Sieverts kabelverk. Stockholm: Gullersproduktion. Libris 10894704
- Gullers, Peter; Gullers K. W., Rock Robert (1968). A bit of Sweden: en bildberättelse om Finspång. Stockholm: Gullersproduktion. Libris 2250840 - Also in English
- Gullers, K. W.; Gullers Peter, Strandh Sigvard (1968). Sverige jorden runt. Stockholm: Almqvist & Wiksell/Geber. Libris 2793078 - Also in English, French, Spanish and German
- Fisher, Max Herbert; Gullers Peter, Gullers K. W. (1968). Stora Kopparberg. Stockholm: Gullersproduktion. Libris 1694067
- Gullers, K. W.; Pers Anders H. (1969). Sverige - USA: fakta, bilder, tankar kring förbindelserna Sverige - USA. [En Geber pocket]. Stockholm: [Geber]. Libris 804463
- K. W. (1969). Knäpp!: fotobok för alla. Stockholm: Gullersproduktion. Libris 2082637
- Gullers, K. W.; Gullers Peter, Strandh Sigvard, Lundström Stig (1970). Sverige, ditt nya land: Švedska, vaš novi dom. Stockholm: SAF. Libris 2793073 - Also in English, Finnish, French, Spanish and German
- Gullers K. W., Rock Robert, red (1970). Värnamo 1970. Värnamo: Lions club. Libris 1833085
- Gullers, K. W.; Gullers Peter (1970) (på fre). France-Suède: les relations France-Suède : réalitéts, images et échanges de vues. En Geber pocket, 99–0125087–0. Stockholm: Geber. Libris 1833061
- Gullers, K. W.; Ehrenmark Torsten, Gullers Peter (1972). Sveriges ansikte. Stockholm: Gullersproduktion/Almqvist & Wiksell. Libris 1881904 - Also in English, French, Spanish and German
- Gullers, K. W.; Nycop Carl-Adam (1974). Då: våra beredskapsår 1939–1945. Stockholm: Forum. Libris 7254035. ISBN 91-37-05708-1
- Gullers, Barbara; Gullers K. W. (1974). Handarbete på nytt sätt sett. Stockholm: Gullers produktion. Libris 7746688. ISBN 91-85228-03-6 - Also in English, Finnish, Dutch, Japanese and Norwegian
- Ek, Stig; Gullers K. W. (1975). Boliden 50. Stockholm: Boliden AB. Libris 691398 - Also in English
- Enström Björn, Gullers K. W., Sundblad Bo, red (1976) (på eng). Sea songs. Stockholm: Gullers international. Libris 7746700. ISBN 91-85228-16-8 (inb.)
- Andersson J. Holger, Gullers Peter, red (1976). SL 100. [Stockholm]: [Gullersproduktion i samarbete med Storstockholms lokaltrafik]. Libris 7746699. ISBN 91-85228-15-X (inb.)
- Gullers, K. W.; Enström Björn, Segerstedt Torgny T. (1976). Uppsala universitet 500. Stockholm: Gullers international. Libris 7746702. ISBN 91-85228-18-4 (inb.) - Also in English
- Gullers, K. W.; Enström Björn, Ehrenmark Torsten (1977). Dalsland. Stockholm: Gullers international. Libris 7746704. ISBN 91-85228-21-4 (inb.) - Also in English
- Gullers, K. W.; Strandell Birger (1977). Linnés Sverige. [Stockholm]: [Gullers produktion]. Libris 7746720. ISBN 91-85228-40-0 (inb.) - Also available in English, French and German.
- Gullers, K. W.; Gullers Peter, Enström Björn, Strandh Sigvard (1977). Vad Sverige kan. Höganäs: Bra böcker. Libris 175048 - Also in English, French, Russian, Spanish and German.
- Gullers, K. W.; Gullers Peter, Enström Björn, Arvidson Gunnar (1978). En glimt av Sverige. Stockholm: Gullers international. Libris 7746711. ISBN 91-85228-31-1 (inb.)
- Gullers, K. W.; Ehrenmark Torsten, Enström Björn (1978). Pripps 150 år: 1828-1978 : kunskap kvalitet. Stockholm: Gullersproduktion. Libris 7746707. ISBN 91-85228-25-7
- Gullers, K. W.; Tibblin Gösta (1979). Må bättre! Sluta röka: en rökfri generation?. Stockholm: Gullers international. Libris 7746721. ISBN 91-85228-41-9
- Gullers, K. W.; Gullers Peter, Enström Björn, Ahnlund Henrik, Hagberg Ulf Erik (1979). Västergötland. Stockholm: Gullers international. Libris 7746732. ISBN 91-85228-56-7 (inb.)
- Gullers, K. W.; Nyström Per, Enström Björn (1980) (på ger). Göteborg. Stockholm: Gullers international. Libris 7746733. ISBN 91-85228-57-5 (inb.)
- Gullers, K. W.; Enström Björn, Gullers Peter, Wilhelm Peter (1980). Svenskt know-how i 80-talet. Stockholm: Gullers international. Libris 7746749. ISBN 91-85228-78-8 (inb.)
- Gullers, K. W.; Karlsson Lars Olov, Enström Björn, Alrenius Carl Axel (1981). Statens järnvägar 125 år. Stockholm: Gullers international. Libris 7746740. ISBN 91-85228-65-6 (inb.)
- Segerstedt, Torgny T.; Rydberg Sven, Skole Robert, Gullers K. W. (1982). Marcus Wallenberg: en bildberättelse. Stockholm: Gullers pictorial. Libris 7758083. ISBN 91-86440-00-4 (inb.)
- Rydberg, Sven; Gullers Peter, Gullers K. W. (1983). Möte med Munters. Stockholm: Gullers pictorial. Libris 7758086. ISBN 91-86440-06-3 (inb.)
- Gullers, K. W. (1984). Bildminnen: 50 år med kameran. Stockholm: Bonnier fakta. Libris 7246914. ISBN 91-34-50408-7 (inb.)
- Skole, Robert; Gullers K. W., Forsberg Karl-Erik (1984) (på eng). USA, Sweden. Stockholm: Gullers pictorial. Libris 7758088. ISBN 91-86440-12-8 (inb.)
- Gullers, K. W.; Rock Robert, Hambræus Gunnar, Gullers Peter (1985). Industrin är Sverige!. Stockholm: Gullers pictorial. Libris 7758089. ISBN 91-86440-14-4 (inb.)
- Trenter, Stieg; Gullers K. W., Widerberg Bertil R., Lundin Bo, Harry Studio, Nilsson Lennart, Trenter Bo (1987). Stieg Trenters Stockholm. Stockholm: Bonnier. Libris 7147466. ISBN 91-0-047327-8 (inb.)
- Arvidson, Gunnar; Gullers Peter, Gullers K. W. (1988). Det handlar om- ICA: en rundresa i ord och build genom ICA Sverige. Stockholm: Gullers Pictorial. Libris 7758100. ISBN 91-86440-36-5 (inb.)
- Wallén, Thord; Gullers K. W. (1990). Arbeta med förtroende: intervjuer med förtroendevalda och ombudsmän inom Svenska industritjänstemannaförbundet. Stockholm: Svenska industritjänstemannaförb. (SIF). Libris 7677871. ISBN 91-7968-059-3
- Larsson, Mats-Arne; Gullers K. W., Feinsilber Marika (1991). Stora som små. Bromma: Opal. Libris 1219463. ISBN 91-7270-622-8 (inb.)
- Gullers, K. W.; Friedrichs Johan von, Willis Göran, Bengtsson Staffan (1995). Min tid. Stockholm: Nordiska museet. Libris 7603779. ISBN 91-7108-379-0 (inb.)
- Gullers, K. W.; Braw Daniel (2010). När vi byggde landet: KW Gullers bilder av efterkrigstidens Sverige. Örebro: Gullers. Libris 11814685. ISBN 978-91-85957-11-8 (inb.)

== Stills photographer ==
Gullers was stills photographer on several TV dramas written by Steig Trenter

- 1987 Träff i helfigur (TV Movie) (still photographer - as K W Gullers)
- 1987 Lysande landning (TV Movie) (still photographer - as K W Gullers)
- 1987 Idag röd (TV Movie) (still photographer - as K W Gullers)

== Pictures by Karl W. Gullers ==
=== Portraits ===
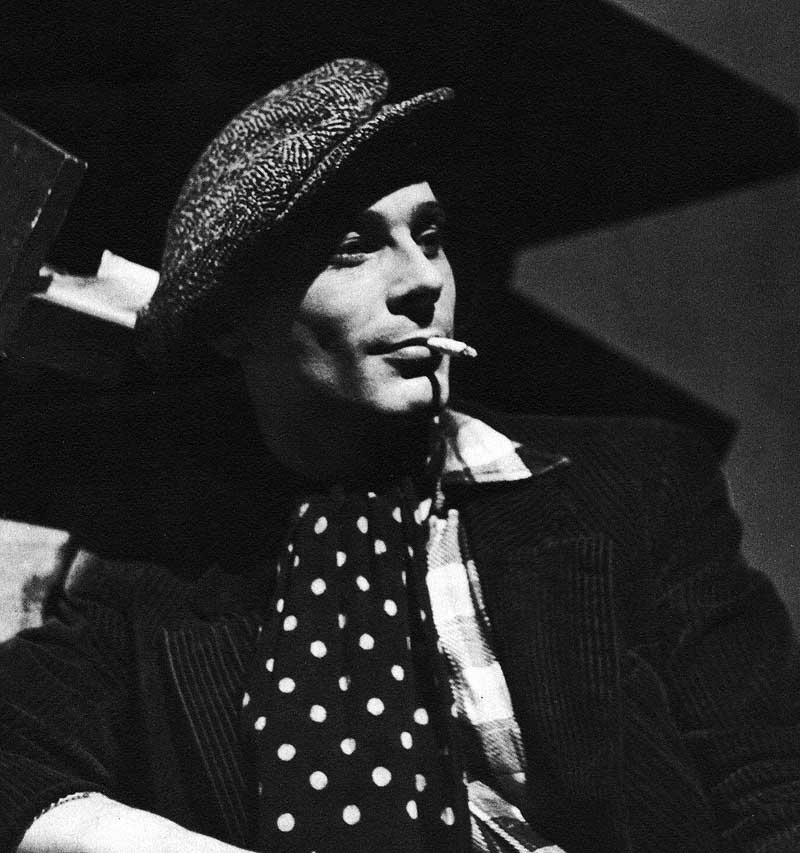
Nils Kihlberg, 1950

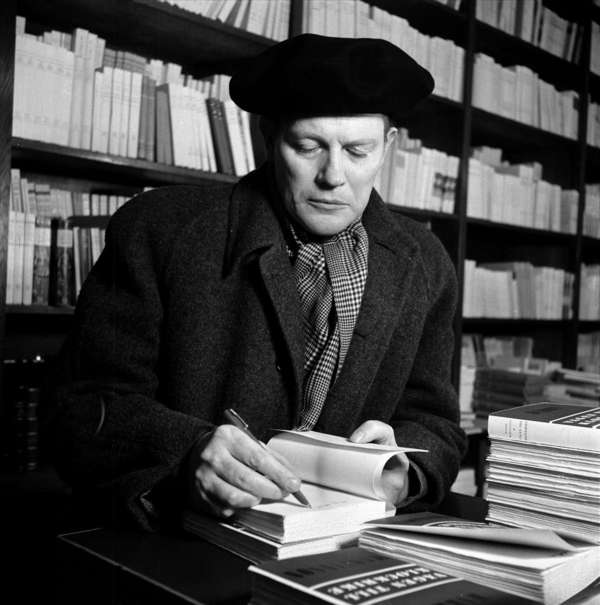
Harry Martinson, 1948

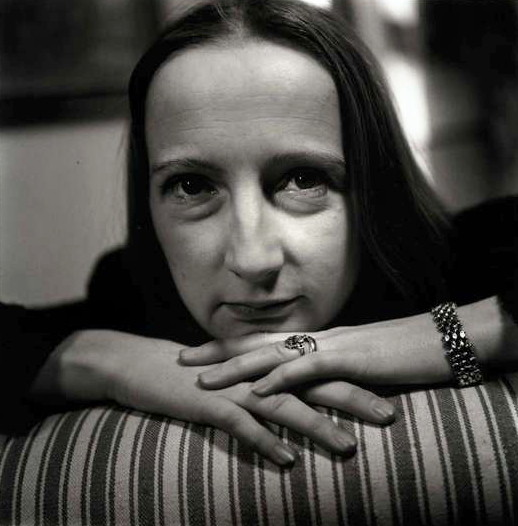
Birgit Cullberg, 1943

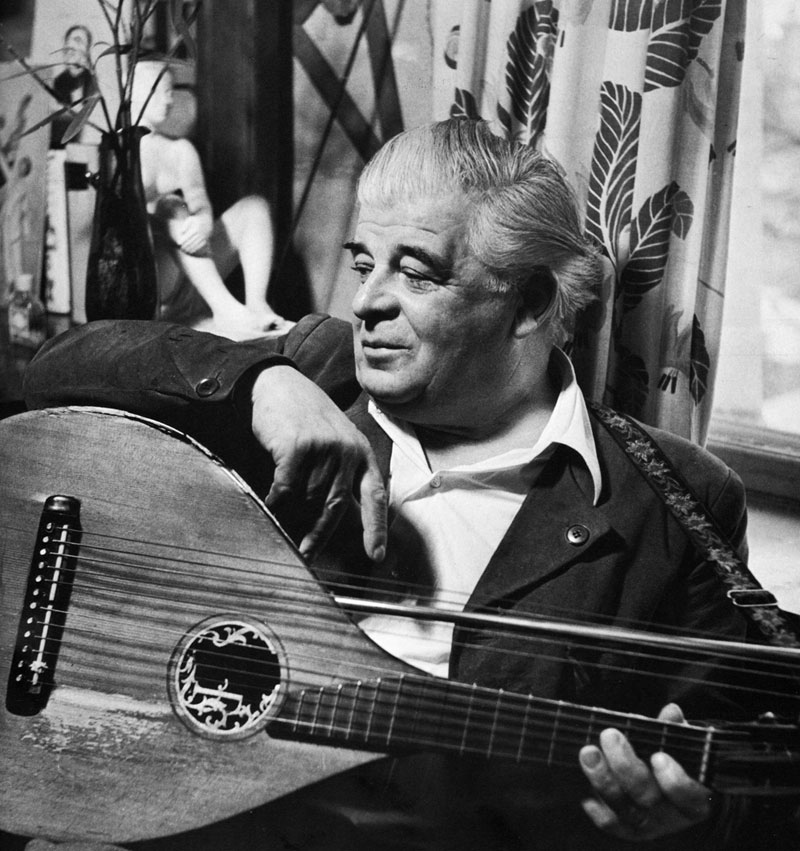
Evert Taube, 1953

=== Other subjects ===
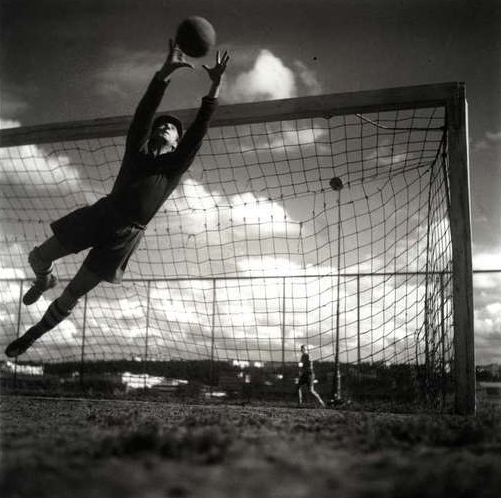
Sven Bergqvist, 1943

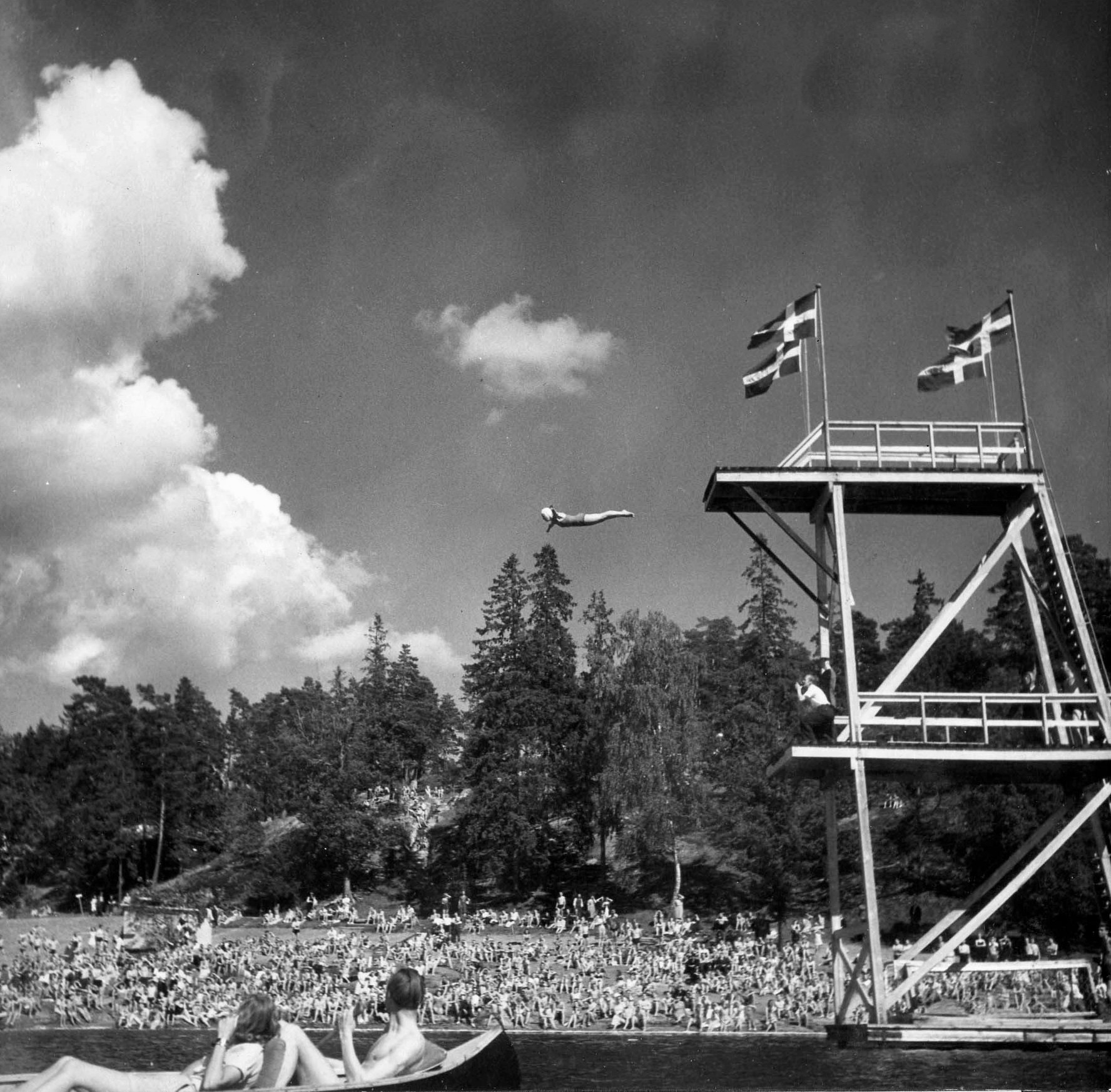
Flatenbadet Diving Tower, 1943

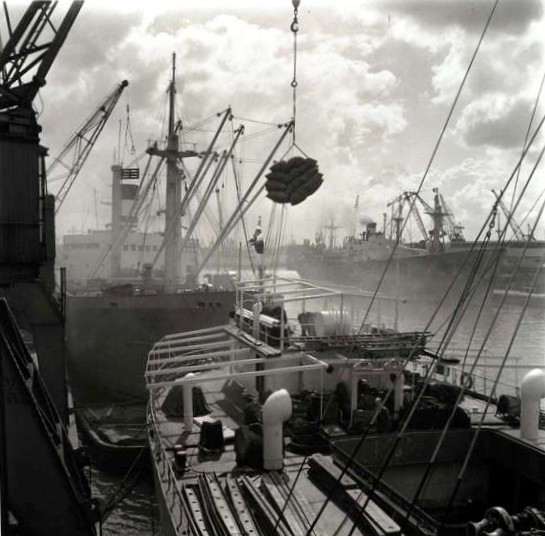
The port of Göteborg, 1947

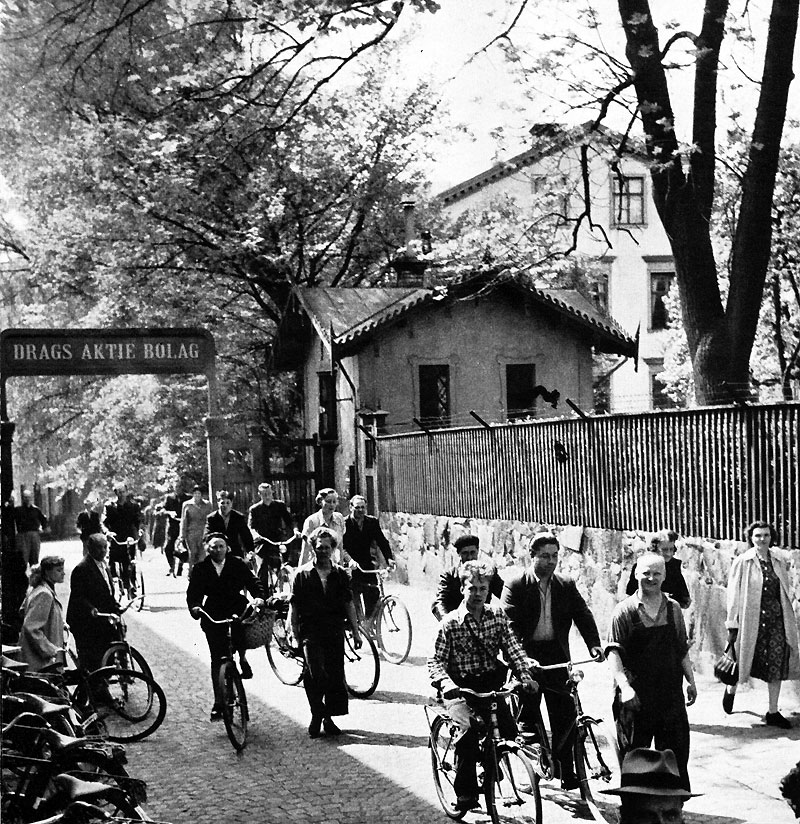
Drags Aktie Company, 1953
