= Centralpalatset =

Building in Norrmalm, Stockholm, Sweden

Coordinates: 59.3285°N 18.0632°E

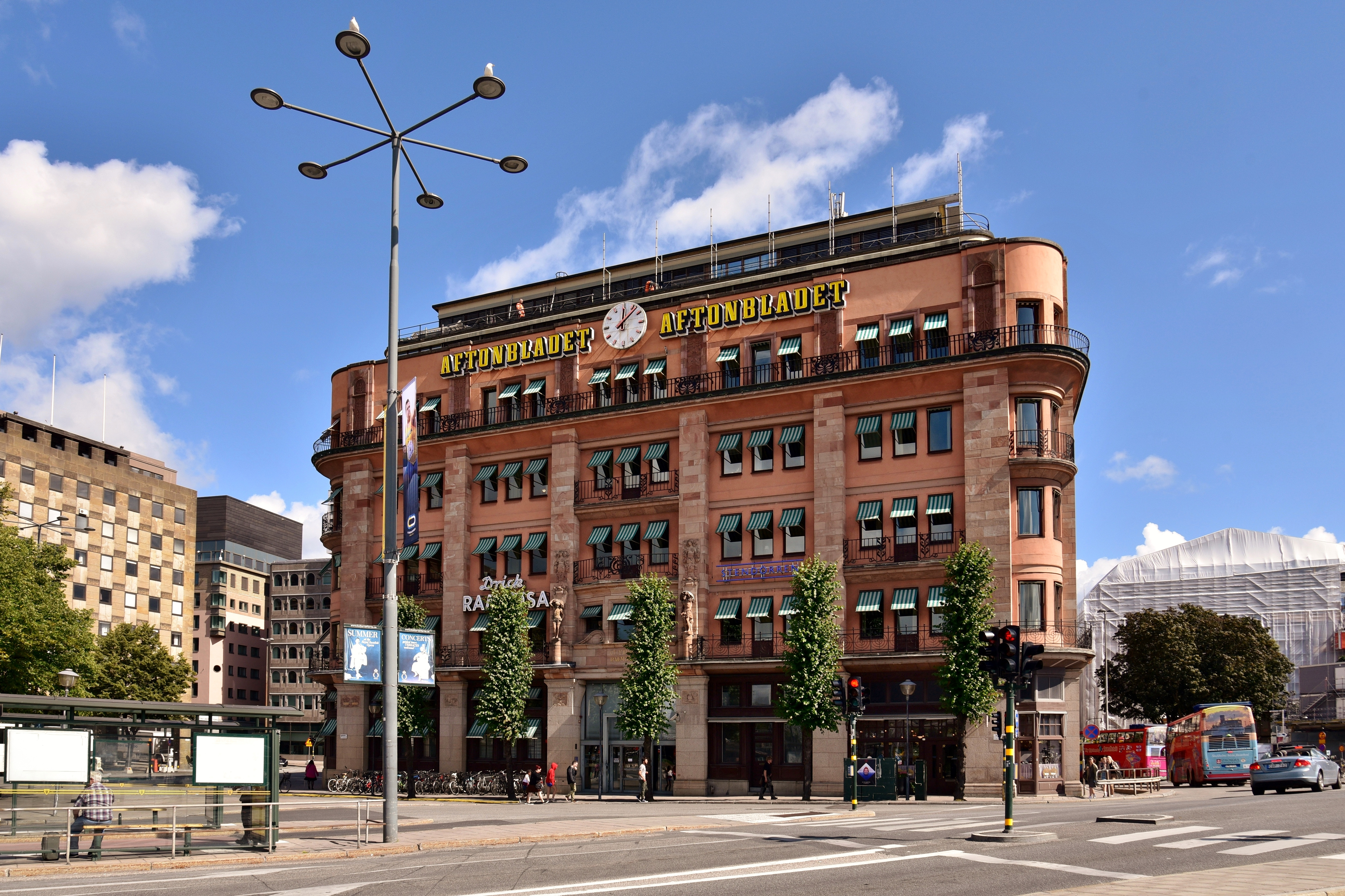
Centralpalatset at Tegelbacken.

Centralpalatset is a building at Norrmalm in central Stockholm at the Tegelbacken street. The architect for the building was Ernst Stenhammar and the house was built in 1896 throughout to 1998. Today Centralpalatsen is the housing the Ministry of the Environment and at the bottom floor lies the Japanese restaurant Seikoen.
