= Tegelbacken =

Square in central Stockholm, Sweden

Coordinates: 59.3283°N 18.0614°E

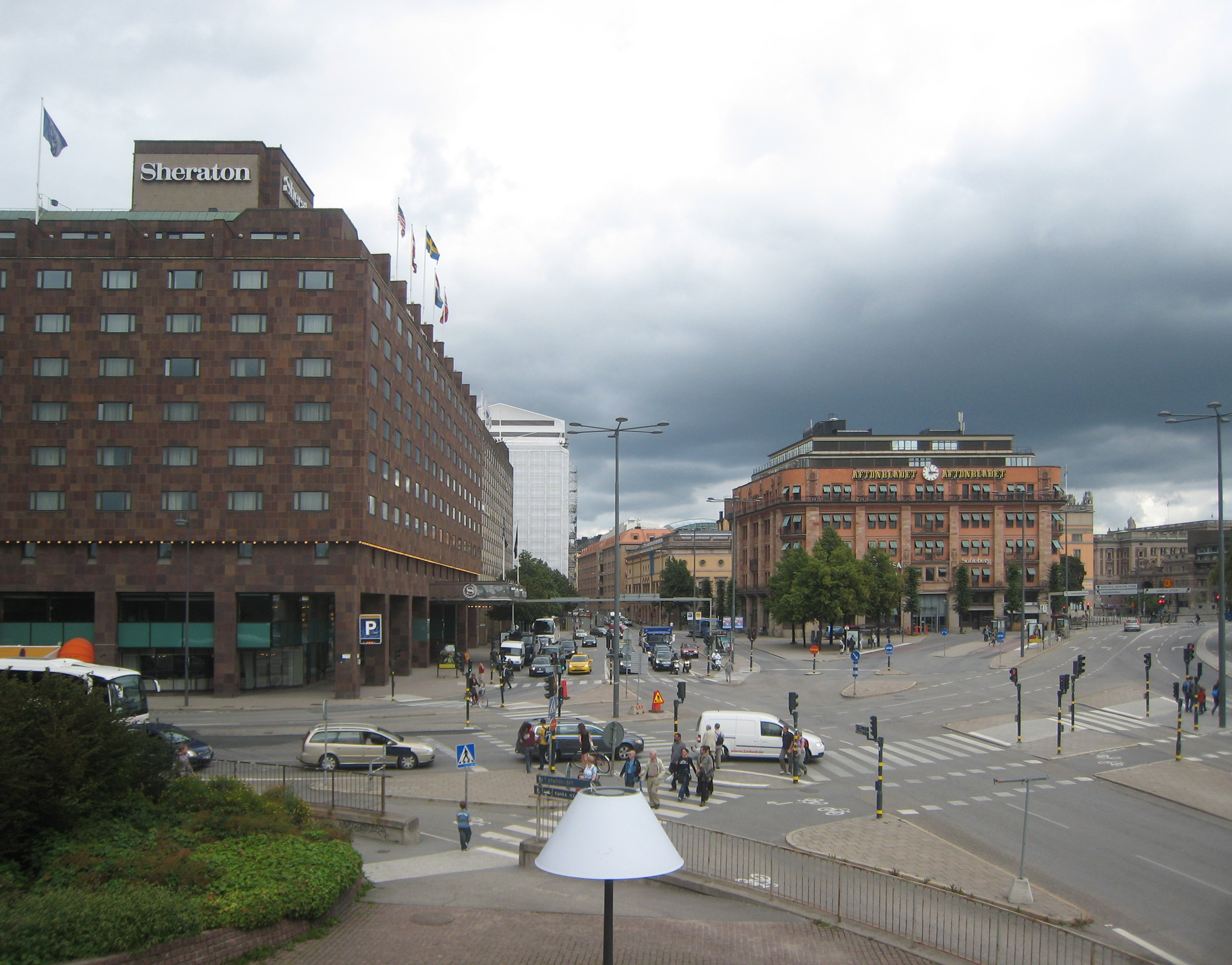
Tegelbacken in 2010 as seen from Centralbron

Tegelbacken is a junction at Norrmalm in Central Stockholm and the name of several streets that contains the junction. At Tegelbacken, the traffic are connected to the Centralbron, Vasabron, Nynäsvägen and Gamla stan.
