= List of governors of Malmöhus County =

This is a list of governors of Malmöhus County of Sweden from 1719 to its dissolution in 1996, when it was merged with Kristianstad County to form Skåne County.

- Carl Gustaf Hård (1719–1727)
- Johan Cronman (1727–1737)
- Wilhelm Bennet (1737–1740)
- Carl Georg Siöblad (1740–1754)
- Georg Bogislaus Staël von Holstein (1754–1763)
- Carl Adlerfelt (1764–1769)
- Johan Cronhielm (1769–1772)
- Reinhold Johan von Lingen (1772)
- Bengt Gustaf Frölich (1772–1776)
- Tage Thott (1776–1794)
- Gustaf von Rosen (1794–1812)
- Wilhelm af Klinteberg (1812–1829)
- Jean Albrecht Berg von Linde (1829–1831)
- Magnus Stackelberg (1831–1833)
- Fredrik Posse (1834–1851)
- Samuel von Troil (1851–1874)
- Axel Gustav Adlercreutz (1874–1880)
- Gotthard Wachtmeister (1880–1892)
- Robert Dickson (1892–1902)
- Gustaf Tornérhjelm (1902–1909)
- Robert de la Gardie (1909–1925)
- Fredrik Ramel (1925–1938)
- Arthur Thomson (1939–1951)
- Allan Vougt (1951–1953)
- Gustav Adolf Widell (1953–1961)
- Gösta Netzén (1961–1973)
- Nils Hörjel (1973–1984)
- Bertil Göransson (governor) (1984–1993)
- Ann-Cathrine Haglund (1993–1996)
