= Ernst Trygger =

Swedish politician (1857–1943)

His Excellency Ernst Trygger
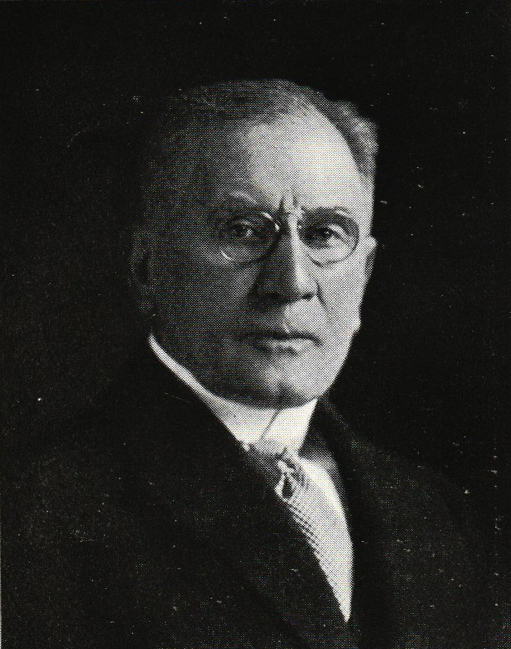
- Trygger c. 1928

Prime Minister of Sweden
- In office 19 April 1923 – 18 October 1924
- Monarch: Gustaf V
- Preceded by: Hjalmar Branting
- Succeeded by: Hjalmar Branting

Minister of Foreign Affairs
- In office 2 October 1928 – 7 June 1930
- Prime Minister: Arvid Lindman
- Preceded by: Eliel Löfgren
- Succeeded by: Fredrik Ramel

Personal details
- Born: 27 October 1857 Stockholm, Sweden
- Died: 23 September 1943 (aged 85) Stockholm, Sweden
- Party: National Party
- Spouse: Signe Söderström (m. 1891; died 1934)
- Children: 3
- Education: Uppsala University
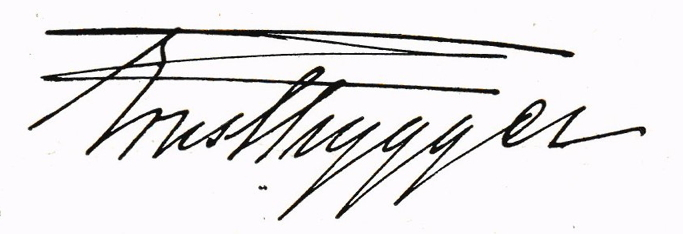
- Signature

Ernst Trygger (27 October 1857 – 23 September 1943) was a Swedish conservative statesman, diplomat, and jurist who served as Prime Minister of Sweden from 1923 to 1924. He was leader of the National Party from 1913 to 1933 and represented Kopparberg and Stockholm in the Riksdag from 1898 to 1937. An influential figure in Swedish conservatism and politics during the 20th century, he was known for his advocacy of constitutional order, strong executive authority, and cautious attitude toward democratic reform.

== Biography ==
Ernst Trygger was born on the island of Skeppsholmen in Stockholm, the Swedish capital. His father was military officer Alfred Trygger. Young Ernst made an astonishing career at Uppsala University, where he became Professor of Law in 1889.

In 1891, Ernst Trygger married Signe Söderström, with whom he went on to have three children. In 1914 they had a large private villa built in Diplomatstaden, Stockholm, now home to the Swedish Bar Association.

After being elected into the first chamber of the Riksdag, Trygger gained a reputation as a good debater with deeply conservative values. He was a member of the committee of 1895-98 that was formed to revise the terms of the union with Norway. In 1909, Trygger became leader of a conservative group in the first chamber. When the rightist wings joined together in 1913 to form the National party of the first chamber, Trygger became the leader of a united rightist force in Swedish politics and as such he opposed the new influences of democracy and parliamentarism in the 1910s. His rival as conservative leader was Arvid Lindman, the main character in the more moderately conservative rightist party of the second chamber of the Parliament of Sweden.

At the time of king Gustav V's last power demonstration during the "Courtyard Crisis" of 1914, Ernst Trygger was secretly a royal advisor. However, after the constitutional reforms leading to equal suffrage, (first applied in 1921) Trygger accepted the new, more democratic, political landscape.

== Prime minister ==
When the cabinet of Hjalmar Branting, the world's first social democrat to be voted into power, resigned in 1923, king Gustav authorized (one of few remainders of real power still in royal hands) Trygger to head the government. Trygger had had a chance to reach this position already in 1920, but this was prevented by Lindman, who rather saw an unpolitical government before an upcoming election.

The major issue during Trygger's time in office was the question of defence and alignment. Leader of a minority cabinet, Trygger tried to reach a solution with broad acceptance through "intelligent adjustment" ("intelligent anpassning"). This failed due to lack of support from both the social democrats and the liberals. In the 1924 elections the support of the Right increased, nonetheless it was Branting who got to form cabinet, after even bigger electoral gains for the social democrats. Another reason in Branting's favour was the likelihood of a solution to the defence issue supported by both liberals and social democrats.

The confidence in Trygger's cabinet regarding international issues had also been somewhat damaged after an incident in the autumn of 1923. The Minister for Foreign Affairs, Carl Hederstierna, had openly during a speech before leading Swedish journalists declared his support for an defence alliance with Finland in the event of any Russo-Finnish dispute. This damaged Russo-Swedish relations at a sensitive point, when trade negotiations were about to be opened and fundamentally opposed the tacit principle of Swedish non-alignment. Hederstierna was swiftly replaced with count Erik Marks von Würtemberg.

== Later life ==
After having served as Minister for Foreign Affairs in the cabinet of Lindman 1928–30, Trygger cut down on his political involvement and concentrated on his academic commissions. He renewed the education of Law at Uppsala university and was known as a brilliant lecturer.

Ernst Trygger died in 1943, at the age of 85, from complications after having broken his leg.

Preceded by Hjalmar Branting	Prime Minister of Sweden; 1923–1924	Succeeded by Hjalmar Branting
Preceded by Eliel Löfgren	Swedish Minister for Foreign Affairs; 1928–1930	Succeeded by Fredrik Ramel
