= Sten Andersson =

Swedish politician (1923–2006)

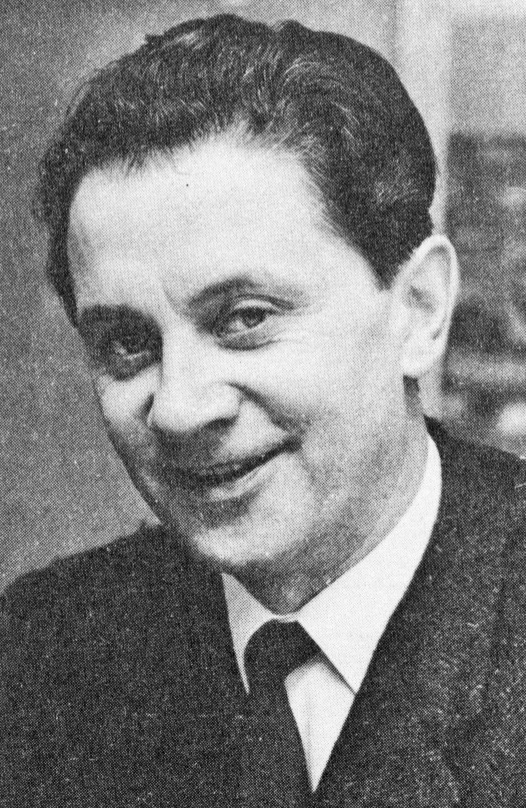
- Sten Andersson in 1970

President of the Nordic Council
- In office 1 January 1994 – 1 October 1994
- Preceded by: Jan P. Syse
- Succeeded by: Per Olof Håkansson

Minister for Foreign Affairs
- In office 17 October 1985 – 4 October 1991
- Prime Minister: Olof Palme; Ingvar Carlsson
- Preceded by: Lennart Bodström
- Succeeded by: Margaretha af Ugglas

Minister for Social Affairs
- In office 8 October 1982 – 17 October 1985
- Prime Minister: Olof Palme
- Preceded by: Karin Söder
- Succeeded by: Gertrud Sigurdsen

Party Secretary of the Swedish Social Democratic Party
- In office 1962 – 8 October 1982
- Leader: Tage Erlander; Olof Palme
- Preceded by: Sven Aspling
- Succeeded by: Bo Toresson

Personal details
- Born: Sten Sture Andersson; 20 April 1923 Stockholm, Sweden
- Died: 16 September 2006 (aged 83) Haninge, Sweden
- Party: Swedish Social Democratic Party
- Spouse(s): Eivor Atling (m. 1950; died 1970) Britta Holmberg (m. 1974)
- Children: 6

Sten Sture Andersson (20 April 1923 – 16 September 2006) was a Swedish Social Democratic politician. He served as Minister for Social Affairs from 1982 to 1985 and as Minister for Foreign Affairs from 1985 to 1991. He was also President of the Nordic Council in 1994.

== Biography ==
Andersson was born into a working-class family in the Södermalm district of Stockholm. When he was two-three years old, his carpenter-working father took the opportunity to build a house in Enskede for his family, a house where Sten would live for most of his whole life. He started working as a mailman in 1940 while attending evening gymnasium courses, and received his students' degree in 1944. Andersson then began studying economics and political science at Stockholm University College, but did not graduate. In 1942 Andersson joined the Swedish Social Democratic Youth League, of which he chaired the local chapter from 1945 to 1948. He was elected a member of the Stockholm city council from 1951 to 1962. From 1953 he worked for the Stockholm labour commune, first as an ombudsman, and then served as its secretary from 1958 to 1962.

Andersson was party secretary of the Social Democratic Party from 1962 until 1982, and a member of the Riksdag from 1966 to 1994 (of the First Chamber until 1970). Between 1982 and 1985 he was Minister of Social Affairs, and between 1985 and 1991 Minister of Foreign Affairs. As Foreign Minister, Andersson worked strongly for peace in the Israeli–Palestinian conflict, and took initiatives for dialogue between Israel and the Palestine Liberation Organization. After his ministerial career ended, he served as President of the Nordic Council in 1994 and as Chairman of the Olof Palme International Center until 1999. His memoirs were published in 1993.

=== Personal life ===
Andersson was married twice, first to Eivor Atling (1930–1970) in 1950. After her death in 1970, he married Britta Holmberg (1941–). He had three children with Atling, and three with Holmberg. Andersson died from a heart attack in 2006.

== Honours and awards ==
=== National honours and awards ===
- Illis quorum, 1995

=== Foreign honours and awards ===
- (Portugal) Grand Cross of the Order of Prince Henry, 13 January 1987
- (Italy) Knight Grand Cross of the Order of Merit of the Italian Republic, 8 April 1991
- (Palestine) Star of Jerusalem of the Order of Jerusalem, 2010 (posthumously)

Government offices
Preceded by Lennart Bodström	Swedish Minister for Foreign Affairs; 1985–1991	Succeeded by Margaretha af Ugglas
