= Torsten Nilsson =

Swedish politician (1905–1997)

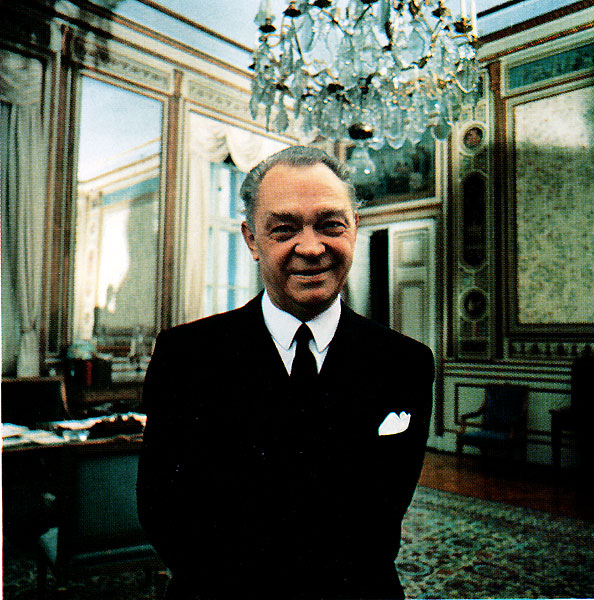
- Torsten Nilsson, ca 1966

Minister for Foreign Affairs
- In office 19 September 1962 – 30 June 1971
- Prime Minister: Tage Erlander; Olof Palme
- Preceded by: Östen Undén
- Succeeded by: Krister Wickman

Minister for Social Affairs
- In office 22 March 1957 – 19 September 1962
- Prime Minister: Tage Erlander
- Preceded by: John Ericsson
- Succeeded by: Sven Aspling

Minister for Defence
- In office 1 October 1951 – 22 March 1957
- Prime Minister: Tage Erlander
- Preceded by: Allan Vougt
- Succeeded by: Sven Andersson

Minister of Communications (Transport)
- In office 31 July 1945 – 1 October 1951
- Prime Minister: Per Albin Hansson; Tage Erlander
- Preceded by: Fritiof Domö
- Succeeded by: Sven Andersson

Personal details
- Born: Harald Torsten Leonard Nilsson; 1 April 1905 Nevishög, Sweden
- Died: 14 December 1997 (aged 92) Stockholm, Sweden
- Party: Social Democratic Party
- Spouse: Vera Månsson (m. 1935)
- Children: 2
- Profession: Politician

Harald Torsten Leonard Nilsson (1 April 1905 – 14 December 1997) was a Swedish Social Democratic politician. He served as minister for defence from 1951 to 1957, and as minister for foreign affairs from 1962 to 1971. Nilsson also served as minister for social affairs and minister of communications.

== Early life ==
Nilsson was born on 1 April 1905, in Nevishög, Malmöhus County, Sweden, the son of Lars Nilsson, a bricklayer, and his wife Hilda (née Persson). He completed his secondary education (realexamen) and went on to attend vocational school and a folk high school in Germany. From 1922 to 1929, he worked as a bricklayer. He served as secretary of the Social Democratic Youth District of Scania from 1927 to 1930, and as its chairman from 1930 to 1934. That same year, he joined the Swedish Social Democratic Youth League (SSU). Between 1930 and 1934, he also worked as a journalist for the newspaper Arbetet in Malmö, and from 1937 to 1940, he was the editor of the SSU magazine Frihet. In 1939, Nilsson was appointed chairman of the International Union of Socialist Youth.

== Career ==
Nilsson served as party secretary from 1940 to 1948 and was chairman of the Stockholm Labour Union from 1945 to 1975. He was a member of parliament from 1941 to 1976 (in the Second Chamber until 1970) and held continuous cabinet positions from 1945 to 1971. From 1945 to 1951, he served as minister of communications, then as minister for defence from 1951 to 1957, and as minister for social affairs from 1957 to 1962. His final ministerial role was as minister for foreign affairs from 1962 to 1971. In the 1970s and 1980s, he published several memoirs reflecting on his years in politics. In the 1970s and 1980s, he wrote several memoirs about his years in politics.

== Personal life ==
From 1935, Nilsson was married to Vera Månsson (1906–2002). They had two children: Lars (born 1941) and Kristina (born 1948).

== Death ==
Nilsson died on 14 December 1997 in Stockholm, Sweden. He was interred on 30 January 1998 at Skogskyrkogården in southern Stockholm.

== In popular culture ==
Swedish multimedia artist Öyvind Fahlström wrote a radio play called Den helige Torsten Nilsson ("The holy Torsten Nilsson"), first broadcast by Sveriges Radio in 1966 and published as a book by Bonniers in 1968. The play, which combines the technique of collage in visual arts with concrete poetry and sound art, intervenes in the contemporary political landscape in Sweden at the time, and names of real people are part of the story.

== Awards and honours ==
- (Sweden) Illis quorum, 18th size (1984)
- Honorary member of the Royal Swedish Society of Naval Sciences, 1956

Government offices
Preceded by Fritiof Domö	Minister of Communications; 1945–1951	Succeeded by Sven Andersson
Preceded by Allan Vougt	Minister for Defence; 1951–1957	Succeeded by Sven Andersson
Preceded by John Ericsson	Minister for Social Affairs; 1957–1962	Succeeded by Sven Aspling
Preceded by Östen Undén	Minister for Foreign Affairs; 1962–1971	Succeeded by Krister Wickman
