= Valbo =

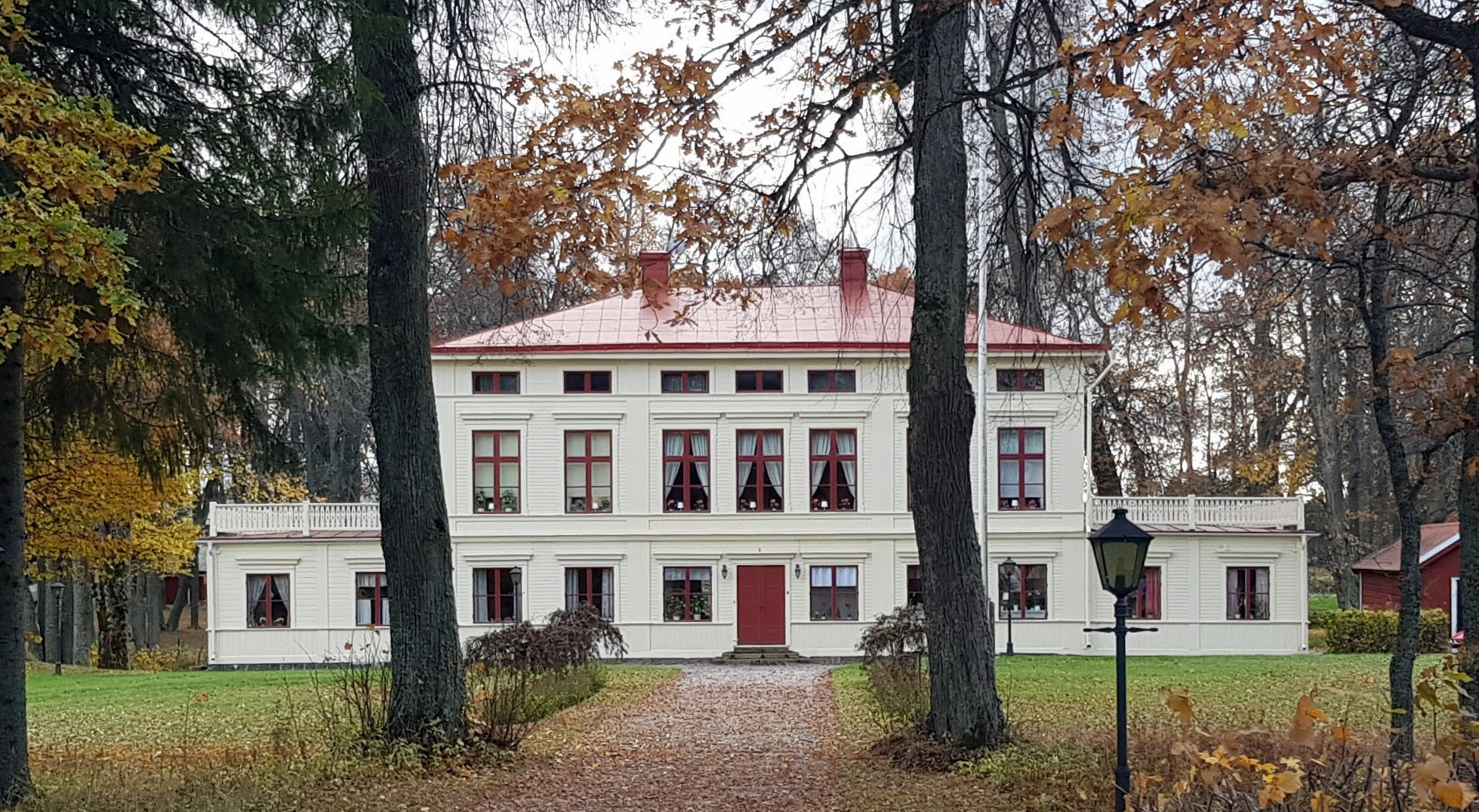
- Åby Farm, Valbo

- Coat of arms

- Location within Sweden Gävleborg Location within Sweden
- Coordinates: 60°39′N 17°02′E
- Country: Sweden
- Province: Gästrikland
- County: Gävleborg County
- Municipality: Gävle Municipality

Area
  - Total: 8.24 km^{2} (3.18 sq mi)

Population (31 December 2010)
  - Total: 7,065
  - Density: 858/km^{2} (2,220/sq mi)
- Time zone: UTC+1 (CET)
  - Summer (DST): UTC+2 (CEST)

Valbo is a locality situated in Gävle Municipality, Gävleborg County, Sweden with 7,065 inhabitants in 2010. It is situated south-west of Gävle itself and could be considered a suburb of the city.

Valbo is known for the large shopping mall Valbo köpcentrum and for being the birthplace of Stanley Cup champion Nicklas Bäckström.

== Valbo parish ==
Coat of arms.

Valbo is also a parish within the Church of Sweden, which has 11,600 members in the town and surrounding area in the eastern part of Gävle Municipality.

== Education ==
- Sofiedalskolan (Sofiedal School) Is an upper (senior) level of compulsory school and it is located in the central parts of Valbo and it has around 550 students, The school also has an intermediate level and also the first three years of compulsory school for students.
- Ludvigsbergsskolan (Ludvigsberg School) is located in the central parts of Valbo and it has the first three years of compulsory school for students and also an intermediate level. The school has around 400 students.
- Alborga skola (Alborga School) is located in the north of Valbo and it has the first three years of compulsory school for students with about 100 students

Häcklingeskolan (Häcklinge School) was closed in 2005 and the students were transferred to the Sofiedal school

== Sports ==
The following sports clubs are located in Valbo:

- Valbo FF
- Valbo AIF
- Valbo IBF
- Valbo HC

== Notable people ==
- Nicklas Bäckström – hockey player and Stanley Cup champion
- Andreas Dackell – hockey player
- Christian Lundeberg – Prime Minister of Sweden
- Gösta Netzén – journalist and politician
- Theodor Svedberg – chemist and Nobel laureate
