= Minister for Foreign Affairs (Sweden) =

Swedish cabinet position

Minister for Foreign Affairs of Sweden
- Statsråd och chef för utrikesdepartementet
- Lesser coat of arms of Sweden

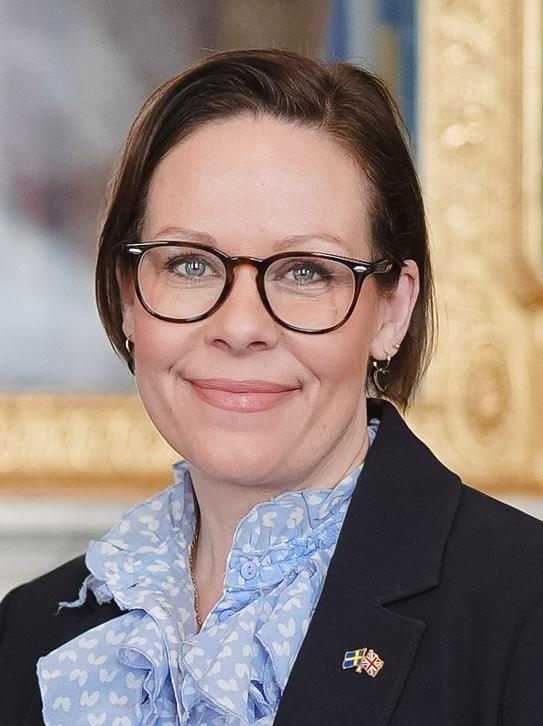
- Incumbent; Maria Malmer Stenergard since 10 September 2024
- Ministry for Foreign Affairs
- Style: Excellency was used up to the 1970s in Sweden; but is still used in diplomatic writing
- Member of: Government of Sweden; National Security Council
- Seat: Arvfurstens palats, Stockholm, Sweden
- Appointer: The Prime Minister
- Term length: No fixed term; Serves as long as the Prime Minister sees fit
- Formation: 6 June 1809 (as Prime Minister of Foreign Affairs); 20 March 1876 (as Minister for Foreign Affairs); 6 June 1974 (as Councilor of State and Head of the Foreign Department)
- First holder: Oscar Björnstjerna
- Deputy: State Secretary for Foreign Affairs
- Website: www.sweden.gov.se

The Minister for Foreign Affairs (Swedish: utrikesminister) is the foreign minister of Sweden and the head of the Ministry for Foreign Affairs.

The current Minister for Foreign Affairs is Maria Malmer Stenergard of the Moderate Party.

== History ==
The office was instituted in 1809 as a result of the constitutional Instrument of Government promulgated in the same year. Until 1876 the office was called Prime Minister for Foreign Affairs (Swedish: statsminister för utrikes ärendena, commonly known as utrikesstatsminister), similar to the office of Prime Minister for Justice (Swedish: justitiestatsminister). The Prime Minister for Foreign Affairs initially served as head of the Cabinet of Foreign Mail Exchange at the Royal Office. Following the ministry reform in 1840, the Prime Minister for Foreign Affairs became head of the newly instituted Ministry for Foreign Affairs. In 1876 the office proper of Prime Minister of Sweden was created and at the same time the Prime Minister for Foreign Affairs was nominally demoted to a mere Minister. The holder of the office did however continue to be styled as "Your excellency", until 1974 when the new Instrument of Government came into force. Before the parliamentary breakthrough in the early 20th century, that title had been granted exclusively to members of the most prominent noble families.

== Office holders ==
=== Prime Ministers for Foreign Affairs (1809–1876) ===
Portrait	Name	Took office	Left office	Political party
	Lars von Engeström	9 June 1809	8 June 1824	Independent
	Gustaf af Wetterstedt	8 June 1824	15 May 1837	Independent
	Adolf Mörner (acting)	15 May 1837	30 January 1838	Independent
	Gustaf Algernon Stierneld	30 January 1838	11 July 1842	Independent
	Albrecht Elof Ihre (acting)	5 September 1840	29 December 1842	Independent
	Albrecht Elof Ihre	29 December 1842	10 April 1848	Independent
	Gustaf Algernon Stierneld	10 April 1848	8 September 1856	Independent
	Elias Lagerheim	8 September 1856	16 March 1858	Independent
	Ludvig Manderström	16 March 1858	4 June 1868	Independent
	Carl Wachtmeister	4 June 1868	14 October 1871	Independent
	Baltzar von Platen	10 November 1871	17 December 1872	Independent
	Oscar Björnstjerna	17 December 1872	20 March 1876	Independent

=== Ministers for Foreign Affairs (1876–present) ===
Parties

No party
Lantmanna Party
Social Democrat
Conservative / Moderate Party
Liberal / People's Party
Centre Party

Status

Denotes acting Minister for Foreign Affairs

No.	Portrait	Minister (Born–Died)	Tenure			Political party	Cabinet
No.	Portrait	Minister (Born–Died)	Took office	Left office	Duration	Political party	Cabinet
1		Oscar Björnstjerna (1819–1905)	20 March 1876	19 April 1880	4 years, 30 days	Independent	De Geer Sr. (II)
2		Carl Hochschild (1831–1898)	27 April 1880	25 September 1885	5 years, 151 days	Independent	Posse
2		Carl Hochschild (1831–1898)	27 April 1880	25 September 1885	5 years, 151 days	Independent	Thyselius
3		Albert Ehrensvärd the Elder (1821–1901)	25 September 1885	12 June 1889	3 years, 260 days	Independent	Themptander
3		Albert Ehrensvärd the Elder (1821–1901)	25 September 1885	12 June 1889	3 years, 260 days	Independent	Gillis Bildt
4		Gustaf Åkerhielm (1833–1900)	12 June 1889	12 October 1889	122 days	Protectionist Party	Gillis Bildt
5		Carl Lewenhaupt (1835–1906)	12 October 1889	1 June 1895	5 years, 232 days	Independent	Åkerhielm
5		Carl Lewenhaupt (1835–1906)	12 October 1889	1 June 1895	5 years, 232 days	Independent	Boström (I)
6		Ludvig Douglas (1849–1916)	1 June 1895	13 October 1899	4 years, 134 days	Independent	Boström (I)
7		Alfred Lagerheim (1843–1924)	20 December 1899	7 December 1904	4 years, 353 days	Lantmanna Party	von Otter
7		Alfred Lagerheim (1843–1924)	20 December 1899	7 December 1904	4 years, 353 days	Lantmanna Party	Boström (II)
8		August Gyldenstolpe (1849–1928)	22 December 1904	2 August 1905	223 days	Independent	Ramstedt
9		Fredrik Wachtmeister (1855–1919)	2 August 1905	7 November 1905	97 days	Protectionist Party	Lundeberg
10		Eric Trolle (1863–1934)	7 November 1905	17 March 1909	3 years, 130 days	Independent	Staaff (I)
10		Eric Trolle (1863–1934)	7 November 1905	17 March 1909	3 years, 130 days	Independent	Lindman (I)
11		Arvid Taube (1853–1916)	30 April 1909	7 October 1911	2 years, 160 days	General Electoral League	Lindman (I)
12		Albert Ehrensvärd the Younger (1867–1940)	7 October 1911	17 February 1914	2 years, 133 days	Liberal Coalition Party	Staaff (I)
13		Knut Wallenberg (1853–1938)	17 February 1914	30 March 1917	3 years, 41 days	National Party	Hammarskjöld
14		Arvid Lindman (1862–1936)	30 March 1917	19 October 1917	203 days	General Electoral League	Swartz
15		Johannes Hellner (1866–1947)	19 October 1917	10 March 1920	2 years, 143 days	Liberal Coalition Party	Edén
16		Erik Palmstierna (1877–1959)	10 March 1920	27 October 1920	231 days	Social Democrats	Branting (I)
17		Herman Wrangel (1857–1934)	27 October 1920	13 October 1921	351 days	Independent	De Geer Jr.
17		Herman Wrangel (1857–1934)	27 October 1920	13 October 1921	351 days	Independent	von Sydow
18		Hjalmar Branting (1860–1925)	13 October 1921	19 April 1923	1 year, 188 days	Social Democrats	Branting (II)
19		Carl Hederstierna (1861–1928)	19 April 1923	11 November 1923	206 days	General Electoral League	Trygger
20		Erik Marks von Würtemberg (1861–1937)	11 November 1923	18 October 1924	342 days	General Electoral League	Trygger
21		Östen Undén (1886–1974)	18 October 1924	7 June 1926	1 year, 232 days	Social Democrats	Branting (III)
21		Östen Undén (1886–1974)	18 October 1924	7 June 1926	1 year, 232 days	Social Democrats	Sandler
22		Eliel Löfgren (1872–1940)	7 June 1926	2 October 1928	2 years, 117 days	Liberal Party	Ekman (I)
23		Ernst Trygger (1857–1943)	2 October 1928	7 June 1930	1 year, 248 days	National Party	Lindman (II)
24		Fredrik Ramel (1872–1947)	7 June 1930	24 September 1932	2 years, 109 days	Independent	Ekman (II)
24		Fredrik Ramel (1872–1947)	7 June 1930	24 September 1932	2 years, 109 days	Independent	Hamrin
25		Rickard Sandler (1884–1964)	24 September 1932	19 June 1936	3 years, 269 days	Social Democrats	Hansson (I)
26		Karl Gustaf Westman (1876–1944)	19 June 1936	28 September 1936	101 days	Farmer's League	Pehrsson-Bramstorp
27		Rickard Sandler (1884–1964)	28 September 1936	13 December 1939	3 years, 76 days	Social Democrats	Hansson (II)
28		Christian Günther (1886–1966)	13 December 1939	31 July 1945	5 years, 230 days	Independent	Hansson (III)
29		Östen Undén (1886–1974)	31 July 1945	19 September 1962	17 years, 50 days	Social Democrats	Hansson (IV)
29		Östen Undén (1886–1974)	31 July 1945	19 September 1962	17 years, 50 days	Social Democrats	Erlander (I)
29		Östen Undén (1886–1974)	31 July 1945	19 September 1962	17 years, 50 days	Social Democrats	Erlander (II)
29		Östen Undén (1886–1974)	31 July 1945	19 September 1962	17 years, 50 days	Social Democrats	Erlander (III)
30		Torsten Nilsson (1905–1997)	19 September 1962	30 June 1971	8 years, 284 days	Social Democrats	Erlander (III)
30		Torsten Nilsson (1905–1997)	19 September 1962	30 June 1971	8 years, 284 days	Social Democrats	Palme (I)
31		Krister Wickman (1924–1993)	30 June 1971	3 November 1973	2 years, 126 days	Social Democrats	Palme (I)
32		Sven Andersson (1910–1987)	3 November 1973	8 October 1976	2 years, 340 days	Social Democrats	Palme (I)
33		Karin Söder (1928–2015)	8 October 1976	18 October 1978	2 years, 10 days	Centre Party	Fälldin (I)
34		Hans Blix (born 1928)	18 October 1978	12 October 1979	359 days	People's Party	Ullsten
35		Ola Ullsten (1931–2018)	12 October 1979	8 October 1982	2 years, 361 days	People's Party	Fälldin (II)
35		Ola Ullsten (1931–2018)	12 October 1979	8 October 1982	2 years, 361 days	People's Party	Fälldin (III)
36		Lennart Bodström (1928–2015)	8 October 1982	17 October 1985	3 years, 9 days	Social Democrats	Palme (II)
37		Sten Andersson (1923–2006)	17 October 1985	4 October 1991	5 years, 352 days	Social Democrats	Palme (II)
37		Sten Andersson (1923–2006)	17 October 1985	4 October 1991	5 years, 352 days	Social Democrats	Carlsson (I)
37		Sten Andersson (1923–2006)	17 October 1985	4 October 1991	5 years, 352 days	Social Democrats	Carlsson (II)
38		Margaretha af Ugglas (1939–2026)	4 October 1991	7 October 1994	3 years, 3 days	Moderate Party	Carl Bildt
39		Lena Hjelm-Wallén (born 1943)	7 October 1994	7 October 1998	4 years, 0 days	Social Democrats	Carlsson (III)
39		Lena Hjelm-Wallén (born 1943)	7 October 1994	7 October 1998	4 years, 0 days	Social Democrats	Persson
40		Anna Lindh (1957–2003)	7 October 1998	11 September 2003	4 years, 339 days	Social Democrats	Persson
–		Jan O. Karlsson (1939–2016)	11 September 2003	10 October 2003	29 days	Social Democrats	Persson
41		Laila Freivalds (born 1942)	10 October 2003	21 March 2006	2 years, 162 days	Social Democrats	Persson
–		Bo Ringholm (born 1942)	21 March 2006	27 March 2006	6 days	Social Democrats	Persson
–		Carin Jämtin (born 1964)	27 March 2006	24 April 2006	28 days	Social Democrats	Persson
42		Jan Eliasson (born 1940)	24 April 2006	6 October 2006	165 days	Social Democrats	Persson
43		Carl Bildt (born 1949)	6 October 2006	3 October 2014	7 years, 362 days	Moderate Party	Reinfeldt
44		Margot Wallström (born 1954)	3 October 2014	10 September 2019	4 years, 342 days	Social Democrats	Löfven (I)
44		Margot Wallström (born 1954)	3 October 2014	10 September 2019	4 years, 342 days	Social Democrats	Löfven (II)
45		Ann Linde (born 1961)	10 September 2019	18 October 2022	3 years, 38 days	Social Democrats	Löfven (II) · (III); Andersson
46		Tobias Billström (born 1973)	18 October 2022	10 September 2024	1 year, 328 days	Moderate Party	Kristersson
47		Maria Malmer Stenergard (born 1981)	10 September 2024	Incumbent	2 years, 65 days	Moderate Party	Kristersson

==== Statistics ====
#	Minister for Foreign Affairs	Date of birth	Age at ascension (first term)	Time in office (total)	Age at retirement (last term)	Date of death	Longevity
1	Oscar Björnstjerna	6 March 1819	57 years, 14 days	4 years, 30 days	61 years, 44 days	2 September 1905	86 years, 180 days
2	Carl Hochschild	13 September 1831	48 years, 227 days	5 years, 151 days	54 years, 12 days	12 December 1898	67 years, 90 days
3	Albert Ehrensvärd, Sr.	10 January 1821	64 years, 258 days	3 years, 260 days	68 years, 153 days	31 January 1901	80 years, 21 days
4	Gustaf Åkerhielm	24 June 1833	55 years, 353 days	0 years, 122 days	56 years, 110 days	2 April 1900	66 years, 282 days
5	Carl Lewenhaupt	19 March 1835	54 years, 207 days	5 years, 232 days	60 years, 74 days	10 December 1906	71 years, 266 days
6	Ludvig Douglas	24 November 1849	45 years, 189 days	4 years, 134 days	49 years, 323 days	20 July 1916	66 years, 239 days
7	Alfred Lagerheim	4 October 1843	56 years, 77 days	4 years, 353 days	61 years, 64 days	23 May 1924	80 years, 232 days
8	August Gyldenstolpe	22 July 1849	55 years, 153 days	0 years, 223 days	56 years, 11 days	30 June 1928	78 years, 344 days
9	Fredrik Wachtmeister	10 February 1855	50 years, 173 days	0 years, 97 days	50 years, 270 days	6 September 1919	64 years, 208 days
10	Eric Trolle	23 September 1863	41 years, 349 days	3 years, 130 days	45 years, 114 days	21 April 1934	70 years, 149 days
11	Arvid Taube	19 January 1853	56 years, 101 days	2 years, 160 days	58 years, 261 days	14 October 1916	63 years, 269 days
12	Albert Ehrensvärd, Jr.	9 May 1867	44 years, 151 days	2 years, 133 days	46 years, 284 days	6 March 1940	72 years, 302 days
13	Knut Wallenberg	19 May 1853	60 years, 274 days	3 years, 41 days	63 years, 315 days	1 June 1938	85 years, 13 days
14	Arvid Lindman	19 September 1862	46 years, 55 days	0 years, 203 days	48 years, 198 days	9 December 1936	74 years, 81 days
15	Johannes Hellner	22 April 1866	51 years, 180 days	2 years, 143 days	53 years, 323 days	19 February 1947	80 years, 303 days
16	Erik Palmstierna	10 November 1877	42 years, 121 days	0 years, 231 days	42 years, 352 days	22 October 1959	81 years, 346 days
17	Herman Wrangel	13 August 1857	63 years, 75 days	0 years, 351 days	64 years, 61 days	9 October 1934	77 years, 57 days
18	Hjalmar Branting	23 November 1860	60 years, 324 days	1 year, 188 days	62 years, 147 days	24 February 1925	64 years, 93 days
19	Carl Hederstierna	1 December 1861	61 years, 139 days	0 years, 206 days	61 years, 345 days	17 November 1928	66 years, 352 days
20	Erik Marks von Würtemberg	11 May 1861	62 years, 184 days	0 years, 342 days	63 years, 160 days	22 July 1937	76 years, 72 days
21	Östen Undén	25 August 1886	38 years, 54 days	18 years, 282 days	76 years, 25 days	14 January 1974	87 years, 142 days
22	Eliel Löfgren	15 March 1872	54 years, 84 days	2 years, 117 days	56 years, 201 days	8 April 1940	68 years, 24 days
23	Ernst Trygger	27 October 1857	70 years, 341 days	1 years, 248 days	72 years, 223 days	23 September 1943	85 years, 331 days
24	Fredrik Ramel	9 December 1872	57 years, 180 days	2 years, 109 days	59 years, 290 days	30 October 1947	74 years, 325 days
25	Rickard Sandler	29 January 1884	48 years, 239 days	6 years, 345 days	55 years, 318 days	12 November 1964	80 years, 288 days
26	Karl Gustaf Westman	18 August 1876	59 years, 306 days	0 years, 101 days	60 years, 41 days	24 January 1944	67 years, 159 days
27	Christian Günther	5 December 1886	53 years, 8 days	5 years, 230 days	58 years, 238 days	6 March 1966	79 years, 91 days
28	Torsten Nilsson	1 April 1905	57 years, 171 days	8 years, 284 days	66 years, 90 days	14 December 1997	92 years, 257 days
29	Krister Wickman	13 April 1924	47 years, 78 days	2 years, 126 days	49 years, 204 days	10 September 1993	69 years, 150 days
30	Sven Andersson	5 April 1910	63 years, 212 days	2 years, 340 days	66 years, 186 days	21 September 1987	77 years, 169 days
31	Karin Söder	30 November 1928	47 years, 313 days	2 years, 10 days	49 years, 322 days	19 December 2015	87 years, 19 days
32	Hans Blix	28 June 1928	50 years, 112 days	0 years, 359 days	51 years, 106 days	Living	98 years, 139 days (Living)
33	Ola Ullsten	23 June 1931	48 years, 111 days	2 years, 361 days	51 years, 107 days	28 May 2018	86 years, 339 days
34	Lennart Bodström	20 April 1928	54 years, 171 days	3 years, 9 days	57 years, 180 days	30 April 2015	87 years, 10 days
35	Sten Andersson	20 April 1923	62 years, 180 days	5 years, 352 days	68 years, 167 days	13 September 2006	83 years, 210 days
36	Margaretha af Ugglas	5 January 1939	52 years, 272 days	3 years, 3 days	55 years, 275 days	Living	87 years, 313 days (Living)
37	Lena Hjelm-Wallén	14 January 1943	51 years, 266 days	4 years, 0 days	55 years, 266 days	Living	83 years, 304 days (Living)
38	Anna Lindh	19 June 1957	41 years, 110 days	4 years, 339 days	46 years, 84 days	11 September 2003	46 years, 84 days
39	Laila Freivalds	22 June 1942	61 years, 110 days	2 years, 162 days	63 years, 272 days	Living	84 years, 145 days (Living)
40	Jan Eliasson	17 September 1940	65 years, 219 days	0 years, 165 days	66 years, 19 days	Living	86 years, 58 days (Living)
41	Carl Bildt	15 July 1949	57 years, 83 days	7 years, 362 days	65 years, 80 days	Living	77 years, 122 days (Living)
42	Margot Wallström	28 September 1954	60 years, 5 days	4 years, 342 days	64 years, 347 days	Living	72 years, 47 days (Living)
43	Ann Linde	4 December 1961	57 years, 280 days	3 years, 38 days	60 years, 318 days	Living	64 years, 345 days (Living)
44	Tobias Billström	27 December 1973	48 years, 295 days	1 years, 328 days	50 years, 258 days	Living	52 years, 322 days (Living)
45	Maria Malmer Stenergard	23 March 1981	43 years, 171 days	2 years, 65 days (Ongoing)	Incumbent	Living	45 years, 236 days (Living)

== See also ==
- State Secretary for Foreign Affairs (Sweden)
