= Erik Marks von Würtemberg =

Swedish jurist and politician

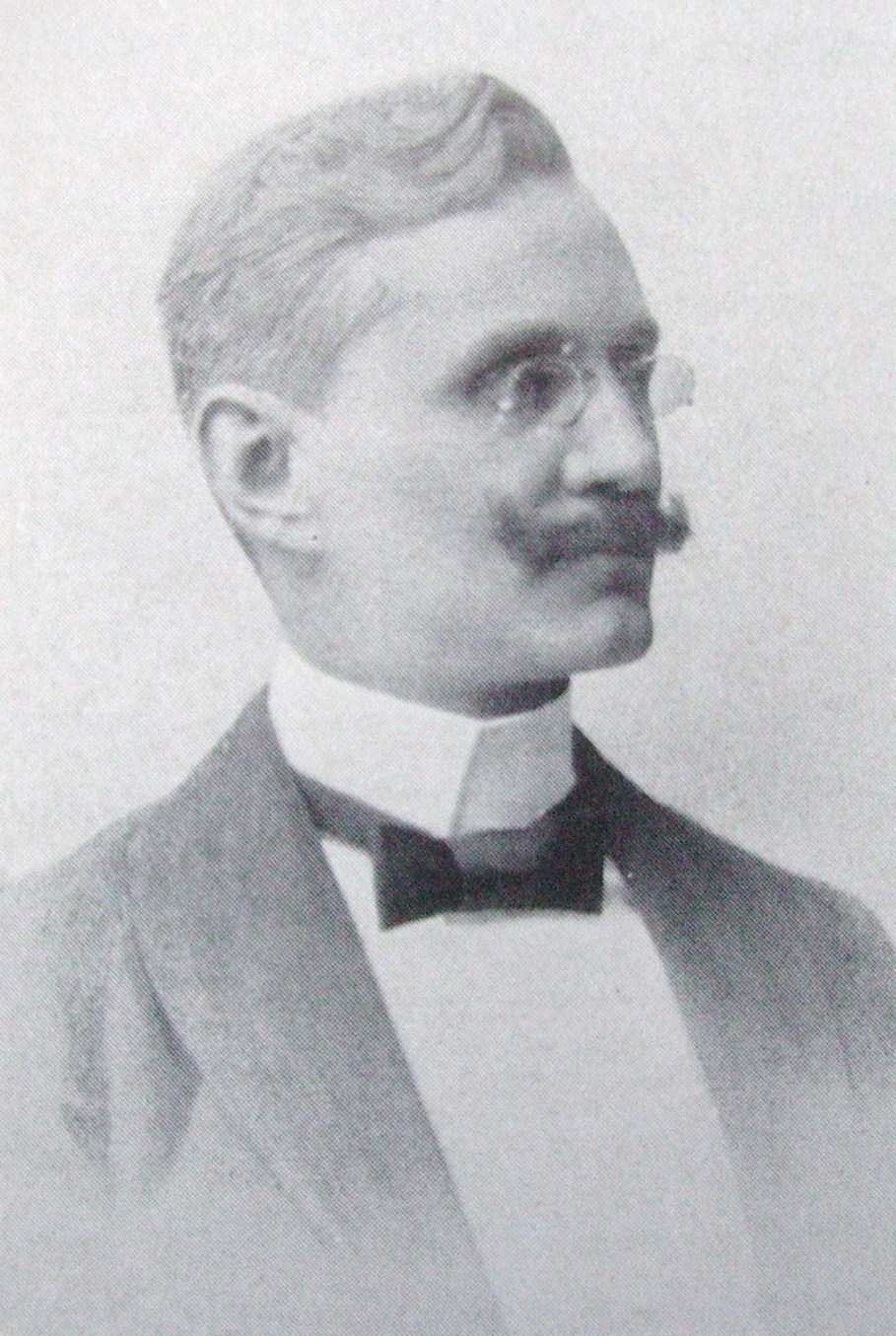

Foreign Minister of Sweden
- In office 11 November 1923 – 18 October 1924

Justice of the Supreme Court of Sweden
- In office 1903–1920

President of the Svea Court of Appeal
- In office 1920–1931

Baron Erik Teodor Marks von Würtemberg (1861, Björnlunda – 1937) was a Swedish jurist and politician. He served as Foreign Minister of Sweden 1923–1924 in the government of Ernst Trygger, representing the General Electoral Union. During his tenure, Sweden recognised the Soviet Union.

He was a Justice of the Supreme Court of Sweden (Högsta domstolen) 1903–1920 and President of the Svea Court of Appeal (Svea hovrätt) 1920–1931. He represented Sweden at the Paris Peace Conference in 1919 as well as at the Rome Conference of 1928 to revise the Berne Convention. From 1920 to 1929, he represented his home country in the League of Nations. He was subsequently a member of the Permanent Court of Arbitration in The Hague.

== Honours ==
=== Swedish honours ===
- Knight of the Royal Order of the Seraphim, 6 June 1926.
- Commander Grand Cross of the Royal Order of the Polar Star, 6 June 1913.
- Commander 1st Class of the Royal Order of the Polar Star, 15 May 1905.
- Commander of the Royal Order of the Polar Star, 30 November 1901.
- Knight of the Royal Order of the Polar Star, 1 December 1898.

=== Foreign honours ===
- Grand Cross of the Order of the Dannebrog. 26 January 1921.
- Grand Cross of the Order of the White Rose of Finland, 1925.
- Grand Officer of the Legion of Honour, 1922.
- Grand Cross of the Order of St. Olav, 13 October 1919.
- Commander 1st Class of the Order of St. Olav, 22 October 1904.

Political offices
| Preceded by Carl Hederstierna | Swedish Minister for Foreign Affairs; 1923–1924 | Succeeded by Östen Undén |
