= Aktuellt i Politiken =

Weekly social democrat political magazine in Sweden

- Categories: Political magazine
- Frequency: Weekly
- Founded: 1953
- Company: AiP Media Produktion AB
- Country: Sweden
- Based in: Stockholm
- Language: Swedish
- Website: AiP
- ISSN: 0002-3884
- OCLC: 185269511

Aktuellt i Politiken (Swedish: Current Issues in Politics; abbreviated as AiP) is a Swedish language political and news publication which is one of the media outlets of the Social Democratic Party. It has been in circulation since 1953.

== History and profile ==
AiP was established by Sven Aspling in 1953 with the title Aktuellt i Politik och Samhälle. It has been a part of AiP Media Produktion AB since 1999, a publishing company owned by the Swedish Social Democratic Party.

Until 1992, AiP published 20 issues per year. Then the frequency was switched to weekly. The paper contains news, reports, analyses and comments. Bo Södersten, an economist, published an article in the magazine in 1988 while serving at the Parliament for the Swedish Social Democratic Party in which he criticized the party due to its centralized structure. It also features film reviews one of which was about Ingmar Bergman's From the Life of the Marionettes.

The editors-in-chief of AiP include Åke Fors, Sven Dahlin, Macke Nilsson, Nils Hillén, Enn Kokk, Håkan Quisth, Peter Hultqvist, Ove Andersson, Eric Sundström, Jan Söderström and Fredrik Kornebäck. Since July 2019, Maria Persson has been the editor-in-chief and publisher of AiP, and Daniel Färm has been its director since 1 January 2021.
