= Sture Henriksson =

Swedish politician (1917–1957)

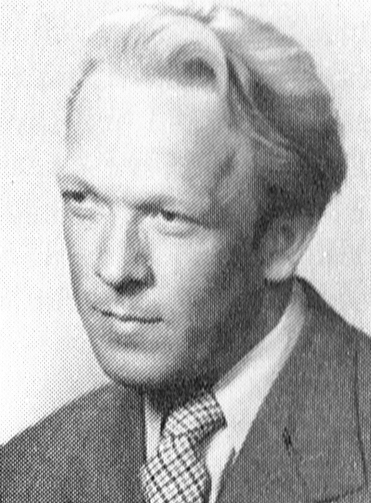

Minister of Communications
- In office 1957–1957
- Prime Minister: Tage Erlander

Personal details
- Born: 1917
- Died: 1957 (aged 39–40)
- Party: Social Democratic Party
- Occupation: Trade Unionist; Ombudsman

Sture Henriksson (1917–1957) was a Swedish trade unionist, ombudsman and social democrat politician who killed himself in 1957 while serving as the minister of communications.

== Biography ==
Henriksson was a trade unionist. He worked as an ombudsman in Civilian Personnel Association of the Swedish Armed Forces. He was a member of the Social Democratic Party and served at the Swedish Parliament. In 1949 he was one of the members of the tax commission at the Parliament. He edited the monthly journal of the Social Democratic Party entitled Tiden in 1956 and 1957.

Henriksson was appointed minister of communication to the cabinet led by Prime Minister Tage Erlander in 1957. Shortly after his appointment Henriksson committed suicide by hanging himself. The event occurred after Henriksson was arrested for drunkenness. His cabinet colleague Östen Undén later accused a ""gangster journalist" in Expressen of his death.
