= Oscar Björnstjerna =

Swedish officer, diplomat, and politician

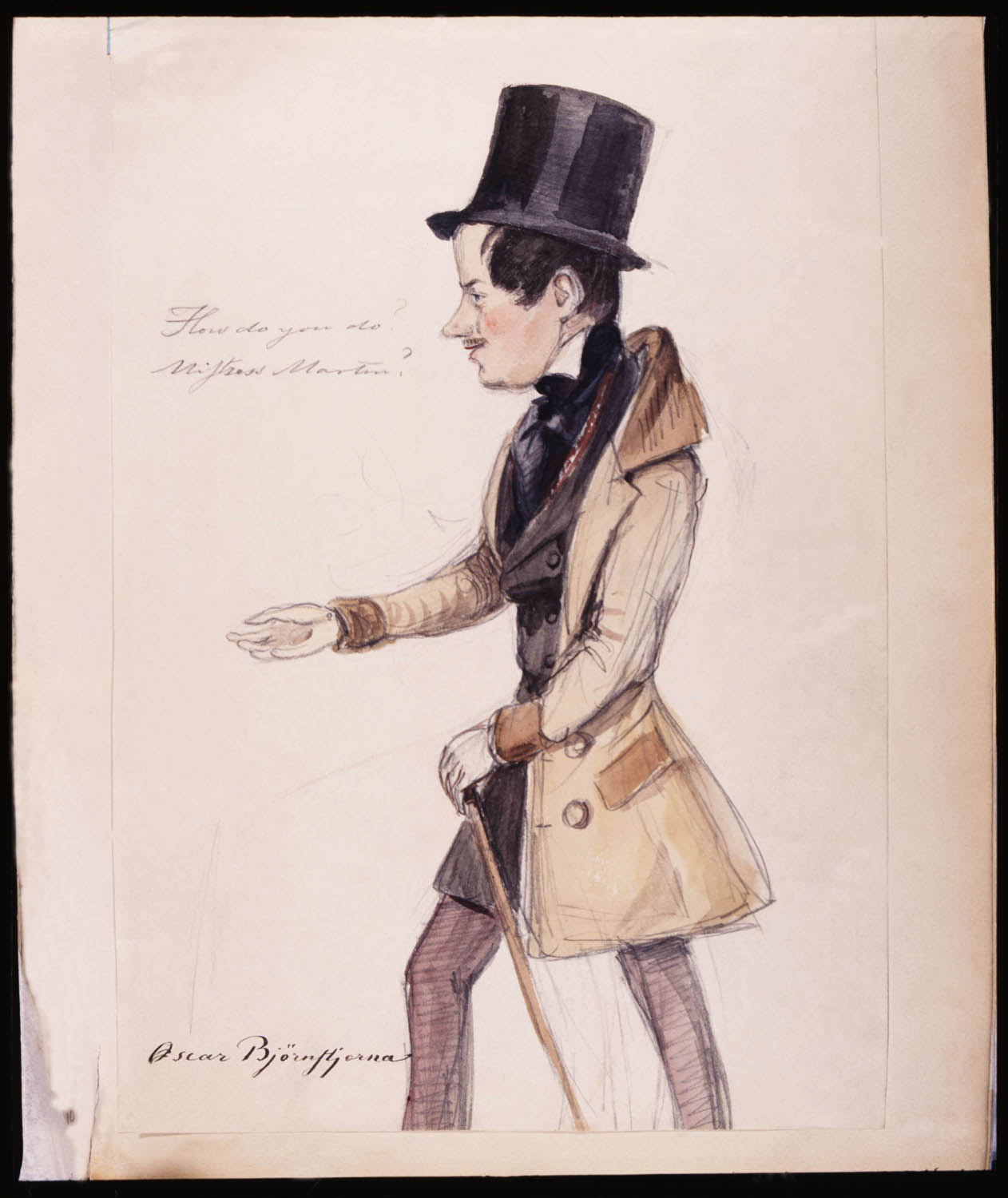
Caricature of Oscar Björnstjerna by Fritz von Dardel.

Oscar Magnus Fredrik Björnstjerna (6 March 1819, in Stockholm – 2 September 1905, in Stockholm) was a Swedish officer, diplomat and politician. He served as Minister for Foreign Affairs from 1872 to 1880.
