= Krister Wickman =

Swedish economist and politician (1924–1993)

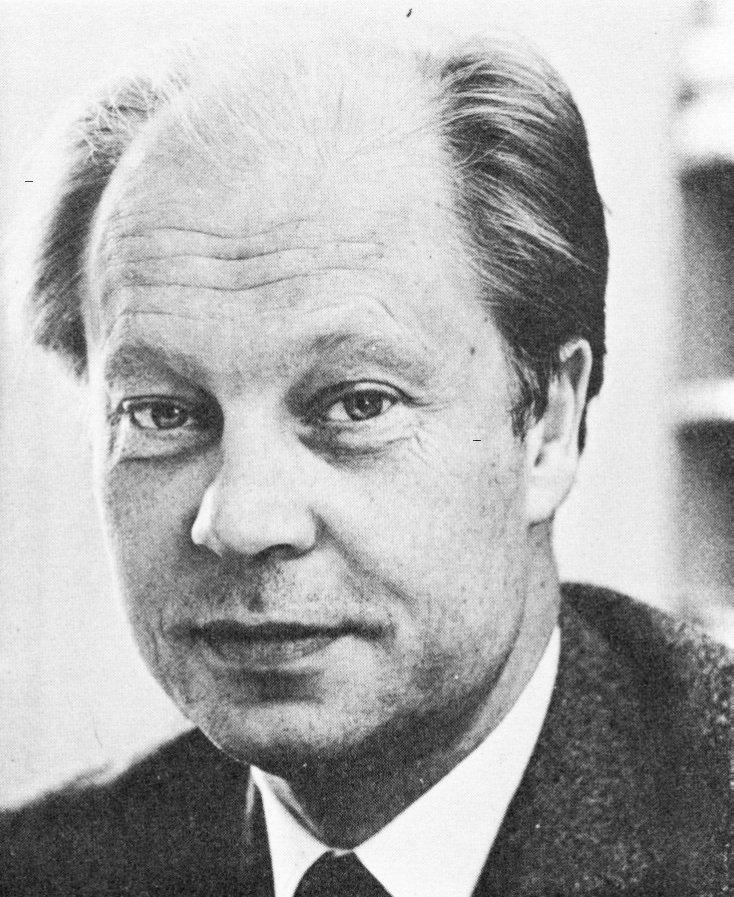

Minister for Foreign Affairs
- In office 30 June 1971 – 3 November 1973
- Prime Minister: Olof Palme
- Preceded by: Torsten Nilsson
- Succeeded by: Sven Andersson

Minister of Industry
- In office 1 January 1969 – 30 June 1971
- Prime Minister: Tage Erlander; Olof Palme
- Preceded by: Position established
- Succeeded by: Rune B. Johansson

Personal details
- Born: 13 April 1924 Stockholm, Sweden
- Died: 10 September 1993 (aged 69) Stockholm, Sweden
- Party: Swedish Social Democratic Party
- Occupation: Politician, economist

Hans Krister Wickman (13 April 1924 – 10 September 1993) was a Swedish politician. A member of the Social Democratic Party, he served as minister for foreign affairs from 1971 to 1973, and before that as minister of industry from 1969 to 1971. After his ministerial career, he was governor of Sveriges Riksbank from 1973 to 1976.

== Biography ==
Wickman's parents were Johannes Wickman (1882–1957), a journalist and editor at Dagens Nyheter, and Hervor Mellgren. While at university, Krister Wickman was a member of the Swedish Clarté League. He graduated with a Candidate of Law degree in 1948 and a licentiate in economics in 1953; he also studied classical languages and philosophy. From 1951, Wickman was employed at the National Institute of Economic Research. He was a secretary of state in the Ministry of Finance from 1959, and remained there until joining the government as a minister without portfolio in 1967. He also served as chairman of the Swedish Film Institute from 1963 to 1967, and was awarded for Special Achievement at the 4th Guldbagge Awards in 1967.

Wickman was minister of industry from 1969 until 1971, when he became minister for foreign affairs. Shortly after his appointment, Wickman started working to normalize diplomatic relations with Greece, which had been broken after the 1967 coup d'état and during the following military dictatorship in the country. He also signed a free trade agreement with the European Economic Community. Like Prime Minister Olof Palme, Wickman was openly critical of United States warfare in Vietnam, which led to a freeze in relations between Sweden and the US in the early 1970s. According to political scientist Marie Demker, Wickman's term as foreign minister coincided with a shift in Swedish foreign policy, with cooperation, peace and upholding of international law as central principles.

After his ministerial career ended in 1973, Wickman served as governor of Sveriges Riksbank until 1976.

== Honors ==
- Member of the Royal Swedish Academy of Engineering Sciences, 1975

Government offices
Preceded by None	Deputy Minister for Finance; 1967–1969	Succeeded by Bertil Löfberg
Preceded by Office established	Minister of Industry; 1969–1971	Succeeded by Rune B. Johansson
Preceded by Torsten Nilsson	Minister for Foreign Affairs; 1971–1973	Succeeded by Sven Andersson
Preceded by Per Åsbrink	Governor of the Swedish National Bank; 1973–1976	Succeeded by Carl Henrik Nordlander
