= Peter Hultqvist =

Swedish politician (born 1958)

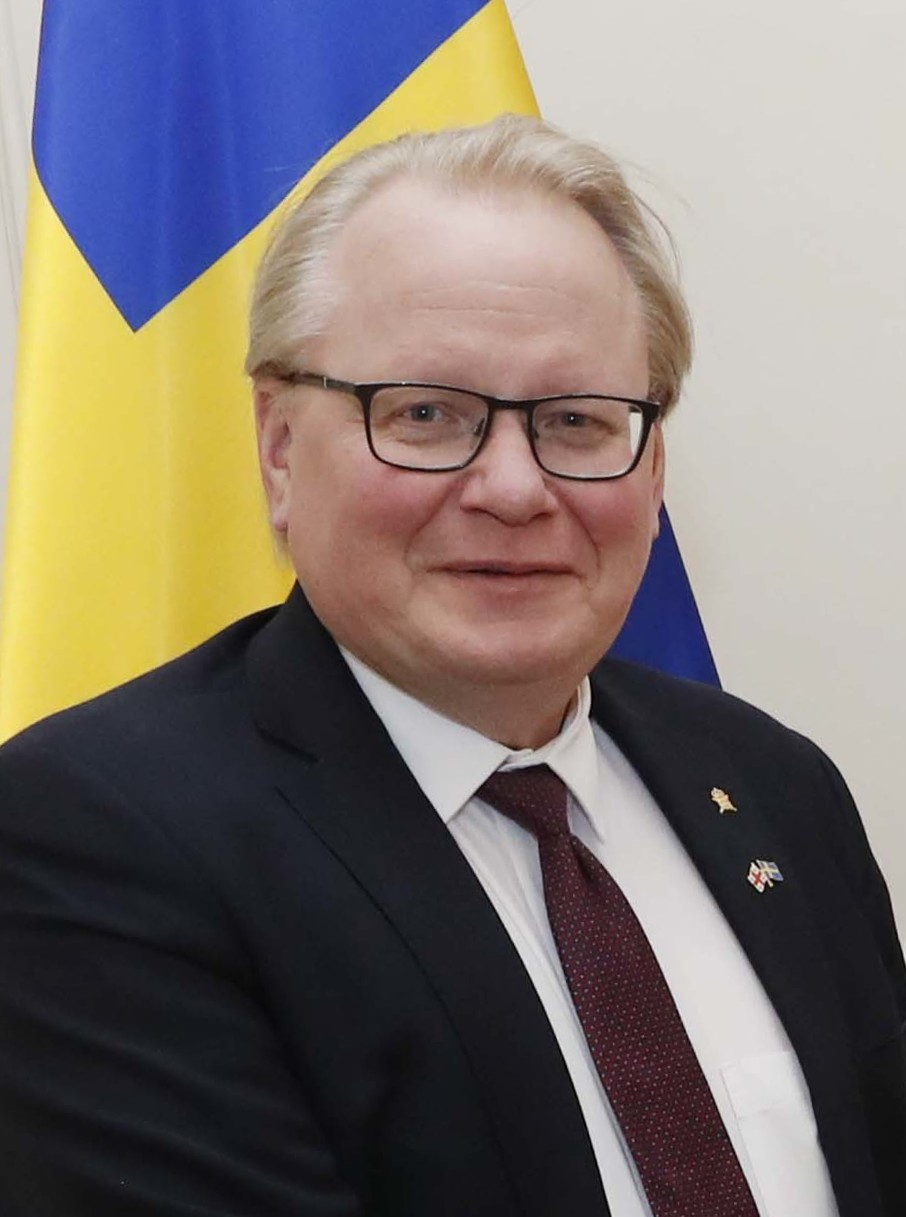
- Hultqvist in 2022

Minister of Defence
- In office 3 October 2014 – 18 October 2022
- Prime Minister: Stefan Löfven; Magdalena Andersson
- Preceded by: Karin Enström
- Succeeded by: Pål Jonson

Member of the Riksdag
- Incumbent
- Assumed office 2 October 2006
- Constituency: Dalarna County

Personal details
- Born: 31 December 1958 (age 67) Gävle, Sweden
- Party: Social Democratic

Carl Anders Peter Hultqvist (born 31 December 1958) is a Swedish politician of the Social Democrats who served as the Minister for Defence in the Swedish Government from 2014 to 2022.

== Background ==
Born in 1958, Hultqvist is of Finnish descent through his mother, who as a child was evacuated from Finland to Sweden during World War II. During his youth, he spent the summers in Kuusamo, his mother's village on the Finnish-Russian border, which had been burned by Soviet partisans during the Continuation War. Hultqvist's maternal grandfather, a farmer and a soldier in the Finnish Army, was killed in action during the war.

Hultqvist joined the Swedish Social Democratic Youth League in 1973, at age 15. Explaining his reasons for joining, he told Dagens Nyheter's Mikael Holmström that, "To me, communism was a totally dead option. It never existed in my mind. I have been completely vaccinated against all that. As for the right wing, I've never felt anything for it. This talk of free market forces and a belief in things sorting themselves out – I've never believed in that."

After graduating from high school in 1977, Hultqvist was conscripted to serve at the Dala Regiment in Falun. However, after only 57 days he was released, having reportedly registered as a conscientious objector. When asked about his release from military service by Svenska Dagbladet's defence correspondent Jonas Gummesson in 2016, Hultqvist refused to comment.

From 1977, Hultqvist embarked on a career as a journalist, in parallel with his political work. He was employed at two Social Democratic local dailies in Norrland, Dala-Demokraten and Norrländska Socialdemokraten, as well as at the Social Democratic party's political weekly Aktuellt i Politiken. He remains a columnist in Dala-Demokraten where he sat on the board from 1994 to 2014.

As an elected official, Hultqvist served from 1989 to 2006 as chairman of the Municipal Executive Committee of Borlänge. Between 2005 and 2009, he was a member of the leadership of the Social Democratic Party. In 2006, he was elected to the Riksdag. From 2011 to 2014, served as Chairman of the Committee on Defence in the Riksdag. In this role, Hultqvist began to attract attention for his attention to military affairs and for his hard line against Russia. He also reportedly received some pushback from fellow Social Democrats: "In the party, they think I'm a crank for talking so much about Russia", Hultqvist told Dagens Nyheter's defence correspondent Mikael Holmström in 2011.

Since 2022 he has again served as Chairman of the Defence Committee.

=== Minister of Defence (2014–2022) ===
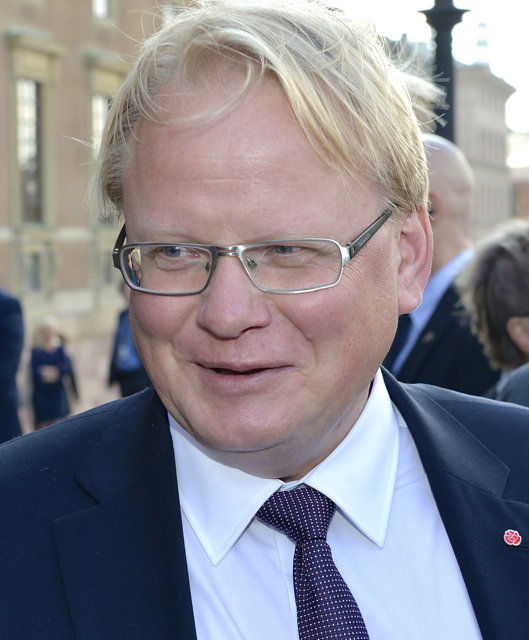
Hultqvist as newly appointed Minister for Defence.

Hultqvist was appointed minister for defence by Prime Minister Stefan Löfven on 3 October 2014.

As defence minister, Hultqvist pushed for Sweden's rearmament, oversaw the reintroduction of conscription, and led the Swedish military toward closer cooperation with NATO and the United States. He brought Sweden into unprecedentedly close military relationship with Finland, negotiating several cooperation agreements and meeting regularly Finnish politicians: "I meet Peter more often than my own mother", Finnish defence minister Jussi Niinistö joked in 2017. In 2018, Finnish President Sauli Niinistö (no relation) awarded Hultqvist the Grand Cross of the Order of the Lion of Finland in recognition of his work to strengthen Swedish-Finnish defence cooperation.

Hultqvist's misgivings about Vladimir Putin's government in Russia were underscored in several interviews by references to his family background and the time he spent in Kuusamo.

"It gives you a different type of sensibility about how to perceive Russian actions", Hultqvist told Dagens Nyheter in 2018. "I don't suffer from any sort of Russophobia or that kind of fear of Russia. But realism and being free of wishful thinking – that's something completely different!"

Having taken office after the Russian annexation of Crimea, Hultqvist's stance on defence issues and on Russia quickly won him considerable acclaim in Swedish defence circles, including within the liberal-conservative opposition, which generally favours Swedish NATO membership, in contrast to Hultqvist's own party.

"Peter Hultqvist has been described as being on the party's left", wrote political commentator Karin Eriksson in Dagens Nyheter in 2017. "But in his view of the nation and of defence issues, one might as well describe him as a right-winger or conservative (...) No other minister has received as much praise from pundits on the right."

A strong supporter of the Palestinian struggle for independence and a two-state solution, Hultqvist was, in 2015, awarded the Order of Merit by Palestinian President Mahmoud Abbas. Hultqvist co-created the Swedish-Palestinian Parliamentary Association in 2006 and served as its president until becoming defence minister in 2014. On receiving the decoration, he commented that he was proud to be part of a government that had, in 2014, made Sweden the first Western European nation to officially recognise Palestinian statehood.

==== 2017 vote of no confidence and further criticism ====
On 26 July 2017, a majority in the Riksdag announced they would put forward a vote of no confidence against him and two other ministers, in response to a scandal relating to a leak of classified information. However, in a press conference on 27 July, Löfven stated that Hultqvist would remain on his post.

The challenge to Hultqvist soon proved controversial within the opposition. Several prominent pro-opposition newspapers and a conservative former defence minister, Mikael Odenberg, publicly offered support to Hultqvist, who, they argued, was at most tangentially involved in the scandal and had performed well as minister of defence.

After a months-long political stand-off, the Liberal and Center parties rescinded their support for Hultqvist's removal. When the vote was held on 17 September 2017 it went in Hultqvist's favor, allowing him to remain as minister of defence.

Opposition criticism of Hultqvist picked up again in 2018, during a drawn-out debate over Sweden's defence budget, in which the liberal and conservative parties favoured higher spending than the government.

==== Accession of Sweden to NATO ====
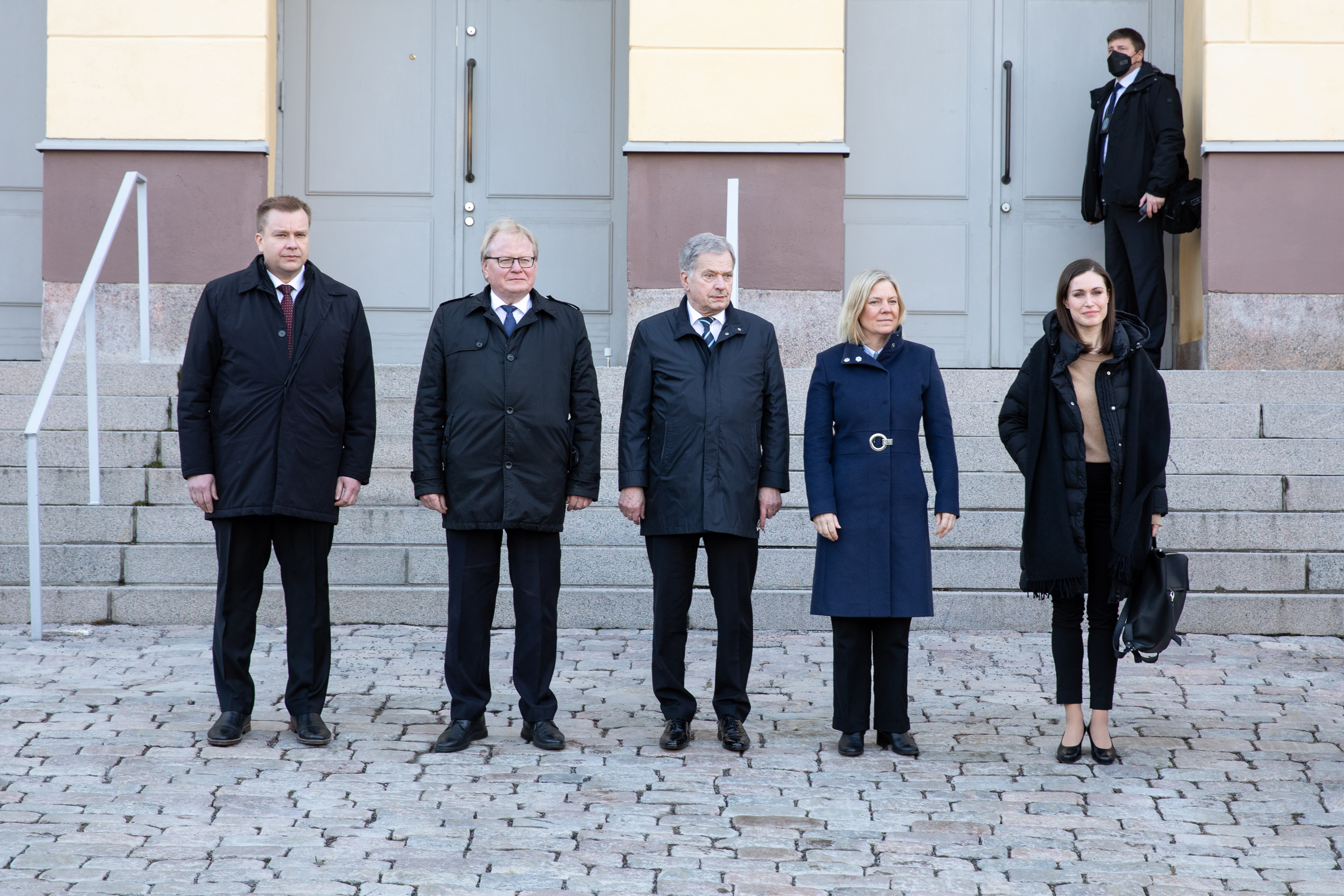
Hultqvist with Finnish Defence Minister Antti Kaikkonen, Finnish President Sauli Niinistö, Finnish Prime Minister Sanna Marin and Swedish Prime Minister Magdalena Andersson in Helsinki, 5 March 2022

During his time in office, Hultqvist has engineered a range of joint training exercises with NATO, such as the cold weather exercise Northern Wind, which was held in Sweden in March 2019.

In January 2022, he didn't rule out a possible attack against Sweden from Russia, and emphasized that “it's important for us to not be naive” and to “not be taken by surprise”. He also addressed the issue of Gotland, saying: “Whoever controls Gotland has a decisive influence on both the activity in the air and in the marine environment. This is something that changes the entire strategic course of events”. After the Russian invasion of Ukraine and Sweden applied to become a member of NATO, Hullqvist met with US Secretary of Defense Lloyd Austin at the Pentagon, to coordinate the Swedish accession with the US. Turkey is seeking the resignation of Hultqvist as Sweden's defence minister due to a 2011 meeting with the PKK (which has been designated as a terrorist organization in Sweden since 1984) in exchange for greenlighting the country's accession to NATO.

== Influence ==
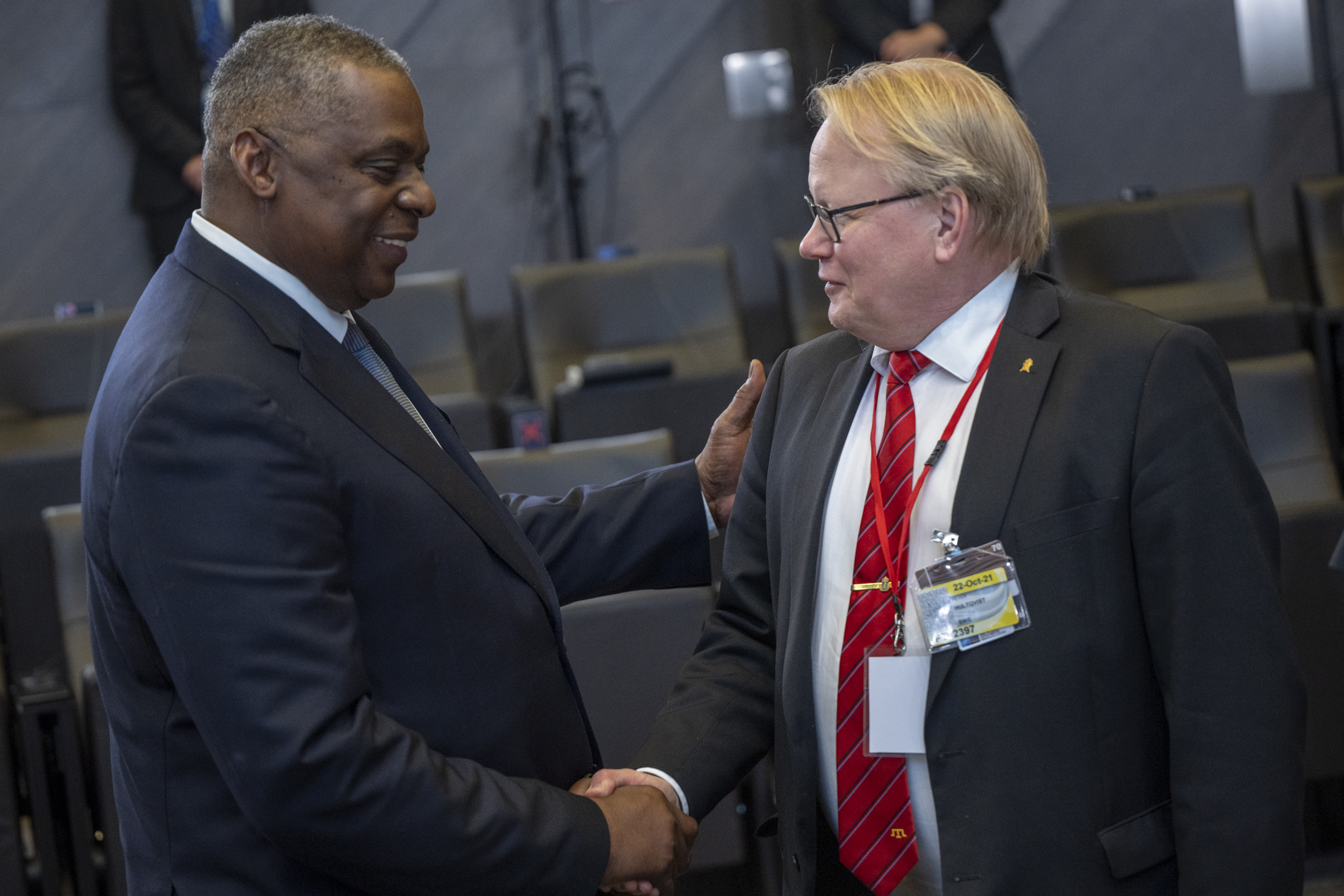
Hultqvist meets with US Secretary of Defense Lloyd Austin in 2021

His stance on defence policy has become known as the 'Hultqvist Doctrine'. The concept means increased defence spending and close relationships with United States, Finland, and NATO - without becoming a full member of NATO.

== Awards and decorations ==
=== Swedish ===
- (Sweden) Swedish Voluntary Engineers Medal of Merit in gold (Insatsingenjörernas Riksförbunds (IIR) förtjänstmedalj) (11 May 2022)
- (Sweden) Hjalmar Branting Honorary Medal

=== Foreign ===
- Commander Grand Cross of the Order of the Lion of Finland (3 April 2018)
- (Lithuania) Grand Cross of the Order for Merit
- (Brazil) Grand Officer of the Order of Aeronautical Merit (13 October 2020)
- (Palestine) Order of Merit and Distinction in gold

Political offices
Preceded by Karin Enström	Minister for Defence; 2014–2022	Succeeded by Pål Jonson
