= Enn Kokk =

Swedish politician, journalist, and writer (1937–2019)

- Born: 19 June 1937; Juminda peninsula, Estonia
- Died: 19 August 2019 (aged 82); Uppsala, Sweden
- Occupations: politician, journalist, writer

Enn Kokk (19 June 1937 – 19 August 2019) was a Swedish Social Democratic politician, journalist and writer.

Kokk was born in Juminda, Estonia and his family fled to Sweden in 1944. For many decades, Kokk was active within the leadership of the Social Democratic Party as an official, starting 1968. He was, amongst other things, chief editor for the party's magazine Aktuellt i Politiken for a few years. In 2000, he left the work in the program commission of the party due to his disagreement with the party's decision to support a Swedish membership in the Eurozone. During the referendum campaign on the issue in 2003, Kokk was a board member in the organisation Social Democrats Against the EMU.

He married Birgitta Dahl in 1986. He died on 19 August 2019 at the age of 82.
