= Allan Vougt =

Swedish politician

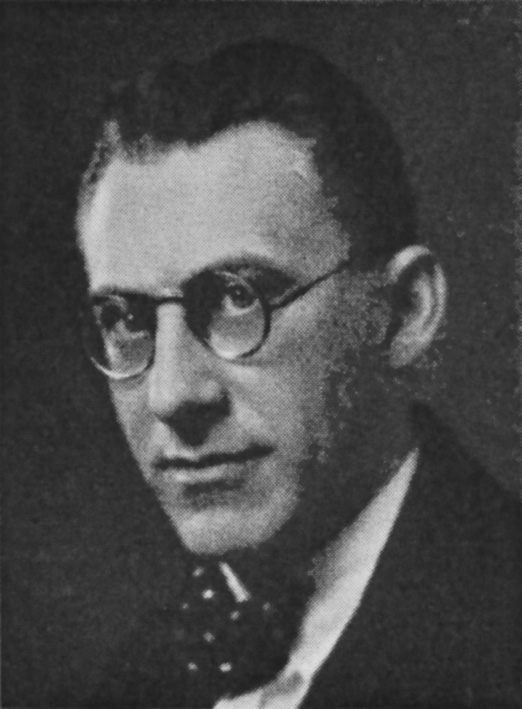
Allan Vougt

Allan Georg Fredrik Vougt (28 April 1895 – 24 January 1953) was a Swedish politician who served as Minister for Defence from 1945 to 1951. A member of the Social Democratic Party (SAP), he initially represented Fyrstadskretsen in the Riksdag from 1928 to 1948. He later served as Governor of Malmöhus from 1951 until his death in 1953.

Vougt was also a journalist and served as the editor-in-chief for the daily newspaper Arbetet during Hitler's occupation of Denmark and Norway, where he stated that Germany seemed "predestined to occupy a dominant position in a united Europe", a position which he claimed "no reasonable man, here in Scandinavia, would contest." He was sent to Denmark on behalf of the Social Democrats and wondered if the party should move in a new direction, as had the Danes and Norwegians, in cooperation with Nazi Germany based on pragmatic considerations rather than Nazi sympathies. However this view was largely rejected; Vougt, alongside other "men of 1940", was attacked for his defeatism and appeasing attitude that characterized the Social Democrats in the years around 1940. Vought's term as editor-in-chief of Arbetet ended in 1944 when he was replaced by Gösta Netzén.

As the editor-in-chief, a suit was brought against Vougt for libeling Benito Mussolini, who had been described by Arbetet as a madman. The Swedish press initially believed the suit had been brought by the Italian government as a demand for redress; it was later revealed that the proceedings commenced entirely at the initiative of the Swedish government. An anthology of Vougt's wartime articles was published by Arbetet under the title The Swedish Perspective.

Vougt was interviewed by journalist C. L. Sulzberger as defense minister and was described as "a man with a reputation for sticking his neck out." Sulzberger noted that Vougt was unpopular with his American counterparts who believed he gave permission to Germany to send troops across Sweden during the war.

Political offices
Preceded by Per Edvin Sköld	Swedish Minister for Defence; 1945 – 1951	Succeeded by Torsten Nilsson
