= Karin Söder =

Swedish politician (1928–2015)

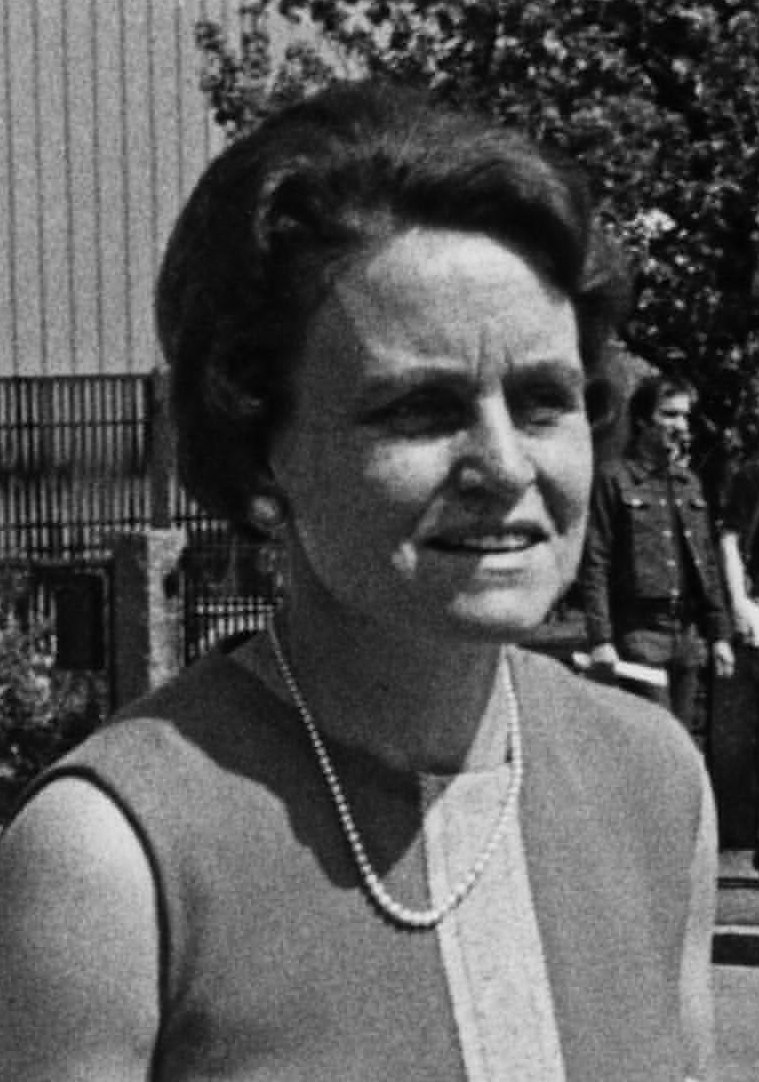

Minister for Foreign Affairs
- In office 8 October 1976 – 18 October 1978
- Prime Minister: Thorbjörn Fälldin
- Preceded by: Sven Andersson
- Succeeded by: Hans Blix

Minister for Health and Social Affairs
- In office 12 October 1979 – 8 October 1982
- Prime Minister: Thorbjörn Fälldin
- Preceded by: Gabriel Romanus
- Succeeded by: Sten Andersson

Personal details
- Born: Karin Ann-Marie Bergenfur; 30 November 1928 Kil, Sweden
- Died: 19 December 2015 (aged 87) Täby, Sweden
- Party: Centre Party
- Occupation: Teacher

Karin Ann-Marie Söder (née Bergenfur; 30 November 1928 – 19 December 2015) was a Swedish Centre politician. She was the first woman in Sweden to be elected the leader of a major political party. She headed the Swedish Centre Party from 1985 to 1987. She was also one of the first female foreign ministers in the world.

== Biography ==
Söder was born in Frykerud in Kil Municipality, Värmland. Having graduated from secondary school in Gothenburg, she studied in Falun, and worked as a teacher, first in Värmland and later in Täby, north of Stockholm, where she was a member of the local council from 1963 to 1971. She also sat on the Stockholm County Council from 1969 to 1973. She died in Täby in 2015.

== Political career ==
=== Ascendancy ===
In 1971, Söder was elected a Member of the Swedish Parliament, a position she held until 1991. The same year she became a member of parliament, she also became the second vice leader of the Centre Party. When Sweden got a centre-right government under Centre Party Prime Minister Thorbjörn Fälldin in 1976, she was named Minister for Foreign Affairs, the first woman ever to hold the post in Sweden. Söder's party left the government in 1978 over a conflict on nuclear power, and she was succeeded by liberal Hans Blix. In 1979 the Centre Party rejoined the coalition, and Söder returned to the Cabinet as Minister of Health and Social Affairs in 1979. The same year she was promoted to the post as the party's first vice leader. She held her ministerial post until the centre-right coalition lost the 1982 elections to the Social Democrats.

=== Leader of the Centre Party ===
In 1985, when Thorbjörn Fälldin stepped down after an unsuccessful election, she finally reached the highest position in her party, making the Centre Party the first major Swedish party to be headed by a woman. Her time at the top would however be short. For health reasons, she left the party leadership in 1987, succeeded by Olof Johansson.

=== Other positions ===
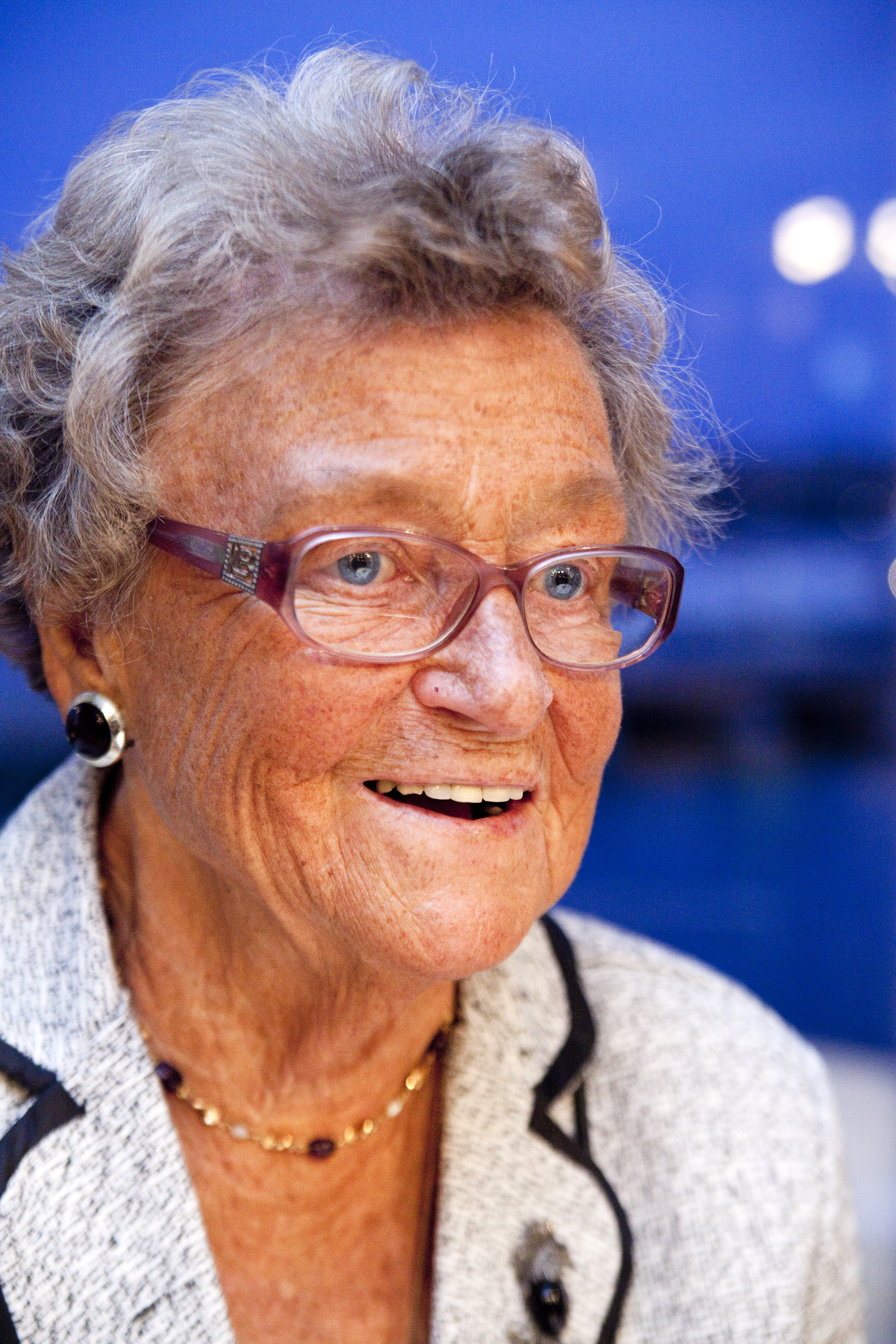
Karin Söder, 2012

During her years in politics, she also held posts as chairperson of Save the Children Sweden 1983–1995 and as President of the Nordic Council 1984–1985 and 1989–1990. She has also served as a member of several company boards, including Skandia and Wermlandsbanken, as well as on the Board of the Royal Institute of Technology. She once again made political headlines in 2003, when she co-signed an article urging her fellow party members to vote Yes in the Swedish Euro referendum, opposing the official party line.

Despite her varied accomplishments, the political legacy Söder is most known for among Swedes may be the 1980 reform that shut the stores of Systembolaget, the national alcoholic beverage retailing monopoly, on Saturdays. The policy remained in place for many years, but was abolished in 2001.

== Awards ==
Söder was awarded the Illis quorum by the government of Sweden in 1991.

Party political offices
Preceded by Thorbjörn Fälldin	Chairman of the Centre Party of Sweden; 1985–1987	Succeeded by Olof Johansson
Political offices
Preceded by Sven Andersson	Minister for Foreign Affairs; 1976–1978	Succeeded by Hans Blix
Preceded by Gabriel Romanus	Minister for Health and Social Affairs; 1979–1982	Succeeded by Sten Andersson
