= Tiden (magazine) =

Quarterly political magazine in Sweden

- Editor-in-chief: Payam Moula
- Categories: Political magazine
- Frequency: Quarterly
- Publisher: Tankesmedjan Tiden
- Founder: Hjalmar Branting
- Founded: 1908
- Country: Sweden
- Based in: Stockholm
- Language: Swedish
- Website: Tiden
- ISSN: 0040-6759
- OCLC: 163433420

Tiden (Swedish: The Times) is a quarterly theoretical political journal published in Stockholm, Sweden, since 1908. It is organ of the Social Democratic Party. Its original subtitle was Tidskrift för socialistisk kritik och politik (Swedish: Journal of Socialist Criticism and Politics) which is later changed to Socialdemokratisk idé- och debattidskrift (Swedish: Magazine of the Social Democratic Views and Debate).

== History and profile ==
Tiden was established by the Swedish social democrat politician Hjalmar Branting in 1908. It is an official publication of the Social Democratic Party which was started to provide a platform for political and cultural discussions among the party members.

Tiden was a monthly publication from 1908 to 1917. In the period between 1918 and 1929 it came out eight times per year. Then it was published ten times per year from 1930 to 1992. From 1999 its frequency was switched to bimonthly. It is published by Tankesmedjan Tiden, a leftist think tank founded in 2006, on a quarterly basis. The magazine is headquartered in Stockholm.

== Editors and contributors ==
Many leading politicians from the Social Democratic Party edited Tiden, including its founder Hjalmar Branting. The others included Pierre Schori and Gösta Edgren. Sture Henriksson edited the magazine between 1956 and 1957. Since March 2018 its editor-in-chief has been Payam Moula.

The contributors of Tiden have been mostly members of the party, including Olof Palme. One of them was Birgitta Dahl who published articles in the magazine on gender equality. Carl Lindhagen, mayor of Stockholm, argued in his article published in the magazine in 1910 that social democracy should integrate humanism and avoid dogmatism.

However, Tiden has also had international contributors such as German political scientist Fritz Croner who used the term planned economy for the first time in Tiden during World War I referring to German economic planning. A well-known Swedish economist Gunnar Myrdal also contributed to Tiden publishing articles on the planning of economy in Sweden.
