= Sven Aspling =

Swedish politician (1912–2000)

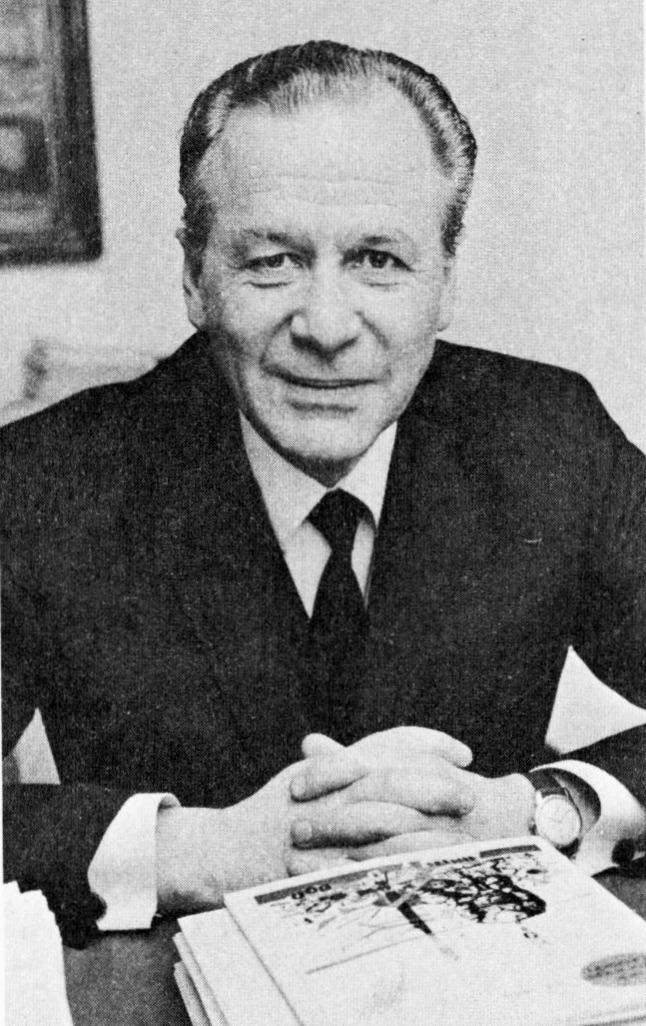

Minister of Health and Social Affairs
- In office 1962–1976
- Prime Minister: Tage Erlander; Olof Palme
- Preceded by: Torsten Nilsson
- Succeeded by: Rune Gustavsson

Personal details
- Born: August 28, 1912 Filipstad, Sweden
- Died: February 6, 2000 (aged 87) Sundbyberg, Sweden
- Party: Social Democratic Party
- Awards: Illis quorum 1987

Sven Gustav Aspling (28 August 1912 – 6 February 2000) was a Swedish social democrat politician who served as the general secretary of the Social Democratic Party and minister of health and social affairs. He was also a long-term member of the Swedish Parliament for the party.

== Biography ==
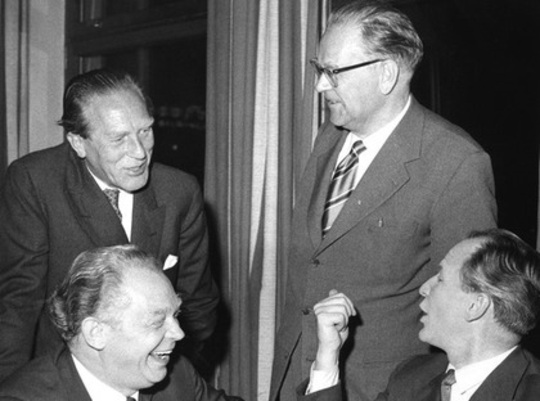
Left to right: Sven Andersson, Torsten Nilsson, Tage Erlander and Sven Aspling in 1960

Aspling was born in Filipstad, Värmland, in 1912 to the train driver Gustaf Persson and his wife Alida Aspling. He worked as a sawmill worker. During the period 1937–1942, he was the local editor of Värmlands Folkblad in Filipstad.

In 1942 Aspling came to Falun as the ombudsman of the Social Democratic Party. In this capacity he played a significant role in the transfer of Nordic refugees during World War II. He served as the organizational secretary in the party board between 1946 and 1948. He was the secretary of the party from 1948 to 1962. During his term as the party secretary he launched a magazine in 1953, Aktuellt i Politiken, which is still in circulation. When he was in office he was also appointed a board member to the advertising group, namely Förenade ARE-Bolagen, which was partly owned by the party.

Aspling was a member of the Swedish Parliament for almost three decades, 1956–1985. In 1962 he succeeded Torsten Nilsson as the minister of social affairs, a position he held until 1976. Aspling served in the post in the cabinets led by both Tage Erlander and Olof Palme. One of the significant bills during Aspling's tenure was the retirement bill that became effective in July 1976. It changed the retirement age from 67 to 65.

He was awarded the Illis quorum in 1987.

== Personal life and death ==
As of 2011 one of his children, Björn, was a public accountant in Falun. Another, Anders, was the dean of the Swedish Institute of Management in 2010.

Sven Aspling was one of the last persons who called and talked to Prime Minister Olof Palme on the evening of 28 February 1986 shortly before he was assassinated in Stockholm. Aspling was the author of several books, including Med Erlander och Palme (1999). He died at his home in Sundbyberg in February 2000.
