= Sven Andersson (politician) =

Swedish politician

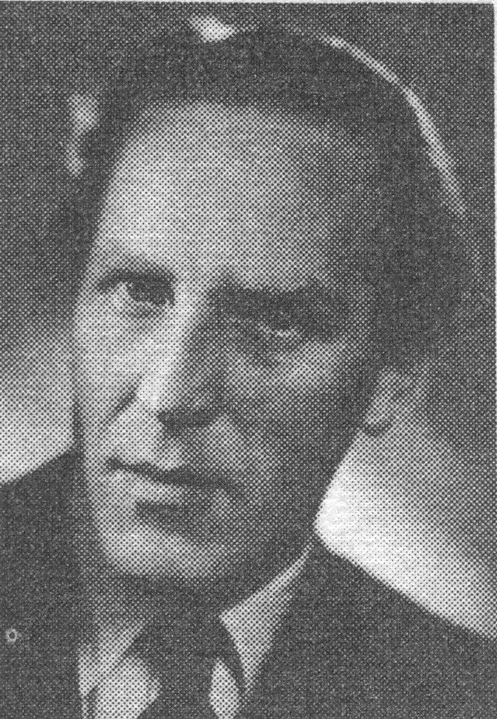
- Sven Andersson in 1964

Minister for Foreign Affairs
- In office 3 November 1973 – 8 October 1976
- Prime Minister: Olof Palme
- Preceded by: Krister Wickman
- Succeeded by: Karin Söder

Minister for Defence
- In office 22 March 1957 – 31 October 1973
- Prime Minister: Tage Erlander; Olof Palme
- Preceded by: Torsten Nilsson
- Succeeded by: Eric Holmquist

Minister for Communications (Transport)
- In office 1 October 1951 – 22 March 1957
- Prime Minister: Tage Erlander
- Preceded by: Torsten Nilsson
- Succeeded by: Sture Henriksson

Personal details
- Born: Sven Olof Morgan Andersson; 5 April 1910 Gothenburg, Sweden
- Died: 21 September 1987 (aged 77) Stockholm, Sweden
- Party: Swedish Social Democratic Party
- Awards: Illis quorum (1987)

Sven Olof Morgan Andersson (5 April 1910 – 21 September 1987) was a Swedish Social Democratic politician. He served as Minister for Defence from 1957 to 1973, and as Minister for Foreign Affairs from 1973 to 1976. Andersson also served as Minister for Communications (Transport) from 1951 to 1957.

== Biography ==
Andersson was born in Gothenburg. Prior to his political career, he held various jobs as a bookshop clerk, bookbinder's apprentice and carpenter. From 1929 to 1937 he was on the leadership of the Gothenburg branch of the Social Democratic Youth League, and from 1934 to 1940 on the national leadership. After studies at the Nordic Folk High School in Geneva, he worked as an instructor with the Workers' Educational Association (ABF) in Gothenburg from 1932 to 1935, and as an ombudsman for the Social Democratic labour commune there from 1935 to 1945. Andersson was also an editor of Stockholms-Tidningen, a Social Democratic newspaper.

From 1945 until 1948, Andersson was party secretary of the Social Democratic Party, and remained in the leadership of the party until 1975. He served as a minister without portfolio in the government of Tage Erlander from 1948 to 1951, and then became Minister for Communications (Transport). Andersson was appointed Minister for Defence in 1957; he would serve in this position for 16 years until 1973, making him the longest-serving Minister of Defence in Swedish history. During his time as cabinet minister, Andersson became known as a staunch anti-communist and a defence hawk. He was implicated in the so-called IB affair in 1973, when an illegal surveillance agency focused on monitoring Swedish left-wing organizations and activists became public knowledge.

After leaving his position as Minister of Defence, he served as Minister of Foreign Affairs until 1976. He continued to head several government investigations and serve on special government committees after his ministerial career ended.

== Awards and honours ==
- Illis quorum, 1987
- Honorary member of the Royal Swedish Society of Naval Sciences

Government offices
Preceded by Torsten Nilsson	Minister of Communications (Transport); 1951–1957	Succeeded by Sture Henriksson
Preceded by Torsten Nilsson	Minister of Defence; 1957–1973	Succeeded by Eric Holmqvist
Preceded by Krister Wickman	Minister for Foreign Affairs; 1973–1976	Succeeded by Karin Söder
