= Östen Undén =

Swedish academic, civil servant and politician (1886–1974)

His Excellency Östen Undén
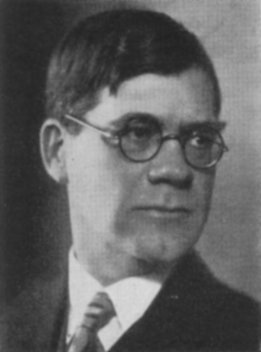
- Undén in 1937

Minister for Foreign Affairs
- In office 31 July 1945 – 19 September 1962
- Prime Minister: Per Albin Hansson (1945–1946); Tage Erlander (1946–1962)
- Preceded by: Christian Günther
- Succeeded by: Torsten Nilsson
- In office 18 October 1924 – 7 June 1926
- Prime Minister: Hjalmar Branting (1924–1925); Rickard Sandler (1925–1926)
- Preceded by: Erik Marks von Würtemberg
- Succeeded by: Eliel Löfgren

Minister of Justice
- In office 10 March 1920 – 30 June 1920
- Prime Minister: Hjalmar Branting
- Preceded by: Eliel Löfgren
- Succeeded by: Assar Åkerman

Prime Minister of Sweden Acting for 5 days
- In office 6 October 1946 – 11 October 1946
- Monarch: Gustaf V
- Preceded by: Per Albin Hansson
- Succeeded by: Tage Erlander

Personal details
- Born: Bo Östen Undén; 25 August 1886 Karlstad, Sweden
- Died: 14 January 1974 (aged 87) Bromma, Sweden
- Resting place: Uppsala Old Cemetery
- Party: Social Democrats
- Spouse: Agnes Jacobsson (m. 1912; died 1935)
- Relations: Torsten Undén (brother); Olof Kaijser (cousin)
- Education: Uppsala University; Lund University

Bo Östen Undén (25 August 1886 – 14 January 1974) was a Swedish statesman, academic, and diplomat who served as Minister for Foreign Affairs from 1924 to 1926 and again from 1945 to 1962. He briefly acted as Prime Minister of Sweden following the death of Per Albin Hansson in October 1946. A member of the Social Democratic Party (SAP), Undén represented Värmland in the Riksdag from 1934 to 1965.

== Early life ==
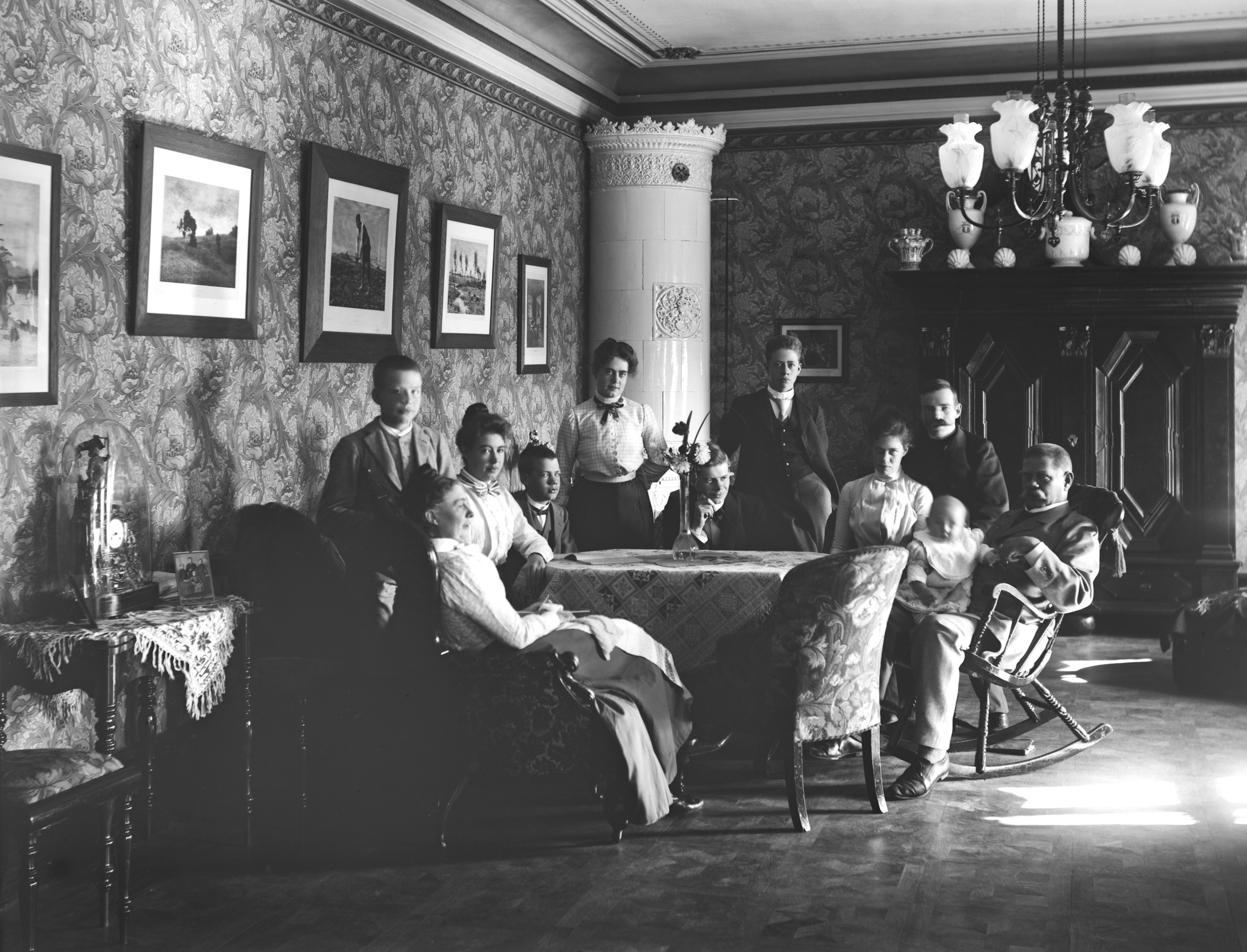
At the home of the Undén family at Kungsgatan 14 in Karlstad circa 1900. Fourth person from the left is Östen.

Undén was born on 25 August 1886 in Karlstad, Sweden, the son of pharmacist Viktor Undén (1844–1923) and Beate Kaijser. He was the brother of Envoy Torsten Undén (1877–1962) and community leader Greta Gullström (1879–1980), and through her, brother-in-law of pharmacist and politician Stellan Gullström (1871–1951). He was a cousin of diplomat Olof Kaijser (1914–2002).

He completed his upper-secondary examination in 1904, received a Bachelor of Arts degree from Lund University in 1905, a Candidate of Laws degree in 1910, and a Licentiate of Laws and Doctor of Laws in 1912.

== Career ==
=== Academic career ===
In 1912, Undén became an associate professor (docent) of civil law at Lund University. He was appointed professor of civil law and private international law at Uppsala University in 1917, serving in that position until 1937. From 1929 to 1932, he served as rector magnificus of Uppsala University, and from 1937 to 1951, he was university chancellor.

=== Public service career ===
Undén served as the Swedish Foreign Ministry's expert on international law, minister for foreign affairs (1924–1926, 1945–1962), minister without portfolio (1917–1920, 1932–1936), and chaired the Riksdag's committee on foreign relations during World War II.

At the same time, Undén may be acknowledged as a chief representative for Sweden's covert Cold War adaptation to the United States, as in his view, the Swedish governmental agencies, including the Defence Forces, were free to conclude any agreements with foreign powers and agencies that did not literally contradict international treaties Sweden was a party of, as long as he and his ministry were not formally involved. As an effect, the Swedish government could, before the founding of NATO, agree to build air bases in eastern Scandinavia suitable for bombing missions against Leningrad. A similar adaptation included integration in the U.S. embargo policy from the Korean War.

=== International politics ===
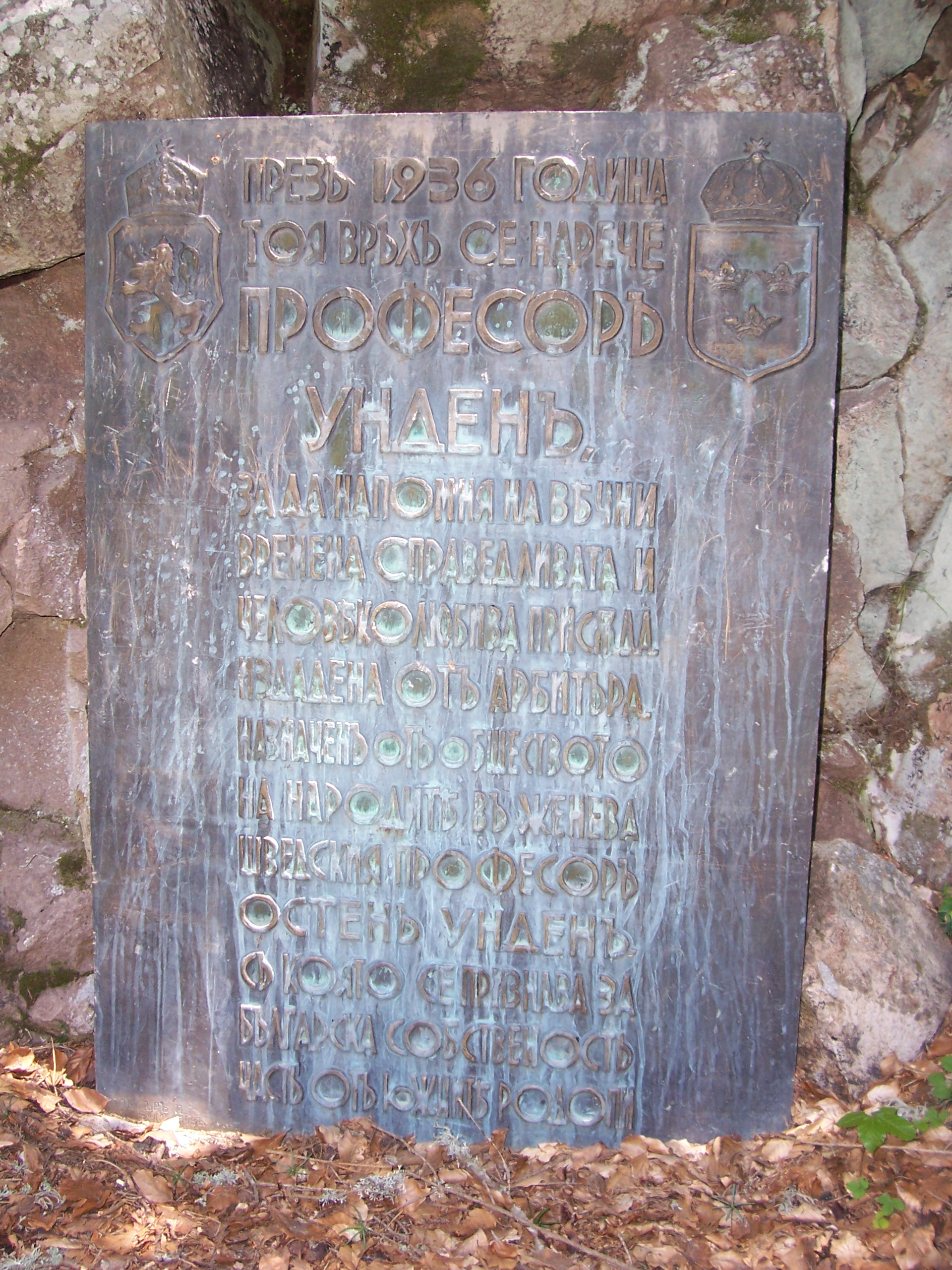
Undén's memorial on the Professor Unden peak in Rhodope Mountains, Bulgaria.

In the years 1930 to 1933, as a League of Nations arbiter, Undén ruled in favour of Bulgaria in a dispute with Greece regarding the ownership of 19 forests in the Dospat region of southwestern Bulgaria. In 1936, the summit of Dikchan (1,966 m (6,450 ft)) in the surrounding Rhodope Mountains was named Professor Unden after Undén for his efforts. A bronze memorial plate featuring the Bulgarian and Swedish coats of arms as well as an inscription regarding the name's origin were placed on top of the peak.

In 1961, his "Undén Proposal" argued that states without nuclear weapons should declare that they refused to produce such weapons and refuse to receive and store such weapons. Undén's proposal was accepted by the United Nations General Assembly as a UN resolution with 58 votes in favour (Scandinavia, Warsaw pact, third world countries), 10 votes against (NATO members) and 23 votes of abstention (Latin America, former French colonies in Africa).

== Personal life ==
In 1912, Undén married Agnes Jacobsson (1887–1935), the daughter of Court of Appeal registrar Nils Jacobsson and Anna Persson. They had two children: Karin "Kajsa" (1914–2016) and Ingar (1916–1997). Through his wife, he was the brother-in-law of Governor Malte Jacobsson (1885–1966). Their daughter Karin was married to Justice of the Supreme Court Arne Brunnberg (1909–2001).

== Legacy ==
Undén was widely respected in politics, particularly within the Social Democratic Party, but was never uncontroversial. Ideologically, he belonged with the left-wing faction of the party, and has in retrospect been criticized for his optimistic view of the Soviet Union, which remained for the entirety of his time as Foreign Minister.

As of 2025, Undén's time as foreign minister, a total of 18 years, 9 months, and 15 days spread out in two non-consecutive terms across an almost 40-year period set between 1924 and 1962, remains the longest in Swedish history.

== Awards and honours ==
=== Awards ===
- (Sweden) King Gustaf V's Jubilee Commemorative Medal (1948)
- (Sweden) Gustav Adolf Medal in Gold (1936)
- (Netherlands) Grotius Medal

=== Honorary degrees ===
- University of Oslo, Doctor of Laws (1938)
- Sofia University, Doctor of Laws (1939)
- University of Copenhagen, Doctor of Laws (1945)
- University of Toulouse, Doctor of Laws (1952)
- Uppsala University, Doctor of Philosophy (1945)

=== Honours ===
- Honorary member of the Royal Physiographic Society in Lund (1938)
- Honorary member of the Royal Society of Arts and Sciences in Gothenburg (1940)
- Member number of the Royal Swedish Academy of Sciences (1940)
- Honorary member of the Royal Society of Sciences in Uppsala (1940)
- Member of the Royal Society of the Humanities at Lund (Kungliga Humanistiska Vetenskapssamfundet i Lund) (1943)
- Honorary member of the Royal Swedish Academy of Letters, History and Antiquities (1944)
- Member of the Norwegian Academy of Science and Letters
- Honorary member of the Finnish Lawyers' Association (Juridiska föreningen i Finland)
- Member of the Institute of International Law (1928)
- Member of the Royal Academies for Science and the Arts of Belgium (1938)
- Institut de France (1946)

Political offices
Preceded by Eliel Löfgren	Minister for Justice; 1920–1920	Succeeded by Assar Åkerman
Preceded by Erik Marks von Würtemberg	Swedish Minister for Foreign Affairs; 1924–1926	Succeeded by Eliel Löfgren
Preceded by Christian Günther	Swedish Minister for Foreign Affairs; 1945–1962	Succeeded by Torsten Nilsson
Preceded by Per Albin Hansson	Acting Prime Minister of Sweden; Acting; 1946	Succeeded by Tage Erlander
Academic offices
Preceded by Ludvig Stavenow	Rector of Uppsala University; 1928–1932	Succeeded by Otto Lagercrantz
