= Pål Jonson =

Swedish politician (born 1972)

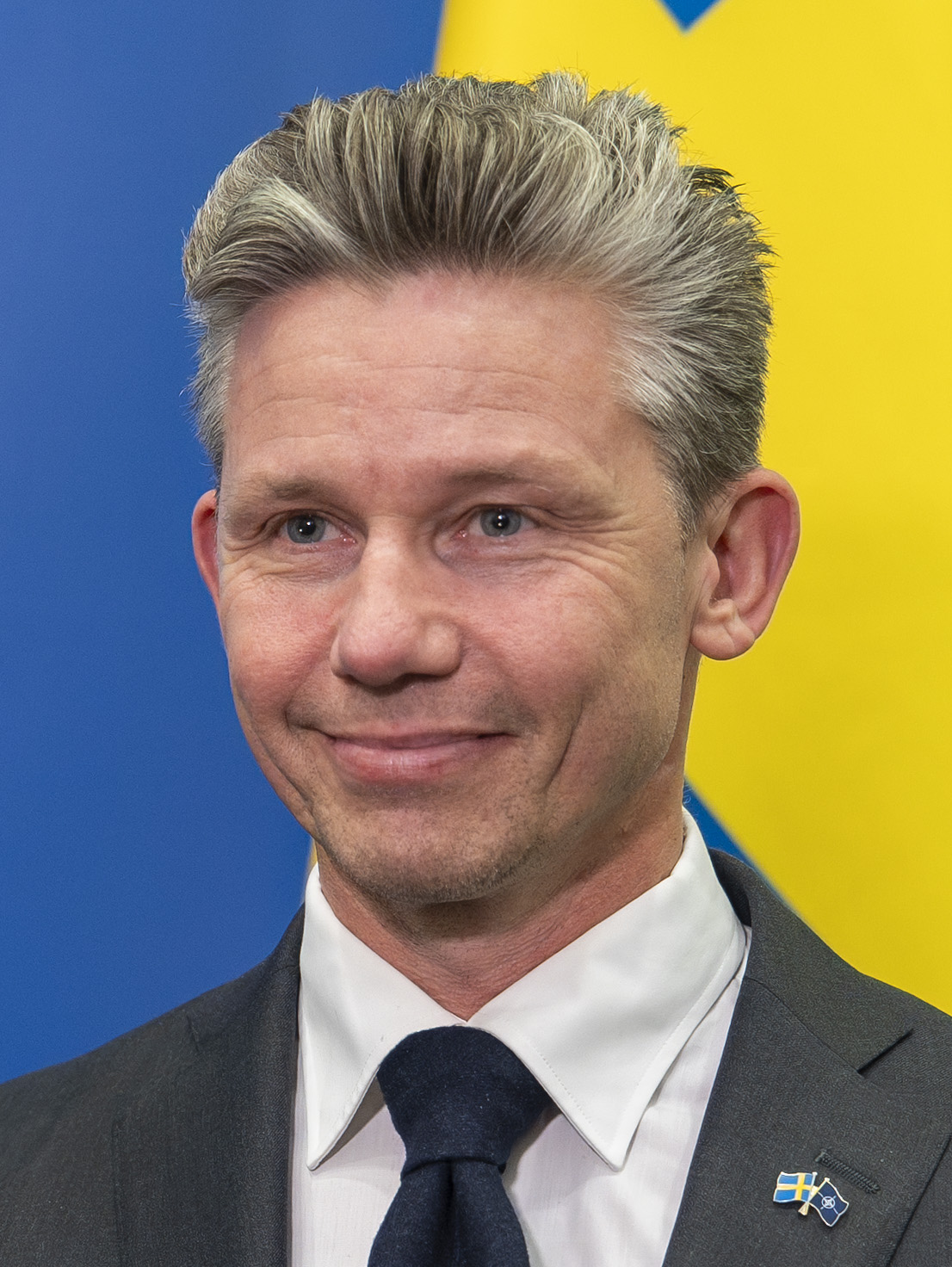
- Jonson in 2025

Minister for Defence
- Incumbent
- Assumed office 18 October 2022
- Monarch: Carl XVI Gustaf
- Prime Minister: Ulf Kristersson
- Preceded by: Peter Hultqvist

Member of the Riksdag
- Incumbent
- Assumed office 12 October 2016
- Preceded by: Pia Hallström
- Constituency: Värmland County

Personal details
- Born: 30 May 1972 (age 54) Arvika, Sweden
- Party: Moderate
- Education: Georgetown University (BA); College of Europe (MA); King's College London (PhD)

Military service
- Branch/service: Swedish Navy
- Years of service: 1994
- Rank: Private (Coastal Ranger)
- Unit: Vaxholm Coastal Artillery Regiment (KA1)

Pål Henning Jonson (born 30 May 1972) is a Swedish politician of the Moderate Party. He has served as Minister for Defence in the cabinet of Ulf Kristersson since 2022.

== Biography ==
Jonson was born on 30 May 1972, in Älgå on the northwestern shore of Lake Glafsfjord (Göta-Älv basin). His parents, Bo Jonson and Marya Jonson, were farmers.

In 1991, Jonson graduated from the sports gymnasium in Lycksele. In 1998 he graduated from Georgetown University, where he studied international politics and received a bachelor's degree. He graduated with a Master of Arts in European politics from the College of Europe in 1999. In 2005, he completed his Ph.D. in military science from King's College London.

He worked as an analyst at the Swedish Defence Research Agency from 2000 to 2005 and was head of the Moderate Party's office in the European Parliament from 2005 to 2006. He served as political advisor within the Ministry of Defence from 2006 to 2007 and as political advisor on foreign affairs for the Moderate Party in the Riksdag from 2007 to 2012. He was a visiting researcher at the NATO Defense College (NDC) in 2009.

Jonson was Communications Director of the Swedish Security & Defence Industry Association (Sv: Säkerhets- och försvarsföretagen) and Secretary-General of the Swedish Atlantic Council from 2013 to 2016.

Jonson was elected to the municipal council in Arvika Municipality for the Moderate Party in 2006 and was chairman of the Moderate Party in Värmland County from 2010 to 2012. Following the death of Pia Hallström in 2016, Jonson succeeded her as member of the Riksdag for the Värmland County constituency.

=== Minister for Defence (2022–present) ===
As Minister for Defence, Jonson oversaw Sweden’s accession to the North Atlantic Treaty Organization. Sweden deposited its instrument of accession on 7 March 2024, becoming NATO’s 32nd member, followed by a flag-raising at NATO Headquarters on 11 March 2024.

In 2024 Sweden met NATO’s 2% of GDP defence-spending guideline, according to NATO estimates. For 2025, the Government projected appropriations for the military defence of SEK 138 billion. In June 2025, the Riksdag approved borrowing of SEK 300 billion to accelerate force growth, ammunition stocks and air defence, with officials describing a trajectory toward around 3.5% of GDP by the early 2030s.

Under Jonson, Sweden expanded and systematised military support to Ukraine. On 11 September 2025, the Government presented a framework of SEK 40 billion for military support in both 2026 and 2027. Earlier packages included the transfer of Stridsvagn 122 (Leopard 2A5) tanks and, in May 2024, a pledge to donate two ASC 890 airborne surveillance and control aircraft. In May 2024, reports stated that Sweden places no geographic restrictions on the use of donated weapons beyond international law.

Jonson oversaw the negotiation and implementation of the Defence Cooperation Agreement (DCA) with the United States, signed on 5 December 2023 and in force from 15 August 2024. The DCA enables U.S. access to agreed facilities in Sweden (17 locations) and pre-positioning under the NATO SOFA framework. Implementation advanced in 2025, including a first infrastructure agreement signed between U.S. European Command and the Swedish Armed Forces on 3 June 2025. In parallel, Sweden entered the U.S. State Partnership Program with the New York National Guard on 12 July 2024; subsequent exchanges have focused on training and capability development.

== Honours ==
- Estonia: Order of the Cross of Terra Mariana, 1st Class (2 May 2023)
- Japan: Order of the Rising Sun, 2nd Class, Gold and Silver Star (3 November 2026)

Political offices
Preceded by Peter Hultqvist	Minister for Defence; 2022–present	Incumbent
