= Fredrik Ramel =

Swedish baron, governor, diplomat and officer

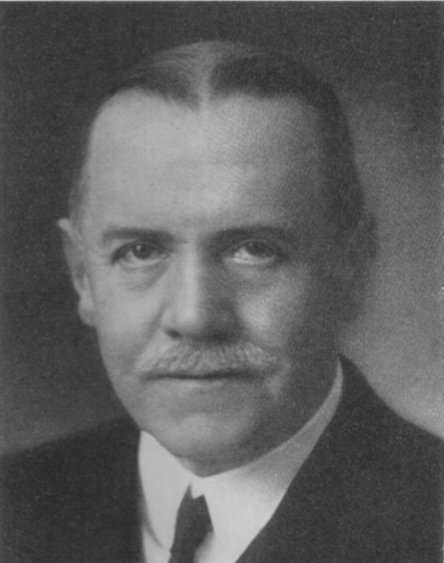

Governor of Malmöhus County
- In office 1925–1938

Personal details
- Born: 9 December 1872
- Died: 30 October 1947 (aged 74)
- Occupation: diplomat

Sten Gustaf Fredrik Troil Ramel (9 December 1872 – 30 October 1947) was a Swedish baron, governor, diplomat and officer. He was the Governor of Malmöhus County from 1925 to 1938.

== Biography ==
He was the son of Hans Fredrik Ramel and Carolina Alexandrina von Troil.

Ramel studied law in Lund and took his graduation in 1890 and became law notary in 1897. Ramel started his diplomatic career first as an attaché in the foreign ministry in 1895. The same year he worked at the consulate general in Rome, to become second secretary at the foreign ministry in 1897, first secretary in 1900 and cabinet secretary, in 1908 to 1913. As cabinet secretary Ramel handled feuds with Norway, he has been described as pro-German.

As Secretary of State he worked to implement the Oslo convention.

Government offices
Preceded by Albert Ehrensvärd	State Secretary for Foreign Affairs; 1908–1913	Succeeded by Oskar Ewerlöf
Preceded by Robert De la Gardie	Governor of Malmöhus County; 1925–1938	Succeeded by Arthur Thomson
Preceded by Ernst Trygger	Minister for Foreign Affairs; 1930–1932	Succeeded by Rickard Sandler
Diplomatic posts
Preceded by Gustaf Falkenberg	Envoy of Sweden to Norway; 1913–1923	Succeeded by Torvald Höjer
Preceded by Hans-Henrik von Essen	Envoy of Sweden to the German Reich; 1923–1925	Succeeded by Einar af Wirsén
