= Gösta Netzén =

Swedish journalist and politician (1908–1984)

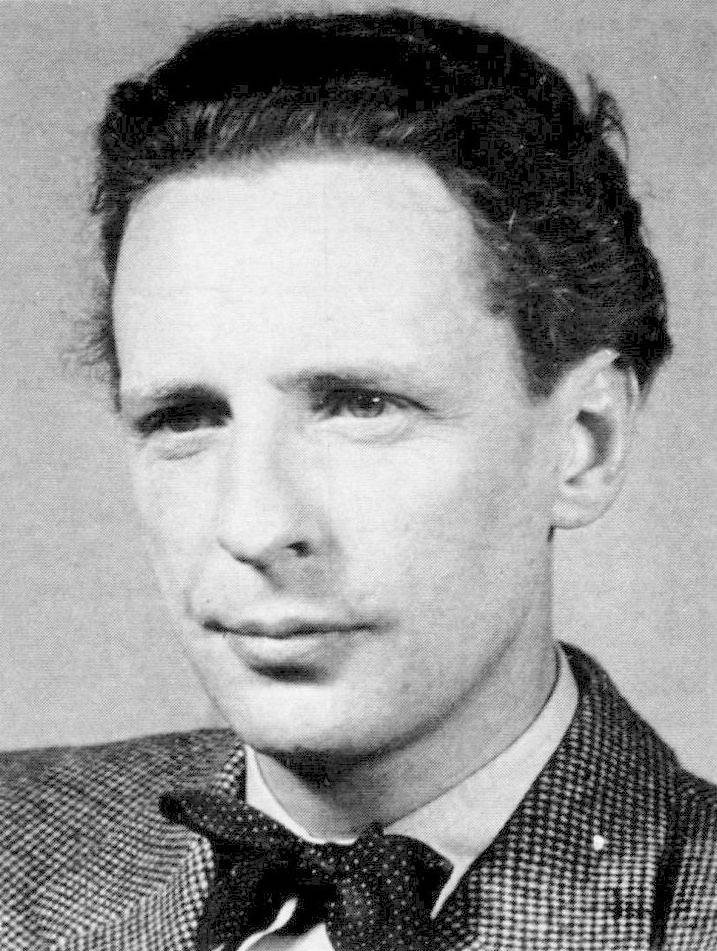

Minister of Agriculture
- In office November 1957 – November 1961
- Prime Minister: Tage Erlander

Personal details
- Born: Klas Gösta Netzén; 30 January 1908 Valbo, Sweden
- Died: 20 June 1984 (aged 76) Ystad, Scania, Sweden
- Party: Social Democratic Party
- Spouse: Margit Eliasson

Gösta Netzén (30 January 1908 – 20 June 1984) was a Swedish journalist and social democratic politician. He was the editor-in-chief of various newspapers, including Arbetet. He served as the minister of state and minister of agriculture between 1957 and 1961.

== Early life ==
Born Klas Gösta Netzén on 30 January 1908 in Valbo in Gävleborg county his parents were factory worker Erik Petter Netzén and Tilda Olsson. From 1924 he worked as a mechanic.

== Career ==
Netzén was a member of the Social Democratic Party. He was the local editor for the newspaper Arbetarbladet between 1927 and 1930 and worked for another newspaper, Enköpings Nyheter, between 1930 and 1931. He served as the editor of Tierps Nyheter from 1931 to 1934. Next year he was appointed ombudsman of the farm workers' union in the Uppland district. He was the editor of the newspaper Lantarbetaren from 1936 to 1944. He was named as the editor-in-chief of Arbetet in 1944 succeeding Allan Vougt in the post. Netzén remained in the post until 1957. During this period he along with Jan Fridegård and Hampe Faustman wrote a manuscript which would be used as a scenario for the 1946 Swedish film When the Meadows Blossom.

Netzén's political career began in 1949 when he was elected to the second chamber of the Swedish parliament where he served until 1961. He was the minister of state and minister of agriculture from November 1957 to November 1961. The cabinet was led by Prime Minister Tage Erlander. Netzén was appointed governor of the Malmöhus county in 1961, and his term ended in 1973. Next year he was also named as the civil commander for the southern civil region which he also held until 1973.

== Personal life and death ==
Netzén married Margit Eliasson (1910–1966) in Malmö on 22 February 1936. He died in Ystad on 20 June 1984.
