= Eliel Löfgren =

Swedish jurist and politician

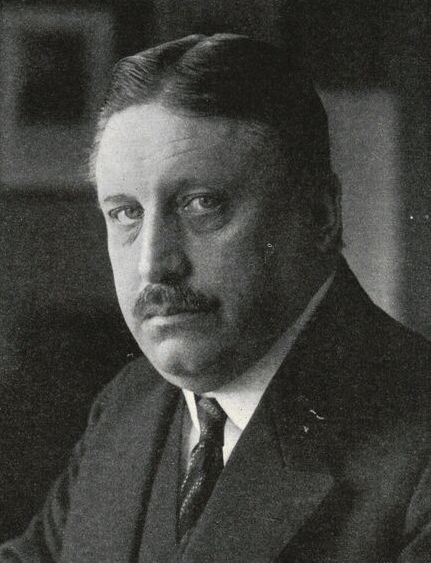
- Born: 15 March 1872
- Died: 8 April 1940 (aged 68)
- Occupation: jurist • politician

Jonas Eliel Löfgren (15 March 1872 – 8 April 1940) was a Swedish politician and jurist who served as Minister of Justice from 1917 to 1920 and as Minister for Foreign Affairs from 1926 to 1928. He led the Liberal Party of Sweden from 1923 to 1930 and represented Stockholm in both chambers of the Riksdag on several occasions between 1910 and 1937.
