= Erlander I cabinet =

Government cabinet of Sweden from 1946 to 1951

Tage Erlander's first cabinet
- 38th Cabinet of Sweden

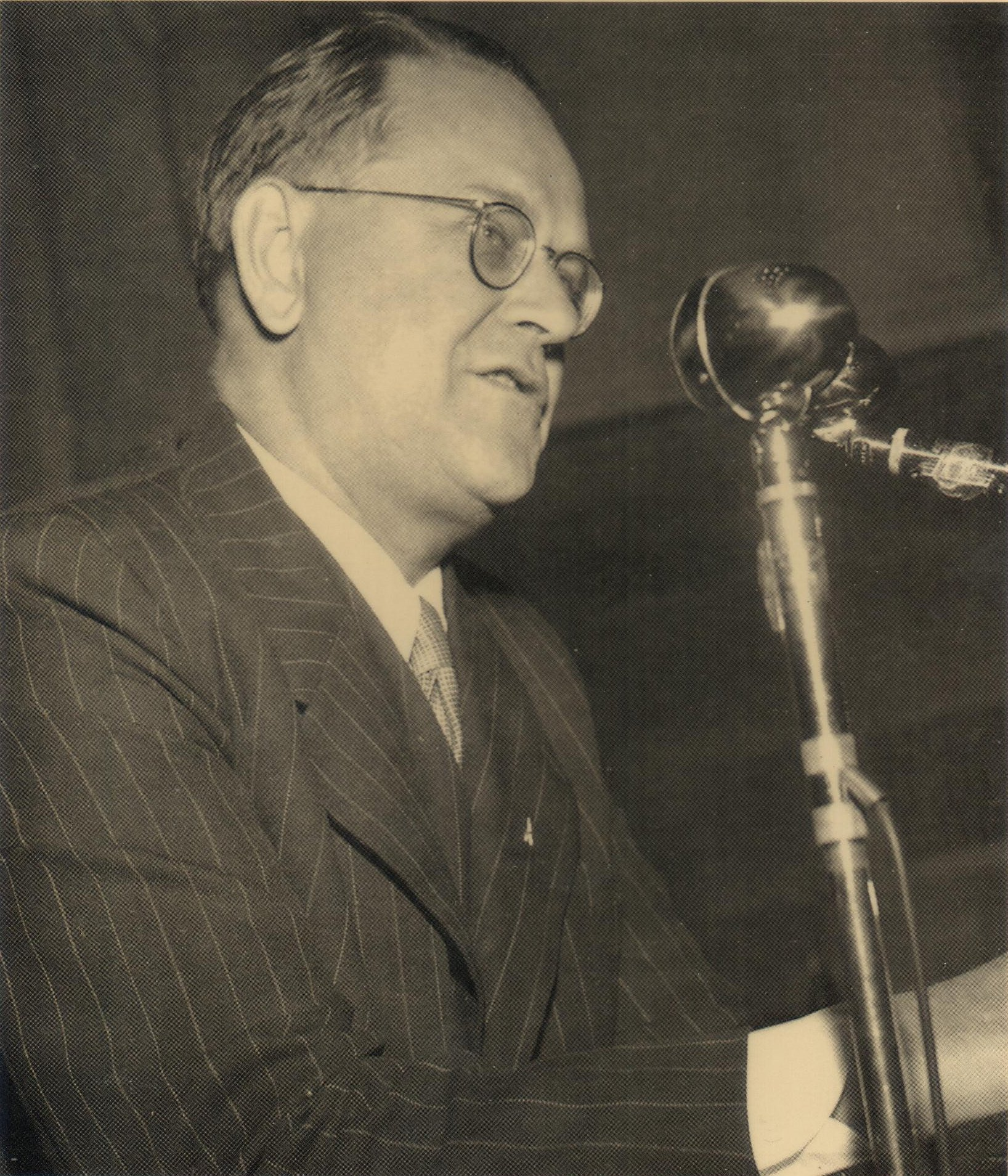
- Prime Minister Tage Erlander
- Date formed: 11 October 1946
- Date dissolved: 1 October 1951

People and organisations
- King: Gustaf V (1946–1950); Gustaf VI Adolf (1950–1951)
- Prime Minister: Tage Erlander
- Member party: Social Democrats
- Status in legislature: Single-party majority (upper house); Single-party minority (lower house)
- Opposition parties: National Organization of the Right; Rural Party Farmers' League; People's Party; Communist Party of Sweden

History
- Incoming formation: Passing of Per Albin Hansson
- Outgoing formation: Successful negotiations with the Farmers' League
- Election: 1948 election
- Predecessor: Hansson IV cabinet
- Successor: Erlander II cabinet

The Erlander I cabinet was the government of Sweden from 11 October 1946 to 1 October 1951. It was a Social Democratic single-party government led by Prime Minister Tage Erlander.

The cabinet was installed following the sudden death of incumbent Prime Minister Per Albin Hansson on 6 October 1946. It was succeeded by the Erlander II cabinet, a coalition government between the Social Democrats and the centre-right Farmers' League.

== Ministers ==
Tage Erlander was formally named Prime Minister on Friday morning, 11 October 1946. Erlander initially kept the same constellation of ministers, with the only new name in government being Josef Weijne, replacing Erlander as Minister of Education and Ecclesiastical Affairs.

The Erlander I cabinet is known for being the first Swedish cabinet with a woman as cabinet minister, when Karin Kock-Lindberg was appointed to the cabinet in 1947.

Portfolio	Minister	Took office	Left office	Party
Prime Minister	Tage Erlander	11 October 1946	1 October 1951	Social Democrats
Minister for Justice	Herman Zetterberg	11 October 1946	1 October 1951	Social Democrats
Minister for Foreign Affairs	Östen Undén	11 October 1946	1 October 1951	Social Democrats
Minister for Defence	Allan Vougt	11 October 1946	1 October 1951	Social Democrats
Minister for Social Affairs	Gustav Möller	11 October 1946	1 October 1951	Social Democrats
Deputy Minister for Social Affairs	Eije Mossberg	11 October 1946	1 July 1947	Social Democrats
Minister for Communications	Torsten Nilsson	11 October 1946	1 October 1951	Social Democrats
Ministry for Finance	Ernst Wigforss	11 October 1946	30 June 1949	Social Democrats
Ministry for Finance	David Hall	1 July 1949	17 October 1949	Social Democrats
Ministry for Finance	Per Edvin Sköld	21 October 1949	1 October 1951	Social Democrats
Minister for Wages	John Lingman	4 January 1950	1 July 1950	Social Democrats
Minister for Agriculture	Per Edvin Sköld	11 October 1946	29 October 1948	Social Democrats
Minister for Agriculture	Gunnar Sträng	29 October 1948	1 October 1951	Social Democrats
Deputy Minister for Agriculture	Gunnar Sträng	11 October 1946	11 April 1947	Social Democrats
Minister of Commerce and Industry	Gunnar Myrdal	11 October 1946	29 October 1948	Social Democrats
Minister of Commerce and Industry	Axel Gjöres	11 April 1947	24 September 1948	Social Democrats
Minister of Commerce and Industry	John Ericsson i Kinna	24 September 1948	1 October 1951	Social Democrats
Minister of the Interior	Eije Mossberg	1 July 1947	1 October 1951	Social Democrats
Minister for Civil Service Affairs	John Lingman	1 July 1950	1 October 1951	Social Democrats
Minister of Supply	Axel Gjöres	11 October 1946	11 April 1947	Social Democrats
Minister of Supply	Gunnar Sträng	11 April 1947	29 October 1948	Social Democrats
Minister of Supply	Karin Kock-Lindberg	29 October 1948	31 December 1949	Social Democrats
Minister of Supply	John Ericsson i Kinna	1 January 1950	30 June 1950	Social Democrats
Minister of Education and Ecclesiastical Affairs	Josef Weijne	11 October 1946	8 March 1951	Social Democrats
Minister of Education and Ecclesiastical Affairs	Hildur Nygren	17 March 1951	1 October 1951	Social Democrats
Legal Counsel	Gunnar Danielson	11 October 1946	1 October 1951	
Legal Counsel and Minister for Churches	Nils Quensel	11 October 1946	1 October 1951	
Minister for Fuel	John Ericsson i Kinna	11 October 1946	28 October 1948	Social Democrats
Minister for Economic Questions	Karin Kock-Lindberg	11 April 1947	28 October 1948	Social Democrats
Minister for Economic Questions	Sven Andersson	28 October 1948	1 October 1951	Social Democrats
Minister for Economic Organization	Per Edvin Sköld	28 October 1948	21 October 1949	Social Democrats
Minister of Foreign Trade	Dag Hammarskjöld	6 February 1951	1 October 1951	

== Policy ==
=== Social reforms ===
Following the Second World War, social reform was the pillar of Swedish social democracy. The architect behind the Swedish welfare reforms during this period was the Minister for Social Affairs, Gustav Möller.

During the reign of the Erlander I cabinet, the following reforms were implemented:

- A system of public health insurance for all, legislation which was passed in December 1946 and originally planned to come into effect in 1950, was implemented on 1 January 1955 after two delays. The system included free healthcare, state-funded medication prescriptions and paid sickness leave for workers.
- In 1947, a unanimous Riksdag approved the barnbidrag; a policy of children's allowance for all children younger than 16.
- Rents were lowered and construction of new housing was subsidized.
- The Worker's Protection Board was established in 1949, an authority responsible for protecting workers' rights. Work during the night was essentially prohibited. In 2001, the board was reformed as the Swedish Work Environment Authority.

=== Economic policy ===
During the war, it was feared that an economic depression would follow after the war's end. The economist Gunnar Myrdal warned of this coming depression in his 1944 book Varning för fredsoptimism (sv). But in 1945, it became clear that the economy was improving. As a consequence, inflation increased in 1946 and 1947 whilst a deficit in the balance of trade became all the more clear. The Swedish currency reserve ran out when the import surplus reached two billion crowns.

Thus, in 1947, reforms and regulations were implemented in order to curb the Swedish import. Making imports and out-going international payments was made more difficult. Rationing on coffee, tea and cocoa was re-introduced. In April 1948, rationing on gasoline was introduced. The rationing and economic difficulties were criticized by the opposition, especially by the liberal People's Party which under the new leadership of Bertil Ohlin had hardened their policies and become the leading right-wing opposition party. The People's Party along with the Right Party spoke of "Krångel-Sverige" (lit. "Hassle-Sweden") and chastised the Social Democrats, branding them as an authoritarian party which wanted to regulate things solely because of principles. The reforms were also regarded as an attempt to socialize the private sector.

An inquiry into Sweden's taxation policy was ordered in October 1945 and the subsequent 1946 report authored by Ernst Wigforss proposed that the income tax on poor people should be lowered while the income tax on people with high incomes should be raised. The final proposed legislation suggested raising the corporate tax from 32 percent to 40 percent, mandatory taxation on fortunes exceeding 20 000 crowns and a special tax on certain inherited estates. The debate surrounding the tax reform was harsh. The Svea Court of Appeal ruled the proposed inheritance tax as unconstitutional, since the constitution at the time stated that "no-one is to be deprived of their property without a legal verdict". The tax reform was nonetheless approved by the Riksdag.

Monetary policy was focused on keeping interest rates low. Ivar Rooth, the head of the Swedish National Bank resigned in December 1948 when a dispute between the board and himself regarding implementing policies he regarded as inflationary. In September 1949, the Swedish crown was devalued, a day after the British pound sterling was devalued.

== 1948 general election ==
The opposition's criticism of government policy was sparked by the 1948 general election, when the tone between the ruling Social Democrats and the opposition turned unusually bitter. A prevalent topic during the election revolved around the financing of the parties. Morgon-Tidningen, a Social Democratic newspaper, claimed that the People's Party was receiving contributions from "Big Finance", amounting to almost four million crowns. The claims were later found to be untrue, and were conveyed to the newspaper by a Social Democratic MP.

The election was a success for the People's Party which increased its share of the vote by over seven percentage points compared to the 1946 local elections. The Right Party and the Swedish Communist Party performed poorly in the election.

== Resignation ==
Following the 1948 general election, the Social Democrats began cooperating more closely with the Farmers' League. Talks were held about forming a coalition were initiated but were ultimately unproductive. In the summer of 1951, however, talks were resumed and on 28 September 1951 it was agreed that a joint Social Democratic and Farmer's League government would be formed. The Farmer's League eventually received four ministerial positions in the Erlander II cabinet.

Preceded by Hansson IV cabinet	Government of Sweden; 1946–1951	Succeeded by Erlander II cabinet
