= Minister for Rural Affairs (Sweden) =

Swedish cabinet position

- Sveriges landsbygdsminister
- Lesser coat of arms of Sweden

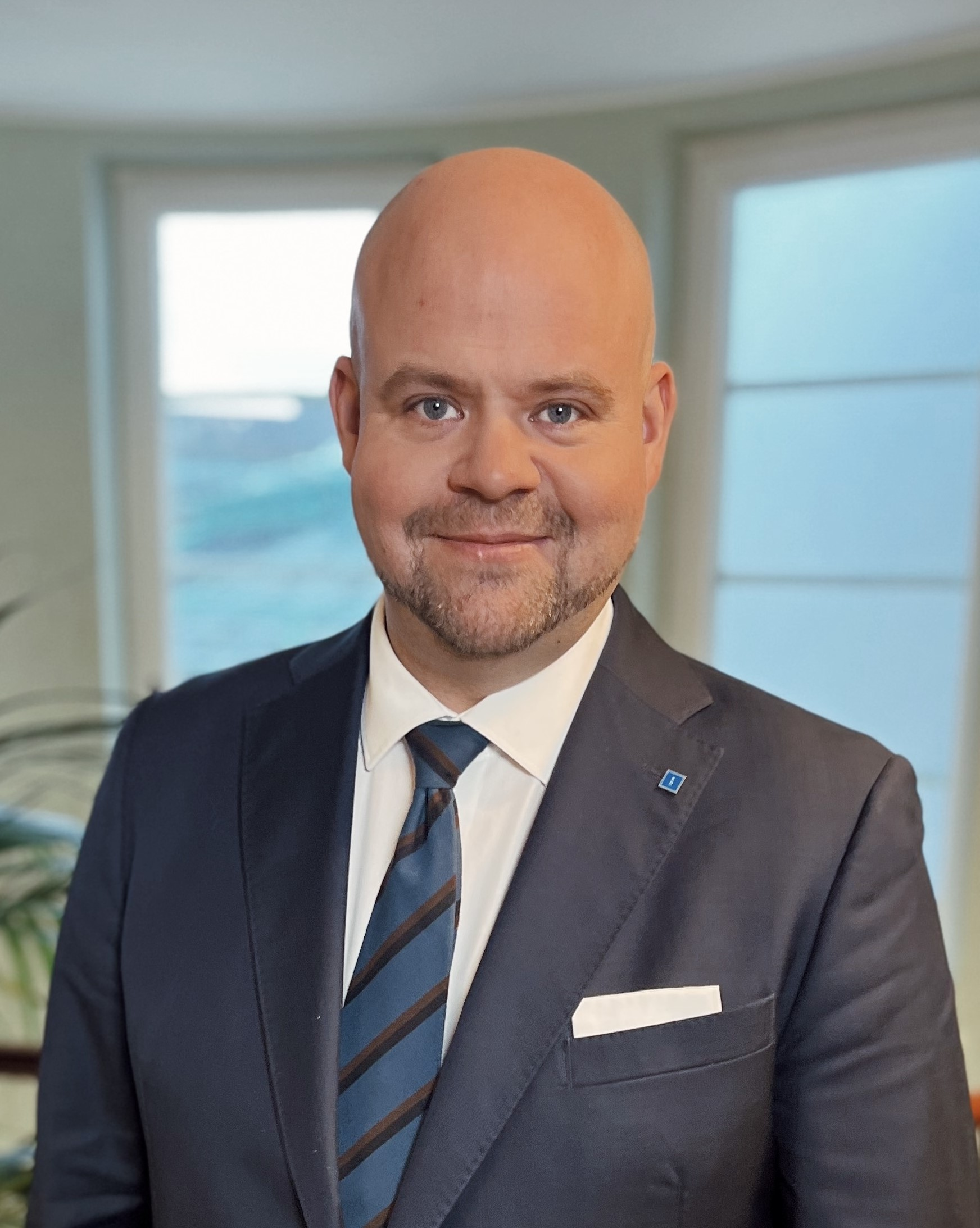
- Incumbent; Peter Kullgren since 18 October 2022
- Member of: Government
- Appointer: Prime Minister
- Inaugural holder: Theodor Odelberg
- Formation: 1900
- Website: Ministry for Rural Affairs

The Minister for Rural Affairs (formally cabinet minister and head of the Ministry for Rural Affairs and prior to that Minister of Agriculture) is a position in the Government of Sweden since November 2021 and previously from 1900 to July 2021. It was merged into the office of Minister for Business, Industry and Innovation in July 2021 but was re-established in November 2021 by newly appointed Prime Minister Magdalena Andersson. It was also kept after the government shift due to the 2022 Swedish general election, when current minister Peter Kullgren (KD) was appointed.

The officeholder was a member and minister of the Swedish Government and appointed by the Prime Minister. The minister headed the Ministry for Rural Affairs until 2014, when the office was placed under the Ministry of Enterprise. The officeholder was responsible for agriculture and environmental issues relating to agriculture, fishery, reindeer husbandry, Sami affairs, horticulture, animal welfare, foodstuffs, hunting and game management, as well as higher education and research in the field of agricultural sciences.

== History ==
The office was founded in 1900 under the name of minister of agriculture. Its first holder was Theodor Odelberg. The office was renamed minister for agriculture, food and fisheries in the 1990s. The office was renamed minister for rural affairs (landsbygdsminister) in 2010.

== List of ministers ==
=== Agriculture (1900–2010) ===
No.	Portrait	Minister	Took office	Left office	Time in office	Party	Cabinet
1	Theodor Odelsberg	Theodor Odelsberg (1847–1938)	31 March 1900	2 August 1905	5 years, 124 days	Moderate	Boström I von Otter; Boström II; Ramstedt
2	Alfred Petersson	Alfred Petersson (1860–1920)	2 August 1905	7 November 1905	97 days	Electoral League	Lundeberg
3	Gösta Tamm	Gösta Tamm (1866–1931)	7 November 1905	29 May 1906	203 days	Free-minded	Staaff I
(2)	Alfred Petersson	Alfred Petersson (1860–1920)	29 May 1906	17 March 1909	2 years, 292 days	Electoral League	Lindman I
4	Oscar Nylander	Oscar Nylander (1853–1920)	17 March 1909	7 October 1911	2 years, 204 days	Electoral League	Lindman I
(2)	Alfred Petersson	Alfred Petersson (1860–1920)	7 October 1911	17 February 1914	2 years, 133 days	Free-minded	Staaff II
5	Johan Beck-Friis	Johan Beck-Friis (1862–1929)	17 February 1914	30 March 1917	3 years, 41 days	Independent	Hammarskjöld
6	Knut Dahlberg	Knut Dahlberg (1877–1949)	30 March 1917	19 October 1917	203 days	Electoral League	Swartz
(2)	Alfred Petersson	Alfred Petersson (1860–1920)	19 October 1917	10 March 1920	2 years, 143 days	Free-minded	Edén
7	Olof Nilsson	Olof Nilsson (1863–1928)	10 March 1920	27 October 1920	231 days	Social Democrats	Branting I
8	Nils Hansson	Nils Hansson (1867–1945)	27 October 1920	13 October 1921	351 days	Independent	De Geer von Sydow
9	Sven Linders	Sven Linders (1873–1932)	13 October 1921	19 April 1923	1 year, 188 days	Social Democrats	Branting II
10	David Pettersson	David Pettersson (1866–1957)	19 April 1923	18 October 1924	1 year, 182 days	Electoral League	Trygger
(9)	Sven Linders	Sven Linders (1873–1932)	18 October 1924	7 June 1926	1 year, 232 days	Social Democrats	Branting III; Sandler
11	Paul Hellström	Paul Hellström (1866–1927)	7 June 1926	3 July 1927	1 year, 26 days	Free-minded	Ekman I
12	Bo von Stockenström	Bo von Stockenström (1887–1962)	12 July 1927	2 October 1928	1 year, 82 days	Free-minded	Ekman I
13	Johan Bernhard Johansson	Johan Bernhard Johansson (1877–1949)	2 October 1928	7 June 1930	1 year, 248 days	Electoral League	Lindman II
(12)	Bo von Stockenström	Bo von Stockenström (1887–1962)	7 June 1930	24 September 1932	2 years, 109 days	Free-minded	Ekman II; Hamrin
14	Per Edvin Sköld	Per Edvin Sköld (1891–1972)	24 September 1932	19 June 1936	3 years, 269 days	Social Democrats	Hansson I
15	Axel Pehrsson-Bramstorp	Axel Pehrsson-Bramstorp (1883–1954)	19 June 1936	31 July 1945	9 years, 42 days	Centre	Pehrsson-Bramstorp; Hansson II; Hansson III
(14)	Per Edvin Sköld	Per Edvin Sköld (1891–1972)	31 July 1945	29 October 1948	3 years, 90 days	Social Democrats	Hansson IV; Erlander I
16	Gunnar Sträng	Gunnar Sträng (1906–1992)	29 October 1948	1 October 1951	2 years, 337 days	Social Democrats	Erlander I
17	Sam B. Norup	Sam B. Norup (1896–1973)	1 October 1951	1 February 1957	5 years, 123 days	Centre	Erlander II
18	Bernhard Näsgård	Bernhard Näsgård (1891–1957)	1 February 1957	8 July 1957	157 days	Centre	Erlander II
19	Nils G. Hansson	Nils G. Hansson (1902–1981)	29 July 1957	31 October 1957	94 days	Centre	Erlander II
20	Gösta Netzén	Gösta Netzén (1908–1984)	31 October 1957	24 November 1961	4 years, 24 days	Social Democrats	Erlander III
21	Eric Holmquist	Eric Holmquist (1917–2009)	24 November 1961	24 January 1969	7 years, 61 days	Social Democrats	Erlander III
22	Ingemund Bengtsson	Ingemund Bengtsson (1919–2000)	25 January 1969	3 November 1973	4 years, 282 days	Social Democrats	Erlander III; Palme I
23	Svante Lundkvist	Svante Lundkvist (1919–1991)	3 November 1973	8 October 1976	2 years, 340 days	Social Democrats	Palme I
24	Anders Dahlgren	Anders Dahlgren (1925–1986)	8 October 1976	18 October 1978	2 years, 10 days	Centre	Fälldin I
25	Eric Enlund	Eric Enlund (1918–2011)	18 October 1978	12 October 1979	359 days	Liberals	Ullsten
(24)	Anders Dahlgren	Anders Dahlgren (1925–1986)	12 October 1979	4 October 1982	2 years, 357 days	Centre	Fälldin II; Fälldin III
–	Claes Elmstedt	Claes Elmstedt (1928–2018); Acting	4 October 1982	8 October 1982	4 days	Centre	Fälldin III
(23)	Svante Lundkvist	Svante Lundkvist (1919–1991)	8 October 1982	10 October 1986	4 years, 2 days	Social Democrats	Palme II; Carlsson I
26	Mats Hellström	Mats Hellström (1942–2026)	10 October 1986	4 October 1991	4 years, 359 days	Social Democrats	Carlsson I Carlsson II
27	Karl Erik Olsson	Karl Erik Olsson (1938–2021)	4 October 1991	7 October 1994	3 years, 3 days	Centre	Bildt
28	Margareta Winberg	Margareta Winberg (born 1947)	7 October 1994	22 March 1996	1 year, 167 days	Social Democrats	Carlsson III
29	Annika Åhnberg	Annika Åhnberg (1949–2025)	22 March 1996	7 October 1998	2 years, 199 days	Social Democrats	Persson
(28)	Margareta Winberg	Margareta Winberg (born 1947)	7 October 1998	21 October 2002	4 years, 14 days	Social Democrats	Persson
30	Ann-Christin Nykvist	Ann-Christin Nykvist (born 1948)	21 October 2002	6 October 2006	3 years, 350 days	Social Democrats	Persson
31	Eskil Erlandsson	Eskil Erlandsson (born 1957)	6 October 2006	5 October 2010	3 years, 364 days	Centre	Reinfeldt

=== Rural affairs (2010–2021) ===
No.	Portrait	Minister (Born–Died)	Tenure			Political party	Cabinet
No.	Portrait	Minister (Born–Died)	Took office	Left office	Duration	Political party	Cabinet
1		Eskil Erlandsson (1957–)	5 October 2010	3 October 2014	3 years, 363 days	Centre	Reinfeldt
2		Sven-Erik Bucht (born 1954)	3 October 2014	21 January 2019	4 years, 110 days	Social Democrats	Löfven (I)
3		Jennie Nilsson (1972–)	21 January 2019	30 June 2021	2 years, 160 days	Social Democrats	Löfven (II)
-		Ibrahim Baylan (acting) (1972–)	30 June 2021	9 July 2021	9 days	Social Democrats	Löfven (II)

=== Responsibility for rural affairs (2021) ===
No.	Portrait	Minister (Born–Died)	Tenure			Political party	Title	Cabinet
No.	Portrait	Minister (Born–Died)	Took office	Left office	Duration	Political party	Title	Cabinet
		Ibrahim Baylan (1972–)	9 July 2021	30 November 2021	144 days	Social Democrats	Minister for Business, Industry and Innovation	Löfven (III)

=== Rural affairs (2021–) ===
No.	Portrait	Minister (Born–Died)	Tenure			Political party	Cabinet
No.	Portrait	Minister (Born–Died)	Took office	Left office	Duration	Political party	Cabinet
4		Anna-Caren Sätherberg (1964–)	30 November 2021	18 October 2022	322 days	Social Democrats	Andersson
5		Peter Kullgren (1981–)	18 October 2022	Incumbent	4 years, 16 days	Christian Democrats	Kristersson
