= Minister for Rural Affairs =

Minister for Rural Affairs may refer to:

- Cabinet Secretary for Rural Affairs, Land Reform and Islands, a Scottish Government position
- Minister for Rural Affairs (Sweden), a Swedish Government position
- Minister for Rural Affairs (Wales), a Welsh Government position
- Minister for Rural Affairs (New South Wales), former New South Wales Government ministry
