= Axel Rubbestad =

Swedish politician (1888–1961)

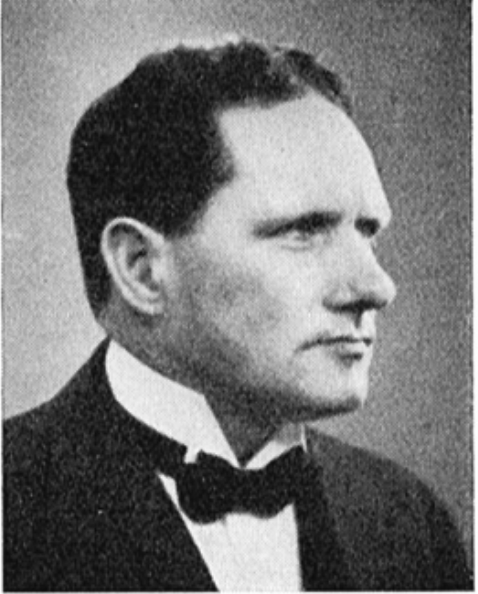

Minister of Civil Affairs (Minister without portfolio)
- In office 1943 – October 1944
- Prime Minister: Per Albin Hansson
- Preceded by: Post established
- Succeeded by: Tage Erlander

Minister of Fuel (Minister without portfolio)
- In office October 1944 – July 1945
- Prime Minister: Per Albin Hansson
- Preceded by: Fritiof Domö
- Succeeded by: John Ericsson i Kinna

Personal details
- Born: Axel Hansson; 2 October 1888 Färgelanda, Sweden
- Died: 6 August 1961 (aged 72) Färgelanda, Sweden
- Party: Farmers' League

Axel Rubbestad (2 October 1888 - 6 August 1961) was a Swedish farmer and politician. He represented the Farmers' League (currently the Centre Party) in the lower house of the Swedish bicameral parliament between 1933 and 1959, and he was a minister without portfolio in the coalition government headed by Per Albin Hansson which governed the country during World War 2. Rubbestad was Minister of Civil Affairs in 1943–44, and then Minister of Fuel from October 1944 until the government was dissolved in July 1945.

== Biography ==
Rubbestad was born as Axel Hansson in Ödeborg in Dalsland, which then belonged to Älvsborg County, as the eleventh of twelve siblings. He went to school in Uddevalla and Gothenburg, and intended to become a clergyman; for health reasons he was not able to finish his studies, and he became a tenant farmer at the estate Rubbestad near Ödeborg. In 1936 he moved to Vrine, another farm in the same area.

When Axel Hansson became a member of Parliament in 1933, there were several other members called Hansson. Conforming to the convention in the Swedish parliament, he added the name of his home to his name, and went by "Axel Hansson in Rubbestad". When he became a government minister he legally changed his last name in order to avoid being confused with the Prime Minister, Per Albin Hansson.

He married Augusta Johansson (1894-1971) in 1914.

== Political stance ==
Rubbestad had a conservative outlook and frequently argued in favour of frugality and against public spending. He was an opponent of higher education, he believed that married women should not work outside the home, and he did not approve of public funding for secular cultural purposes such as the Royal Swedish Opera. He had an isolationist stance during the war, and argued against Sweden's joining the United Nations. In 1951, he demanded that the author Vilhelm Moberg should be sentenced to two years in prison, due to a scene in his novel The Emigrants where a prostitute identifies a church warden as one of her former clients.

Towards the end of his political career he disagreed more and more frequently with the other Farmers' League MPs: he was a vocal opponent of the ordination of women within the Church of Sweden, he argued against the proposed switch to right-hand driving, and he was negative to the Farmers' League being in government together with the Social Democrats between 1951 and 1957.

His great-grandson, Michael Rubbestad, is a musician, former child actor and followed him as an Member of the Riksdag between 2018 and 2026, representing the Sweden Democrats.
