= Hansson IV cabinet =

Government of Sweden from 1945 to 1946

- Cabinet of Sweden

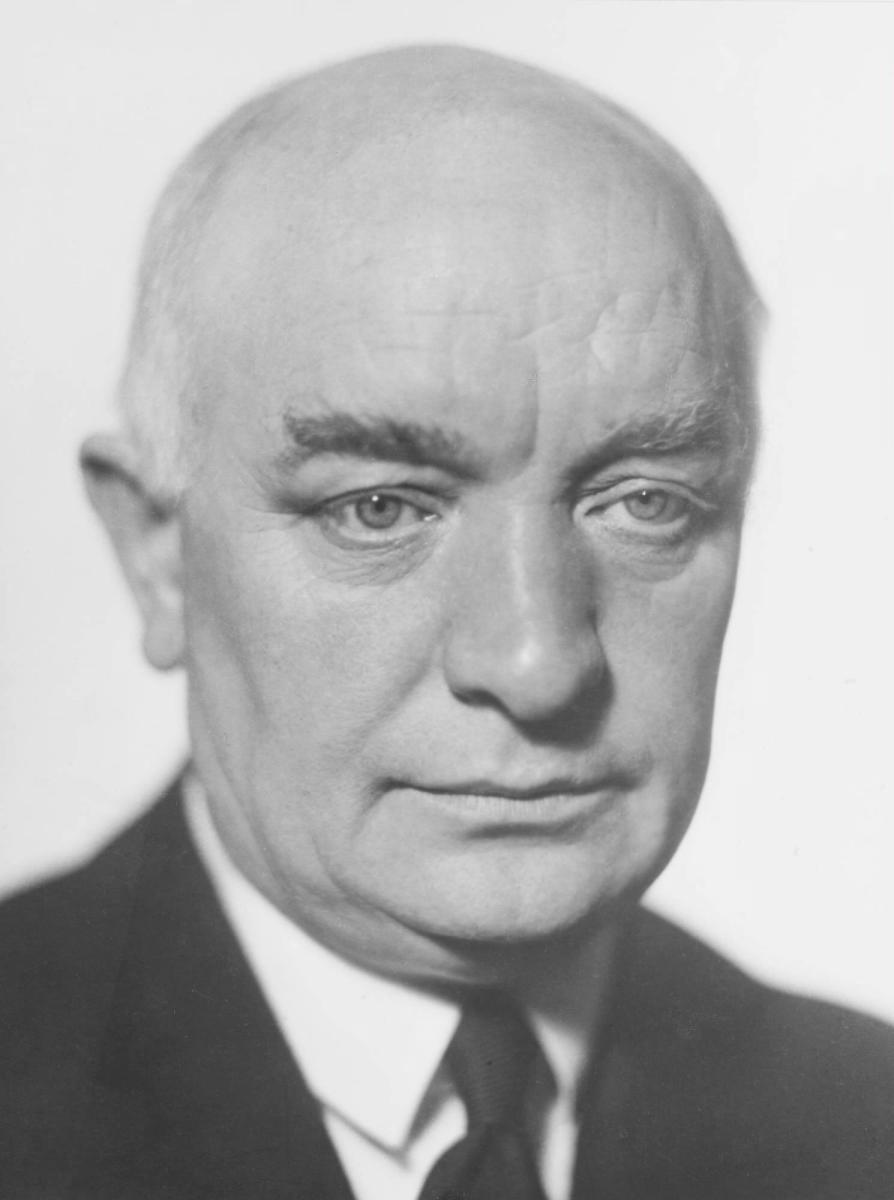
- Prime Minister Per Albin Hansson
- Date formed: 31 July 1945
- Date dissolved: 11 October 1946

People and organisations
- Head of state: Gustaf V
- Head of government: Per Albin Hansson
- Member party: Social Democrats
- Status in legislature: Single-party majority (upper house); Single-party minority (lower house)
- Opposition parties: National Organization of the Right; Farmers' League; People's Party; Communist Party of Sweden

History
- Incoming formation: End of World War II
- Outgoing formation: Passing of Per Albin Hansson
- Election: 1944 election
- Predecessor: Hansson III cabinet
- Successor: Erlander I cabinet

The Hansson IV cabinet (Swedish: regeringen Hansson IV) was the government of Sweden from 31 July 1945 to 11 October 1946. It was a Social Democratic single-party government led by Prime Minister Per Albin Hansson, until his death on 6 October 1946.

The cabinet succeeded the national unity Hansson III cabinet, which had ruled during World War II. It dissolved as a consequence of the passing of Hansson and was replaced by the likewise Social Democratic Erlander I cabinet. During the days between Hansson's passing and the new government's inauguration, Minister for Foreign Affairs Östen Undén served as acting prime minister.

== Ministers ==
The cabinet consisted of 16 ministers who were all members of the Social Democrats.

Portfolio	Name	
Prime Minister	Per Albin Hansson	
Minister for Justice	Herman Zetterberg	
Minister for Foreign Affairs	Östen Undén	
Minister for Defence	Allan Vougt	
Minister for Social Affairs	Gustav Möller	
Minister for Communications	Torsten Nilsson	
Minister for Finance	Ernst Wigforss	
Minister of Education and Ecclesiastical Affairs	Tage Erlander	
Minister for Agriculture	Per Edvin Sköld	
Minister of Commerce and Industry	Gunnar Myrdal	
Minister of Supply	Axel Gjöres	
Deputy Ministers (Ministers without a portfolio)
Deputy Minister	Gunnar Danielson	
Deputy Minister	Nils Quensel	(opol.)
Deputy Minister for Social Affairs	Eije Mossberg	
Deputy Minister for Agriculture	Gunnar Sträng	
Minister for Fuel	John Ericsson i Kinna	

Preceded by Hansson III cabinet	Government of Sweden; 1945–1946	Succeeded by Erlander I cabinet
