= 1952 Swedish general election =

← 1948	21 September 1952	1956 →

All 230 seats in the Andra kammaren of the Riksdag 116 seats needed for a majority
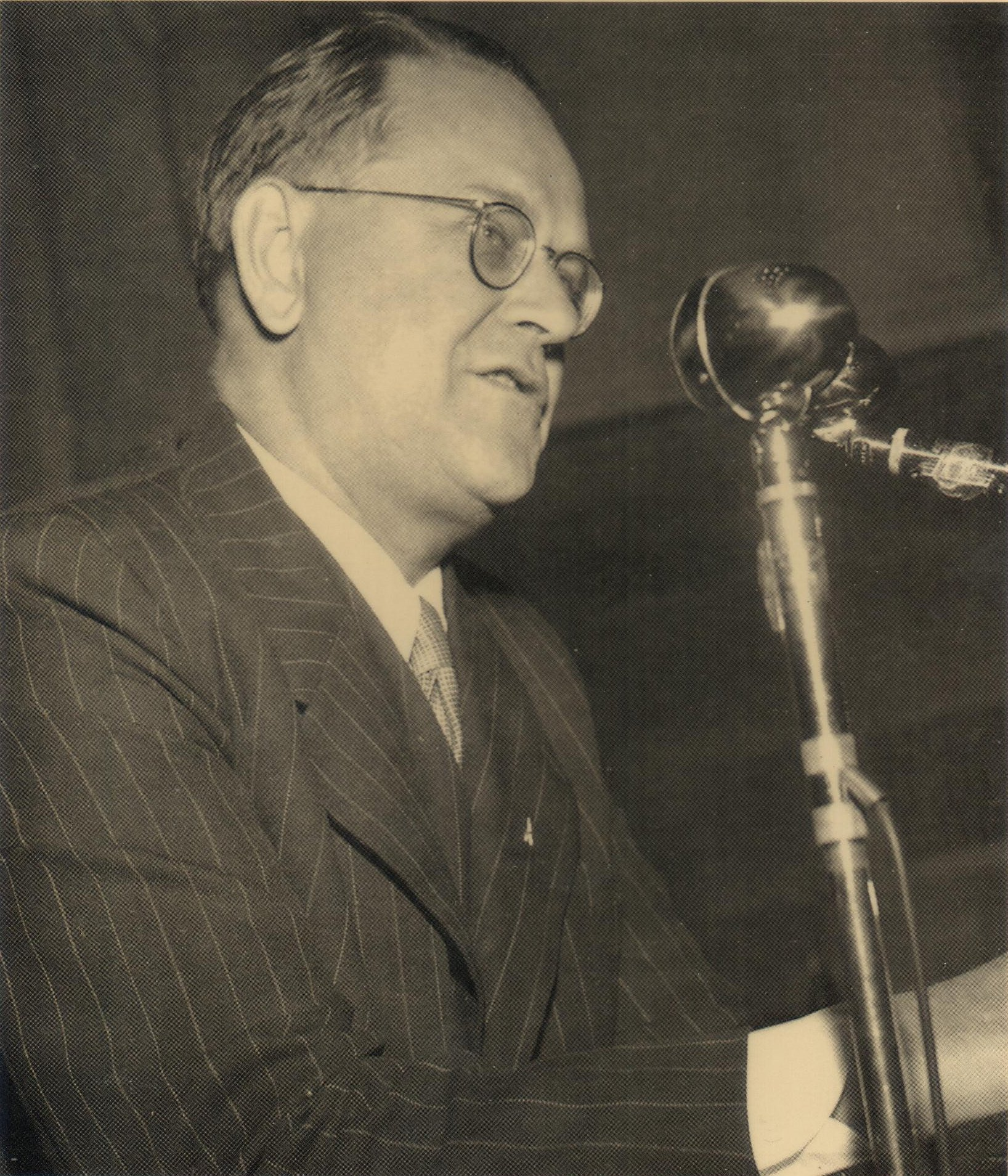

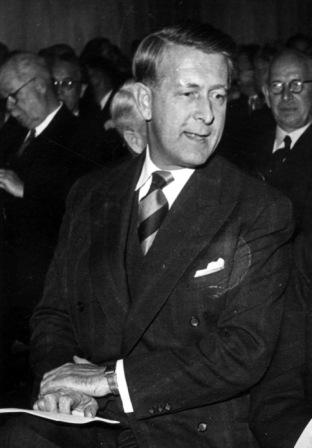

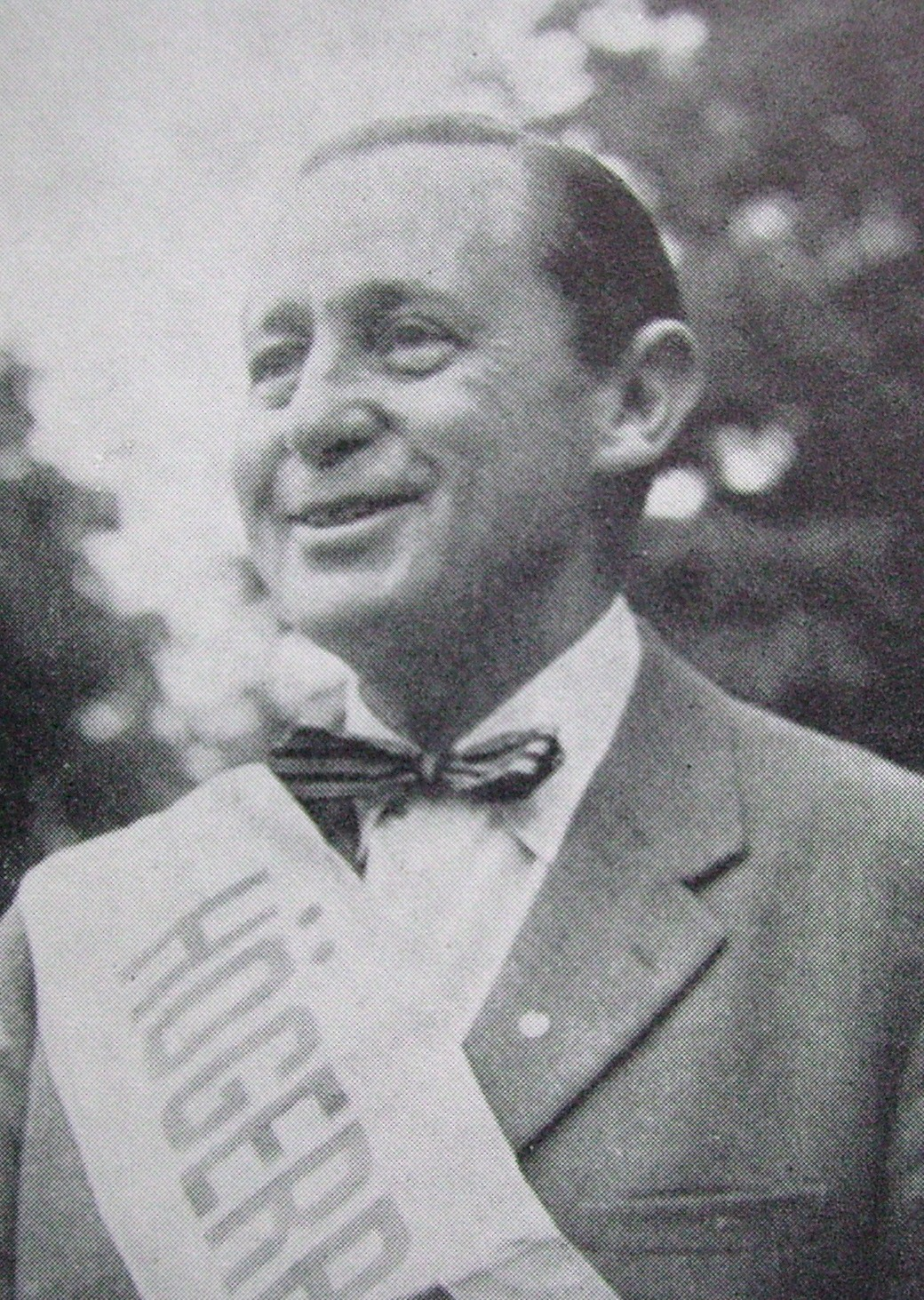

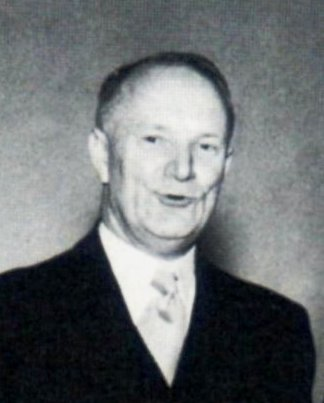

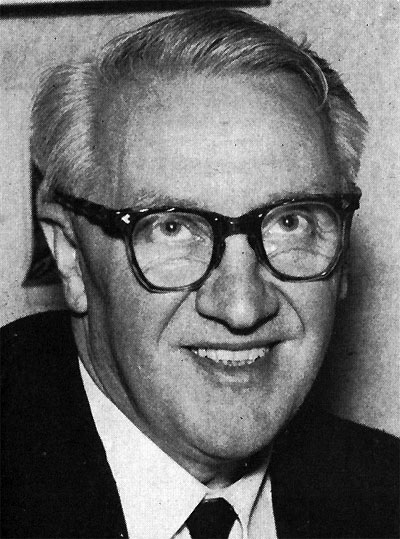
	First party	Second party	Third party
Leader	Tage Erlander	Bertil Ohlin	Jarl Hjalmarson
Party	Social Democrats	People's Party	Right Party
Last election	112	57	23
Seats won	110	58	31
Seat change	▼2	▲1	▲8
Popular vote	1,742,284	924,819	543,825
Percentage	46.05%	24.44%	14.37%
	Fourth party	Fifth party
Leader	Gunnar Hedlund	Hilding Hagberg
Party	Farmers' League	Communist
Last election	30	8
Seats won	26	5
Seat change	▼4	▼3
Popular vote	406,183	164,194
Percentage	10.74%	4.34%
- Largest bloc and seats won by constituency
Prime Minister before election
Tage Erlander
Social Democrats
Elected Prime Minister
Tage Erlander
Social Democrats

General elections were held in Sweden on 21 September 1952. The Social Democrats remained the largest party with 110 of the 230 seats in the Andra kammaren of the Riksdag and together with the Communist Party of Sweden they got 115 seats and the other parties 115 seats. Tage Erlander and his Social Democratic Party did however form his second government with the Farmers' League already in 1951 and together with that party the Social Democrats now had a majority of 136 seats in the chamber and together with the Communists 141 seats. In the other indirectly elected chamber the Social Democrats had an absolute majority.

The Catalina affair had taken place a few months prior to the election and was highly debated during the time.

== Results ==
Party	Votes	%	Seats	+/–
Swedish Social Democratic Party	1,742,284	46.05	110	–2
People's Party	924,819	24.44	58	+1
Right Party	543,825	14.37	31	+8
Farmers' League	406,183	10.74	26	–4
Communist Party	164,194	4.34	5	–3
Left Socialist Party	2,302	0.06	0	0
Other parties	100	0.00	0	0
Total	3,783,707	100.00	230	0
Valid votes	3,783,707	99.54		
Invalid/blank votes	17,577	0.46		
Total votes	3,801,284	100.00		
Registered voters/turnout	4,805,216	79.11		
Source: Nohlen & Stöver
