= Karl Johan Alfred Gustafsson =

Swedish politician (1862–1936)

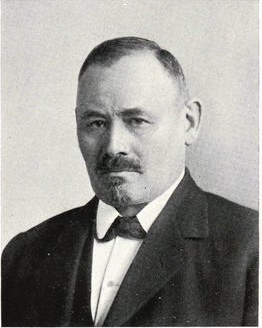
Karljohanalfredgustafssonn

Karl Johan Alfred Gustafsson (1862–1936) was a Swedish politician. He was a member of the Högerpartiet (today's Moderate Party).

== Overview ==
Gustafsson was a member of the Riksdag's first chamber 1909–1933, always elected by Jönköping County constituency.

Gustafsson received the North Star Order. He was the father of Fritiof Domö, Elin Hakeman, Lennart Gustafsson and Gunnar Hakeman, all politicians for Högerpartiet.
