= 1948 Swedish general election =

← 1944	19 September 1948	1952 →

All 230 seats in the Andra kammaren of the Riksdag 116 seats needed for a majority
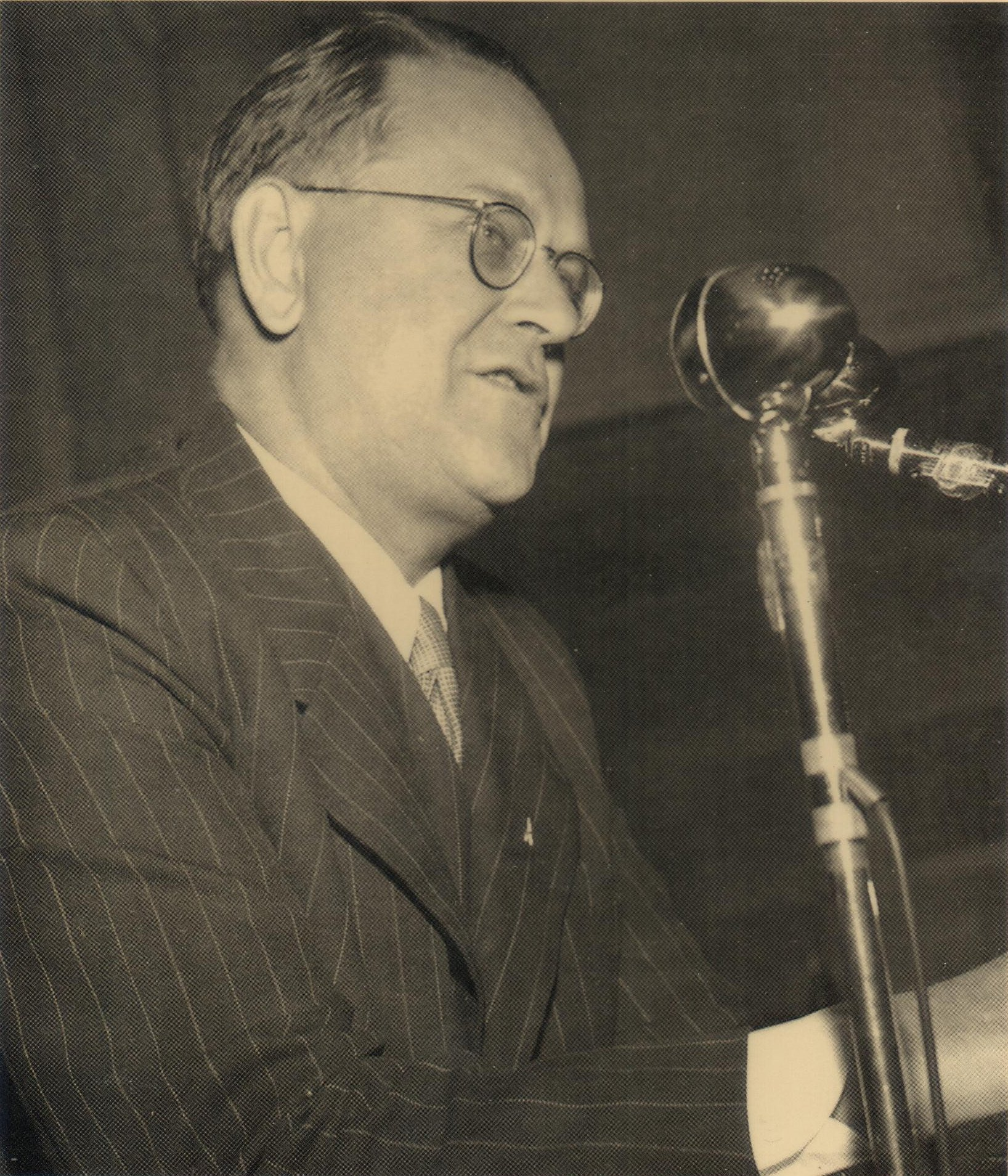

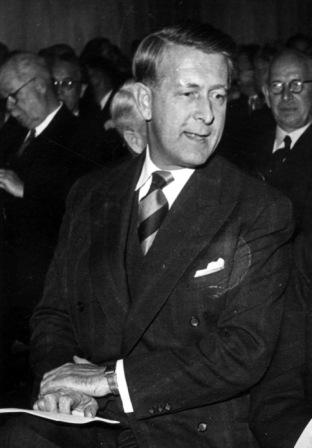

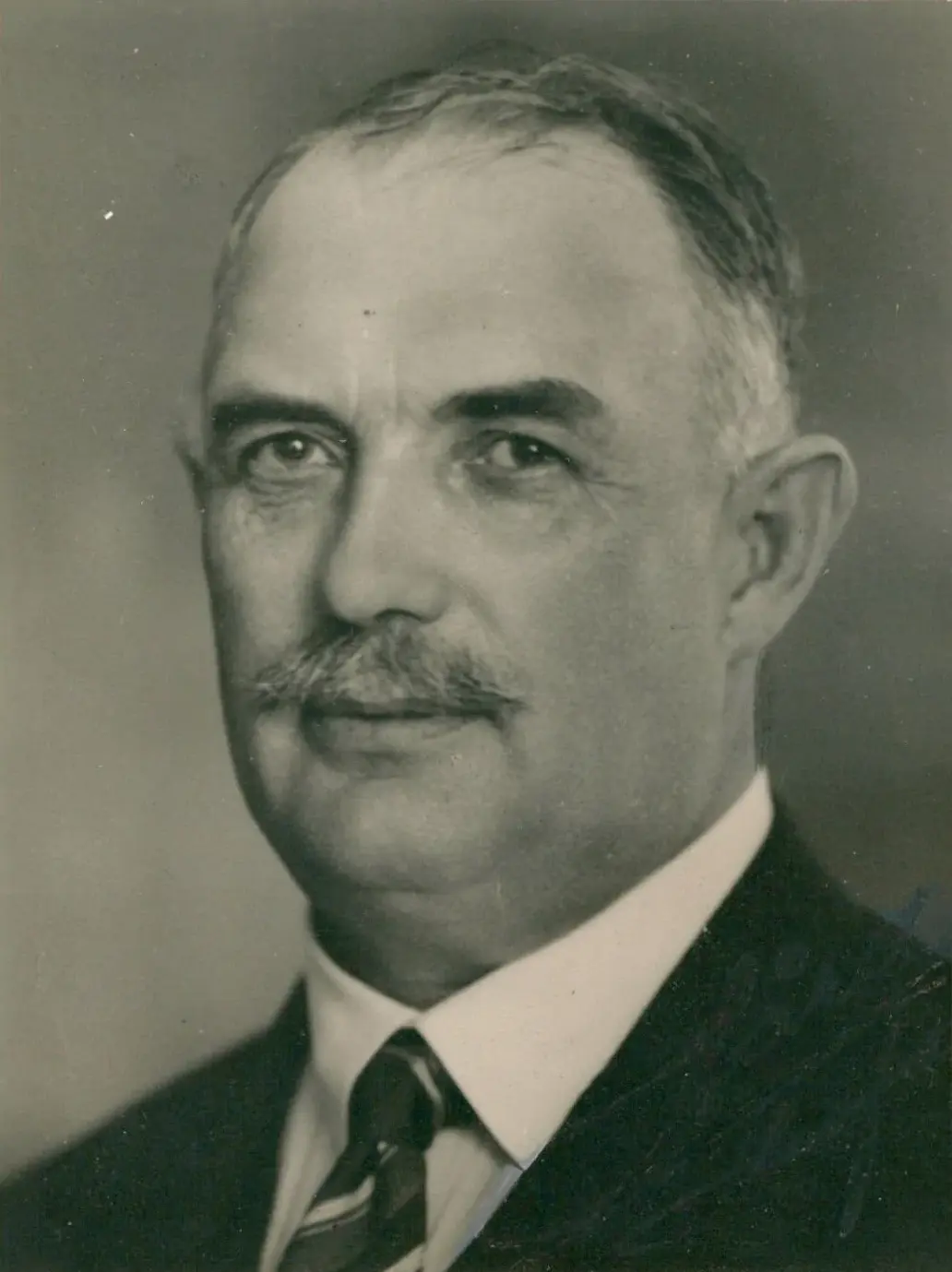

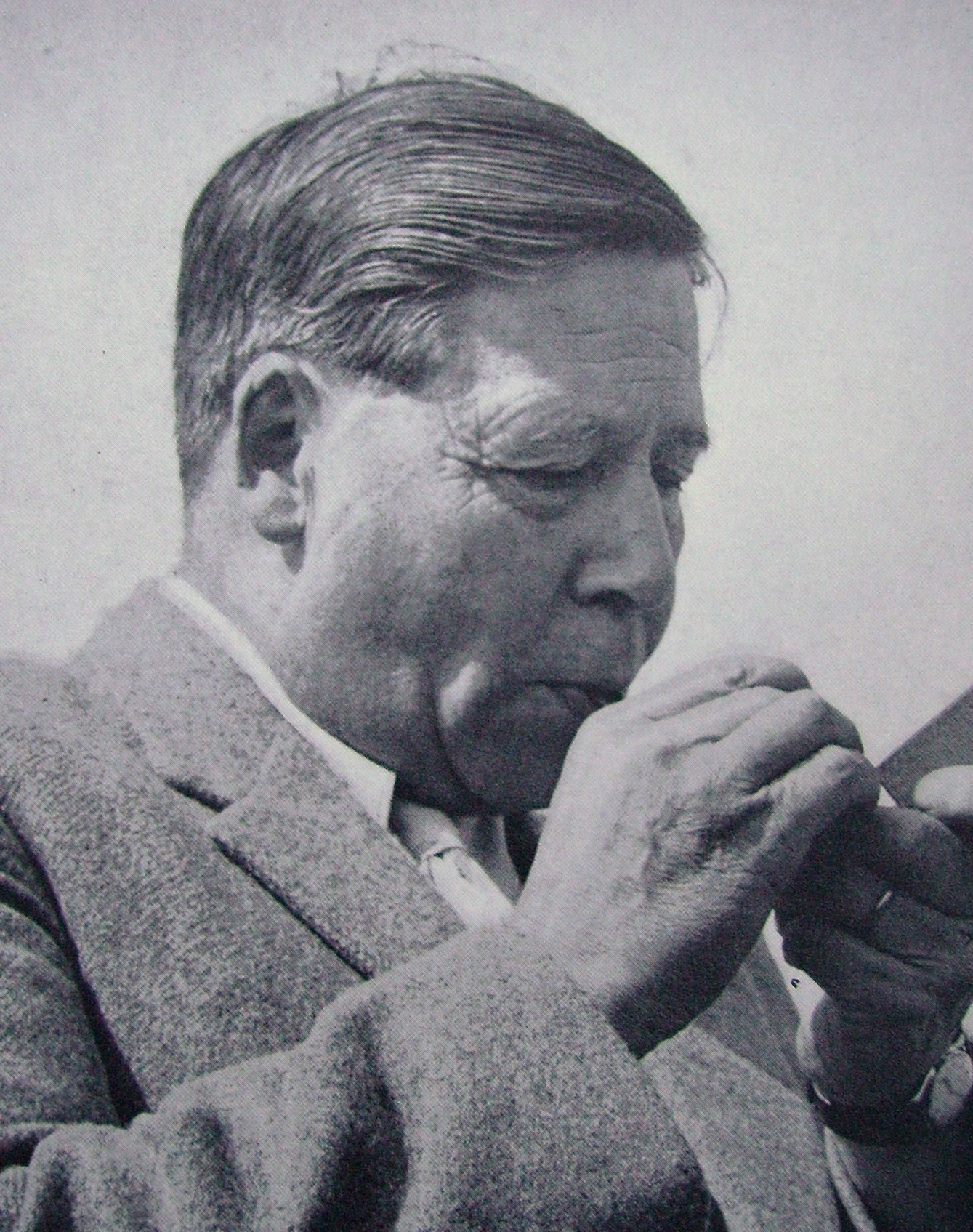

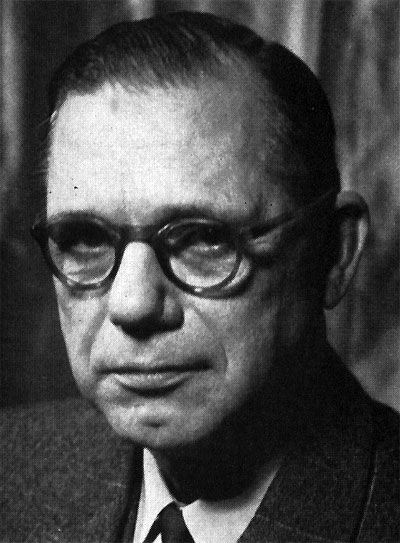
	First party	Second party	Third party
Leader	Tage Erlander	Bertil Ohlin	Axel Pehrsson-Bramstorp
Party	Social Democrats	People's Party	Farmers' League
Last election	115	26	35
Seats won	112	57	30
Seat change	▼3	▲31	▼5
Popular vote	1,789,459	882,437	480,421
Percentage	46.1%	22.7%	12.4%
	Fourth party	Fifth party
Leader	Fritiof Domö	Sven Linderot
Party	Right	Communist
Last election	39	15
Seats won	23	8
Seat change	▼16	▼7
Popular vote	478,786	244,826
Percentage	12.3%	6.3%
- Largest bloc and seats won by constituency
PM before election
Tage Erlander
Social Democrats
Elected PM
Tage Erlander
Social Democrats

General elections were held in Sweden on 19 September 1948. Despite a campaign by a large part of the Swedish press against socializing insurances, controlled foreign trade and rationing regulations still in use since the war, freshman Prime Minister and Social Democratic leader Tage Erlander managed to defeat the People's Party-led opposition under Bertil Ohlin by a higher election turnout. He maintained his government with only minor losses and the Swedish Social Democratic Party remained the largest party, winning 112 of the 230 seats in the Andra kammaren of the Riksdag. Erlander was to stay on as Prime Minister until 1969.

The election has been described as "one of the fiercest ever" by Rikard Westerberg. The election dealt mostly with the freedom of the business community. Tage Erlander described the ferocity of the election in his memoirs, writing, "the political battle also became more focused on individuals than we were used to in Sweden. And it was crazy personal attacks!". According to Westerberg, the block opposing the social democrats thought the Social democrats will tighten control over business freedoms, will lead to mismangment and "economic dictatorship". The social democrats accused the opposition head, Bertil Ohlin of being a servant to the business community.

Westerberg writes that the election was also defined by Russian expansionism as the Russian backed communists seized power through a coup d'état in Czechoslovakia in February 1948, while Sweden declared neutrality in the Cold war the very same month. At the same time, the Swedish economy was enjoying significant expansion thanks to American investment through the Marshall plan.

== Results ==
Party	Votes	%	Seats	+/–
Swedish Social Democratic Party	1,789,459	46.13	112	–3
People's Party	882,437	22.75	57	+31
Farmers' League	480,421	12.39	30	–5
National Organisation of the Right	478,786	12.34	23	–16
Communist Party	244,826	6.31	8	–7
Left Socialist Party	2,943	0.08	0	0
Other parties	119	0.00	0	0
Total	3,878,991	100.00	230	0
Valid votes	3,878,991	99.58		
Invalid/blank votes	16,170	0.42		
Total votes	3,895,161	100.00		
Registered voters/turnout	4,707,783	82.74		
Source: Nohlen & Stöver, SCB
