= Hansson III cabinet =

Swedish government between December 1939 and July 1945

Third Cabinet of Hansson
- Cabinet of Sweden

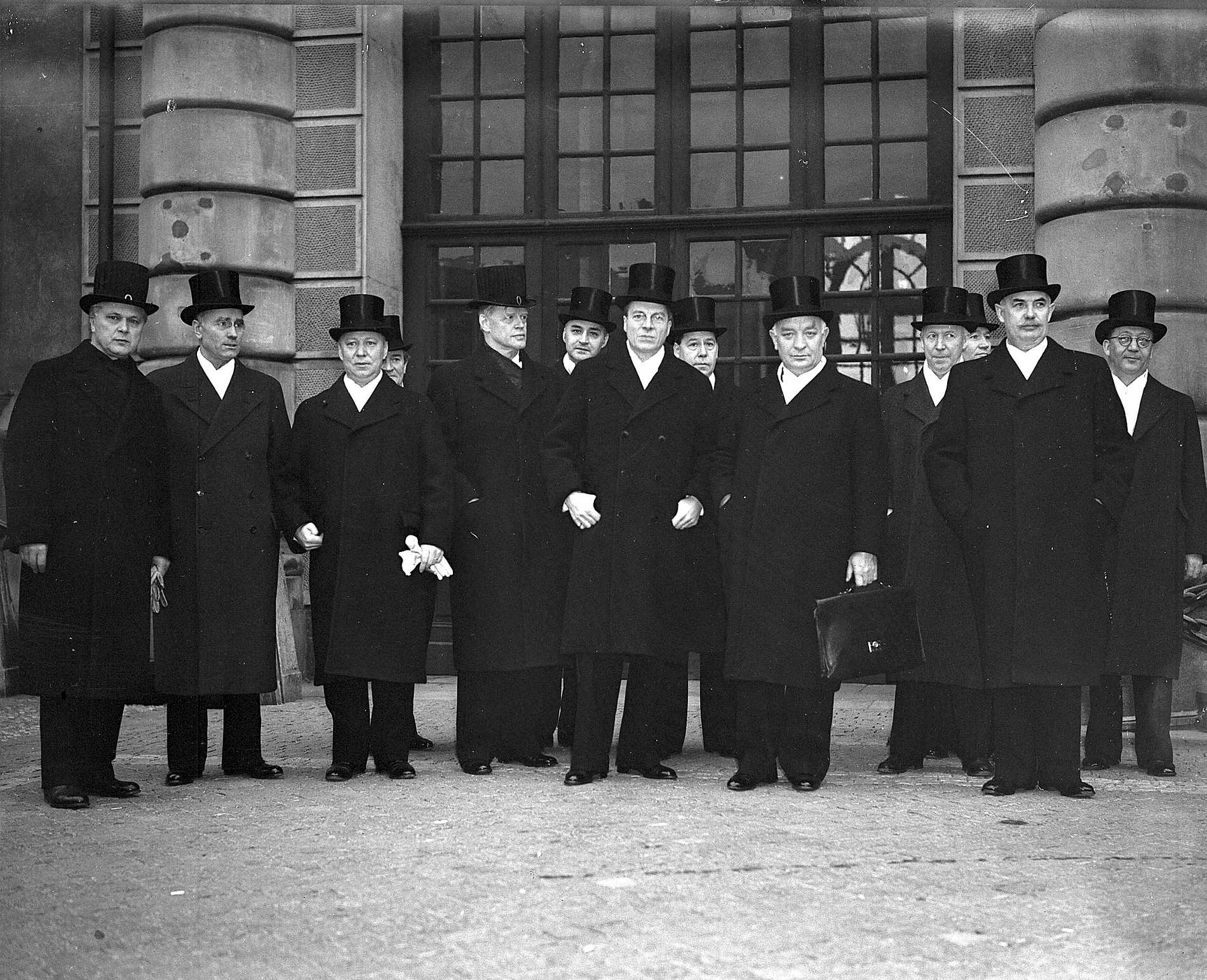
- The newly formed government assembled at Stockholm Palace in December 1939. From left to right: Bagge, Andersson, Bergquist, Möller, Westman, Quensel, Günther, Domö, Hansson (carrying a briefcase), Wigforss, Sköld, Pehrsson-Bramstorp, Eriksson.
- Date formed: 13 December 1939
- Date dissolved: 31 July 1945

People and organisations
- Head of state: Gustaf V
- Head of government: Per Albin Hansson
- Member parties: Social Democrats; National Organization of the Right; Farmers' League; People's Party
- Status in legislature: National unity majority (upper & lower house)
- Opposition parties: Socialist Party (until 1940); Communist Party of Sweden

History
- Incoming formation: Outbreak of the Winter War
- Outgoing formation: End of World War II
- Elections: 1940 election 1944 election
- Predecessor: Hansson II cabinet
- Successor: Hansson IV cabinet

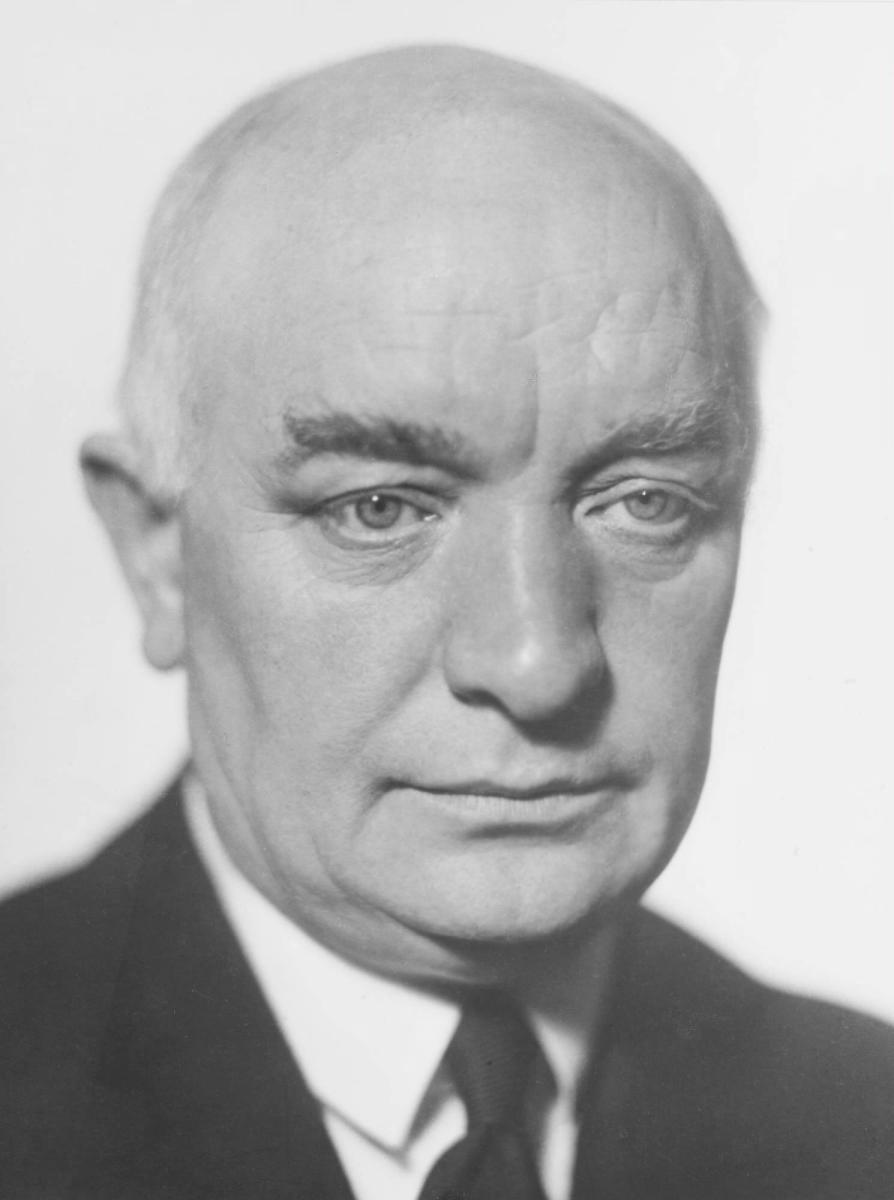
Prime Minister Per Albin Hansson.

The Hansson III cabinet (Swedish: regeringen Hansson III) was the government of Sweden from 13 December 1939 to 31 July 1945. It was a national unity majority government between the four largest parties in the Riksdag (Swedish parliament): the Social Democrats, the National Organization of the Right, the Farmers' League, and the People's Party, led by Prime Minister Per Albin Hansson of the Social Democrats.

The cabinet was formed for reasons of national stability during World War II. Two parties in the Riksdag were kept out of the cabinet: the pro-Soviet Communist Party of Sweden and the Socialist Party, which veered between communist and Nazi positions, and lost its parliamentary representation in the 1940 general election. After the end of World War II, the cabinet was dissolved and replaced by a cabinet consisting only of Social Democratic ministers: Hansson IV.

== Ministers ==
Portfolio	Minister	Took office	Left office	Party
Prime Minister's Office
Prime Minister, Head of the Prime Minister's Office	Per Albin Hansson	13 December 1939	31 July 1945	Social Democrats
Ministry of Justice
Minister for Justice, Head of the Ministry of Justice	Karl Gustaf Westman	13 December 1939	30 August 1943	Centre
Minister for Justice, Head of the Ministry of Justice	Thorwald Bergquist	30 August 1943	31 July 1945	People's Party
Ministry for Foreign Affairs
Minister for Foreign Affairs, Head of the Ministry for Foreign Affairs	Christian Günther	13 December 1939	31 July 1945	Independent
Ministry of Defence
Minister for Defence, Head of the Ministry of Defence	Per Edvin Sköld	13 December 1939	31 July 1945	Social Democrats
Ministry of Health and Social Affairs
Minister for Health and Social Affairs, Head of the Ministry of Health and Social Affairs	Gustav Möller	13 December 1939	31 July 1945	Social Democrats
Ministry of Communications
Minister of Communications, Head of the Ministry of Communications	Gustaf Andersson in Rasjön	13 December 1939	30 September 1944	People's Party
Minister of Communications, Head of the Ministry of Communications	Fritiof Domö	30 September 1944	31 July 1945	Moderate
Ministry of Finance
Minister for Finance, Head of the Ministry of Finance	Ernst Wigforss	13 December 1939	31 July 1945	Social Democrats
Ministry of Education and Ecclesiastical Affairs
Minister of Education and Ecclesiastical Affairs, Head of the Ministry of Education and Ecclesiastical Affairs	Gösta Bagge	13 December 1939	15 December 1944	Moderate
Minister of Education and Ecclesiastical Affairs, Head of the Ministry of Education and Ecclesiastical Affairs	Georg Andrén	15 December 1944	31 July 1945	Moderate
Ministry of Agriculture
Minister for Agriculture, Head of the Ministry of Agriculture	Axel Pehrsson-Bramstorp	13 December 1939	31 July 1945	Centre
Ministry of Commerce and Industry
Minister of Commerce and Industry, Head of the Ministry of Commerce and Industry	Fritiof Domö	13 December 1939	7 March 1941	Moderate
Minister of Commerce and Industry, Head of the Ministry of Commerce and Industry	Herman Eriksson	7 March 1941	30 September 1944	Social Democrats
Minister of Commerce and Industry, Head of the Ministry of Commerce and Industry	Bertil Ohlin	30 September 1944	31 July 1945	People's Party
Ministry of Supply
Minister of Supply, Head of the Ministry of Supply	Herman Eriksson	13 December 1939	7 March 1941	Social Democrats
Minister of Supply, Head of the Ministry of Supply	Axel Gjöres	7 March 1941	31 July 1945	Social Democrats
Ministers without portfolio
Law consult	Nils Quensel	13 December 1939	11 October 1940	Independent
Law consult	Edgar Rosander	11 October 1940	30 September 1944	Independent
Law consult	Gunnar Danielson	30 September 1944	31 July 1945	Social Democrats
Law consult	Thorwald Bergquist	13 December 1939	30 August 1943	People's Party
Law consult	Nils Quensel	30 August 1943	31 July 1945	Independent
Minister of Fuel	Fritiof Domö	7 March 1941	30 September 1944	Moderate
Minister of Fuel	Axel Rubbestad	30 September 1944	31 July 1945	Centre
Minister without of portfolio in questions regarding Ministry of Finance and Ministry of Defence	Knut G. Ewerlöf	7 March 1941	31 July 1945	Moderate
Minister of Civil Defence	Axel Rubbestad	30 August 1943	30 September 1944	Centre
Minister of Civil Defence and Deputy Minister for Health and Social Affairs	Tage Erlander	30 September 1944	31 July 1945	Social Democrats

Preceded by Hansson II cabinet	Cabinet of Sweden; 1939–1945	Succeeded by Hansson IV cabinet
