= Anna-Caren Sätherberg =

Swedish politician (born 1964)

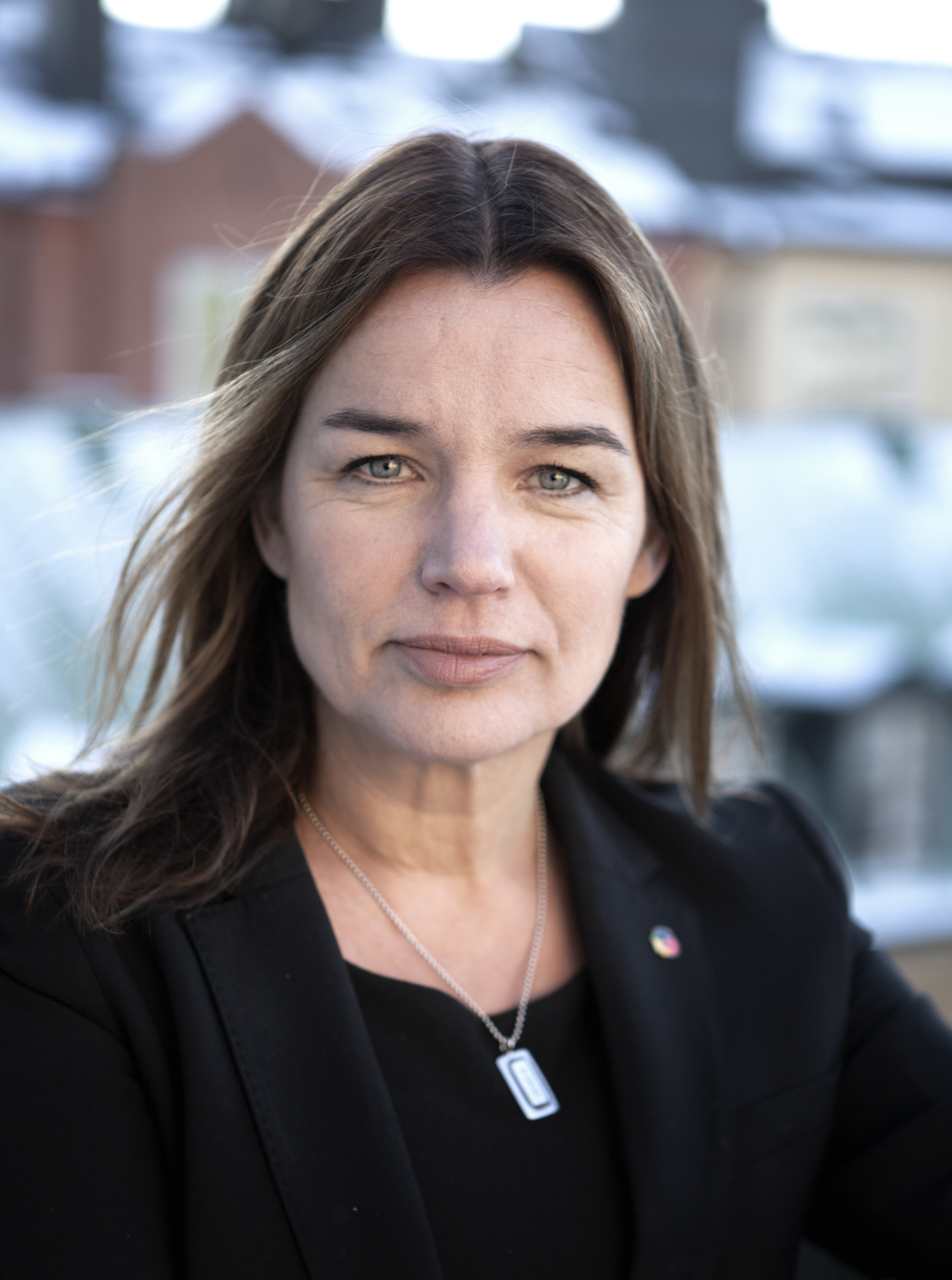

Minister for Rural Affairs
- In office 30 November 2021 – 18 October 2022
- Monarch: Carl XVI Gustaf
- Prime Minister: Magdalena Andersson
- Preceded by: Ibrahim Baylan (July 2021)
- Succeeded by: Peter Kullgren

Member of the Riksdag
- Incumbent
- Assumed office 29 September 2014
- Constituency: Jämtland County

Personal details
- Born: 5 October 1964 (age 61)
- Party: Social Democrats

Anna-Caren Sätherberg (born 5 October 1964) is a Swedish politician. She served as minister for rural affairs in Magdalena Andersson's Cabinet between 2021 and 2022. Previously, she served as member of the Riksdag since 29 September 2014, representing the constituency of Jämtland County.
