= Ministry of Supply (Sweden) =

- Folkhushållningsdepartementet

Ministry overview
- Formed: 15 October 1939
- Dissolved: 30 June 1950
- Superseding Ministry: Several different ministries
- Headquarters: Stockholm, Sweden
- Minister responsible: Minister of Supply
- Parent agency: Royal Chancery

The Ministry of Supply (Swedish: Folkhushållningsdepartementet) was a ministry in Sweden established in 1939. The ministry was established in order to provide a better overview of the crisis measures that the Second World War caused. The ministry dealt with administrative matters relating to general guidelines for government activities to ensure the supply within Sweden of necessities that were important to the population or production. The ministry was headed by the minister of supply. The ministry ceased to exist in 1950.

== History ==
At the Riksdag of 1938, the question of a departmental reform was dealt with, mainly due to motions on the establishment of a Ministry of Health. The Riksdag called for an unconditional investigation into the question of a departmental reform, and on 16 December of the same year, County Governor Karl Levinson was summoned as an expert for an investigation into the organization of the government ministries and related issues. After the latter, following a request for special treatment, took up the issue of establishing a ministry for matters related to the crisis that had arisen, and presented a proposal for this, on the basis of this, a bill was submitted at the Riksdag of 1939 for the establishment of a Ministry of Supply, which the Riksdag on 11 October approved. On 14 October, the act on the establishment of a Ministry of Supply was issued, which entered into force on 15 October and was valid until 30 June 1941 or the earlier date that the King in Council appointed. A charter for the ministry came into force on 15 October. The ministry dealt with administrative matters concerning general guidelines for the government's activities to ensure the supply within Sweden of necessities that were of importance to the population or production. It dealt with measures for the regulation of the production of such supplies, export and import, the maintenance and use of the merchant navy, and war insurance, together with legislation within its administrative area. The support measures in the areas of agriculture (with the sugar regulation), forestry and fisheries were, however, continued by the Ministry of Agriculture.

The following government agencies belonged to the ministry: the National [Swedish] Commission for Economic Defence (Rikskommissionen för ekonomisk försvarsberedskap), the National Institute of Economic Research, the National [Swedish] Reserve Storage Board (Statens reservförrådsnämnd), the National [Swedish] Food Commission (Statens livsmedelskommission) (in which the Board of Public Supply (Folkförsörjningsnämnden) amalgamated into), the National [Swedish] Industry Commission (Statens industrikommission), the National [Swedish] Coal Board (Statens kolnämnd), the National [Swedish] Wood Board (Statens vednämnd), the Petrol and Oil Board (Bensin- och oljenämnden), the National [Swedish] Wood Gas Board (Statens gengasnämnd), the National [Swedish] Board for Foreign Trade Licences (Statens handelslicensnämnd) (as of 20 November the National [Swedish] Trade Commission (Statens handelskommission)), National [Swedish] Trade and Shipping Commission (Statens sjöfartsnämnd) as well as the National [Swedish] War Risks Insurance Office (Statens krigsförsäkringsnämnd).

The minister without portfolio Herman Eriksson was appointed head of the Ministry of Supply and minister of supply with the administrative director (kanslichef) Nils Malmfors as state secretary and deputy director (kansliråd) Olof Sahlin as director general for administrative affairs (expeditionschef). The ministry's staff otherwise included two directors (byråchef), one for administrative matters and one for legal matters, two first and one second administrative officers (kanslisekreterare) and more. The ministry had Sweden's first female cabinet minister, Karin Kock, who served as minister of supply from 1948 to 1949. The ministry ceased on 30 June 1950.

== See also ==
- Minister of Supply
