= Peter Kullgren =

Swedish politician (born 1981)

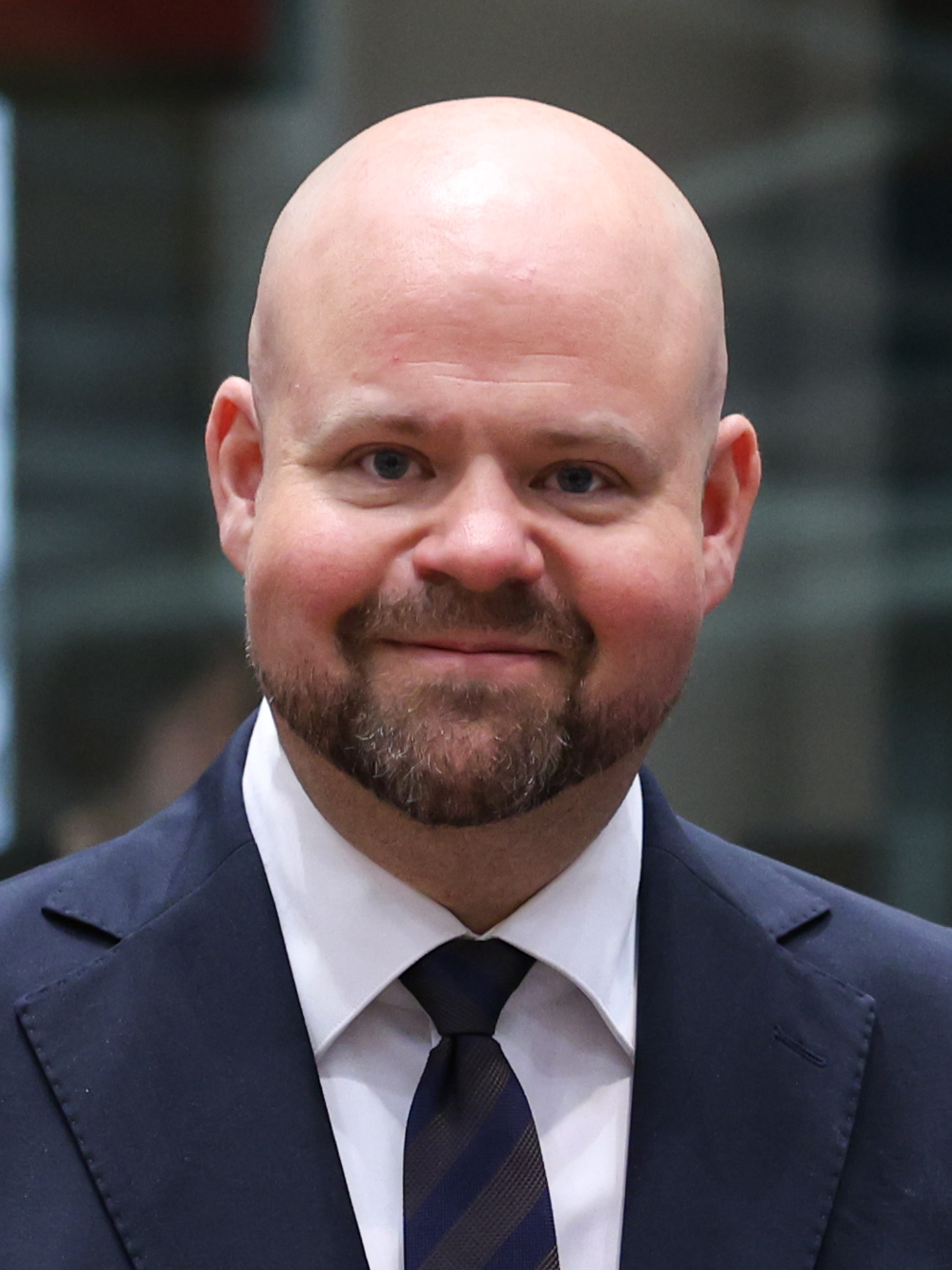
- Kullgren in 2025

Minister of Rural Affairs
- Incumbent
- Assumed office 18 October 2022
- Monarch: Carl XVI Gustaf
- Prime Minister: Ulf Kristersson
- Preceded by: Anna-Caren Sätherberg

Personal details
- Born: 17 May 1981 (age 44) Forshaga, Sweden
- Party: Christian Democrats

Peter Kullgren (born 17 May 1981) is a Swedish politician who serves as Minister of Rural Affairs in the cabinet of Prime Minister Ulf Kristersson since October 2022. A member of the Christian Democrats, he was party secretary from 2018 to 2022.

== Honours ==
=== Foreign honours ===
- Iceland: Grand Cross of the Order of the Falcon (6 May 2025)

Party political offices
Preceded by Acko Ankarberg Johansson	Party secretary of the Christian Democrats; 2018–2022	Succeeded by Johan Ingerö
Political offices
Preceded by Anna-Caren Sätherberg	Minister of Rural Affairs; 2022–present	Incumbent
