= Nils Quensel =

Swedish lawyer and politician

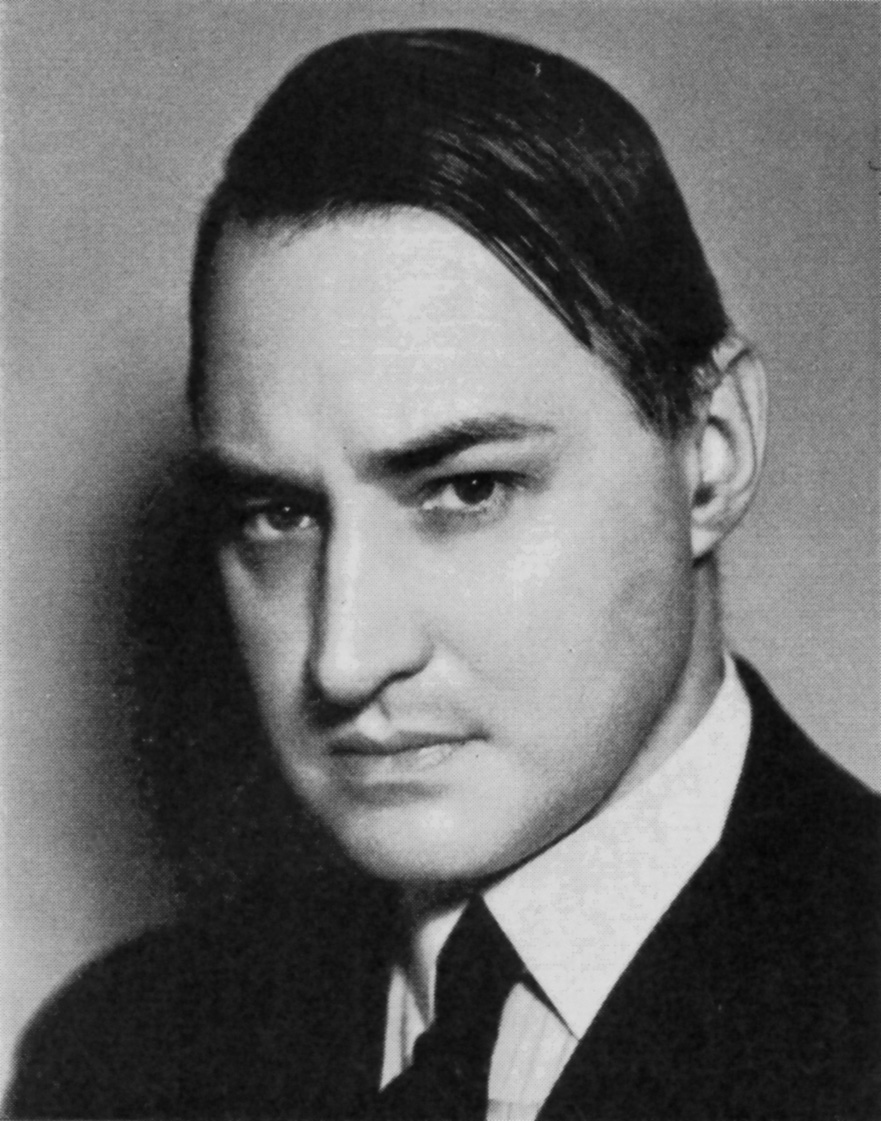

minister without portfolio
- In office 1936–1940 and 1943–1951

president of the Administrative court of appeal
- In office 1940–1961

Personal details
- Born: 22 October 1894
- Died: 8 November 1971
- Occupation: lawyer

Nils Jakob Eberhard Quensel (22 October 1894 – 8 November 1971) was a Swedish lawyer and independent politician. He was a minister without portfolio in the Swedish cabinet 1936–1940 and 1943–1951 serving as legal consultant, from 1945 also as Minister for the Church.

== Biography ==
Quensel studied at Uppsala University where he was awarded a bachelor's degree in 1915 and a candidate of law degree in 1920. He was a district court notary 1920-1922 and started working at Svea Court of Appeal in 1924, where he became an assessor in 1928. In 1931 he took up a position as head of legislation issues at the Ministry of Finance, and in 1933 he became the chief civil servant (expeditionschef, the most senior non-political post) at the Ministry of Finance. In 1934 he became state secretary at the Ministry of Communications.

In 1936 he was appointed a regular judge (hovrättsråd) of Svea Court of Appeal. In 1936 he was also appointed minister without portfolio (legal consultant) in the short-lived Pehrsson-Bramstorp Cabinet, on the recommendation of Ernst Wigforss, a position he continued to hold in the Hansson II Cabinet and Hansson III Cabinet from 1936 to 1940. In 1940 he was appointed president of the Administrative court of appeal. In 1943 he returned to the Hansson III Cabinet as minister without portfolio and legal consultant, and stayed in that post in the Hansson IV Cabinet and Erlander I Cabinet until 1951. He resigned in connection with the Kejne affair.

After his time in the cabinet, Quensel continued as president of the Administrative court of appeal until his retirement in 1961.
