= Minister of Supply (Sweden) =

Swedish government post (1939–1950)

Minister of Supply of Sweden
- Folkhushållningsminister
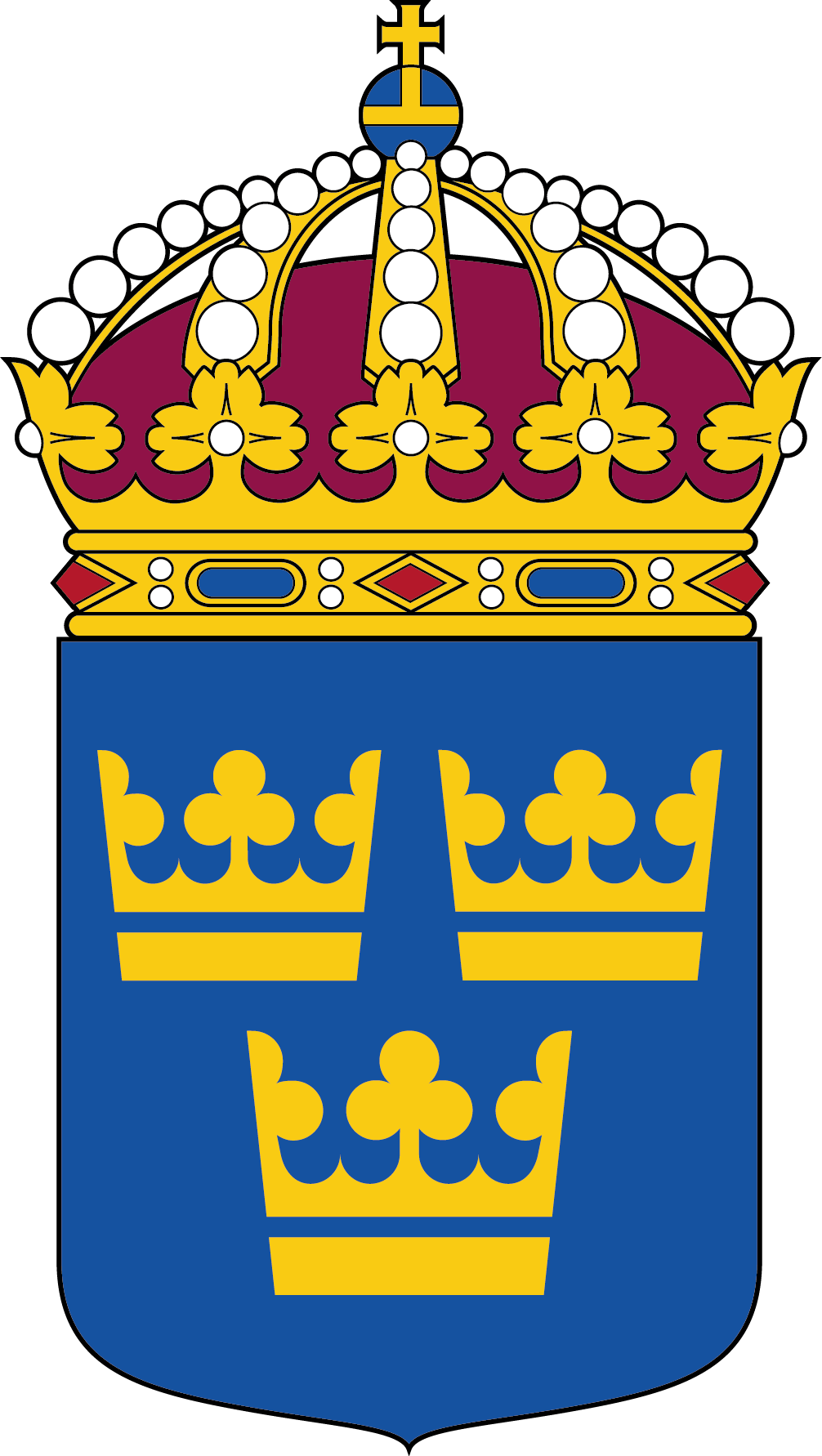
- Lesser coat of arms of Sweden
- Ministry of Supply
- Appointer: The Prime Minister
- Term length: No fixed term Serves as long as the Prime Minister sees fit
- Formation: 15 October 1939
- First holder: Herman Eriksson
- Final holder: John Ericsson
- Abolished: 30 June 1950

The Minister of Supply (Swedish: Folkhushållningsminister) was a member of the government of Sweden. The minister of supply was the head of the Ministry of Supply from 1939 to 1950 which handled matters relating to the national economy.

== History ==
The minister of supply headed the Ministry of Supply which was established on 15 October 1939 to deal with administrative matters concerning general guidelines for the government's activities to ensure the supply within Sweden of necessities that were important for the population or production. Herman Eriksson was entrusted with the task of organizing the new ministry, for matters relating to the national economy, of which Eriksson became the first head. This was perhaps Eriksson's greatest and for Sweden's most significant contribution at this time. As his successor in the position of minister of supply expressed himself about its organization, "it was so expedient and well adapted to the demands of the crisis situation that the whole thing could later be seen as self-evident". Eriksson was succeeded by Axel Gjöres in 1941, who held the position for 6 years. Gjöres in turn was replaced by Gunnar Sträng in 1947. Gjöres had made very important contributions as minister both during the war and in the years immediately after. He did not want to leave the post in 1947, because the Swedish economy was in a very precarious situation.

Gunnar Sträng had been persuaded to become minister of supply. He was then given responsibility for the regulatory policy that was maintained for several years after the Second World War, when it was feared that the depression would strike like after the First World War. That was not the case. Unemployment on a national basis was low, and prices were reasonably kept in order. Gunnar Sträng was succeeded by Karin Kock who became Sweden's first female cabinet minister. In December 1949, Prime Minister Tage Erlander forced Kock to leave her ministerial post to become director general of Statistics Sweden. She was not happy about the change and would have liked to stay, something Erlander had a hard time understanding, considering that her influence had been reduced to insignificance. Erlander had instead wanted Axel Strand, the head of the Swedish Trade Union Confederation, as minister of supply. He declined, however and John Ericsson took over the post for six months before the ministry and thus the post ceased on 30 June 1950.

== List of officeholders ==
Color key

Independent
Historical parties: Lantmanna Moderate National Party Liberals Liberals Liberals Liberals
Present parties: Social Democrats Moderate Centre Left Liberals Christian Democrats Green Sweden Democrats

1939–1950
Portrait	Minister (Born-Died)	Term			Political Party	Coalition	Cabinet
Portrait	Minister (Born-Died)	Took office	Left office	Duration	Political Party	Coalition	Cabinet
Herman Eriksson [sv; gl]	Herman Eriksson (1892–1949)	15 October 1939	7 March 1941	1 year, 143 days	Social Democrats	S–C	Hansson II
Axel Gjöres	Axel Gjöres (1889–1979)	7 March 1941	7 April 1947	6 years, 31 days	Social Democrats	S–C–L–M	Hansson III; Hansson IV; Erlander I
Gunnar Sträng	Gunnar Sträng (1906–1992)	11 April 1947	28 October 1948	1 year, 200 days	Social Democrats	–	Erlander I
Karin Kock-Lindberg	Karin Kock-Lindberg (1891–1976)	29 October 1948	31 December 1949	1 year, 63 days	Social Democrats	–	Erlander I
John Ericsson [sv]	John Ericsson (1907–1977)	1 January 1950	30 June 1950	180 days	Social Democrats	–	Erlander I
