= Gösta Bagge =

Swedish economist and politician

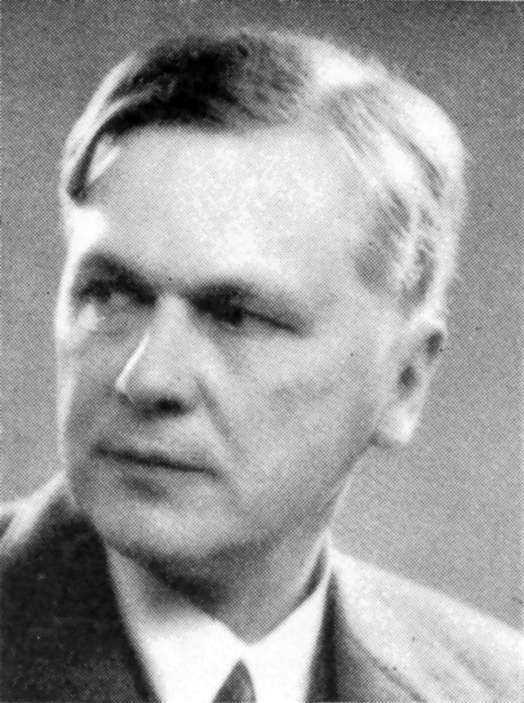

Minister of Education and Ecclesiastical Affairs
- In office 1939–1944

Leader of the National Organization of the Right
- In office 1935–1944

Member of the Riksdag
- In office 1932–1947

Member of the Stockholm City Council
- In office 1913–1926

Personal details
- Born: 27 May 1882 Stockholm, Sweden
- Died: 3 January 1951 (aged 68) Stockholm, Sweden
- Party: General Electoral League
- Education: Stockholm University
- Occupation: economist

Gösta Adolfsson Bagge (27 May 1882 – 3 January 1951) was a Swedish economist and politician who served as Minister of Education during World War II from 1939 to 1944. He succeeded Arvid Lindman as leader of the General Electoral League in 1935 and represented Stockholm in both chambers of the Riksdag from 1932 to 1947.

== Biography ==
Bagge was born in Stockholm and entered Uppsala University in 1900, where he graduated with a bachelor's degree in 1904. He then studied at the Johns Hopkins University in Baltimore 1904–1905. He took a licentiate degree at Stockholm University in 1911 and a Ph.D. in economics in Stockholm in 1917, with a thesis on the regulation of wages through trade unions.

He worked at the National Board of Trade's division for labour statistics 1906 to 1909, where he studied collective bargaining. He was a teacher at the Stockholm School of Economics from 1917 to 1919. In 1921 he was appointed professor of economics and social policy at Stockholm University.

He was elected a Foreign Honorary Member of the American Academy of Arts and Sciences in 1933.

He died on 3 January 1951 in Högalid, Stockholm.

== Political career ==
Bagge was initially active in local politics in Stockholm, where he was a member of the city council from 1913 to 1926. He was then a member of the upper chamber of the Riksdag from 1932 to 1936, and of the lower chamber from 1937 to 1947.

Bagge was named leader of the National Organization of the Right after the sudden retirement of Arvid Lindman in 1935. He remained the party's leader until 1944, when he was succeeded by Fritiof Domö. Bagge was a social conservative politician within the rightist party, but had a liberal view of economic affairs. He was a harsh critic of the economic policies of the social democratic finance minister Ernst Wigforss. Bagge was also Minister of Education and Ecclesiastical Affairs in the Hansson III Cabinet, a coalition government, from 13 December 1939 to 15 December 1944.

In government he was the leading supporter of Finland's fight for survival against the Soviet Union during World War II and wanted to give aid to the Nordic neighbour country.
