= Herman Zetterberg =

Swedish jurist and politician (1904–1963)

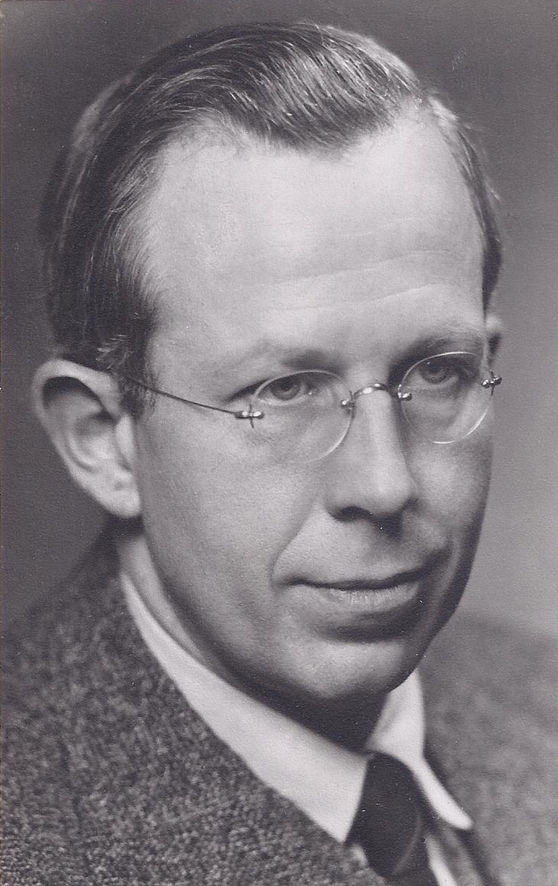

Minister of Justice
- In office 31 July 1945 – 30 September 1957
- Prime Minister: Per Albin Hansson; Tage Erlander
- Preceded by: Thorwald Bergquist
- Succeeded by: Ingvar Lindell

Personal details
- Born: 1 July 1904 Uddevalla, Sweden
- Died: 18 March 1963 (aged 58)
- Party: Social Democratic Party
- Education: Uppsala University

Herman Zetterberg (1 July 1904 – 18 March 1963) was a Swedish politician and jurist who served as Minister for Justice from 1945 to 1957. A member of the Social Democrats Party (SAP), his 12 years in office as head of the Ministry for Justice is the longest in Swedish history.

== Early life and education ==
Zetterberg was born on 1 July 1904 in Uddevalla. His parents were the court of appeal councilor Hugo Zetterberg and Alma Rehnberg.

He graduated with a law degree from Uppsala University in 1928.

== Career ==
Zetterberg was an appellate court counsel in 1942 and served as a member of the law committee 1944–1947. On 31 July 1945, he was appointed justice minister to the cabinet led by Prime Minister Per Albin Hansson. He held this post until 30 September 1957. During his tenure Zetterberg took an anti-Soviet approach. From 1957 to his death in 1963, he was president of the Svea Court of Appeal.

== Personal life and death ==
Zetterberg married twice. His first wife, Kitty Rippe, died of cancer in 1955. He remarried in 1959 to Ulrica Lyttkens, who died in January 1963. Zetterberg died on 18 March 1963.
