= Axel Gjöres =

Swedish politician (1889–1979)

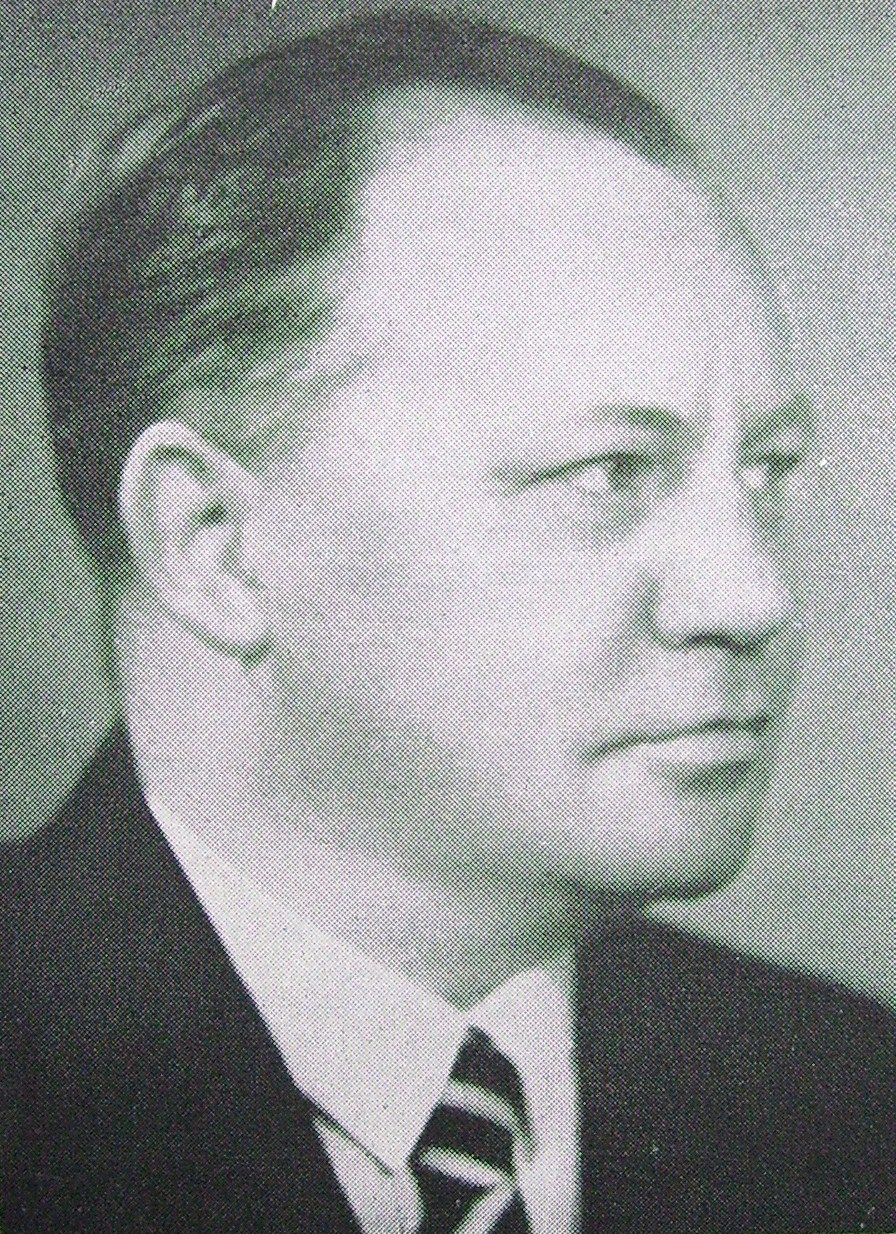

Minister of Commerce and Industry
- In office 1947–1948

Minister of Supply
- In office 1941–1947
- Prime Minister: Per Albin Hansson
- Preceded by: Herman Eriksson
- Succeeded by: Gunnar Sträng

Personal details
- Born: 11 November 1889 Smedjebacken, Sweden
- Died: 12 March 1979 (aged 89) Stockholm, Sweden
- Party: Social Democratic Party
- Education: Stockholm School of Economics

Axel Gjöres (11 November 1889 – 12 March 1979) was a Swedish social democrat politician who served in different government posts. He was the minister of supply between 1941 and 1947 and minister of commerce and industry between 1947 and 1948.

== Early life and education ==
Gjöres was born in Smedjebacken, Dalarna, 1889. In 1905, he joined a social democratic youth club in his hometown. He graduated from Brunnsvik Folk High School in 1909 and attended Stockholm School of Economics between 1917 and 1919. He continued his studies in England. There he studied the methods used in the cooperatives.

== Career ==
Gjöres began to work as a newspaper editor in 1918 which he held the until 1933. In the period 1920–1931 he was also the editor of Kooperatören, a magazine published by the Swedish Cooperative Society. He served as the chairman of the board in the Consumer Co-operative Union between 1926 and 1938. From 1938 to 1941 he was acting director general of the Swedish Board of Trade.

Gjöres was appointed minister of supply in 1941, replacing Herman Eriksson in the post. Gjöres served in the cabinet led by Prime Minister Per Albin Hansson. Gjöres' term ended in 1947, and he was replaced by Gunnar Sträng as minister. Then Gjöres was appointed minister of commerce and industry in 1947. However, he resigned from the post next year.

Then Gjöres served as the director general of the Swedish Board of Trade in the period 1948–1954. He was also a member of the Swedish parliament from 1943 to 1950. Between 1945 and 1957 he was the chairman of the Nordic Association.

== Death ==
Gjöres died in Stockholm in 1979.
