= Fritiof Domö =

Swedish landlord and politician

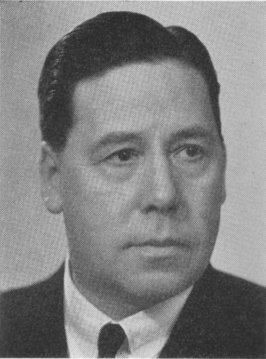

Personal details
- Born: 30 August 1889
- Died: 23 November 1961 (aged 72)
- Political party: Moderate Party
- Spouse: Ellen Carlsson
- Children: 2
- Parent: Karl Johan Alfred Gustafsson Augusta Johansdotter

Johan Fritiof Domö (born Gustafsson, 30 August 1889 – 23 November 1961) was a Swedish landlord and social conservative right politician and mostly known as the party leader for the Moderate Party. Domö was the first vice party leader 1935–1944, and party leader of the Moderate Party 1944–1950, a minister of the Hansson III Cabinet 1939–1945 Minister of Commerce and Industry 1939–1941 and Minister of Communications (Transport) 1944–1945. He was the governor of Skaraborg County between 1951 and 1956.

== Early life ==
Fritiof Domö was born in Hakarp as Fritiof Gustafsson, he was the son of the landlord Karl Johan Gustafsson and his wife Augusta Johansdotter. He studied in Huskvarna and interned as several farmhouses and did self-studies.

In 1913, he owned his own farmhouse, in Åsen outside of Jönköping and from 1918 in Domö. In 1917, he became active in the municipality politics and in 1922 he became a member of the Skaraborgs läns hushållningssällskaps förvaltningsutskott.

== Political career ==
From 1928, Domö was a member of the first chamber, elected by the constituent of Skaraborg. In the Riksdag he became known as a politician who made many motions and he was also an acknowledged farming expert. In 1933 he became a member of the special committee for crisis politics, he participated in the investigations by the Riksdag in 1938 for farming.

In 1935, he became the vice chairman of the Rights national association. And from 1936 in the group leader of the first chamber. As a leader he mentioned the "Jew-problem" and supported a restrictive Swedish refugee policy.

In 1939, the Hansson III Cabinet was formed, and Domö was appointed to the position of Minister of Commerce and Industry.

== Right leader ==
After professor Gösta Bagge had announced that he intended to resign as the leader of the Moderate Party Domö became the strongest candidate to replace him. Many supported his rival Martin Skoglund but he refused to run. Between 1946 and 1949 he was the group leader of the first chamber.

== Personal life ==
Domö married Ellen Carlsson in 1915 and the couple got two daughters.
