= Gunnar Sträng =

Swedish politician (1906–1992)

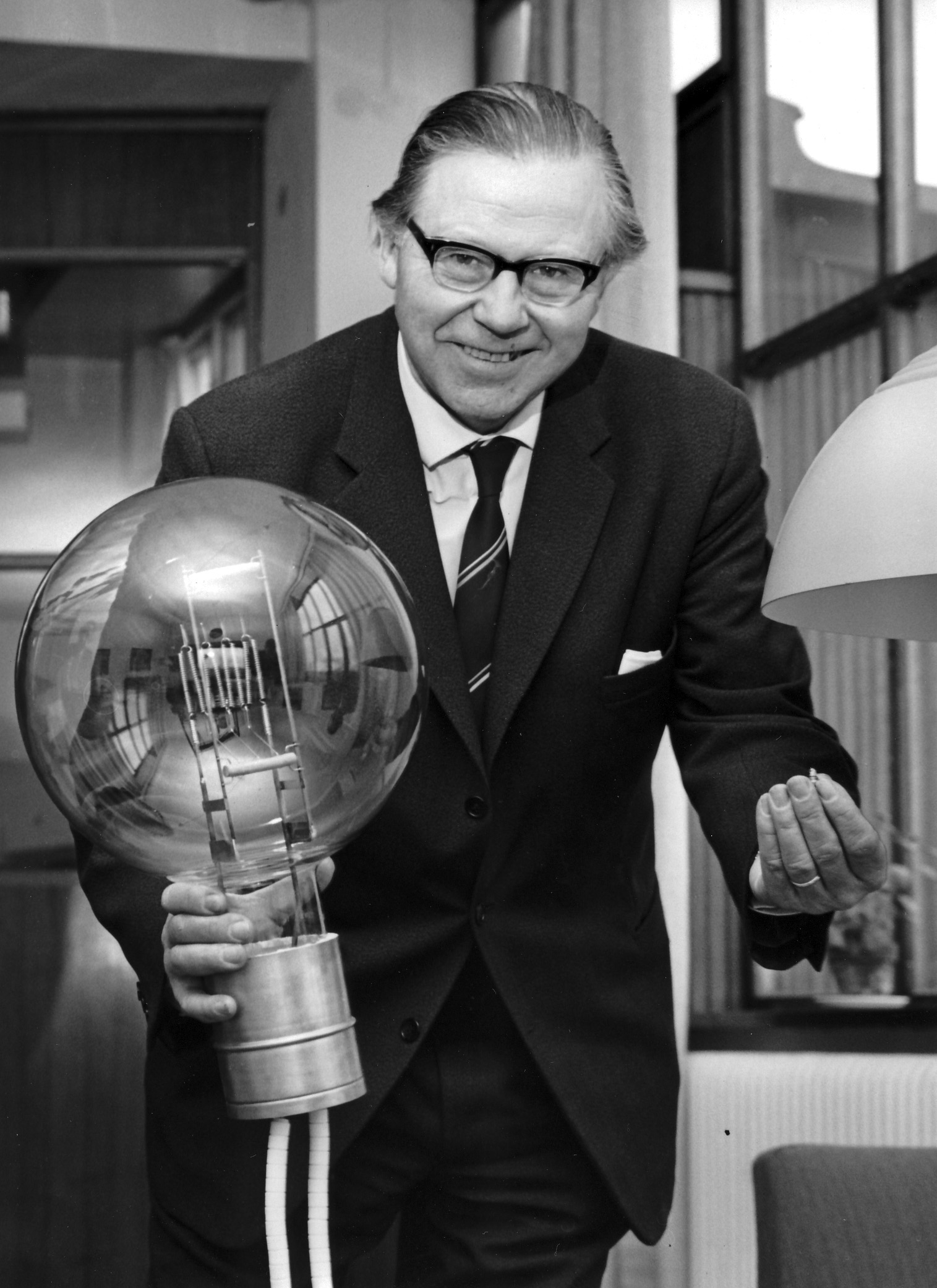
- Sträng in 1961

Minister for Finance
- In office 12 September 1955 – 8 October 1976
- Prime Minister: Tage Erlander; Olof Palme
- Preceded by: Per Edvin Sköld
- Succeeded by: Gösta Bohman

Minister for Social Affairs
- In office 1 October 1951 – 12 September 1955
- Prime Minister: Tage Erlander
- Preceded by: Gustav Möller
- Succeeded by: John Ericsson i Kinna

Minister of Agriculture
- In office 30 October 1948 – 1 October 1951
- Prime Minister: Tage Erlander
- Preceded by: Per Edvin Sköld
- Succeeded by: Sam B. Norup

Minister of Supply
- In office 11 April 1947 – 28 October 1948
- Prime Minister: Tage Erlander
- Preceded by: Axel Gjöres
- Succeeded by: Karin Kock-Lindberg

Personal details
- Born: 23 December 1906 Järfälla, Sweden
- Died: 7 March 1992 (aged 85) Stockholm, Sweden
- Party: Social Democratic
- Occupation: Politician

Gunnar Georg Emanuel Sträng (23 December 1906 – 7 March 1992) was a Swedish trade unionist and statesman who served as Finance Minister (1955–1976) in the cabinets of both Tage Erlander and Olof Palme. He is the longest-serving cabinet member in Swedish history; he continuously held office in every Swedish government from 1945 to 1976. A member of the Social Democratic Party (S), he was also a member of the Riksdag for Västra Götaland from 1946 to 1985.

== Biography ==
Sträng grew up in a working-class family in Lövsta, today a part of Stockholm Municipality. After finishing school he started work as a gardener. In 1927, he joined the local branch of the gardeners' union and was soon elected to the board as secretary. A few years later, in 1932, he was elected as an official to the national union organisation for agricultural workers, with the task of recruiting new members in order to force the employers to consent to collective bargaining. In 1938, he was elected vice chairman of the trade union and the following year he succeeded the chairman.

Through the Swedish Trade Union Confederation, Sträng was appointed as a representative on various state committees, and on 6 July 1945, Prime Minister Per Albin Hansson offered him the position of minister of agriculture. Sträng turned him down but, a few days later, accepted the position of cabinet member, although not with the title of minister. In 1947, Sträng was made minister of supply and implemented harsh measures, such as petroleum rationing. The following year he accepted the role of minister of agriculture and, in 1951, he became minister for social affairs. During this period, health insurance was made mandatory through a state system.

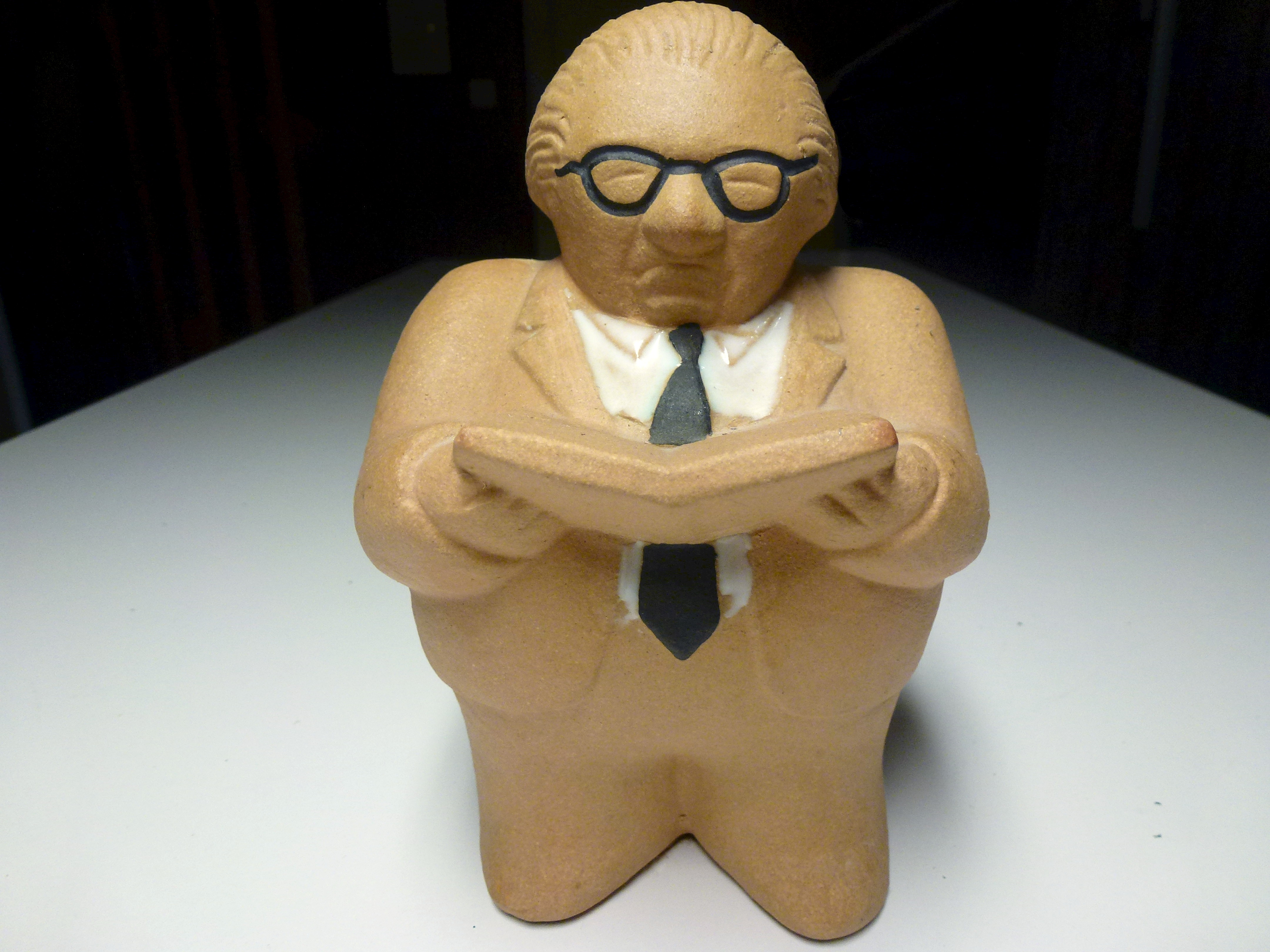
A piggy bank shaped like Gunnar Sträng, by the Swedish designer Lisa Larson.

On 12 September 1955, Sträng was made Minister for Finance. One of the major reforms during his time in office was the introduction of value-added tax. Joint taxation of spouses was abolished, a change that made it more economically attractive for women to seek paid employment. The Social Democrats, together with the Centre Party, also engineered the Swedish newspaper subsidy system, created to support the smaller newspapers in a region in order to prevent "newspaper death" and preserve diversity.

When the Social Democrats did poorly in the 1966 elections, party leader Tage Erlander offered to step down and Sträng was offered the opportunity to take over the leadership – but refused. He remained minister for finance until the Social Democrats lost power to the centre-right in the 1976 elections.

Sträng was generally regarded as economically prudent. He was known for wearing "both suspenders and a belt", also a striking symbol of his careful general attitude. He was also known to have a photographic memory and was able to quote the figures from the national budget by heart in his annual presentations on television and made this dull subject something of a popular event. For the Swedish people he was very highly respected as a trustworthy national householder (rikshushållare) of the Swedish economy. His powerful position both inside and outside of the cabinet has led to comparisons to Gustav Vasa.

In the 1970s Sträng became the face of the record-high taxation in Sweden through an incident with the Swedish children's author Astrid Lindgren. On 10 March 1976 Lindgren, whose income was rather high, realised the rate of her marginal tax had risen to an absurd figure of 102%, in other words for every krona she earned she had to pay back a tax of one krona and two öre. She published an ironical story called Pomperipossa i Monismanien in the newspaper Expressen, about the Swedish tax policy, which had caused Lindgren to pay more tax than she earned. Sträng replied to her that she should stick to things she could understand. This backfired against Sträng, and Lindgren's story was a contributing factor to the Social Democrats led by Olof Palme losing the election later in the year, for the first time in 40 years. Expressen's editor at the time, Bo Strömstedt, tells about Sträng's reaction in the parliament when he read the story:

"When Gunnar Sträng had read the story he went up to the speaking chair and said:
- Yes, Mrs. Lindgren can tell stories but she sure can't count.
This was careless. Astrid stole his line: Gunnar Sträng was always good at telling stories, but he had never learned to count, it would be better for them to switch jobs."

Sträng was awarded the Illis quorum by the government of Sweden in 1984.

He died in Stockholm in 1992.

Government offices
Preceded by Axel Gjöres	Minister of Supply; 1947–1948	Succeeded by Karin Kock-Lindberg
Preceded by Per Edvin Sköld	Minister of Agriculture; 1948–1951	Succeeded by Sam B. Norup
Preceded by Gustav Möller	Minister for Social Affairs; 1951–1955	Succeeded by John Ericsson
Preceded by Per Edvin Sköld	Minister for Finance; 1955–1976	Succeeded by Gösta Bohman
