= Karin Kock-Lindberg =

Swedish politician and economist

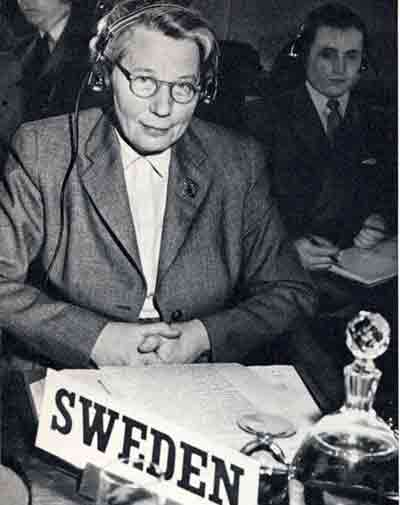
- Karin Kock-Lindberg at a UN meeting in Geneva, ca 1947.

Minister of Supply
- In office 1948–1949
- Preceded by: Gunnar Sträng
- Succeeded by: John Ericsson

Personal details
- Born: 2 July 1891 Stockholm, Sweden
- Died: 28 July 1976 (aged 85) Stockholm, Sweden
- Party: Social Democrats

Karin Kock-Lindberg (née Kock; 2 July 1891 – 28 July 1976) was a Swedish politician (Social Democrats) and professor of economics. In 1947 she became the first woman to hold a ministerial position in Sweden. She was also the first female professor of economics in Sweden. Karin Kock was known as Karin Kock-Lindberg after her marriage to lawyer Hugo Lindberg in 1936.

== Biography ==
Karin Kock was born in Stockholm, and studied at the London School of Economics and Stockholm University. She was a lecturer at Stockholm University in 1933–1938, and was appointed professor of economics in 1945, after already having functioned as such for several years.

She published several works in economics, her speciality being credit and trade cycle problems. Her English language works include her doctoral thesis A Study of Interest Rates (1929) and International Trade and the GATT (1969), as well as The National Income of Sweden 1861-1930 (1937) written in collaboration with two other economists.

Karin Kock was given several official assignments, such as economic adviser at the Women's Workers Association in 1936 and government delegate at the International Workers' Conference in Paris in 1945. She was a member of The Committee for Increased Women's Representation, founded in 1937 to increase women's political representation. She served as minister without portfolio of questions regarding the economy in 1947–1948 and as minister of supply in 1948–1949.

Following the dissolving of the Ministry of Supply in 1950, Karin Kock became director of Statistics Sweden. She was head of the agency from 1950 to 1957. During 1953 and 1954 she was chairman of the Swedish Statistical Society. She became a fellow of the American Statistical Association in 1956 and a member of the International Statistical Institute in 1958.

As head of Sweden's delegation to the United Nations Economic Commission for Europe, she acted for some years as chairman of its plenary session in Geneva.

Karin Kock was also chairperson of Akademiskt bildade kvinnors förening (The Association of Female Academicians) from 1926 to 1933 and vice president of International Federation of University Women.

== See also ==
- Olivia Nordgren
- Kerstin Hesselgren
