= Minister for Sports (Sweden) =

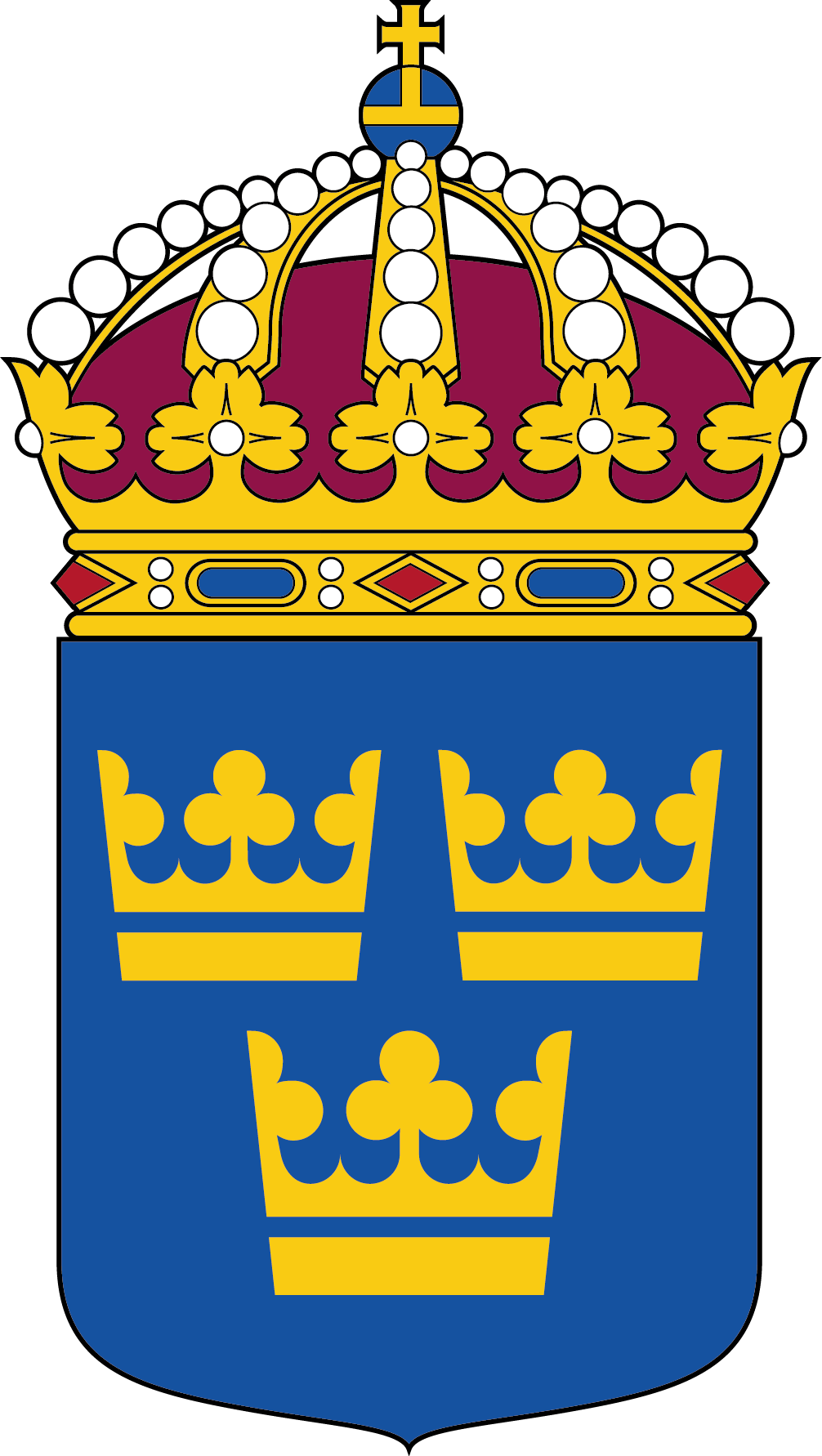
- Lesser coat of arms of Sweden

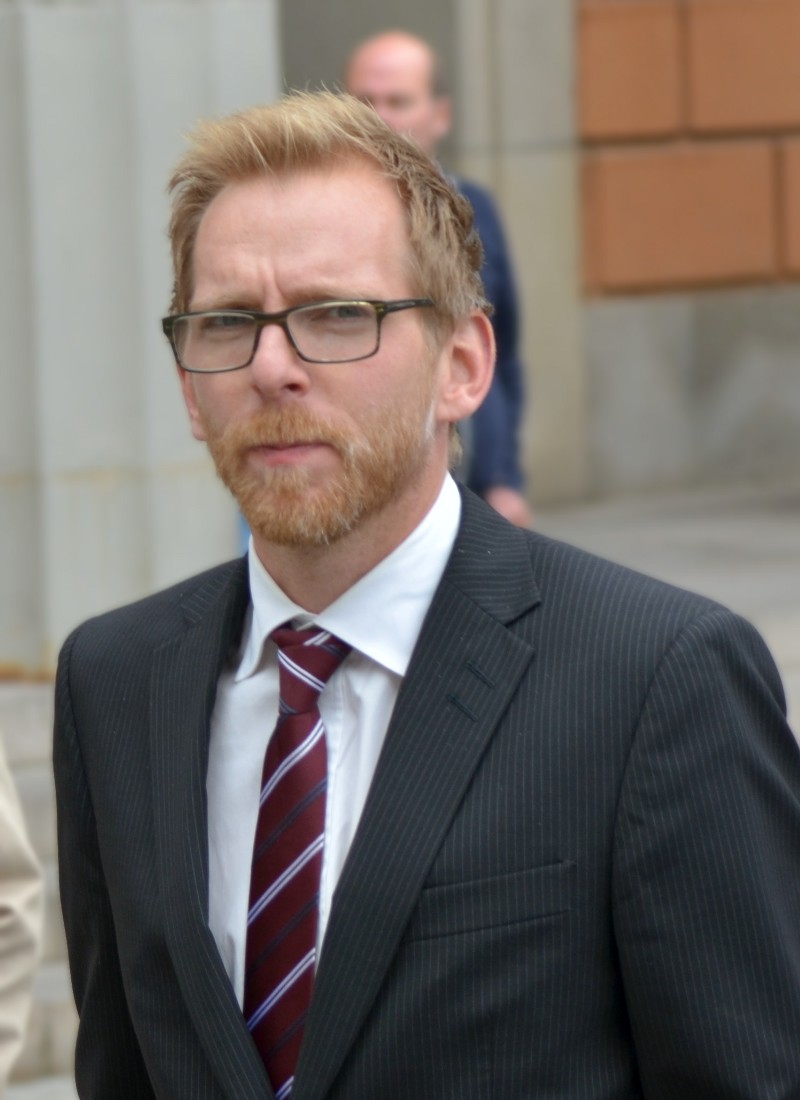
- Incumbent; Jakob Forssmed since 18 October 2022
- Ministry for Social Affairs
- Member of: The Government
- Appointer: The Prime Minister
- Term length: Serves at the pleasure of the Prime Minister
- Formation: 1988
- First holder: Ulf Lönnqvist

The minister for sports (Swedish: idrottsminister) is the sports minister of Sweden and responsible for issues regarding sports.

The position of Minister for Sports has usually been held by a minister as a part of a wider ministerial portfolio, and it has sorted under different ministries throughout the years.

The current minister for sports is Jakob Forssmed of the Christian Democrats. He concurrently serves as the minister for social affairs.

== Spokesperson for the government's sports policy ==
In the end of the 1970s, at the appointment of the Ullsten Cabinet. Prime Minister Ola Ullsten appointed Rune Ångström as spokesperson for the government's sport policy. The position existed between 1978 and 1979.

No.	Spokesperson (Born–Died)	Tenure			Political party	Cabinet
No.	Spokesperson (Born–Died)	Took office	Left office	Duration	Political party	Cabinet
1	Rune Ångström (1923–2007)	18 October 1978	12 October 1979	359 days	Liberal People's	Ullsten

== List of ministers for sports ==
No.	Portrait	Minister (Born–Died)	Other Positions	Tenure			Political party	Cabinet
No.	Portrait	Minister (Born–Died)	Other Positions	Took office	Left office	Duration	Political party	Cabinet
1		Ulf Lönnqvist (born 1936)	Minister for Housing	4 October 1988	4 October 1991	3 years, 0 days	Social Democrats	Carlsson I Carlsson II
2		Bo Lundgren (born 1947)	Deputy Minister for Finance and Minister for Taxes	4 October 1991	7 October 1994	3 years, 3 days	Moderat	Carl Bildt
3		Marita Ulvskog (born 1951)	Minister for Civil Service Affairs; Minister for Gender Equality	7 October 1994	22 March 1996	1 year, 167 days	Social Democrats	Carlsson III
4		Leif Blomberg (1941–1998)	Deputy Minister of the Interior; Minister for Integration	22 March 1996	2 March 1998 †	1 year, 345 days	Social Democrats	Persson
5		Lars Engqvist (born 1945)	Deputy Minister of the Interior; Minister for Integration	16 March 1998	7 October 1998	205 days	Social Democrats	Persson
6		Ulrica Messing (born 1951)	Deputy Minister for Culture; Minister for Integration	7 October 1998	21 October 2000	2 years, 14 days	Social Democrats	Persson
7		Mona Sahlin (born 1957)	Deputy Minister for Justice; Minister for Integration; Minister for Democracy; Minister for Gender Equality	21 October 2000	21 October 2004	4 years, 0 days	Social Democrats	Persson
8		Bosse Ringholm (born 1942)	Minister for Finance; Deputy Prime Minister	21 October 2004	6 October 2006	1 year, 350 days	Social Democrats	Persson
9		Cecilia Stegö Chilò (born 1959)	Minister for Culture	6 October 2006	16 October 2006	10 days	Moderate	Reinfeldt
–		Lars Leijonborg (acting)	Minister for Education; Minister for Culture (acting)	16 October 2006	24 October 2006	8 days	Liberal People's	Reinfeldt
10		Lena Adelsohn Liljeroth (born 1955)	Minister for Culture	24 October 2006	3 October 2014	7 years, 344 days	Moderate	Reinfeldt
11		Gabriel Wikström (born 1985)	Minister for Public Health; Minister for Healthcare	3 October 2014	27 July 2017	2 years, 297 days	Social Democrats	Löfven I
–		Annika Strandhäll (acting)	Minister for Social Security	5 May 2017	27 July 2017	83 days	Social Democrats	Löfven I
12		Annika Strandhäll (born 1975)	Minister for Social Affairs	27 July 2017	21 January 2019	1 year, 178 days	Social Democrats	Löfven I
13		Amanda Lind (born 1980)	Minister for Culture; Minister for Democracy	21 January 2019	30 November 2021	2 years, 313 days	Green	Löfven II; Löfven III
14		Anders Ygeman (born 1970)	Minister for Migration and Asylum Policy; Minister for Integration	30 November 2021	18 October 2022	322 days	Social Democrats	Andersson
15		Jakob Forssmed (born 1974)	Minister for Social Affairs	18 October 2022	Incumbent	3 years, 324 days	Christian Democrats	Kristersson

== Ministry history ==
The office of Minister for Sports has been under several different ministries since its founding in 1988.

Ministry	Term
Ministry of Housing	1988–1991
Ministry of Finance	1991–1994
Ministry for Civil Service Affairs	1994–1996
Ministry of the Interior	1996–1998
Ministry of Culture	1998–2000
Ministry of Justice	2000–2004
Ministry of Finance	2004
The Prime Minister's Office	2004–2006
Ministry of Culture	2006–2014
Ministry of Health and Social Affairs	2014–2019
Ministry of Culture	2019–2021
Ministry of Justice	2021–2022
Ministry of Health and Social Affairs	2022–
