= Minister for Democracy (Sweden) =

Cabinet minister in Swedish government

- Demokratiminister
- Lesser coat of arms of Sweden

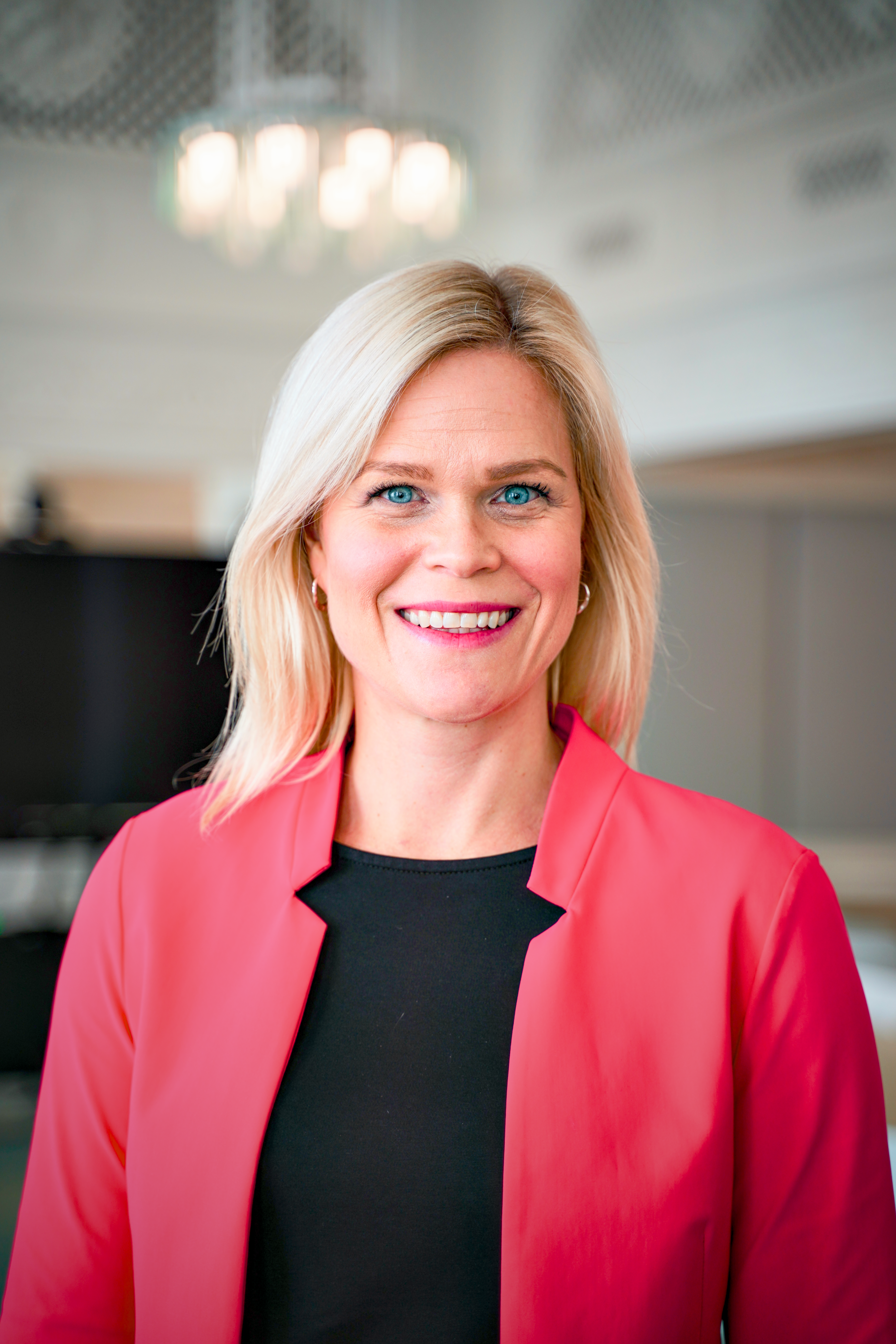
- Incumbent; Paulina Brandberg since 18 October 2022
- Member of: The Government
- Appointer: The Prime Minister
- Term length: Serves at the pleasure of the Prime Minister
- Inaugural holder: Britta Lejon
- Formation: 1998

The Minister for Democracy (Swedish: Demokratiministern) is a cabinet minister within the Swedish Government and appointed by the Prime Minister of Sweden.

The minister is responsible for issues regarding democracy.

== Lists of Ministers for Democracy ==
№	Democracy Minister		Position	Took office	Left office	Duration	Party	Prime Minister
1	Britta Lejon	Britta Lejon (born 1964)	Deputy Minister for Justice and Minister for the Youth and Consumers	7 October 1998	15 October 2002	4 years, 8 days	Social Democrats	Göran Persson
2	Mona Sahlin	Mona Sahlin (born 1957)	Deputy Minister for Justice and Minister for Integration and Gender Equality	21 October 2002	21 October 2004	2 years, 0 days	Social Democrats	Göran Persson
3	Jens Orback	Jens Orback (born 1957)	Deputy Minister for Justice and Minister for Integration and Gender Equality	21 October 2004	6 October 2006	1 year, 350 days	Social Democrats	Göran Persson
4	Nyamko Sabuni	Nyamko Sabuni (born 1969)	Minister for Integration and Gender Equality	6 October 2006	5 October 2010	3 years, 364 days	Liberals	Fredrik Reinfeldt
5	Birgitta Ohlsson	Birgitta Ohlsson (born 1975)	Minister for EU Affairs	5 October 2010	3 October 2014	3 years, 363 days	Liberals	Fredrik Reinfeldt
6	Alice Bah Kuhnke	Alice Bah Kuhnke (born 1971)	Minister for Culture	3 October 2014	21 January 2019	4 years, 110 days	Green	Stefan Löfven
7	Amanda Lind	Amanda Lind (born 1980)	Minister for Culture	21 January 2019	30 November 2021	2 years, 313 days	Green	Stefan Löfven
8	Jeanette Gustafsdotter	Jeanette Gustafsdotter (born 1965)	Minister for Culture	30 November 2021	17 October 2022	7 years, 229 days	Social Democrats	Magdalena Andersson
9	Paulina Brandberg	Paulina Brandberg (born 1983)	Minister for Gender Equlity and Deputy Minister for Employment	18 October 2022	Incumbent	3 years, 324 days	Liberals	Ulf Kristersson

== Ministry history ==
The office of Minister for Democracy have been under several different ministries since its founding in 1998.

Ministry	Term
Ministry of Justice	1998–2006
Ministry for Integration and Gender Equality	2006–2010
The Prime Minister's Office	2010–2014
Ministry of Culture	2014–2022
Ministry of Employment	2022–
