= Amanda Lind =

Swedish politician (born 1980)

- Lind in 2026

Spokesperson of the Green Party
- Incumbent
- Assumed office 28 April 2024 Serving with Daniel Helldén
- Preceded by: Märta Stenevi

Minister for Culture, Democracy and for Sports
- In office 21 January 2019 – 30 November 2021
- Prime Minister: Stefan Löfven
- Preceded by: Alice Bah Kuhnke (Culture and Democracy); Annika Strandhäll (Sports)
- Succeeded by: Jeanette Gustafsdotter (Culture and Democracy); Anders Ygeman (Sports)

Secretary-General of the Green Party
- In office 14 May 2016 – 21 January 2019
- Preceded by: Anders Wallner
- Succeeded by: Marléne Tamlin (acting)

Member of the Riksdag
- Incumbent
- Assumed office 26 September 2022

Personal details
- Born: Amanda Sofia Margareta Johansson; 2 August 1980 (age 46) Uppsala, Sweden
- Party: Green
- Spouse: Björn Ola Lind
- Children: 3

Amanda Sofia Margareta Lind (née Johansson; born 2 August 1980) is a Swedish politician and psychologist serving since 2024 as co-spokesperson of the Green Party. Between 2019 and 2021, she served as Minister for Culture and Democracy, with responsibility for sport and national minorities in the second Löfven cabinet.

== Early life and education ==
From the age of three, Lind grew up in Luleå where her father Erik Hugo Johansson was a pastor and her mother Eva Bask Johansson was a pharmacist. Having studied at Umeå University, she received her master's degree in psychology in 2009.

== Career ==
Lind became a member of Miljöpartiet de gröna, the Swedish Green Party, in 1999, and was a member of the Umeå municipal council from 2002 to 2004. Lind worked as a child and adolescent psychologist for Västernorrland County council from 2009 to 2011. In 2010, she was appointed spokesperson for the Härnösand social affairs agency and in 2012 as spokesperson for Västernorrland. Between 2011 and 2014, she chaired the social affairs committee in the municipality of Härnösand with responsibility for cultural, environmental, planning and recreational issues.

Lind was municipal councillor and first vice-chair of the municipal council in Härnösand from 2014 to 2018. She became the Green Party secretary in 2016, succeeding Anders Wallner. In January 2019, she became the Swedish Minister for Culture and Democracy, with responsibility also for sport and national minorities. In November 2021, when the Green Party left the government, she was succeeded as minister by Jeanette Gustafsdotter. On 28 April 2024, Lind was elected to as the co-spokesperson of the Green Party, succeeding Märta Stenevi.

== Controversy ==
In 2019, the Chinese ambassador to Sweden Gui Congyou threatened Lind with a ban on entering his country when she attended Svenska PEN’s Tucholsky Prize ceremony in honor of Gui Minhai, a book publisher detained in China. In 2021, Lind as the Swedish culture minister stated that Elfdalian would remain judged as a dialect by the Swedish government, after an inquiry by Swedish MP Peter Helander as to why the government hadn't investigated whether Elfdalian should be classified as a language, as the Council of Europe had proposed.

== Personal life ==
Lind is married to filmmaker Björn Ola Lind. The couple has three children together. In her spare time she devotes herself to historical re-creation, tennis and handicrafts.

=== Lind and the Esperanto language ===
Lind speaks Esperanto, and addressed the 104th World Esperanto Congress in fluent Esperanto. The Congress took place in Lahti, Finland from 20 to 27 July 2019. Here is the Esperanto message, with an English translation on the right:

"Saluton, estimataj kongresanoj!

Mi estas Amanda Lind, sveda ministro pri kulturo, demokratio, sporto kaj naciaj minoritatoj. Kiel ano de Miljöpartiet (la sveda verda partio) kaj la tutmonda verda movado, kaj vivanta naturo kaj floranta kulturo estas valoroj tre proksimaj al mia koro.

Elkorajn bondezirojn mi sendas al la Universala kongreso. Renkontiĝoj kaj babilado inter homoj estas fundamento por vigla demokrata evoluo. Dankon al vi ĉiuj en la Esperanto-movado pro viaj kontribuoj por instigi komunikadon trans lingvaj kaj naciaj limoj. Ni estu unu homaro sur ĉi-unu terglobo!

Amike."

"Hello, esteemed congress delegates!

I am Amanda Lind, Swedish Minister for Culture, Democracy, Sport and National Minorities. As a member of the Miljöpartiet (the Swedish Green Party) and the global Green movement, both living nature and flowering culture are values very close to my heart.

I am delighted to send out my cordial good wishes to the World Congress. Meetings and conversations among people are the foundation for vibrant democratic development. Thank you all in the Esperanto movement for your contributions to encourage communication across language and national borders. Let's be one humanity on this one globe!

In friendship."

Party political offices
Preceded by Märta Stenevi	Spokesperson of the Green Party Serving with: Daniel Helldén; 2024–	Incumbent
Preceded by Anders Wallner	Secretary-General of the Green Party; 2016–2019	Succeeded by Marléne Tamlin (acting)
Political offices
Preceded by Alice Bah Kuhnke	Minister for Culture; 2019–2021	Succeeded by Jeanette Gustafsdotter
Preceded by Alice Bah Kuhnke	Minister for Democracy; 2019–2021	Succeeded by Jeanette Gustafsdotter
Preceded by Annika Strandhäll	Minister for Sports; 2019–2021	Succeeded by Anders Ygeman
Preceded by Christer Nylander	Chairman of the Parliamentary Committee on Cultural Affairs; 2022–	Incumbent
