= Urga =

Urga may refer to:

- former name of Ulaanbaatar, the capital of Mongolia
  - the former Catholic missio sui iuris of Urga
- Ürgə, a village and municipality in Lankaran Rayon of Azerbaijan
- Urga (movie) a.k.a. Close to Eden, a 1991 film by Nikita Mikhalkov
- Urga (Cazin), Bosnia and Herzegovina
- Urga (music group), an alternative music group from Sweden.
