= Alice Bah Kuhnke =

Swedish politician (born 1971)

Alice Bah Kuhnke MEP
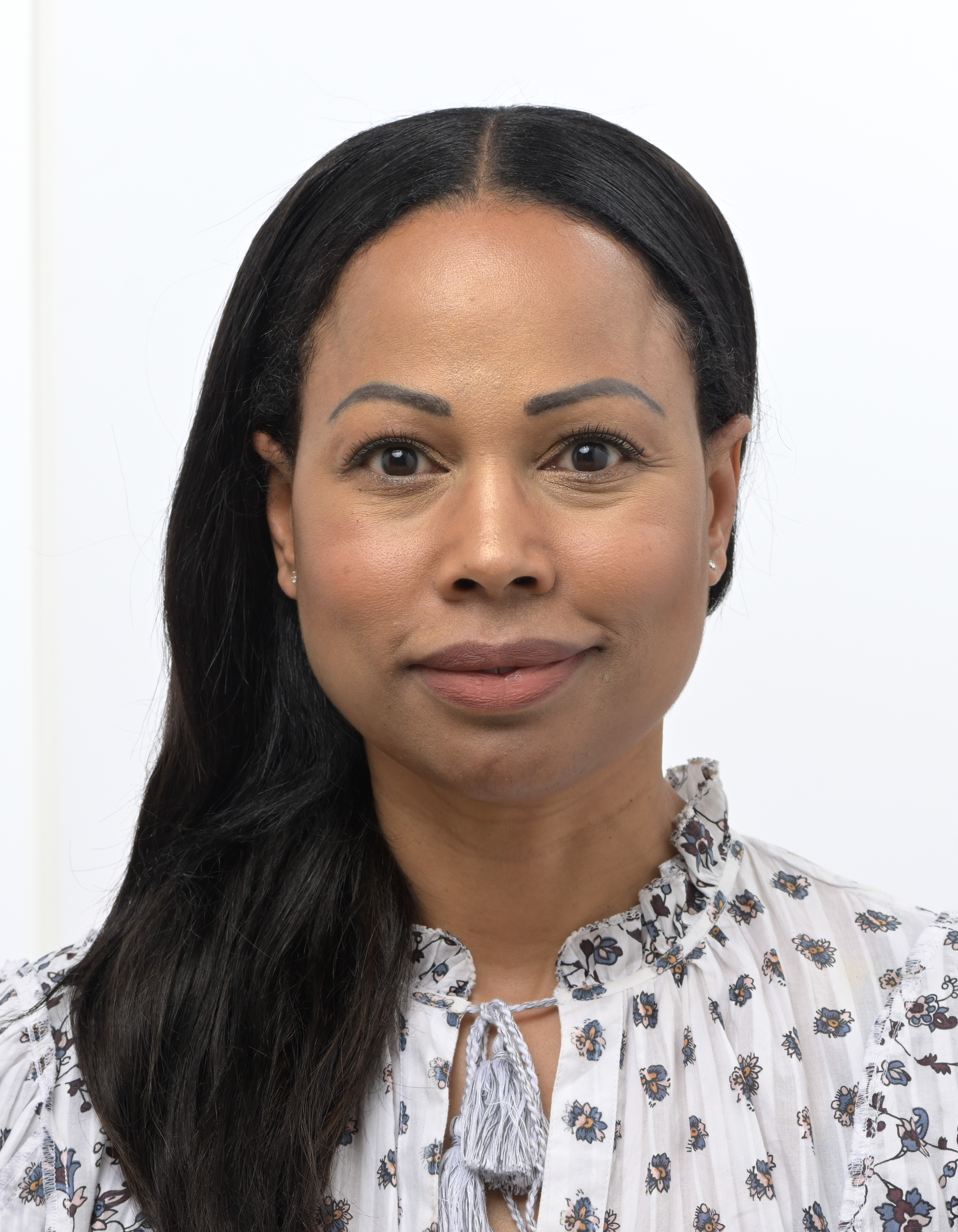
- Official portrait, 2024

Vice-Chair of the Group of the Greens/European Free Alliance
- Incumbent
- Assumed office 2 July 2019
- Co-chairs: Ska Keller; Philippe Lamberts
- Serving alongside: Gwendoline Delbos-Corfield; Bas Eickhout; Terry Reintke; Molly Scott Cato; Alyn Smith; Ernest Urtasun

Member of the European Parliament
- Incumbent
- Assumed office 2 July 2019
- Constituency: Sweden

Minister for Culture
- In office 3 October 2014 – 21 January 2019
- Prime Minister: Stefan Löfven
- Preceded by: Lena Adelsohn Liljeroth (Culture); Birgitta Ohlsson (Democracy)
- Succeeded by: Amanda Lind

Personal details
- Born: Alice Bah; 21 December 1971 (age 54) Malmö, Sweden
- Party: Green
- Spouses: Henrik Johnsson (m. 1998; div. 2002) Johannes Kuhnke (m. 2003; div. 2023)
- Children: 3
- Website: Alice Bah Kuhnke (mp)

Alice Bah Kuhnke (née Bah; 21 December 1971) is a Swedish politician for the Green Party who is currently a Member of the European Parliament since 2019. Previously she served as the Minister of Culture and Democracy from October 2014 to January 2019. Before going into politics, she was a television presenter. She also helped found the think tank Sektor3.

She was elected Member of the European Parliament in the 2019 European Parliament election in Sweden.

== Early life and education ==
Bah was born on 21 December 1971 in Malmö. She grew up in Horda in Jönköping, Sweden, the daughter of a Gambian father and a Swedish mother. She attended a track-and-field-oriented high school in Växjö and was one of the country's best female sprinters in the late 1980s, with the 200-meter dash her speciality.

== Career ==
=== Television ===
Bah's television career began with SVT's "Disney Club" in 1992. Between 1998 and 1999, she had her own talk show at TV4 and many other television assignments, including the current-event show "Kalla fakta".

On 16 January 2001, She hosted the televised music festival Artister mot nazister in Globen.

=== Private and public sector ===
Alice Bah Kuhnke was Director General for the Swedish Agency for Youth and Civil Society 2013–2014. She also worked as General Secretary for the NGO Fairtraide Sweden (Rättvisemärkt) 2004-2007 In September 2009, Bah took the position of manager of environmental quality and corporate social responsibility at ÅF. Alongside that job, she served on the board of a small internet design firm, Doberman.

=== Political career ===
In 1994, Bah campaigned actively for her country to join the EU in a referendum. After leaving television to study political science, she headed a philanthropic fund at the Swedish insurance company Skandia.

Bah was a member of the Swedish Church synod from 2006 until 2010, a member of the board of the Royal Dramatic Theatre, and Vice President of YMCA-YWCA Sweden.

On 3 October 2014, Bah was appointed Minister of Culture and Democracy in the Löfven Cabinet. In addition to her role in government, she served as the Green Party's representative at the European Green Party from 2016.

==== Member of the European Parliament, (2019–present) ====
Alice Bah Kuhnke presenting herself in a video produced by Heinrich Böll Foundation/Green European Foundation.

In 2019, Bah stood down as minister to lead her party's list for the European elections. In parliament, she has since been serving as deputy chairwoman of the Greens–European Free Alliance (Greens/EFA) group, under the leadership of co-chairs Ska Keller (2019–2022), Philippe Lamberts (2019–2024), Terry Reintke (since 2022) and Bas Eickhout (since 2024). She also joined the Committee on Civil Liberties, Justice and Home Affairs and the Committee on Women's Rights and Gender Equality.

In addition to her committee assignments, Bah is a member of the European Parliament Intergroup on Anti-Corruption, the European Parliament Intergroup on Anti-Racism and Diversity, the European Parliament Intergroup on LGBT Rights and the European Parliament Intergroup on the Welfare and Conservation of Animals.

In January 2022, she was the Greens/EFA candidate as a new President of the European Parliament. She was not elected, having garnered only 101 votes in the first round.

In September 2022, Bah was the recipient of the Environment and Climate Action Award at The Parliament Magazine's annual MEP Awards. At the 2024 MEP Awards ceremony, Bah was one of twenty MEPs to be given a "Rising Star" award.

== Personal life ==
In her late teens, Bah was engaged for two years to long jump Olympic finalist and World Silver Medalist Mattias Sunneborn. In 1998, she married TV personality Henrik Johnsson, from whom she was divorced in 2002. The following year, she married actor and singer Johannes Kuhnke, with whom she has three daughters.

Political offices
Preceded by Lena Adelsohn Liljeroth	Minister for Culture; 2014–2019	Succeeded by Amanda Lind
Preceded by Birgitta Ohlsson	Minister for Democracy; 2014–2019	Succeeded by Amanda Lind
