= Internet Party =

Internet Party may refer to:

- Internet Party (Spain)
- Internet Party (New Zealand)
- Internet Party of Ukraine
- Internet Party (United States)
