= Artister mot nazister =

Swedish anti-fascist music campaign

Artister mot nazister was originally a term referring to a music gala inside the Stockholm Globe Arena in Sweden on 16 January 2001, against ideologies and opinions like nazism, racism, fascism and xenophobia. Following the gala several artists and groups created a foundation called Artister mot nazister. The gala aired over TV4 and live over SR P3.

== Album ==
Circa one week after the gala, a double album was released.

=== Track listing ===
==== CD 1 ====
1. Artister mot nazister – Det här är ditt land (This Land is Your Land, single edit) - 4.54
2. Adolf Fredrik Music Classes Children's Choir – Du gamla, du fria - 3.52
3. Mark Levengood & Alice Bah - Introduction - 2.11
4. Thåström – Älska dig själv - 3.39
5. Stefan Sundström – Fisk i en skål - 4.52
6. Lars Winnerbäck – Nånting större - 5.18
7. Staffan Hellstrand & Idde Schultz – Fanfar - 3.36
8. Tomas Andersson Wij – Landet vi föddes i - 3.07
9. Fattaru – Gul & blå II - 4.20
10. Feven feat. Nougie Jadama – Tänk om - 4.13
11. Hiphopkollektivet – Glöm aldrig - 5.25
12. Marie Fredriksson – För dom som älskar - 4.31
13. The Ark – Ain't Too Proud to Bow - 4.05
14. Rikard Wolff & The Ark – Vackra pojkar, vackra män - 4.36
15. Mikael Wiehe – En sång till modet 4.17
16. Hans Alfredson - Speech - 2.11

==== CD 2 ====
1. Urga – Too Late - 5.20
2. Anders Högström – Speech - 1.42
3. Johan Pihlgren & Sahara Hotnights – Solglasögon - 2.57
4. Mark Levengood & Alice Bah - Speech 1.21
5. Superia – Permission - 3.39
6. Jonas Gardell - Speech 3.46
7. Di Leva feat. Timbuktu – Jag ger mitt hjärta - 5.21
8. Tomas Ledin – Balladen om djävulen och ängeln - 6.07
9. Bo Kaspers Orkester – Vi kommer aldrig att dö - 5.15
10. Eagle Eye Cherry & Blacknuss – Together - 6.47
11. Blacknuss feat. ADL & Swing – Getaway - 4.58
12. Tomas Ledin, Mikael Wiehe, Markoolio & Blacknuss – Håll Sverige rent - 5.41
13. Peps Persson, Emilia Rydberg, Petter, Feven, Daddy Boastin, ADL, Ola Salo, Lisa Ekdahl, Cajsalisa Ejemyr & Blacknuss Allstars – Det här är ditt land (This Land is Your Land) - 5.26
