= List of direct democracy parties =

This is a list of political parties around the world who advocate for direct democracy. Not to be confused with parties that internally use direct democracy approaches.

== Americas ==
Brazil

- Green Party (Brazil)
- Socialism and Liberty Party

Canada

- None of the Above Direct Democracy Party

Chile

- Humanist Party
- Apruebo Dignidad (Coalition)
  - Humanist Action
  - Democratic Revolution
  - Communist Party of Chile
  - Social Green Regionalist Federation
  - Christian Left of Chile
  - Social Convergence
  - Commons
  - Unite Movement
  - Common Force

United States

- United States Pirate Party
- Green Party (United States)

Uruguay

- Green Animalist Party

Venezuela

- Fatherland for All

== Asia ==
Israel

- Brit Olam (National Team)

Japan

- No Party to Support
- The Assembly to Energize Japan
- The Party to Protect the People from NHK

Iran

- Kurdistan Free Life Party

Syria

- Syrian National Democratic Alliance
- Democratic Union Party (Syria)

Iraq

- Kurdistan Democratic Solution Party

Pakistan

- Pakistan Green Party

== Europe ==
Albania

- Albania Becomes Movement
- Challenge for Albania

Austria

- Neutral Free Austria Federation
- The Greens – The Green Alternative

Cyprus

- Direct Democracy Cyprus

Croatia

- Law and Justice
- Workers' Front
- Zagreb is OURS

Czech Republic

- Dawn – National Coalition
- Freedom and Direct Democracy
- Public Affairs

Estonia

- Conservative People's Party of Estonia
- Estonian Greens
- Estonian Nationalists and Conservatives

France

- Parti Pirate

Finland

- Change 2011
- Movement Now
- Avoin Puolue

Germany

- Action Citizens for Justice
- Citizens for Germany
- Democracy DIRECT!
- Democracy in Motion
- Democratic Union of Germany
- dieBasis
- Die Violetten
- Freie Wähler
- From Now on... Democracy Through Referendum
- Germans Originating from all of Germany (Autochthons)
- INDEPENDENTS for citizen-friendly democracy
- MERA25
- Pirate Party Germany

Greece

- Ecologist Greens

Hungary

- Party of Internet Democracy

Iceland

- Left-Green Movement
- Humanist Party

Ireland

- Direct Democracy Ireland

Italy

- Five Star Movement

Netherlands

- More Direct Democracy

Spain

- Internet Party
- Partido Pirata
- Podemos
- (Galicia (Spain)) Galicia
  - Land Party

Poland

- Kukiz'15
- Demokracja Bezpośrednia
- Demokracja Bezpośrednia (parliamentary circle)

Russia

- Party of Direct Democracy

Sweden

- Aktiv Demokrati
- Demoex (Democracy Experiment)
- Direktdemokraterna
- Libertarian Municipal People

Turkey

- Left Party
- Kurdistan Workers' Party
- Green Left Party

United Kingdom

- Communist Workers' Organisation

== Oceania ==
New Zealand

- Green Party of Aotearoa New Zealand
