= Makode Linde =

Swedish artist, musician and DJ (born 1981)

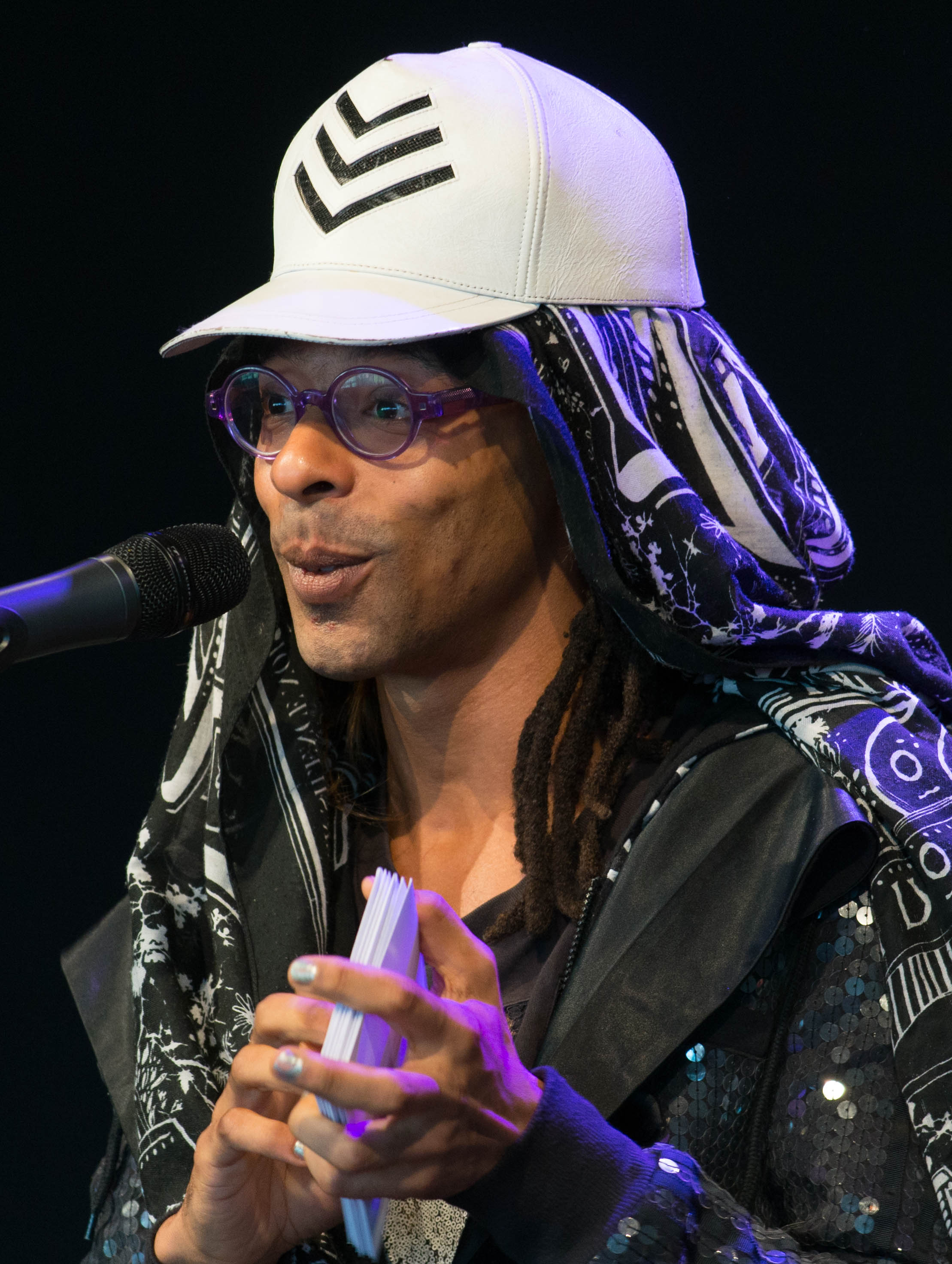
- Makode Linde 2015.
- Born: 28 June 1981 (age 44); Stockholm, Sweden
- Occupations: Artist, activist

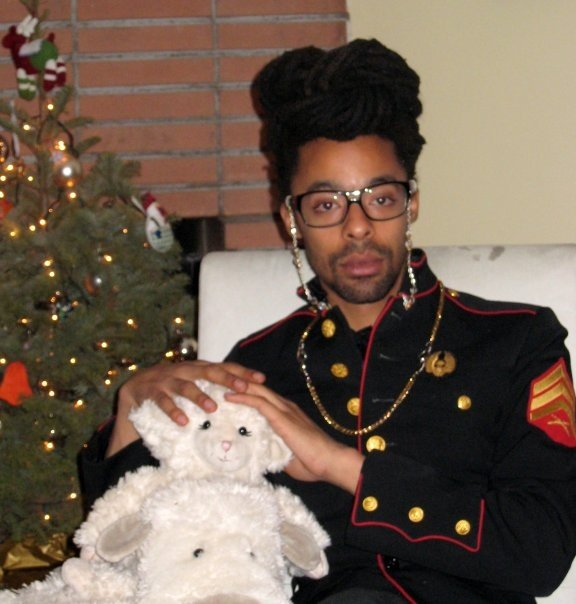
Makode Linde 2008.

Makode Alexander Joel Linde (born 28 June 1981) is a Swedish artist, musician and DJ. He became internationally known for his controversial art piece Painful Cake, which he created in Stockholm in 2012.

== Early life ==
Linde was born in an artistic family. His father was a musician and his mother played in children's theatre works. He is fifth in a family of six children. Linde studied art at Konstfack, California College of the Arts and Royal Institute of Art. He was born to a Guinean father and Swedish mother.

== Early work ==
In 2008, he was a co-organizer for a club at the bar F12 in Stockholm where he performed as a magician using live chickens after painting them different colours. He was reported and charged with animal cruelty which led to a trial. He was later acquitted. In 2010 he was commissioned to decorate Berns and used wallpaper with heroic portraits of famous club and nightlife people and DJs.

== Painful Cake 2012 ==
Linde's art became internationally known through an event at the Moderna Museet in Stockholm in April 2012. At the 75th anniversary celebration of the Konstnärernas riksorganisation (KRO) he had been invited to make the cake which he called Painful Cake. He decorated and made the cake in the shape of a black Venus of Willendorf, but with his own head in full black make-up looking like a stereotypical black person, a so-called "Golliwog". When the first piece of the cake was cut, a resemblance of female genitals were revealed with Linde screaming to give the effect of an actual black woman being cut. The scene was filmed with a video camera and the effect was increased by the fact that the person slicing the first piece of cake was the Swedish Minister of Culture Lena Adelsohn Liljeroth.

Some claimed racism in the depiction of the cake as an art piece and the event was reported to the Parliamentary Ombudsman. The Afro-Swedish society demanded that the Minister of Culture should resign. Linde claimed to have been misunderstood and explained that the cake symbolized how white people consumed black people, with the act of cutting off the cake's body parts and eating it.

== Awards ==
- Nominated to Dagens Nyheter kulturpris (art) 2013
- Årets konstnär 2013, Strömstads kommun

== Exhibitions ==
2012

- Afromantics XXL – Kungsträdgården Stockholm
- Makode Linde: Retrospective 2004–2011 – Galleri Jonas Kleerup Showroom, Stockholm
- Painful Cake – Moderna Museet, Stockholm
