= Parisa Liljestrand =

Swedish politician (born 1983)

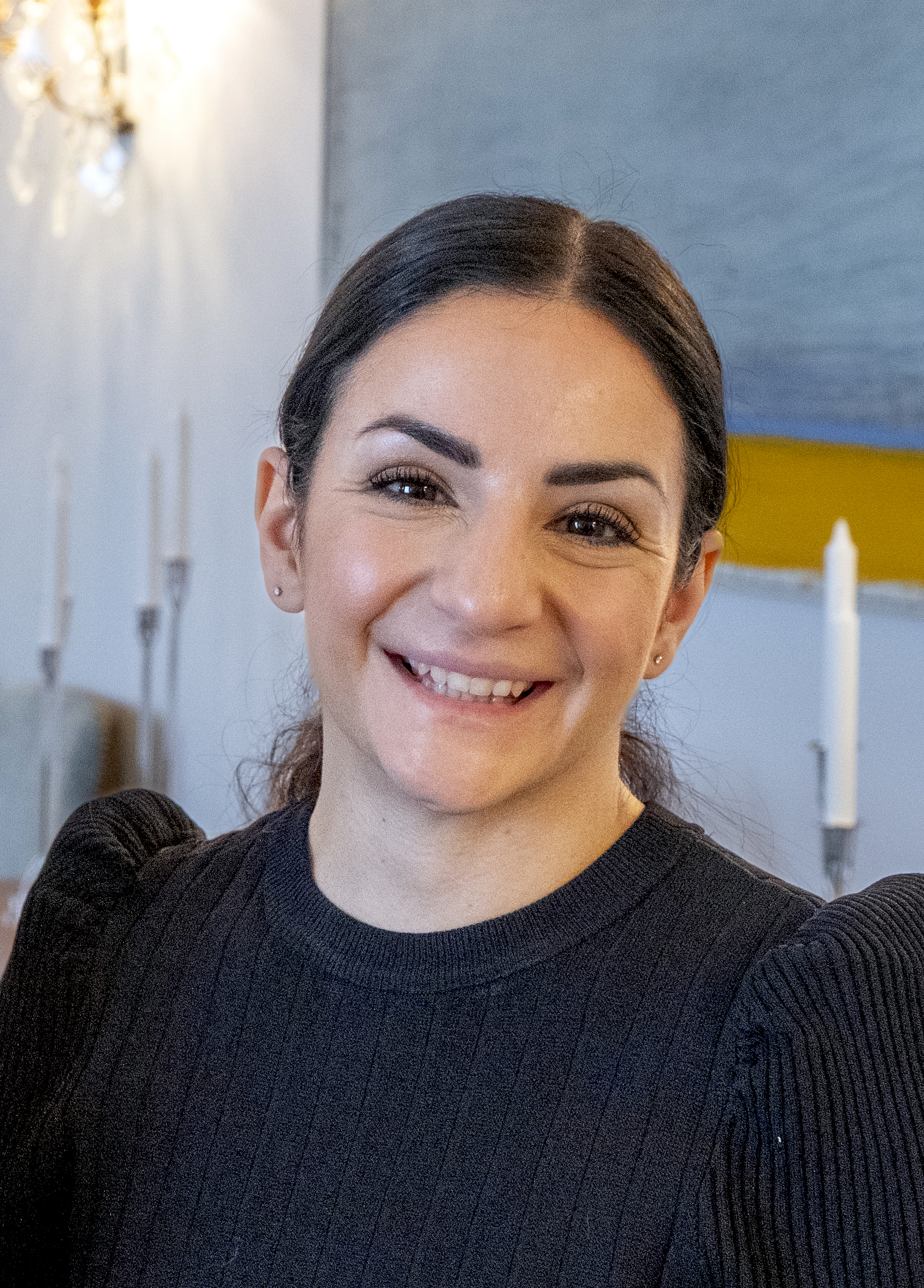
- Liljestrand in 2024

Minister for Culture
- Incumbent
- Assumed office 18 October 2022
- Monarch: Carl XVI Gustaf
- Prime Minister: Ulf Kristersson
- Preceded by: Jeanette Gustafsdotter

Chair of the Vallentuna City Council
- In office 17 June 2015 – 17 October 2022
- Preceded by: Örjan Lid
- Succeeded by: Johan Skog

Personal details
- Born: Parisa Molagholi; 15 March 1983 (age 43) Oshnavieh, Iran
- Citizenship: Sweden
- Party: Moderate Party
- Education: Uppsala University
- Occupation: Teacher • Politician

Parisa Mollagholi Liljestrand (born 15 March 1983) is a Swedish politician for the Moderate Party. She is the Minister for Culture in the Ulf Kristersson cabinet since 18 October 2022.

== Family background ==
Liljestrand was born in Iran. When she was four, the family fled Iran following the Iranian Revolution and during the Iran-Iraq War. Her father was a pilot in the Iranian armed forces and was able to steal a helicopter and fly his family out of the country in the dark over the mountains. After six months at the refugee center in Surahammar, the family finally ended up in Vallentuna. In an article in Svenska Dagbladet in 2016, she said that she "takes every opportunity" to celebrate both Swedish and Iranian holidays. She is for the protection of "the libertarian, the democratic values and independence, not least".

== Education ==
Parisa Liljestrand studied to be a teacher at Uppsala University between 2001 and 2007. She was principal in Vaxholm until 2018.

== Career ==
In 2002, she founded the direct democratic party Demoex, which was represented in the municipal council in Vallentuna between 2002 and 2010.

In 2010, she got involved in the Moderate Party instead. After the 2018 election, she became chairwoman of the municipal board in Vallentuna Municipality. She has also chaired the municipality's Business and Labor Market committee, Planning and Environment committee and the Children's and Youth committee.

In 2022, Liljestrand was appointed Sweden's Minister for Culture. This includes overseeing the government's relationship with the Swedish Sami community. In 2024, the Swedish gaming industry released a list of 15 culturally significant games under assignment from Liljestrand as the culture minister.

== Personal life ==
She lives in Stockholm and is married with three children.

== Honours ==
=== Foreign honours ===
- Iceland: Grand Cross of the Order of the Falcon (6 May 2025)
