= Bengt Göransson =

Swedish social democrat politician (1932–2021)

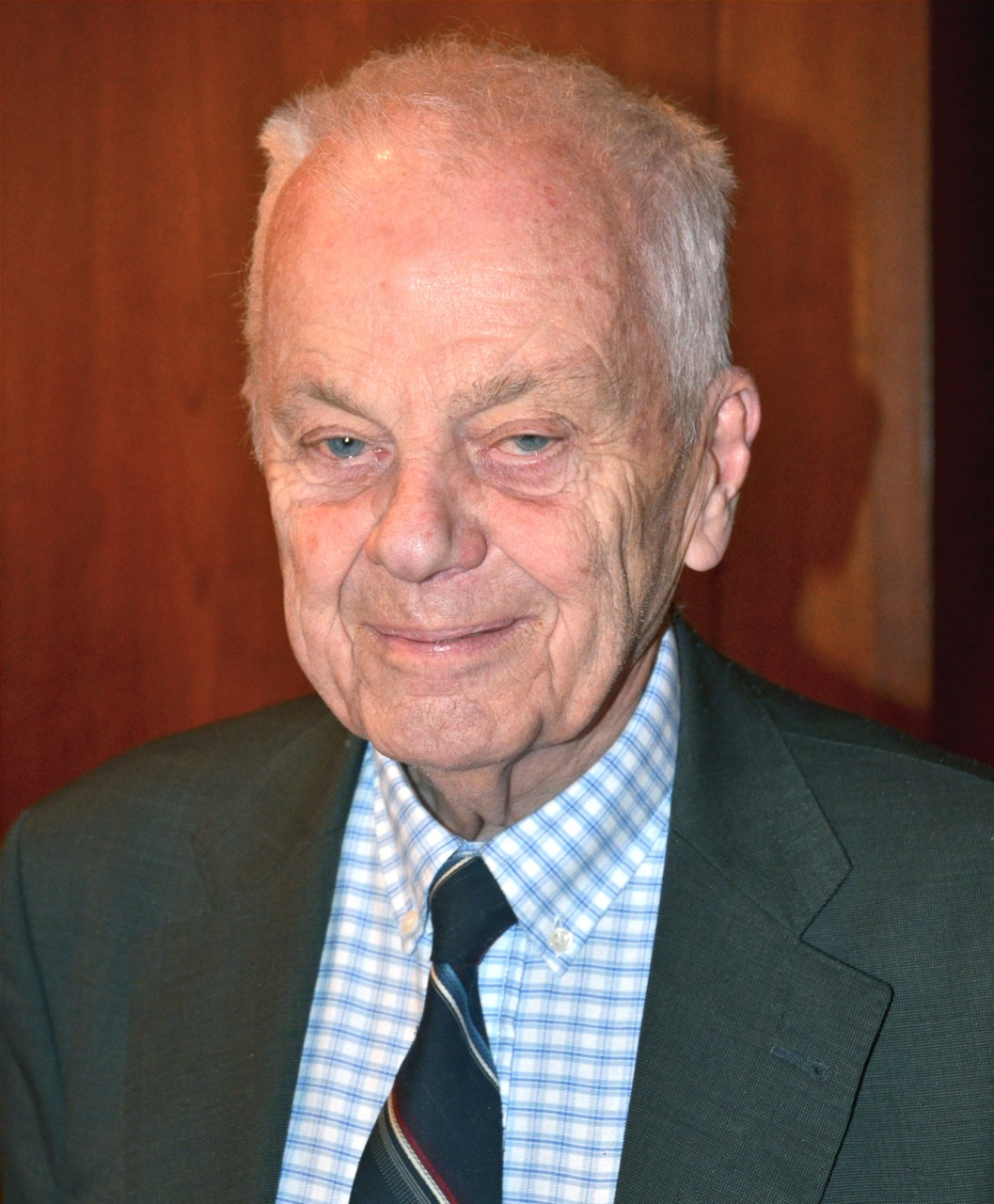
- Bengt Göransson in 2011

Minister of Culture
- In office 1982–1991
- Prime Minister: Olof Palme; Ingvar Carlsson

Minister of Education
- In office 1982–1989
- Prime Minister: Olof Palme; Ingvar Carlsson

Personal details
- Born: 25 July 1932 Stockholm, Sweden
- Died: 17 June 2021 (aged 88)
- Party: Social Democratic Party
- Awards: Illis quorum 2001

Bengt Göransson (25 July 1932 – 17 June 2021) was a Swedish educator and social democrat politician who held different cabinet posts, including minister of culture and minister of education. He also served in the Parliament for two terms between 1985 and 1991.

== Biography ==
Göransson was born in Södermalm in 1932. In his youth he was a member of the Swedish Social Democratic Youth League. Later he joined the Social Democratic Party. Göransson worked at the Workers' Educational Association and the People's House.

He served as minister of culture from 1982 to 1991. During his term the Gothenburg Film Festival was launched. He was also the minister of education for two terms. He was first appointed to the post in the cabinet of Olof Palme in 1982 and remained in the office until 1989. His second term as minister of education was between 1989 and 1991. During the period 1985–1991 he represented the social democrats in the Riksdag.

In 2001 Göransson was awarded the Illis quorum. In 2006 he was awarded an honorary doctorate by the University of Gothenburg.

Göransson died on 17 June 2021 at the age of 88.
