= Birgitta Ohlsson =

Swedish politician (born 1975)

- Ohlsson in 2014

Minister for European Union Affairs and Democracy
- In office 2 February 2010 – 3 October 2014
- Prime Minister: Fredrik Reinfeldt
- Preceded by: Cecilia Malmström (European Union Affairs); Nyamko Sabuni (Democracy)
- Succeeded by: Office abolished (European Union Affairs); Alice Bah Kuhnke (Democracy)

Member of the Riksdag
- Incumbent
- Assumed office 28 September 2026
- Constituency: Stockholm County
- In office 15 September 2002 – 9 September 2018
- Constituency: Stockholm County

Leader of the Liberal Youth of Sweden
- In office 1999–2002
- Preceded by: Erik Ullenhag
- Succeeded by: Fredrik Malm

Personal details
- Born: Eva Birgitta Ohlsson; 20 July 1975 (age 51) Linköping, Sweden
- Party: Centre Party (since 2026)
- Other political affiliations: Liberals (1994–2026)
- Spouse: Mark Klamberg
- Children: 2
- Education: Stockholm University

Eva Birgitta Ohlsson Klamberg (born 20 July 1975) is a Swedish politician who was Minister for European Union Affairs in the Swedish government from 2010 to 2014. She was a member of the Liberals, formerly the Liberal People's Party. Birgitta Ohlsson serves as the National Democratic Institute's director of political parties.

In June 2017, Ohlsson challenged incumbent party leader Jan Björklund to become the next leader at the congress in November 2017. On 15 September 2017, following results from the 'test election' in Stockholm County, Ohlsson announced she was to relinquish her leadership bid and to leave the political arena by the next general election in 2018.

== Early life and education ==
Birgitta Ohlsson was born on 20 July 1975 in Linköping, Östergötland County, Sweden. She received her upper secondary (gymnasium) education at Katedralskolan in Linköping between 1991 and 1994. Between 1994 and 1997 she studied political science, international relations and United Nations studies at Stockholm University.

== Career ==
Between 1997 and 1999 Ohlsson worked as an editorial writer for several liberal newspapers in Sweden, such as Sundsvalls Tidning, Vestmanlands Läns Tidning, Västerbottens-Kuriren and Dagens Nyheter. Between 1999 and 2002 she was chair of the Liberal Youth of Sweden, the youth wing of the Liberal People's Party.

In the 2002 general election Ohlsson was elected a member of the Swedish parliament, representing the Stockholm Municipality constituency. In the parliament she served as a substitute to the Committee on the Labour Market (2002–2006) and the Committee on Foreign Affairs (2002–2004), and as a member of the Committee on Foreign Affairs (2006–2010). In the parliament she was also her party's spokesperson on foreign affairs.

She has also held various voluntary assignments, such as chair of the Association of Liberal Students in Stockholm (1996–1998), deputy chair of Young European Federalists in Sweden (1998), member of the board of the Swedish International Liberal Centre (since 2001), chair of the Swedish Republican Association (2002–2005), deputy chair of the Sweden–Israel Friendship Association in Stockholm (2003–2005), member of the national board of the Liberal People's Party (since 2007) and chair of the Federation of Liberal Women (2007–2010). She is also part of the Elie Wiesel Network of Parliamentarians for the Prevention of Genocide and Mass Atrocities and against Genocide Denial.

On 2 February 2010 Ohlsson was appointed as new Minister for European Union Affairs in the Swedish government, succeeding Cecilia Malmström.

From 2018 until 2019, Ohlsson served on an Independent Commission on Sexual Misconduct, Accountability and Culture Change at Oxfam, co-chaired by Zainab Bangura and Katherine Sierra.

Ohlsson later returned to politics as a candidate for the Centre Party in the 2026 general election.

== Personal life ==
Birgitta Ohlsson is married to Mark Klamberg, a Ph.D. and professor of international law at Stockholm University.

Party political offices
Preceded by Erik Ullenhag	Chairperson of the Liberal Youth of Sweden; 1999–2002	Succeeded by Fredrik Malm
Political offices
Preceded by Cecilia Malmström	Minister for European Union Affairs; 2010–2014	Vacant Title next held by Ann Linde
Preceded by Nyamko Sabuni	Minister for Democracy; 2010–2014	Succeeded by Alice Bah Kuhnke
Preceded by Nyamko Sabuni	Minister for Consumer Affairs; 2010–2014	Succeeded by Per Bolund
