= Cádiz (Congress of Deputies constituency) =

Electoral constituency in Spain

Coordinates: 36°30′N 5°45′W

- Congress of Deputies; Electoral constituency
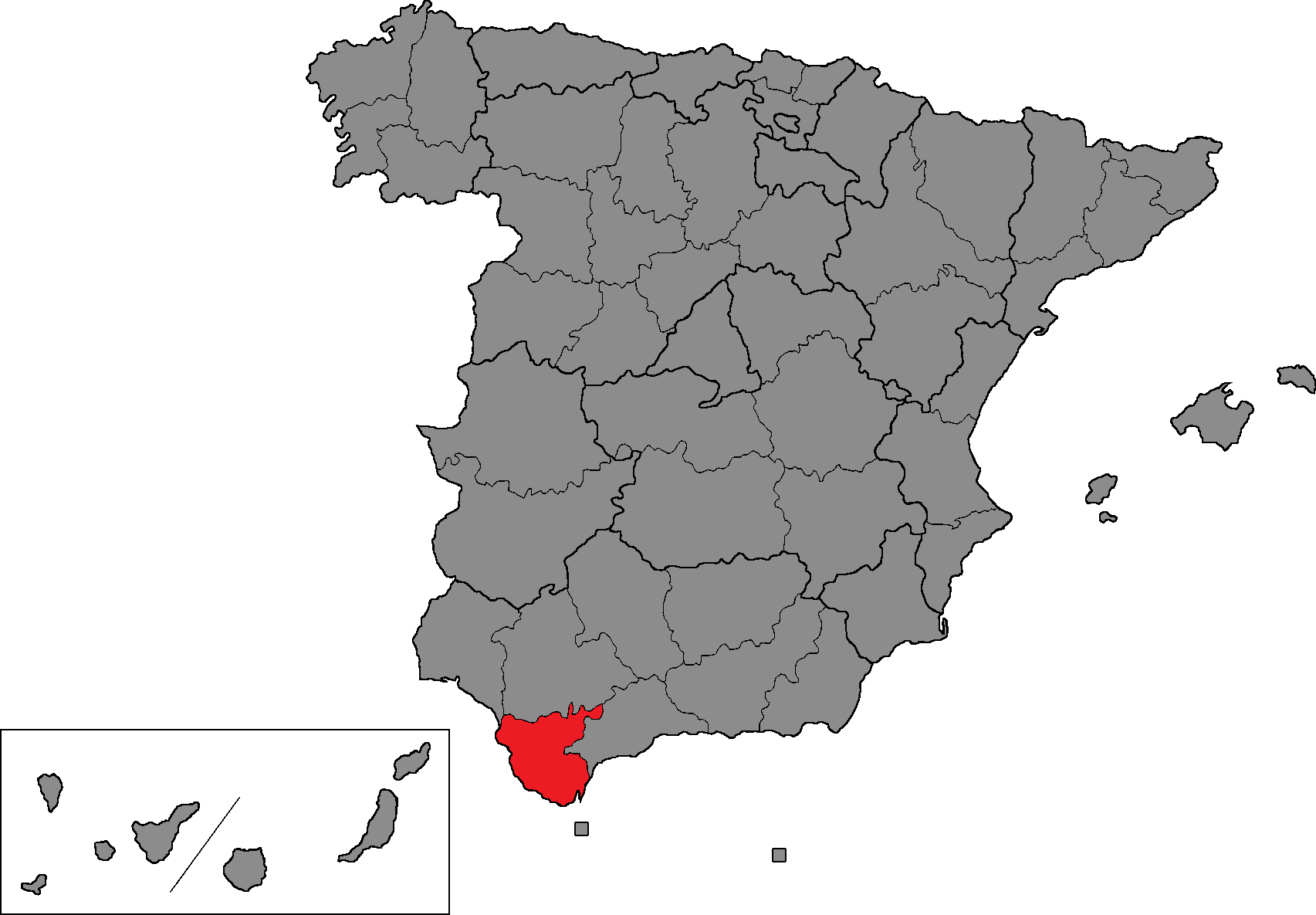
- Location of Cádiz within Spain
- Province: Cádiz
- Autonomous community: Andalusia
- Population: ▲1,254,291 (2024)
- Electorate: ▲1,017,958 (2023)
- Major settlements: Jerez de la Frontera, Cádiz, Algeciras, San Fernando, El Puerto de Santa María

Current constituency
- Created: 1977
- Seats: 8 (1977–1986); 9 (1986–2011); 8 (2011–2015); 9 (2015–present)
- Members: PP (4); PSOE (3); Vox (1); Sumar (1)

Cádiz is one of the 52 constituencies represented in the Congress of Deputies, the lower chamber of the Spanish parliament, the Cortes Generales. The constituency (whose boundaries correspond to those of the homonymous province) currently elects nine deputies. The electoral system uses the D'Hondt method and closed-list proportional voting, with a minimum threshold of three percent.

== Electoral system ==
The constituency was created as per the Political Reform Law and was first contested in the 1977 general election. The Law provided for the provinces of Spain to be established as multi-member districts in the Congress of Deputies, with this regulation being maintained under the Spanish Constitution of 1978. Additionally, the Constitution requires for any modification of the provincial limits to be approved under an organic law, needing an absolute majority in the Cortes Generales.

Voting is based on universal suffrage, comprising all Spanish nationals over 18 years of age with full political rights, provided that they have not been deprived of the right to vote by a final sentence. The only exception was in 1977, when this was limited to nationals over 21 years of age and in full enjoyment of their political and civil rights. Amendments in 2011 required non-resident citizens to apply for voting, a system known as "begged" voting (Spanish: Voto rogado). which was abolished in 2022. Further, amendments in 2018 granted the right to vote to those legally incapacitated. The Congress of Deputies has a minimum of 300 and a maximum of 400 seats, with electoral provisions fixing its size at 350. Of these, 348 are elected in 50 multi-member constituencies corresponding to the provinces of Spain—each of which is assigned an initial minimum of two seats and the remaining 248 distributed in proportion to population—using the D'Hondt method and closed-list proportional voting, with a three percent-threshold of valid votes (including blank ballots) in each constituency. The remaining two seats are allocated to Ceuta and Melilla as single-member districts elected by plurality voting. The use of this electoral method may result in a higher effective threshold depending on district magnitude and vote distribution. The law does not provide for by-elections to fill vacant seats; instead, any vacancies arising after the proclamation of candidates and during the legislative term are filled by the next candidates on the party lists or, when required, by designated substitutes.

The electoral law allows for parties and federations registered in the interior ministry, alliances and groupings of electors to present lists of candidates. Parties and federations intending to form an alliance are required to inform the relevant electoral commission within 10 days of the election call—15 before 1985—whereas groupings of electors need to secure the signature of at least one percent of the electorate in the constituencies for which they seek election—one permille of the electorate, with a compulsory minimum of 500 signatures, until 1985—disallowing electors from signing for more than one list. Also since 2011, parties, federations or alliances that have not obtained a mandate in either chamber of the Cortes at the preceding election are required to secure the signature of at least 0.1 percent of electors in the aforementioned constituencies. Amendments in 2007 required a balanced composition of men and women in the electoral lists, so that candidates of either sex made up at least 40 percent of the total composition; further amendments in 2024 required the use of a zipper system.

== Deputies ==
Deputies 1977–present
Key to parties PCE IU IULV–CA U.Podemos Podemos Sumar PA PSP PSOE Cs UCD PP CP AP Vox
Legislature	Election	Distribution
Constituent	1977	1 / 1 / 4 / 2
1st	1979	1 / 2 / 3 / 2
2nd	1982	6 / 2
3rd	1986	7 / 2
4th	1989	1 / 1 / 6 / 1
5th	1993	1 / 5 / 3
6th	1996	1 / 4 / 4
7th	2000	1 / 4 / 4
8th	2004	6 / 3
9th	2008	5 / 4
10th	2011	3 / 5
11th	2015	2 / 3 / 1 / 3
12th	2016	2 / 3 / 1 / 3
13th	2019 (Apr)	2 / 3 / 2 / 1 / 1
14th	2019 (Nov)	1 / 3 / 1 / 2 / 2
15th	2023	1 / 3 / 4 / 1

== General elections ==
=== 2026 ===
Summary of the 29 November 2026 Congress of Deputies election results in Cádiz
Parties and alliances	Popular vote			Seats	
Parties and alliances	Votes	%	±pp	Total	+/−
People's Party (PP)					
Spanish Socialist Workers' Party (PSOE)					
Vox (Vox)					
Andalusian Broad Front (FA)^{1}			n/a		
We Can (Podemos)^{1}			n/a		
Forward Andalusia (Adelante Andalucía)					
Animalist Party with the Environment (PACMA)					
Workers' Front (FO)					
For a Fairer World (M+J)					
The Party is Over (SALF)			New		
Communist Party of the Workers of Spain (PCTE)			New		
Blank ballots					
Total				8	–1
Valid votes					
Invalid votes					
Votes cast / turnout					
Abstentions					
Registered voters	1,042,157				
Sources
Footnotes: ^{1} Within the Unite Andalusia alliance in the 2023 election.

=== 2023 ===
Summary of the 23 July 2023 Congress of Deputies election results in Cádiz
Parties and alliances	Popular vote			Seats	
Parties and alliances	Votes	%	±pp	Total	+/−
People's Party (PP)	221,703	34.80	+16.77	4	+2
Spanish Socialist Workers' Party (PSOE)	211,200	33.15	+2.59	3	±0
Vox (Vox)	96,720	15.18	–6.12	1	–1
Unite Andalusia (Sumar)^{1}	82,115	12.89	–4.13	1	±0
Forward Andalusia (Adelante Andalucía)	9,191	1.44	New	0	±0
Animalist Party with the Environment (PACMA)^{2}	5,937	0.93	–0.44	0	±0
Workers' Front (FO)	1,225	0.19	New	0	±0
Walking Together (CJ)	745	0.12	New	0	±0
For a Fairer World (PUM+J)	673	0.11	±0.00	0	±0
Zero Cuts (Recortes Cero)	486	0.08	–0.07	0	±0
Citizens–Party of the Citizenry (Cs)	n/a	n/a	–9.01	0	–1
Blank ballots	7,103	1.11	–0.39		
Total	637,098			9	±0
Valid votes	637,098	98.81	+0.11		
Invalid votes	7,703	1.19	–0.11		
Votes cast / turnout	644,801	63.34	+1.06		
Abstentions	373,157	36.66	–1.06		
Registered voters	1,017,958				
Sources
Footnotes: ^{1} Unite Andalusia results are compared to the combined totals of United We Can and More Country–Andalusia in the November 2019 election.; ^{2} Animalist Party with the Environment results are compared to Animalist Party Against Mistreatment of Animals totals in the November 2019 election.

=== November 2019 ===
Summary of the 10 November 2019 Congress of Deputies election results in Cádiz
Parties and alliances	Popular vote			Seats	
Parties and alliances	Votes	%	±pp	Total	+/−
Spanish Socialist Workers' Party (PSOE)	188,271	30.56	–0.92	3	±0
Vox (Vox)	131,205	21.30	+8.20	2	+1
People's Party (PP)	111,089	18.03	+3.14	2	+1
United We Can (Podemos–IULV–CA)	93,541	15.18	–1.42	1	–1
Citizens–Party of the Citizenry (Cs)	55,490	9.01	–10.70	1	–1
More Country–Andalusia (Más País–Andalucía)	11,316	1.84	New	0	±0
Animalist Party Against Mistreatment of Animals (PACMA)	8,437	1.37	–0.29	0	±0
Andalusia by Herself (AxSí)	3,509	0.57	–0.07	0	±0
Spanish Communist Workers' Party (PCOE)	1,739	0.28	–0.05	0	±0
Zero Cuts–Green Group (Recortes Cero–GV)	915	0.15	–0.09	0	±0
For a Fairer World (PUM+J)	707	0.11	New	0	±0
Communist Party of the Andalusian People (PCPA)	639	0.10	–0.02	0	±0
Blank ballots	9,221	1.50	+0.27		
Total	616,079			9	±0
Valid votes	616,079	98.70	–0.06		
Invalid votes	8,116	1.30	+0.06		
Votes cast / turnout	624,195	62.28	–5.31		
Abstentions	378,100	37.72	+5.31		
Registered voters	1,002,295				

=== April 2019 ===
Summary of the 28 April 2019 Congress of Deputies election results in Cádiz
Parties and alliances	Popular vote			Seats	
Parties and alliances	Votes	%	±pp	Total	+/−
Spanish Socialist Workers' Party (PSOE)	210,131	31.48	+2.98	3	±0
Citizens–Party of the Citizenry (Cs)	131,567	19.71	+5.41	2	+1
United We Can (Podemos–IULV–CA–Equo)	110,807	16.60	–4.62	2	±0
People's Party (PP)	99,394	14.89	–17.41	1	–2
Vox (Vox)	87,438	13.10	+12.90	1	+1
Animalist Party Against Mistreatment of Animals (PACMA)	11,079	1.66	+0.08	0	±0
Andalusia by Herself (AxSí)	4,284	0.64	New	0	±0
Spanish Communist Workers' Party (PCOE)	2,224	0.33	New	0	±0
Zero Cuts–Green Group (Recortes Cero–GV)	1,620	0.24	+0.01	0	±0
Communist Party of the Andalusian People (PCPA)	812	0.12	±0.00	0	±0
Blank ballots	8,206	1.23	+0.10		
Total	667,562			9	±0
Valid votes	667,562	98.76	–0.20		
Invalid votes	8,350	1.24	+0.20		
Votes cast / turnout	675,912	67.59	+4.97		
Abstentions	324,125	32.41	–4.97		
Registered voters	1,000,037				

=== 2016 ===
Summary of the 26 June 2016 Congress of Deputies election results in Cádiz
Parties and alliances	Popular vote			Seats	
Parties and alliances	Votes	%	±pp	Total	+/−
People's Party (PP)	198,876	32.30	+4.56	3	±0
Spanish Socialist Workers' Party (PSOE)	175,498	28.50	+0.52	3	±0
United We Can for Andalusia (Podemos–IU–Equo)^{1}	130,643	21.22	–5.01	2	±0
Citizens–Party of the Citizenry (C's)	88,029	14.30	–0.39	1	±0
Animalist Party Against Mistreatment of Animals (PACMA)	9,719	1.58	+0.41	0	±0
Union, Progress and Democracy (UPyD)	1,750	0.28	–0.28	0	±0
Zero Cuts–Green Group (Recortes Cero–GV)	1,417	0.23	+0.07	0	±0
Vox (Vox)	1,253	0.20	–0.03	0	±0
Communist Party of the Peoples of Spain (PCPE)	767	0.12	±0.00	0	±0
Spanish Phalanx of the CNSO (FE de las JONS)	472	0.08	New	0	±0
Libertarian Party (P–LIB)	393	0.06	–0.01	0	±0
Blank ballots	6,938	1.13	+0.08		
Total	615,755			9	±0
Valid votes	615,755	98.96	–0.14		
Invalid votes	6,497	1.04	+0.14		
Votes cast / turnout	622,252	62.62	–3.04		
Abstentions	371,437	37.38	+3.04		
Registered voters	993,689				
Sources
Footnotes: ^{1} United We Can results are compared to the combined totals of We Can and United Left/Greens–Assembly for Andalusia–Popular Unity in Common in the 2015 election.

=== 2015 ===
Summary of the 20 December 2015 Congress of Deputies election results in Cádiz
Parties and alliances	Popular vote			Seats	
Parties and alliances	Votes	%	±pp	Total	+/−
Spanish Socialist Workers' Party (PSOE)	180,895	27.98	–4.79	3	±0
People's Party (PP)	179,319	27.74	–19.32	3	–2
We Can (Podemos)	130,734	20.22	New	2	+2
Citizens–Party of the Citizenry (C's)	94,962	14.69	New	1	+1
United Left/Greens–Assembly for Andalusia–Popular Unity (IULV–CA–UPeC)	38,881	6.01	–2.74	0	±0
Animalist Party Against Mistreatment of Animals (PACMA)	7,591	1.17	+0.71	0	±0
Union, Progress and Democracy (UPyD)	3,637	0.56	–4.24	0	±0
Vox (Vox)	1,493	0.23	New	0	±0
Zero Cuts–Green Group (Recortes Cero–GV)	1,042	0.16	New	0	±0
Communist Party of the Peoples of Spain (PCPE)	780	0.12	–0.05	0	±0
Libertarian Party (P–LIB)	422	0.07	New	0	±0
Blank ballots	6,781	1.05	–0.32		
Total	646,537			9	+1
Valid votes	646,537	99.10	–0.01		
Invalid votes	5,863	0.90	+0.01		
Votes cast / turnout	652,400	65.66	+1.87		
Abstentions	341,218	34.34	–1.87		
Registered voters	993,618				

=== 2011 ===
Summary of the 20 November 2011 Congress of Deputies election results in Cádiz
Parties and alliances	Popular vote			Seats	
Parties and alliances	Votes	%	±pp	Total	+/−
People's Party (PP)	291,897	47.06	+8.85	5	+1
Spanish Socialist Workers' Party (PSOE)	203,251	32.77	–18.34	3	–2
United Left/The Greens–Assembly for Andalusia: Plural Left (IULV–CA)	54,262	8.75	+3.94	0	±0
Union, Progress and Democracy (UPyD)	29,761	4.80	+3.93	0	±0
Andalusian Party (PA)^{1}	19,289	3.11	+0.61	0	±0
Equo (Equo)	4,345	0.70	New	0	±0
Animalist Party Against Mistreatment of Animals (PACMA)	2,872	0.46	+0.22	0	±0
Blank Seats (EB)	2,329	0.38	New	0	±0
Communist Party of the Peoples of Spain (PCPE)	1,072	0.17	+0.05	0	±0
Hartos.org (Hartos.org)	921	0.15	New	0	±0
Anti-capitalists (Anticapitalistas)	874	0.14	New	0	±0
Internet Party (Internet)	603	0.10	New	0	±0
Communist Unification of Spain (UCE)	265	0.04	New	0	±0
Blank ballots	8,511	1.37	+0.34		
Total	620,252			8	–1
Valid votes	620,252	99.11	–0.25		
Invalid votes	5,539	0.89	+0.25		
Votes cast / turnout	625,791	63.79	–3.65		
Abstentions	355,270	36.21	+3.65		
Registered voters	981,061				
Sources
Footnotes: ^{1} Andalusian Party results are compared to Andalusian Coalition totals in the 2008 election.

=== 2008 ===
Summary of the 9 March 2008 Congress of Deputies election results in Cádiz
Parties and alliances	Popular vote			Seats	
Parties and alliances	Votes	%	±pp	Total	+/−
Spanish Socialist Workers' Party (PSOE)	328,822	51.11	+0.44	5	–1
People's Party (PP)	245,830	38.21	+4.59	4	+1
United Left/The Greens–Assembly for Andalusia–Alternative (IULV–CA)	30,958	4.81	–1.19	0	±0
Andalusian Coalition (CA)^{1}	16,058	2.50	–4.27	0	±0
Union, Progress and Democracy (UPyD)	5,572	0.87	New	0	±0
The Greens (Verdes)	2,531	0.39	New	0	±0
Anti-Bullfighting Party Against Mistreatment of Animals (PACMA)	1,547	0.24	New	0	±0
Social Democratic Party (PSD)	1,085	0.17	New	0	±0
Communist Party of the Peoples of Spain (PCPE)	795	0.12	+0.12	0	±0
For a Fairer World (PUM+J)	629	0.10	New	0	±0
Citizens–Party of the Citizenry (C's)	558	0.09	New	0	±0
Humanist Party (PH)	389	0.06	–0.05	0	±0
Family and Life Party (PFyV)	374	0.06	New	0	±0
National Democracy (DN)	368	0.06	–0.01	0	±0
Spanish Alternative (AES)	343	0.05	New	0	±0
Christian Positivist Party (PPCr)	300	0.05	–0.03	0	±0
Spanish Phalanx of the CNSO (FE de las JONS)	291	0.05	–0.03	0	±0
Authentic Phalanx (FA)	219	0.03	New	0	±0
Blank ballots	6,639	1.03	–0.78		
Total	643,308			9	±0
Valid votes	643,308	99.36	+0.07		
Invalid votes	4,140	0.64	–0.07		
Votes cast / turnout	647,448	67.44	–2.47		
Abstentions	312,585	32.56	+2.47		
Registered voters	960,033				
Sources
Footnotes: ^{1} Andalusian Coalition results are compared to the combined totals of Andalusian Party and Socialist Party of Andalusia in the 2004 election.

=== 2004 ===
Summary of the 14 March 2004 Congress of Deputies election results in Cádiz
Parties and alliances	Popular vote			Seats	
Parties and alliances	Votes	%	±pp	Total	+/−
Spanish Socialist Workers' Party (PSOE)	326,152	50.67	+11.27	6	+2
People's Party (PP)	216,416	33.62	–7.56	3	–1
United Left/The Greens–Assembly for Andalusia (IULV–CA)	38,611	6.00	–0.66	0	±0
Andalusian Party (PA)	33,592	5.22	–4.64	0	–1
Socialist Party of Andalusia (PSA)	9,975	1.55	New	0	±0
Party of Precarious Workers (PTPRE)	1,355	0.21	New	0	±0
Citizens for Blank Votes (CenB)	1,089	0.17	New	0	±0
Andalusia Assembly (A)	739	0.11	+0.01	0	±0
Humanist Party (PH)	713	0.11	±0.00	0	±0
Republican Left (IR)	670	0.10	New	0	±0
Democratic and Social Centre (CDS)	536	0.08	+0.01	0	±0
Christian Positivist Party (PPCr)	500	0.08	–0.02	0	±0
Spanish Phalanx of the CNSO (FE de las JONS)^{1}	494	0.08	+0.02	0	±0
National Democracy (DN)	477	0.07	New	0	±0
The Phalanx (FE)	377	0.06	±0.00	0	±0
Republican Social Movement (MSR)	309	0.05	New	0	±0
Communist Party of the Peoples of Spain (PCPE)	0	0.00	New	0	±0
Blank ballots	11,634	1.81	+0.60		
Total	643,639			9	±0
Valid votes	643,639	99.29	+0.12		
Invalid votes	4,577	0.71	–0.12		
Votes cast / turnout	648,216	69.91	+6.82		
Abstentions	278,961	30.09	–6.82		
Registered voters	927,177				
Sources
Footnotes: ^{1} Spanish Phalanx of the CNSO results are compared to Independent Spanish Phalanx–Phalanx 2000 totals in the 2000 election.

=== 2000 ===
Summary of the 12 March 2000 Congress of Deputies election results in Cádiz
Parties and alliances	Popular vote			Seats	
Parties and alliances	Votes	%	±pp	Total	+/−
People's Party (PP)	228,024	41.18	+5.81	4	±0
Spanish Socialist Workers' Party–Progressives (PSOE–p)	218,133	39.40	–4.49	4	±0
Andalusian Party (PA)	54,570	9.86	+3.79	1	+1
United Left/The Greens–Assembly for Andalusia (IULV–CA)	36,851	6.66	–6.51	0	–1
Liberal Independent Group (GIL)	3,006	0.54	New	0	±0
Andalusian Left (IA)	1,887	0.34	New	0	±0
Andalusian Nation (NA)	667	0.12	–0.03	0	±0
Humanist Party (PH)	596	0.11	+0.02	0	±0
Christian Positivist Party (PPCr)	546	0.10	New	0	±0
Andalusia Assembly (A)	527	0.10	New	0	±0
Natural Law Party (PLN)	487	0.09	New	0	±0
Centrist Union–Democratic and Social Centre (UC–CDS)	401	0.07	–0.02	0	±0
Spain 2000 Platform (ES2000)	342	0.06	New	0	±0
The Phalanx (FE)	338	0.06	New	0	±0
Independent Spanish Phalanx–Phalanx 2000 (FEI–FE 2000)	321	0.06	New	0	±0
Spanish Democratic Party (PADE)	279	0.05	New	0	±0
Blank ballots	6,692	1.21	+0.38		
Total	553,667			9	±0
Valid votes	553,667	99.17	–0.02		
Invalid votes	4,653	0.83	+0.02		
Votes cast / turnout	558,320	63.09	–10.19		
Abstentions	326,674	36.91	+10.19		
Registered voters	884,994				

=== 1996 ===
Summary of the 3 March 1996 Congress of Deputies election results in Cádiz
Parties and alliances	Popular vote			Seats	
Parties and alliances	Votes	%	±pp	Total	+/−
Spanish Socialist Workers' Party of Andalusia (PSOE–A)	270,237	43.89	–6.08	4	–1
People's Party (PP)	217,795	35.37	+7.64	4	+1
United Left/The Greens–Assembly for Andalusia (IULV–CA)	81,116	13.17	+2.20	1	±0
Andalusian Party (PA)^{1}	37,356	6.07	–1.59	0	±0
Communist Party of the Andalusian People (PCPA)	925	0.15	+0.02	0	±0
Andalusian Nation (NA)	905	0.15	New	0	±0
Workers' Revolutionary Party (PRT)^{2}	576	0.09	–0.13	0	±0
Authentic Spanish Phalanx (FEA)	574	0.09	New	0	±0
Centrist Union (UC)	574	0.09	–0.67	0	±0
Humanist Party (PH)	573	0.09	+0.06	0	±0
Blank ballots	5,126	0.83	+0.29		
Total	615,757			9	±0
Valid votes	615,757	99.19	–0.21		
Invalid votes	5,005	0.81	+0.21		
Votes cast / turnout	620,762	73.28	+2.50		
Abstentions	226,362	26.72	–2.50		
Registered voters	847,124				
Sources
Footnotes: ^{1} Andalusian Party results are compared to the combined totals of Andalusian Party and Andalusian Progress Party in the 1993 election.; ^{2} Workers' Revolutionary Party results are compared to Workers' Socialist Party totals in the 1993 election.

=== 1993 ===
Summary of the 6 June 1993 Congress of Deputies election results in Cádiz
Parties and alliances	Popular vote			Seats	
Parties and alliances	Votes	%	±pp	Total	+/−
Spanish Socialist Workers' Party of Andalusia (PSOE–A)	280,715	49.97	–1.91	5	–1
People's Party (PP)	155,785	27.73	+11.39	3	+2
United Left–Assembly for Andalusia (IU–CA)	61,604	10.97	+1.41	1	±0
Andalusian Progress Party (PAP)	27,225	4.85	New	0	±0
Andalusian Party (PA)	15,786	2.81	–8.52	0	–1
Democratic and Social Centre (CDS)	4,287	0.76	–3.48	0	±0
The Greens of Andalusia (Verdes)^{1}	3,518	0.63	–0.21	0	±0
Ruiz-Mateos Group–European Democratic Alliance (ARM–ADE)	2,732	0.49	–2.97	0	±0
Liberal Independent Group (GIL)	2,455	0.44	New	0	±0
The Ecologists (LE)	1,620	0.29	–0.30	0	±0
Workers' Socialist Party (PST)	1,250	0.22	–0.16	0	±0
Communist Party of the Andalusian People (PCPA)	740	0.13	–0.05	0	±0
Spanish Phalanx of the CNSO (FE–JONS)	345	0.06	–0.05	0	±0
Natural Law Party (PLN)	279	0.05	New	0	±0
Coalition for a New Socialist Party (CNPS)^{2}	215	0.04	–0.05	0	±0
Humanist Party (PH)	189	0.03	–0.05	0	±0
Communist Unification of Spain (UCE)	0	0.00	New	0	±0
Blank ballots	3,054	0.54	+0.01		
Total	561,799			9	±0
Valid votes	561,799	99.40	+0.22		
Invalid votes	3,415	0.60	–0.22		
Votes cast / turnout	565,214	70.78	+7.63		
Abstentions	233,308	29.22	–7.63		
Registered voters	798,522				
Sources
Footnotes: ^{1} The Greens of Andalusia results are compared to The Greens–Green List totals in the 1989 election.; ^{2} Coalition for a New Socialist Party results are compared to Alliance for the Republic totals in the 1989 election.

=== 1989 ===
Summary of the 29 October 1989 Congress of Deputies election results in Cádiz
Parties and alliances	Popular vote			Seats	
Parties and alliances	Votes	%	±pp	Total	+/−
Spanish Socialist Workers' Party of Andalusia (PSOE–A)	243,410	51.88	–8.84	6	–1
People's Party (PP)^{1}	76,688	16.34	–3.46	1	–1
Andalusian Party (PA)	53,173	11.33	+7.15	1	+1
United Left–Assembly for Andalusia (IU–CA)	44,871	9.56	+3.72	1	+1
Democratic and Social Centre (CDS)	19,905	4.24	–1.30	0	±0
Ruiz-Mateos Group (Ruiz-Mateos)	16,225	3.46	New	0	±0
The Greens–Green List (LV–LV)	3,928	0.84	New	0	±0
The Ecologist Greens (LVE)	2,791	0.59	New	0	±0
Workers' Socialist Party (PST)	1,789	0.38	–0.07	0	±0
Workers' Party of Spain–Communist Unity (PTE–UC)^{2}	1,501	0.32	–0.47	0	±0
Communist Party of the Andalusian People (PCPA)	861	0.18	New	0	±0
Spanish Phalanx of the CNSO (FE–JONS)	515	0.11	–0.19	0	±0
Alliance for the Republic (AxR)^{3}	408	0.09	–0.12	0	±0
Humanist Party (PH)	383	0.08	New	0	±0
Centrist Unity–Democratic Spanish Party (PED)	276	0.06	New	0	±0
Blank ballots	2,464	0.53	+0.02		
Total	469,188			9	±0
Valid votes	469,188	99.18	+0.91		
Invalid votes	3,896	0.82	–0.91		
Votes cast / turnout	473,084	63.15	–3.19		
Abstentions	276,097	36.85	+3.19		
Registered voters	749,181				
Sources
Footnotes: ^{1} People's Party results are compared to People's Coalition totals in the 1986 election.; ^{2} Workers' Party of Spain–Communist Unity results are compared to Communists' Unity Board totals in the 1986 election.; ^{3} Alliance for the Republic results are compared to Internationalist Socialist Workers' Party totals in the 1986 election.

=== 1986 ===
Summary of the 22 June 1986 Congress of Deputies election results in Cádiz
Parties and alliances	Popular vote			Seats	
Parties and alliances	Votes	%	±pp	Total	+/−
Spanish Socialist Workers' Party (PSOE)	286,104	60.72	–2.95	7	+1
People's Coalition (AP–PDP–PL)^{1}	93,284	19.80	–0.28	2	±0
United Left (IU)^{2}	27,527	5.84	+1.56	0	±0
Democratic and Social Centre (CDS)	26,080	5.54	+3.79	0	±0
Andalusian Party (PA)	19,682	4.18	+0.74	0	±0
Communists' Unity Board (MUC)	3,743	0.79	New	0	±0
Democratic Reformist Party (PRD)	3,234	0.69	New	0	±0
Socialist Party of the Andalusian People (PSPA)	2,186	0.46	New	0	±0
Workers' Socialist Party (PST)	2,117	0.45	–0.27	0	±0
Spanish Phalanx of the CNSO (FE–JONS)	1,419	0.30	New	0	±0
Internationalist Socialist Workers' Party (POSI)	994	0.21	New	0	±0
Communist Unification of Spain (UCE)	961	0.20	+0.09	0	±0
Republican Popular Unity (UPR)^{3}	938	0.20	+0.10	0	±0
Party of the Communists of Catalonia (PCC)	489	0.10	New	0	±0
Blank ballots	2,416	0.51	+0.22		
Total	471,174			9	+1
Valid votes	471,174	98.27	–0.13		
Invalid votes	8,290	1.73	+0.13		
Votes cast / turnout	479,464	66.34	–9.33		
Abstentions	243,282	33.66	+9.33		
Registered voters	722,746				
Sources
Footnotes: ^{1} People's Coalition results are compared to People's Alliance–People's Democratic Party totals in the 1982 election.; ^{2} United Left results are compared to Communist Party of Andalusia totals in the 1982 election.; ^{3} Republican Popular Unity results are compared to Communist Party of Spain (Marxist–Leninist) totals in the 1982 election.

=== 1982 ===
Summary of the 28 October 1982 Congress of Deputies election results in Cádiz
Parties and alliances	Popular vote			Seats	
Parties and alliances	Votes	%	±pp	Total	+/−
Spanish Socialist Workers' Party of Andalusia (PSA–PSOE)	308,571	63.67	+33.55	6	+3
People's Alliance–People's Democratic Party (AP–PDP)^{1}	97,314	20.08	+16.83	2	+2
Union of the Democratic Centre (UCD)	22,728	4.69	–24.73	0	–2
Communist Party of Andalusia (PCA–PCE)	20,749	4.28	–6.31	0	–1
Socialist Party of Andalusia–Andalusian Party (PSA–PA)	16,654	3.44	–16.27	0	–2
Democratic and Social Centre (CDS)	8,473	1.75	New	0	±0
Workers' Socialist Party (PST)	3,474	0.72	New	0	±0
Spanish Communist Workers' Party (PCOE)	1,753	0.36	New	0	±0
New Force (FN)^{2}	1,209	0.25	–0.85	0	±0
Spanish Solidarity (SE)	902	0.19	New	0	±0
Communist Unification of Spain (UCE)	531	0.11	New	0	±0
Communist Party of Spain (Marxist–Leninist) (PCE (m–l))	498	0.10	New	0	±0
Falangist Movement of Spain (MFE)	352	0.07	New	0	±0
Socialist Party (PS)^{3}	0	0.00	–0.42	0	±0
Communist Movement of Andalusia (MCA)	0	0.00	–0.25	0	±0
Revolutionary Communist League (LCR)	0	0.00	–0.19	0	±0
Blank ballots	1,421	0.29	+0.06		
Total	484,629			8	±0
Valid votes	484,629	98.40	+0.31		
Invalid votes	7,880	1.60	–0.31		
Votes cast / turnout	492,509	75.67	+10.11		
Abstentions	158,397	24.33	–10.11		
Registered voters	650,906				
Sources
Footnotes: ^{1} People's Alliance–People's Democratic Party results are compared to Democratic Coalition totals in the 1979 election.; ^{2} New Force results are compared to National Union totals in the 1979 election.; ^{3} Socialist Party results are compared to Spanish Socialist Workers' Party (historical) totals in the 1979 election.

=== 1979 ===
Summary of the 1 March 1979 Congress of Deputies election results in Cádiz
Parties and alliances	Popular vote			Seats	
Parties and alliances	Votes	%	±pp	Total	+/−
Spanish Socialist Workers' Party (PSOE)^{1}	124,693	30.12	–16.12	3	–2
Union of the Democratic Centre (UCD)	121,800	29.42	+2.10	2	±0
Socialist Party of Andalusia–Andalusian Party (PSA–PA)	81,598	19.71	New	2	+2
Communist Party of Spain (PCE)	43,824	10.59	+0.48	1	±0
Democratic Coalition (CD)^{2}	13,465	3.25	–1.69	0	±0
Party of Labour of Spain (PTE)^{3}	13,254	3.20	+0.59	0	±0
National Union (UN)^{4}	4,538	1.10	+0.62	0	±0
Spanish Socialist Workers' Party (historical) (PSOEh)	1,732	0.42	New	0	±0
Workers' Communist Party (PCT)	1,458	0.35	New	0	±0
Communist Organization of Spain (Red Flag) (OCE–BR)	1,133	0.27	New	0	±0
Communist Movement–Organization of Communist Left (MC–OIC)	1,040	0.25	New	0	±0
Workers' Revolutionary Organization (ORT)	970	0.23	New	0	±0
Revolutionary Communist League (LCR)^{5}	767	0.19	+0.13	0	±0
Republican Left (IR)	729	0.18	New	0	±0
Spanish Democratic Republican Action (ARDE)	707	0.17	New	0	±0
Carlist Party (PC)	661	0.16	New	0	±0
Spanish Phalanx of the CNSO (Authentic) (FE–JONS(A))	617	0.15	New	0	±0
Blank ballots	972	0.23	–0.11		
Total	413,958			8	±0
Valid votes	413,958	98.09	–0.01		
Invalid votes	8,053	1.91	+0.01		
Votes cast / turnout	422,011	65.56	–9.73		
Abstentions	221,720	34.44	+9.73		
Registered voters	643,731				
Sources
Footnotes: ^{1} Spanish Socialist Workers' Party results are compared to the combined totals of Spanish Socialist Workers' Party and People's Socialist Party–Socialist Unity in the 1977 election.; ^{2} Democratic Coalition results are compared to People's Alliance totals in the 1977 election.; ^{3} Party of Labour of Spain results are compared to Democratic Left Front totals in the 1977 election.; ^{4} National Union results are compared to Spanish Phalanx of the CNSO totals in the 1977 election.; ^{5} Revolutionary Communist League results are compared to Front for Workers' Unity totals in the 1977 election.

=== 1977 ===
Summary of the 15 June 1977 Congress of Deputies election results in Cádiz
Parties and alliances	Popular vote			Seats	
Parties and alliances	Votes	%	±pp	Total	+/−
Spanish Socialist Workers' Party (PSOE)	150,896	36.51	n/a	4	n/a
Union of the Democratic Centre (UCD)	112,927	27.32	n/a	2	n/a
Communist Party of Spain (PCE)	41,809	10.11	n/a	1	n/a
People's Socialist Party–Socialist Unity (PSP–US)	40,232	9.73	n/a	1	n/a
People's Alliance (AP)	20,424	4.94	n/a	0	n/a
Andalusian Regional Unity (URA)	13,396	3.24	n/a	0	n/a
Democratic Left Front (FDI)	10,808	2.61	n/a	0	n/a
Independent Candidacy (INDEP)	6,472	1.57	n/a	0	n/a
Federation of Christian Democracy (FPD–ID)	5,216	1.26	n/a	0	n/a
National Association for the Study of Current Problems (ANEPA–CP)	3,635	0.88	n/a	0	n/a
Spanish Social Reform (RSE)	2,404	0.58	n/a	0	n/a
Spanish Phalanx of the CNSO (FE–JONS)	1,979	0.48	n/a	0	n/a
Andalusian Socialist Movement (MSA)	1,498	0.36	n/a	0	n/a
Front for Workers' Unity (FUT)	254	0.06	n/a	0	n/a
Blank ballots	1,387	0.34	n/a		
Total	413,337			8	n/a
Valid votes	413,337	98.10	n/a		
Invalid votes	7,993	1.90	n/a		
Votes cast / turnout	421,330	75.29	n/a		
Abstentions	138,260	24.71	n/a		
Registered voters	559,590				

== Bibliography ==
- Ley 1/1977, de 4 de enero, para la Reforma Política (Fundamental Law 1/1977). Official State Gazette (in Spanish). 4 January 1977. BOE-A-1977-165.
- Real Decreto-ley 20/1977, de 18 de marzo, sobre Normas Electorales (Royal Decree-Law 20/1977). Official State Gazette (in Spanish). 18 March 1977. BOE-A-1977-7445.
- Constitución Española (Constitution). Official State Gazette (in Spanish). 27 December 1978. BOE-A-1978-31229.
- Ley Orgánica 5/1985, de 19 de junio, del Régimen Electoral General (Organic Law 5/1985). Official State Gazette (in Spanish). 19 June 1985. BOE-A-1985-11672.
- Carreras de Odriozola, Albert; Tafunell Sambola, Xavier (2005) [1989]. Estadísticas históricas de España, siglos XIX-XX (PDF) (in Spanish). Vol. 1 (II ed.). Bilbao: Fundación BBVA. pp. 1072–1097. ISBN 84-96515-00-1. Archived from the original (PDF) on 24 September 2015.
