= Minister for Culture (Sweden) =

Member and minister of the Swedish Government

Minister for Culture of Sweden
- Statsråd och chef för Kulturdepartementet
- Lesser coat of arms of Sweden

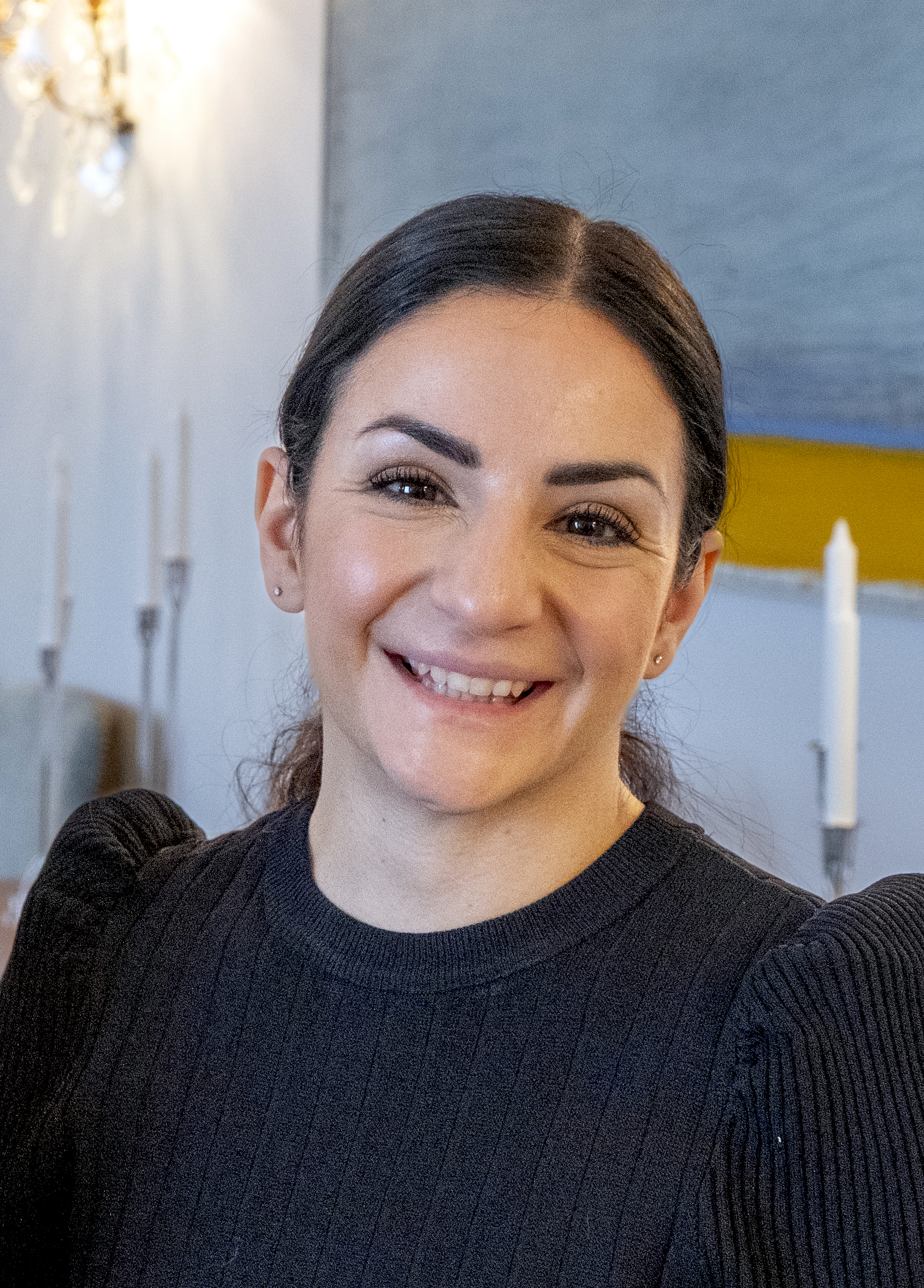
- Incumbent; Parisa Liljestrand since 18 October 2022
- Member of: The Government
- Appointer: The Prime Minister
- Term length: No fixed term, serves at the pleasure of the Prime Minister
- Inaugural holder: Bengt Göransson
- Formation: 8 October 1982
- Website: Official website

The Minister for Culture (formally cabinet minister and head of the Ministry for Culture) is a member and minister of the Swedish Government and appointed by the Prime Minister. The minister heads the Ministry for Culture and is responsible for cultural issues and construction.

Before 1 December 1991, the cultural issues were handled by the Ministry of Education. Between 1991 and 2004, and from 2006 it's a separate ministry. In the years between 2004 and 2006, the issues were handled by the Ministry of Education and Culture.

The current Minister for Culture is Parisa Liljestrand, who was appointed on 18 October 2022.

== List of ministers for culture ==
Color key

Independent Social Democrats Moderate Centre Left Liberals Christian Democrats Green Sweden Democrats

Status

Denotes acting Minister for Culture

No.	Portrait	Minister for Culture	Took office	Left office	Time in office	Party	Coalition	Cabinet
1	Bengt Göransson	Bengt Göransson (1932–2021)	8 October 1982	4 October 1991	8 years, 361 days	Social Democrats	S	Palme II; Carlsson I Carlsson II
2	Birgit Friggebo	Birgit Friggebo (born 1941)	4 October 1991	7 October 1994	3 years, 3 days	Liberals	M–C–L–KD	Bildt
3	Margot Wallström	Margot Wallström (born 1954)	7 October 1994	22 March 1996	1 year, 167 days	Social Democrats	S	Carlsson III
4	Marita Ulvskog	Marita Ulvskog (born 1951)	22 March 1996	13 September 2004	8 years, 175 days	Social Democrats	S	Persson
-	Pär Nuder	Pär Nuder (born 1963); Acting	13 September 2004	1 November 2004	49 days	Social Democrats	S	Persson
5	Leif Pagrotsky	Leif Pagrotsky (born 1951)	1 November 2004	6 October 2006	1 year, 339 days	Social Democrats	S	Persson
6	Cecilia Stegö Chilò	Cecilia Stegö Chilò (1959–2025)	6 October 2006	16 October 2006	10 days	Moderate	M–C–L–KD	Reinfeldt
-	Lars Leijonborg	Lars Leijonborg (born 1949); Acting	16 October 2006	24 October 2006	8 days	Liberals	M–C–L–KD	Reinfeldt
7	Lena Adelsohn Liljeroth	Lena Adelsohn Liljeroth (born 1955)	24 October 2006	3 October 2014	7 years, 344 days	Moderate	M–C–L–KD	Reinfeldt
8	Alice Bah Kuhnke	Alice Bah Kuhnke (born 1971)	3 October 2014	21 January 2019	4 years, 110 days	Green	S–MP	Löfven I
9	Amanda Lind	Amanda Lind (born 1980)	21 January 2019	30 November 2021	2 years, 313 days	Green	S–MP	Löfven II; Löfven III
10	Jeanette Gustafsdotter	Jeanette Gustafsdotter (born 1965)	30 November 2021	18 October 2022	322 days	Social Democrats	S	Andersson
11	Parisa Liljestrand	Parisa Liljestrand (born 1983)	18 October 2022	Incumbent	3 years, 324 days	Moderate	M–KD–L	Kristersson

=== Deputy ministers ===
Portrait	Minister for Culture (Born-Died)	Term			Political Party	Coalition	Cabinet
Portrait	Minister for Culture (Born-Died)	Took office	Left office	Duration	Political Party	Coalition	Cabinet
Ulrica Messing	Ulrica Messing (born 1968)	7 October 1998	21 October 2000	2 years, 14 days	Social Democrats	S	Persson

== See also ==
- Politics in Sweden
- Culture minister
- Ministry of Culture
