= Anders Wallner =

Swedish politician (born 1983)

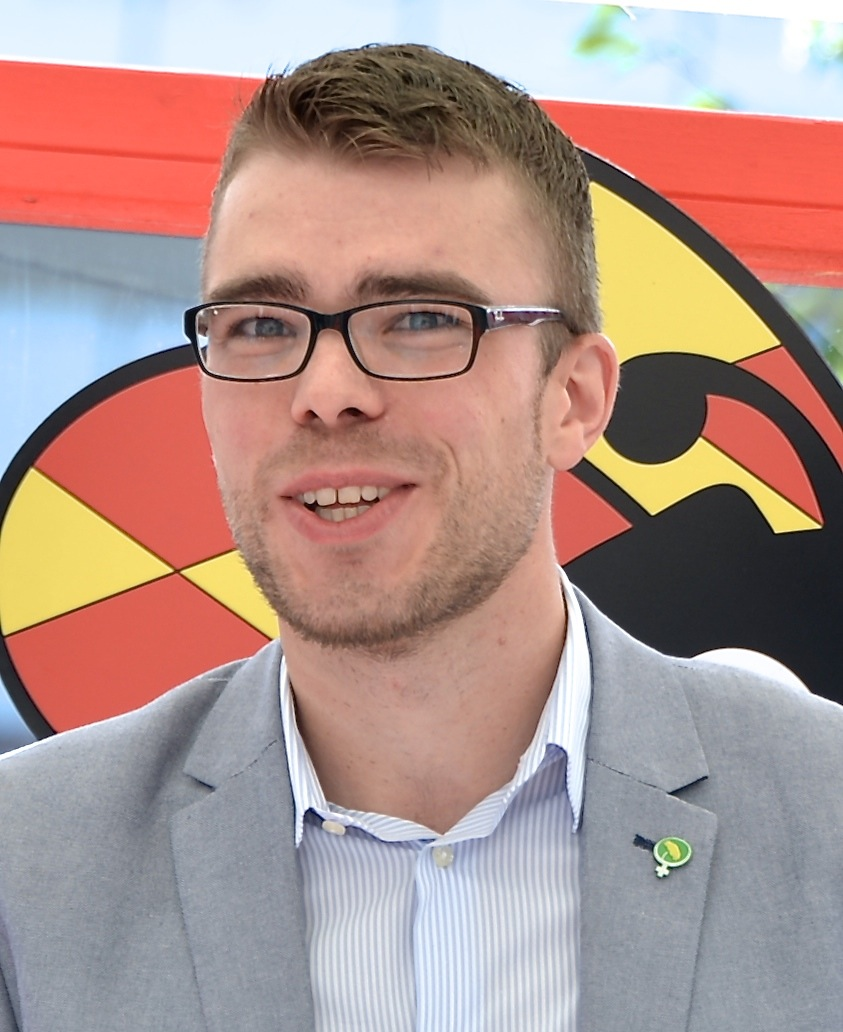
Anders Wallner

Anders Wallner, born 1983 in Bergsjö, Hälsingland, is a Swedish Green Party member, resident in Stockholm. He was party secretary (Swedish: partisekreterare) from 2011 to 2016.

Anders Wallner has previously held elected office on a local level in Malmö. From 2007 to 2008, he was a member of the party's ruling party board of directors. in 2010, he became a member of the Stockholm City Council. He was previously assistant to party spokesperson Maria Wetterstrand. In 2007, he was press officer for Stockholm Pride.

In May 2011, Anders Wallner was wounded in a stabbing at a subway station in Stockholm.
