= Ürgə =

Village and municipality in Lankaran district, Azerbaijan

Coordinates: 38°49′N 48°49′E

Ürgə is a village and municipality in the Lankaran Rayon of Azerbaijan. It has a population of 1,817.
