= Jeanette Gustafsdotter =

Swedish politician (born 1965)

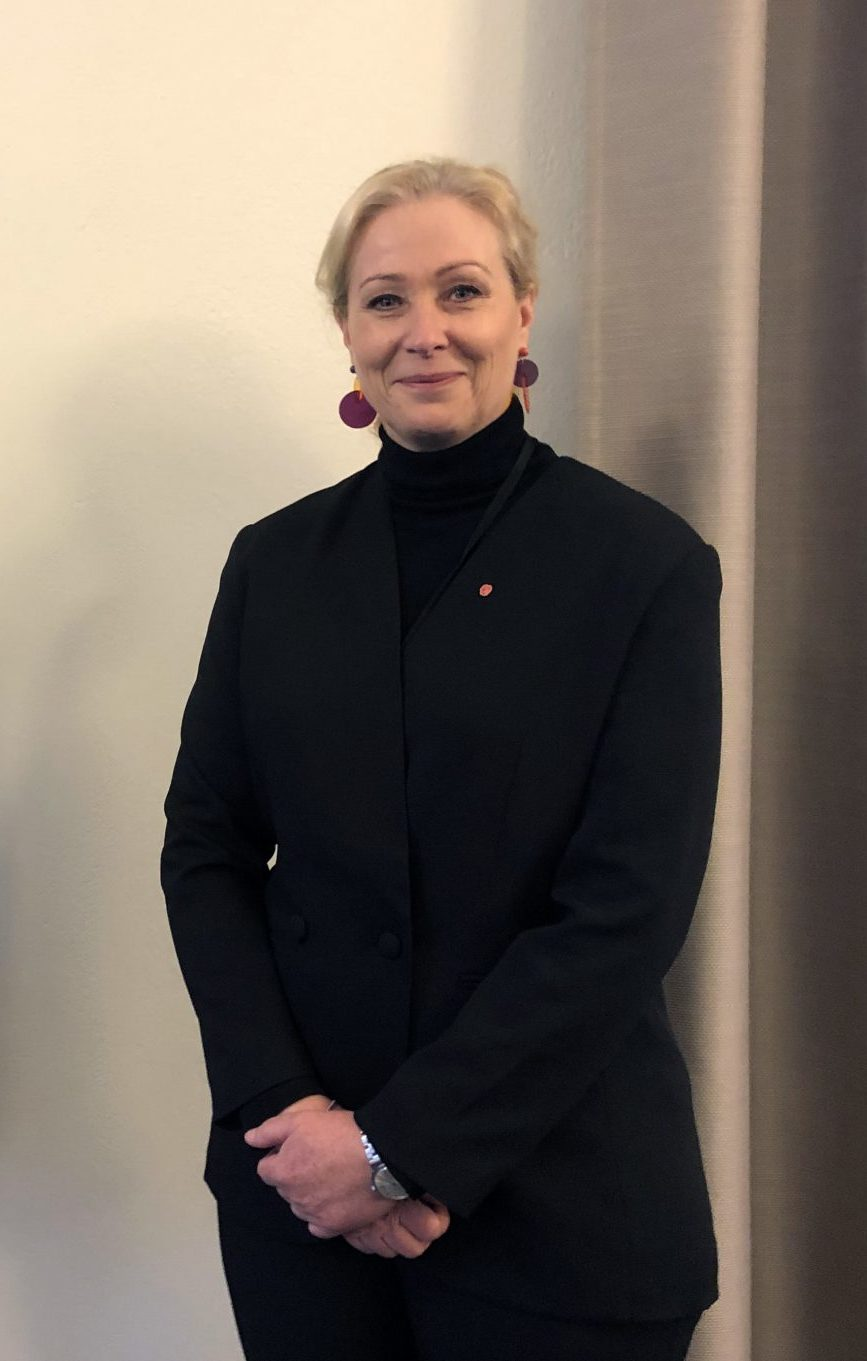

Minister for Culture
- In office 30 November 2021 – 18 October 2022
- Prime Minister: Magdalena Andersson
- Preceded by: Amanda Lind
- Succeeded by: Parisa Liljestrand

Secretary-general of the Swedish Museums Association
- In office 2020–2021

Personal details
- Born: 24 December 1965 (age 60)
- Party: Social Democratic
- Website: https://www.regeringen.se/sveriges-regering/kulturdepartementet/jeanette-gustafsdotter/

Eva Jeanette Gustafsdotter (born 24 December 1965) is a Swedish politician for the Social Democratic party. Between 30 November 2021 and 18 October 2022 she was the Minister of Culture in Magdalena Andersson's cabinet, replacing Amanda Lind.

Before being appointed as Minister of Culture, Gustafsdotter was the secretary-general of the Swedish Museums Association. At Mid Sweden University she supplemented her studies with journalism between 1992 and 1994, and in 2020 she graduated from Luleå University of Technology as a subject teacher for upper secondary school.
