= Internet Party (Spain) =

Internet Party Partido de Internet
- President: Jose Eiras Vila
- Secretary-General: Naiara Izcue Chourrat
- Founder: Hector Perez Arenas
- Founded: 2009
- Headquarters: Avenida de Francia nº 1, T3-14D, Valencia
- Ideology: Electronic direct democracy

Website
- www.partidodeinternet.es

The Internet Party (Partido de Internet in Spanish) is a political party founded on November 22, 2009 in Spain that tries to develop a liquid democracy system within the current legal system. The Internet Party has no ideology. They support an open list system where the elected members act representing the decisions taken by citizens in the Internet platform.

During the Spanish general election 2011, the Internet Party presented eight candidates in the electoral district of Cádiz and received 603 votes (0.09%).

== See also ==
- List of direct democracy parties
- Direct democracy
- E-democracy
- Demoex
