= Lena Adelsohn Liljeroth =

Swedish politician (born 1955)

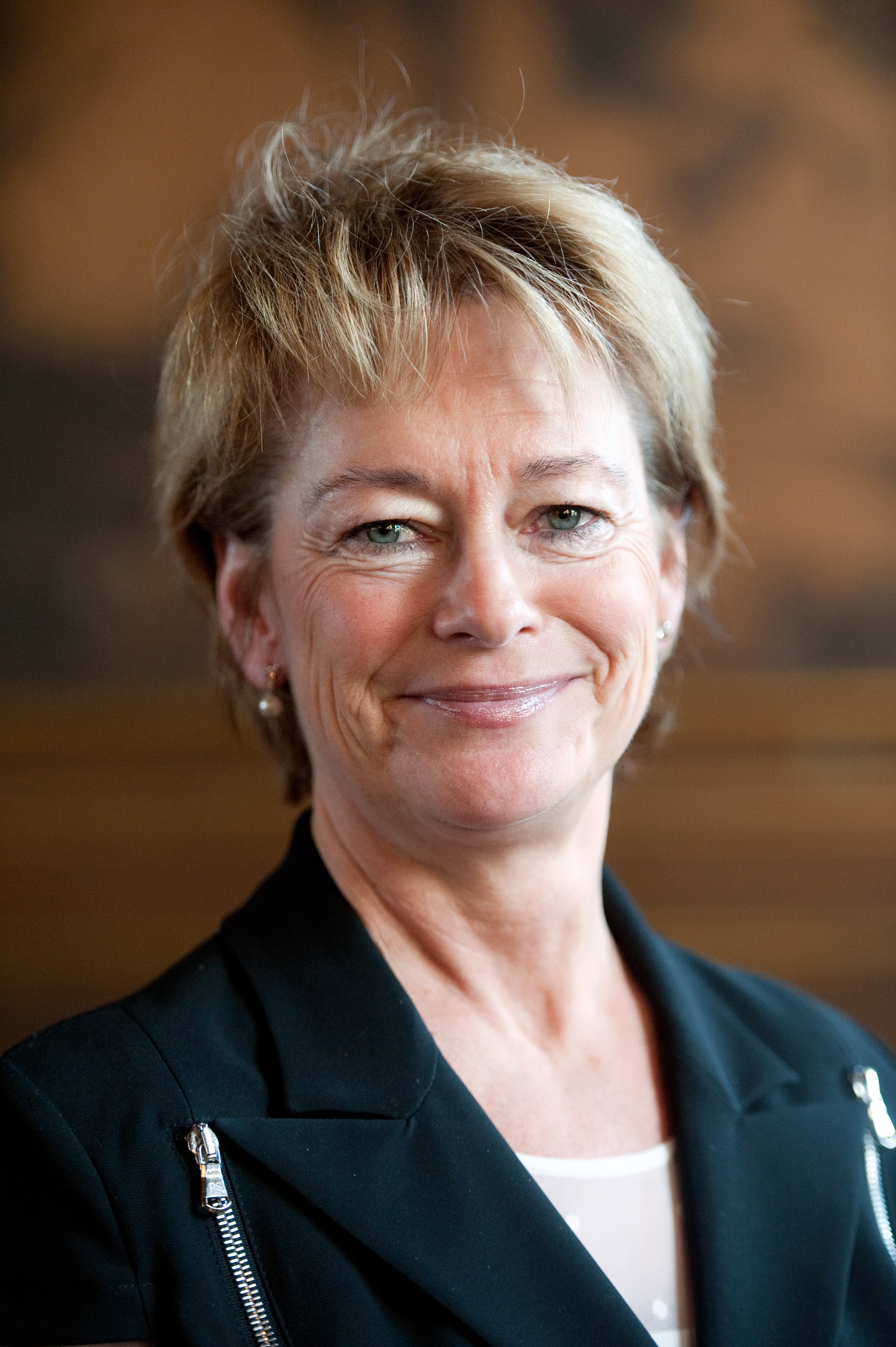
- Lena Adelsohn Liljeroth in October 2010

Minister for Culture and Sports
- In office 24 October 2006 – 3 October 2014
- Prime Minister: Fredrik Reinfeldt
- Preceded by: Cecilia Stegö Chilò
- Succeeded by: Alice Bah Kuhnke

Member of the Swedish Riksdag for Stockholm Municipality
- In office 30 September 2002 – 29 September 2014

Personal details
- Born: 24 November 1955 (age 70) Stockholm, Sweden
- Party: Moderate Party
- Spouse: Ulf Adelsohn

Lena Elisabeth Adelsohn Liljeroth (born 24 November 1955) is a Swedish politician who served as Minister for Culture and Sports from 2006 to 2014. A member of the Moderate Party, she was an MP of the Swedish Riksdag from 2002 to 2014.

== Personal life ==
Liljeroth was born in Spånga. She is married to former Moderate Party leader Ulf Adelsohn. They have 2 kids. She is partially deaf since birth.

=== Charity work ===
She appeared as Miss July in a 2005 calendar raising money for gender studies.

== Political life ==
Adelsohn Liljeroth is an ardent opponent of graffiti vandalism and advocates zero tolerance on the matter.

=== Cutting a cake at Moderna Museet ===
At a party for 2012 World Art Day, Adelsohn Liljeroth was photographed cutting a cake in the likeness of a stereotypical naked African tribal woman in the nude and with a creamy blood-red sponge filling. The cake, part of the project Afromantics started in 2004 by performance artist Makode Linde, was made to bring attention to racism and female genital mutilation.

The photographs were posted on Facebook and raised criticism and outrage, in Sweden and abroad. Dan Jonsson, a critic with Swedish daily Dagens Nyheter, suggested Adelsohn Liljeroth had been trapped in a situation that whatever she had chosen to do, it would have been wrong. Despite this support, others urged her to resign.

Government offices
Preceded by Cecilia Stegö Chilò	Minister for Culture and Sports; 2006–2014	Succeeded by Alice Bah Kuhnke (as Minister for Culture); Gabriel Wikström (as Minister for Sports)
