= Demoex =

Swedish political party and experiment with direct democracy

Demoex, an appellation short for democracy experiment, is a local Swedish political party and an experiment with direct democracy in Vallentuna, a suburb of Stockholm, Sweden. It uses the Internet to make it possible for any member to participate in the local government. Demoex has a representative in the municipal council, who votes in the council according to a poll that is held beforehand on the website of the party. This is unlike traditional representatives, who vote according to their own views or their party's views. Every Vallentuna resident older than 16 years can register on the website to vote; anyone in the world can take part in the debates, if they can write in Swedish. Voters do not have to vote on all issues; the fewer votes on an issue, the more weight each vote carries. To boost participation, the party allows users to choose someone to advise them on a particular topic.

Demoex was founded on March 6, 2002, and won a local election in the municipality Vallentuna that year. 2002-2010 the Demoex representative was 19-year-old student Parisa Molagholi, elected on 4 November 2002 with 1.7% of the votes. She began serving as representative in 2003, and was re-elected in 2006 with 2.9% of the votes. Her success has astonished traditional politicians. The party's representative, Per Norbäck, was elected in 2010 with 1.76% of the vote. Demoex intends to become a national party and eventually an international party on the same principles.

The Demoex system is a political hybrid which uses e-democracy to inject direct democracy into a system of representative democracy. This creates a semi-representative democracy, similar to one that has been used in Switzerland since the late 19th century. In pure direct democracy, there are no representatives, or there are only proxy representatives with limited power. By contrast, in a representative democracy, the elected representatives have all the power to make political decisions. The Swiss Landsgemeinde is one of the oldest and purest forms of direct democracy. It was originally introduced in the Swiss Canton of Uri in 1231, and was structured as an open-air gathering, usually in springtime, where votes were expressed by a show of raised hands. This system is still used in the Canton of Glarus and Appenzell Innerrhoden.

== Ideology ==
Although Demoex does not stand for any defined policy, it has a clear ideology: To extend the degree of democracy in society. They claim that technological solutions have surpassed the political. With the help of information technology Demoex wants to create liquid democracy.

=== Open society ===
The ideology is based on the thoughts from Karl Popper and Henri Bergson about open society; the vision of a society built on the principle of public access to official records. Demoex strives for increased access and partaking in the politics.

=== Statistical distribution ===
Demoex uses statistical distribution. It means that the purpose of Demoex representatives is to reflect the members' opinions as the online statistics indicate. If Demoex had 5 mandates and 60% of the users' votes for a proposal, then three of the representatives would vote "yes" to that proposal. The rounding follows according to mathematical principles. If it becomes impossible to reflect the members' opinions appropriately in one question, then one representative would give a blank vote. Statistical distribution is used because it gains democracy. In every question, there ought to be only one democratic election. Many sub-elections on the same issue can easily put the majority principle aside.

== History ==
=== Grass-roots initiative ===
The idea for Demoex began at Vallentuna upper secondary school, on 3 October 2000. The municipality organized a theme day on "IT and democracy," and the question emerged why so few young people are politically active. Some students answered that they did not approve of choosing between ideologies. They expressed that their points of view were impossible to place on a political right-left scale. Other students were pessimistic about the aspects of political influence. They argued that "decisions are made from above". Others answered they had no time to be involved in politics. Others again thought of politics as boring, tiring, and insignificant.

After an internet debate, an oral discussion with local politicians followed. The evaluation showed that students appreciated the speed and the structure offered by the electronic debate system but they felt run over by the traditional oral debate.

From this experience, a handful of students discussed with their philosophy teacher Per Norbäck the possibility of developing an e-democracy. They decided to register a party and candidate for the local government in September 2002 with only one promise: to inject direct democracy in the representative system.

In January 2002, they started to work on the project. Soon after, they contacted Mikael Nordfors, a pioneer within e-democracy in Sweden. In the early 1990s, Mikael had founded a party with a similar ideology. Mikael offered Demoex to use the software he had implemented through his company.

They made an Internet site, and started to sketch the work flow. Demoex tried to find a way to adopt direct democracy into the existing representative system. The Demoex model became a three-step process:

1. Thinning out
2. Debate
3. Cast ballot

Thinning out consists of removing any irrelevant questions. In the thinning out process, all the public affairs that the local parliament is dealing with are presented. The voters report (on a scale of 1-5) what affairs they want to discuss and vote for. If an affair gets higher average report than 3.00, there will be a debate and a vote.

In the debates, people argue for or against different political proposals. The debates are the base for the democratic votes. The debate is necessary in order to compare the pros and cons of the proposals. Any participant can contribute arguments to try to convince the other members of the "right" opinion.

The deadline for casting ballots is one day before the meeting of the local parliament. The results of the ballots are transformed into mandates according to statistical distribution. To fulfill the process, a Demoex representative needs to sign a contract with the promise to represent this distribution in the local parliament.

=== Rules and advertising ===
The founding activists of Demoex also made rules for all participants to follow. They believed that the rules were necessary to avoid chaos. After they had set the rules and found an accurate work flow, they had to advertise the concept. They distributed leaflets in the local postboxes, made Demoex T-shirts, and borrowed a house van as base for the electoral campaign. A certain interest from the media gave Demoex some attention. Though the advertising campaign was small and cheap, it was enough to win the first mandate of a direct democracy party in Europe.

== Similar initiatives ==
The Five Star Movement is the second biggest party in Italy and use an ideology similar to Demoex, using their own software Rousseau to decide its policies.

Lista Partecipata is an Italian initiative using a similar concept as Demoex. Their slogan is "The control of government in the hands of the citizens (and not only at election time)".

Senator On-Line is an Australian political party which proposes to have no platform but rather to act based on online polls.

Net Party in Argentina uses the software DemocracyOS for an online form of direct democracy, and its current goal is to get elected a congressperson who will vote according to what the citizenry decides online.

Other similar initiatives:

- Internet Party in Spain.
- Sanjska služba in Slovenia.

Since 2011, similar initiatives are working together as E2D.

== See also ==
- Collaborative governance
- Direct democracy
- Delegated voting

== Bibliography ==
- Barber, Benjamin R., 1984, Strong democracy: Participatory Politics for a New Age, University of California Press, Berkeley, CA.
- Dahl, Robert A., 1985, A preface to Economic Democracy, Polity Press, Oxford.
- Grönlund, Åke, 2001, IT, demokrati och medborgarnas deltagande, VINNOVA Rapport VR 2001:26 och TELDOK Rapport 142. TELDOK/VINNOVA, Stockholm.
- Habermas, Jürgen, 1996, Between Facts and Norms, Polity Press, Cambridge.
- Ilshammar, Lars, 2002, Offentlighetens nya rum – Teknik och politik i Sverige 1969–1999, Universitetsbiblioteket, Örebro
- Kvale, Steinar, 1997, Den kvalitativa forskningsintervjun, Studentlitteratur, Lund.
- Torpe, Lars, 2002, Demokrati på nettet - status og perspektiver for digitalkommunikation i kommunerna, paper till den XIII Nordiske Statskunskabskongres, Aalborg Universitet, 15-16 Augusti 2002. Besökt 2003-03-15
- Verhulst Jos and Nijeboer Arjen - Direct Democracy - facts, arguments and experiences on the introduction of initiative and referendum - download for free in 8 languages - Democracy international -
- NORBACK, Per. Demoex - think global, act local. Vallentuna, Sweden: The Utopian World Championship 2004.
- Olsson, Anders R., 1999, Elektronisk demokrati, Demokratiutredningens skriftserie nr. 16, SOU 1999:12, Fakta info direkt, Stockholm.
- Olsson, Anders R., 2001, E-röstning: En lägesrapport, IT-kommissionen, Observatoriet för IT, demokrati och medborgarskap, Observatorierapport 35/2001, IT-kommissionen, Stockholm.
- Ottesen, Karin, 2003, IT-stöd för demokratiska processer – med inriktning på innehållen funktionalitet och faktisk användning, Institutionen för informationsteknologi och medier, Mitthögskolan, Sundsvall.
