= Vallentuna =

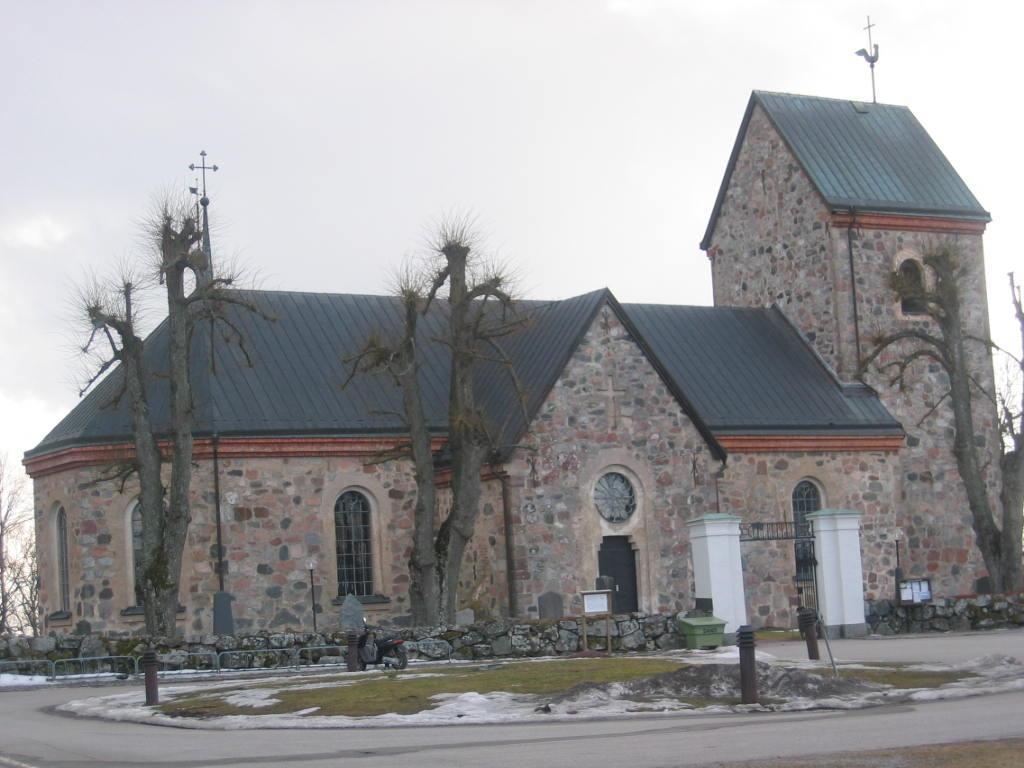
- Vallentuna Church

- Location within Stockholm Location within Sweden Location within European Union
- Coordinates: 59°32′N 18°05′E
- Country: Sweden
- Province: Uppland
- County: Stockholm County
- Municipality: Vallentuna Municipality and Täby Municipality

Area
  - Total: 15.96 km^{2} (6.16 sq mi)

Population (31 December 2020)
  - Total: 33,336
  - Density: 2,089/km^{2} (5,410/sq mi)
- Time zone: UTC+1 (CET)
  - Summer (DST): UTC+2 (CEST)

Vallentuna is the seat of Vallentuna Municipality in Stockholm County, Sweden, with 33,219 inhabitants in 2018. Vallentuna's cultural landscape is well preserved, and human habitation in the area has been traced back as far as the Stone Age. Archeological excavations in southern Vallentuna, near Lilla Gävsjö, uncovered remains of a Stone Age settlement.

During the Bronze Age, population settlements increased in Vallentuna and the surrounding Roslagen area, when the landmass gradually rose as a result of the retreating ice glaciers.

== See also ==
- Greater Stockholm
- Demoex
