= Urga (band) =

Swedish band

Urga are a Swedish music group that have released several albums under the Swedish record label Silence Records. A notable aspect of the band's music is the use of an invented language called 'Urganska'. They have also performed in Cirkus Cirkörs one of Scandinavia's leading performing circus companies.

== Discography ==
=== Albums ===
- Ur Kaos Föds Allting (1997)
- Etanol (1998)
- Urgasm (2000)

=== Singles ===
- Loco
