= Green Party (Sweden) =

Swedish political party

Green Party Miljöpartiet de gröna
- Abbreviation: MP
- Spokespersons: Daniel Helldén; Amanda Lind
- Founded: 20 September 1981; 45 years ago
- Headquarters: Pustegränd 1-3, Stockholm
- Youth wing: Young Greens
- Membership (2023): ▼12,877
- Ideology: Green politics
- Political position: Centre-left
- European affiliation: European Green Party
- European Parliament group: Greens–European Free Alliance
- International affiliation: Global Greens
- Nordic affiliation: Centre Group
- Colours: Green
- Riksdag: 22 / 349
- European Parliament: 3 / 21
- County councils: 48 / 1,696
- Municipal councils: 395 / 12,700

Website
- mp.se

The Green Party (Swedish: Miljöpartiet de gröna, lit. 'the Environmental Party, the Greens', MP), commonly referred to as Miljöpartiet in Swedish, is a political party in Sweden based on green politics. The party is represented nationally by two spokespeople, always one man and one woman. These roles are currently held by Amanda Lind and Daniel Helldén.

Sparked by the anti-nuclear power movement following the 1980 nuclear power referendum, the party was founded in 1981 out of a discontent with the existing parties' environmental policies. In the 1988 general election, they won seats in the Swedish Riksdag for the first time, capturing 5.5 percent of the vote, and becoming the first new party to enter parliament in seventy years. Three years later, they dropped back below the 4 percent threshold. In 1994, they returned to parliament and have since retained representation there.

Between 3 October 2014 and 30 November 2021, the Green Party was a part of the Social Democratic-led Löfven I, II, and III cabinets. This was the first time the Greens entered government in their history. The Greens left the government after the right-wing opposition parties' budget for 2022 was passed in the Riksdag, and the government's own budget failed to pass.

== Ideology ==
=== Fundamental principles ===
In their party platform, the Greens describe their ideology as being based on "a solidarity that can be expressed in three ways: solidarity with animals, nature, and the ecological system", "solidarity with coming generations", and "solidarity with all of the world's people". A Green analysis of society is based on a holistic view – everything is connected and interdependent.

The platform then describes these solidarities being expressed in "several fundamental ideas", these being participatory democracy, ecological wisdom, social justice, children's rights, circular economy, global justice, nonviolence, equality and feminism, animal rights, self-reliance and self-administration, freedom, and long-sightedness. The Swedish Green Party has its roots in the environmental, solidarity, women's rights and peace movements.

=== Climate change and the environment ===
The Green Party was the first political party in Sweden to raise the issue of climate change. Fighting climate change is a major policy issue for the party. For example, the party's main criticism of The Alliance's 2010 election manifesto was the "entirely astonishing" lack of effort in fighting climate change, and in 2013, the party announced a budget proposal that was dominated by a SEK 49 billion "climate package". The party supports a general shift in taxation policy, towards high taxes on environmentally unfriendly or unsustainable products and activities, hoping to thus influence people's behavior towards the more sustainable choices.

=== Nuclear power ===
The anti-nuclear movement was a major factor in the party's creation. The party's platform reads that "we oppose the construction of new reactors in Sweden, or an increase in the output of existing reactors, and instead want to begin immediately phasing out nuclear power." MP Per Bolund clarified in 2010 that the party "does not propose shutting down nuclear power reactors today, but rather phasing them out as new and renewable electricity is phased in."

=== European integration ===
The party was initially opposed to membership in the European Union, and sought a new referendum on the issue. The party's EU opposition captured them 17 percent of the votes in the 1995 European Parliament election, the first following Sweden’s EU accession. The Greens included withdrawal from the EU in their party platform as recently as 2006.

This policy was abolished in a September 2008 internal party referendum. However, the party remains soft Eurosceptic. The section of the party platform on the subject opens by citing how decentralization and making decisions locally, as reasonably possible, is a central part of green politics. It continues to state that the Greens "are warm adherents to international cooperation. We want to see Europe as a part of a world of democracies, where people move freely over borders, and where people and countries trade and cooperate with each other."

=== Symbol ===
The Green Party's party symbol is the dandelion.

== Leadership and organisation ==
The Greens, like many other green parties around the world, do not have a party leader in the traditional sense. The party is represented by two spokespeople, always one male and one female. The current spokespersons are Amanda Lind and Daniel Helldén. The spokespeople are elected annually by the party congress, up to a maximum of nine consecutive one-year terms.

The party congress, consisting of elected representatives of all of the party's local groups, is the highest decision-making organ in the Green Party. The congress, in addition to the two spokespeople, also fills many other important posts in the party, including a party board (Swedish: partistyrelse), which is the party's highest decision-making authority between party congresses, and the day-to-day operation of the party's national organisation. The congress also elects a party secretary (Swedish: partisekreterare), who is an internal, organisational leader for the party. The current party secretary, initially elected by the 2021 party congress, is Katrin Wissing.

=== Spokespersons of the Green Party (1984–present) ===
Spokespersons		Year
Ragnhild Pohanka	Per Gahrton	1984–1985
Ragnhild Pohanka	Birger Schlaug	1985–1986
Eva Goës	Birger Schlaug	1986–1986
Fiona Björling	Anders Nordin	1988–1990
Margareta Gisselberg	Jan Axelsson	1990–1991
Vacant	Jan Axelsson	1991–1992
Marianne Samuelsson	Birger Schlaug	1992–1999
Lotta Nilsson Hedström	Birger Schlaug	1999–2000
Lotta Nilsson Hedström	Matz Hammarström	2000–2002
Maria Wetterstrand	Peter Eriksson	2002–2011
Åsa Romson	Gustav Fridolin	2011–2016
Isabella Lövin	Gustav Fridolin	2016–2019
Isabella Lövin	Per Bolund	2019–2021
Märta Stenevi	Per Bolund	2021–2023
Märta Stenevi	Daniel Hellden	2023–2024
Amanda Lind	Daniel Hellden	2024–present

=== Secretaries-general (1985–present) ===
Secretaries-General	Year
Kjell Dahlström	1985–1999
Håkan Wåhlstedt	1999–2007
Agneta Börjesson	2007–2011
Anders Wallner	2011–2016
Amanda Lind	2016–2019
Marléne Tamlin (acting)	2019
Märta Stenevi	2019–2021
Linus Lakso (acting)	2021
Katrin Wissing	2021–present

== Current status ==
Currently, the Swedish Green Party has about 10 000 members, and its base is made up of younger people and women.

Organisations connected to the Swedish Green Party:

- The Young Greens of Sweden (Grön ungdom)
- The Green Students of Sweden (Gröna studenter)
- The Green seniors of Sweden (Gröna seniorer)

The Swedish Green Party is part of the European Greens.

== Criticism ==
=== Scandal involving Islamic extremism ===
The Green Party was hit by a political scandal in April 2016, as images emerged of Green Party housing minister Mehmet Kaplan attending a dinner party alongside leading members of the Turkish far-right extremist group Grey Wolves. Following attention to comments made by Kaplan in 2009 comparing Israel to Nazi Germany, Kaplan resigned as minister, while still defended by the party leadership. During a seminar in 2014, Kaplan equalized jihadists who travel to Syria with Swedish volunteers who fought on the Finnish side against the Soviet Union during the Winter War 1939-1940. Kaplan later defended himself as being misunderstood and said he is against "young Swedes traveling to the war in Syria". After his resignation, images emerged of Kaplan and other members of the Green Party displaying hand gestures associated with the Muslim Brotherhood.

Another controversy ensued as a rising Green-Party star, Yasri Khan, refused to shake hands with a female TV reporter. Lars Nicander, director of the Centre for Asymmetric Threat Studies at the Swedish Defence University, compared the revelations with how the Soviet Union sought to infiltrate democratic Western parties during the Cold War, alleging that the Green Party similarly may have been "infiltrated by Islamists". Yasri Khan was criticised by members within the party. He withdrew his candidacy for the Green Party executive board and also quit his seats on a regional board and city council. Spokesperson Fridolin said: men, especially those wanting to be in Swedish politics, should have no problems shaking a woman's hand. The Green Party's spokespersons also commented on the debate saying there's no evidence of Islamists influencing party policies, but underlined the party needs a "reset" with greater focus on environmental issues.

In April 2016, Kamal al Raffi, a Green Party politician from the council of Burlöv Municipality as well as the chairman of the local Syrian community group invited Osama bin Laden's former advisor Salman al-Ouda to hold a lecture to be attended by his and two other community groups. This invitation was controversial in Sweden as Al-Ouda, a Muslim Salafist, is known for openly antisemitic views and denying the Holocaust. The Green Party politician was suspended for a time by the party leadership. During the scandal, the party secretary promised the party will better handle crises in the future.

In May 2016, Green Party co-spokesperson and Environmental Minister Åsa Romson confirmed she would resign from both positions as a result of her leadership during the party crisis, along with controversies of her own, such as referring to the September 11 attacks as the 11 September "olycka" ('accident' or 'misfortune', Romson later claimed she had meant the latter) in a television interview.

Romson later explained her comment, and said: "Of course, the attack on New York on 11 September 2001 is one of the biggest attacks, terror-actions and assaults on the peaceful and democratic world we have seen in modern times. I have no other opinion on this matter."

=== Campaign on higher prices ===
The Green Party was rated in 2022 as Sweden's most disliked party by voters. Campaigning and election promises of making prices higher regarding gasoline was heavily criticized.

== Electoral politics ==
Green Party results by group, VALU 2010
Group	Votes (%)	Avg. result +/− (pp)
Students	19	+9
Members of SACO	16	+6
Aged 18–21	16	+6
Aged 22–30	16	+6
First-time voters	16	+6
Government employees	12	+2
Public sector employees	12	+2
Local government employees	12	+2
White-collar workers	11	+1
Employed persons	11	+1
Members of TCO	11	+1
Females	11	+1
Unemployed	10	0
Private sector employees	9	-1
Males	9	-1
Aged 31–64	9	-1
Blue-collar workers	9	-1
Business owners	8	-2
Raised outside Sweden	7	-3
Members of LO	7	-3
On sick leave	7	-3
Aged 65+	4	-6
Farmers	4	-6
All groups (total)	10	0

It is often believed that the party is situated on the left on a left-right scale due to its co-operation with the Social Democratic Party. The party participated in a political and electoral coalition called the Red-Greens with the Social Democrats and Left Party from October 2008 until the 2010 general election in September 2010, and has vowed to co-operate with the Social Democrats until 2020. In several municipalities, however, the Greens cooperate with liberal and conservative parties, and the party does not define itself as left, nor right. Rather, they place themselves on one end of a scale between sustainability and growth. In an article published in 2009, Maria Wetterstrand, then party co-spokesperson, defined the party as a natural home also for green-minded social liberals and libertarian socialists, by referring to its liberal policy regarding immigration and its support of personal integrity, participation and entrepreneurship, among other issues.

=== Church politics ===
The party does not directly participate in elections to the Church of Sweden. However, Greens in the Church of Sweden, an independent nominating group, participates in church elections at all levels.

=== Relationship with other parties ===
The Green Party has a good relationship with the Social Democrats, and to a lesser extent, with the Left Party. The party does not rule out participation in a government with the minor liberal and centre-right parties in Sweden. The Green Party on first entering the Riksdag, allied with the Conservative Bloc in opposition to the Social Democrats. The Green Party has made clear that its preference among cooperative arrangements with the Conservative Bloc does not include support of a government led by the liberal-conservative Moderate Party. However, historically there have been political deals concluded with the parties forming the centre-right Alliance as an example concerning education. Co-operation with the Moderate Party on the municipal level are relatively frequent.

== Membership ==
Historical membership

Year	Members	±%
1987	5,500	—
1988	8,500	+54.5%
1989	8,000	−5.9%
1990	7,600	−5.0%
1991	6,900	−9.2%
1992	6,400	−7.2%
1993	5,300	−17.2%
1994	6,500	+22.6%
1995	5,600	−13.8%
1996	6,950	+24.1%
1997	7,500	+7.9%
1998	7,900	+5.3%
1999	7,285	−7.8%
2000	6,918	−5.0%
2001	6,701	−3.1%
2002	8,011	+19.5%
2003	7,483	−6.6%

Year	Members	±%
2004	7,178	−4.1%
2005	7,249	+1.0%
2006	9,543	+31.6%
2007	9,045	−5.2%
2008	9,111	+0.7%
2009	10,635	+16.7%
2010	15,544	+46.2%
2011	14,648	−5.8%
2012	13,354	−8.8%
2013	13,760	+3.0%
2014	20,214	+46.9%
2015	16,735	−17.2%
2016	13,689	−18.2%
2017	10,719	−21.7%
2018	12,418	+15.9%
2019	10,588	−14.7%
2020	9,530	−10.0%

Source: Green Party

== Election results ==
=== Parliament (Riksdag) ===
Election	Votes	%	Seats	+/–	Status
1982	91,787	1.7 (#7)	0 / 349		Extra-parliamentary
1985	83,645	1.5 (#7)	0 / 349		Extra-parliamentary
1988	296,935	5.5 (#6)	20 / 349	▲20	Opposition
1991	185,051	3.4 (#8)	0 / 349	▼20	Extra-parliamentary
1994	279,042	5.0 (#6)	18 / 349	▲18	Opposition
1998	236,699	4.5 (#7)	16 / 349	▼2	External support
2002	246,392	4.7 (#7)	17 / 349	▲1	External support
2006	291,121	5.2 (#7)	19 / 349	▲2	Opposition
2010	437,435	7.3 (#3)	25 / 349	▲6	Opposition
2014	408,365	6.8 (#4)	25 / 349	0	Coalition
2018	285,899	4.4 (#8)	16 / 349	▼9	Coalition (2018-2021)
2018	285,899	4.4 (#8)	16 / 349	▼9	External support (2021-2022)
2022	329,242	5.1 (#7)	18 / 349	▲2	Opposition
2026	414,307	6.12 (#7)	22 / 349	▲4	

=== Regional councils ===
Election	Votes	%	Seats	+/–
1982	98,042	1.9	0 / 1,717	
1985	104,166	2.0	0 / 1,733	
1988	237,556	4.8	73 / 1,743	▲73
1991	156,594	3.1	34 / 1,763	▼39
1994	236,666	4.6	78 / 1,777	▲44
1998	226,398	4.4	70 / 1,646	▼8
2002	204,169	3.9	55 / 1,656	▼15
2006	256,547	4.74	68 / 1,656	▲13
2010	398,782	6.9	104 / 1,662	▲36
2014	442,760	7.2	106 / 1,678	▲2
2018	265,522	4.1	48 / 1,696	▼58
2022			31 / 1,696	▼17

=== Municipal councils ===
Election	Votes	%	Seats	+/–
1982	91,842	1.6	129 / 13,500	▲129
1985	142,498	2.5	237 / 13,520	▲108
1988	302,797	5.6	693 / 13,564	▲456
1991	199,207	3.6	389 / 13,526	▼304
1994	298,044	5.3	616 / 13,550	▲230
1998	252,675	4.8	559 / 13,388	▼8
2002	227,189	4.2	443 / 13,274	▼116
2006	269,560	4.8	436 / 13,092	▼7
2010	418,362	7.1	686 / 12,978	▲250
2014	483,529	7.7	732 / 12,780	▲46
2018	301,825	4.6	395 / 12,700	▼337

=== European Parliament ===
Year	List leader	Votes	%	Seats	+/–	EP Group
1995	Per Gahrton	462,092	17.22 (#3)	4 / 22	New	G
1999	Per Gahrton	239,946	9.49 (#5)	2 / 22	▼2	Greens/EFA
2004	Carl Schlyter	149,603	5.96 (#7)	1 / 19	▼1	Greens/EFA
2009	Carl Schlyter	349,114	11.02 (#4)	2 / 18	▲1	Greens/EFA
2011	Carl Schlyter	349,114	11.02 (#4)	2 / 20	0	Greens/EFA
2014	Isabella Lövin	572,591	15.41 (#2)	4 / 20	▲2	Greens/EFA
2019	Alice Bah Kuhnke	478,258	11.52 (#4)	2 / 20	▼2	Greens/EFA
2020	Alice Bah Kuhnke	478,258	11.52 (#4)	3 / 21	▲1	Greens/EFA
2024	Alice Bah Kuhnke	581,322	13.85 (#3)	3 / 21	0	Greens/EFA

== See also ==
- Elections in Sweden
- Green politics
- List of environmental organizations
- Referendums in Sweden
- Worldwide green parties
