= Ministry of Culture (Sweden) =

Government ministry of Sweden

Coordinates: 59°19′47.89″N 18°03′55.49″E

- Kulturdepartementet

Agency overview
- Formed: 1 December 1991
- Headquarters: Stockholm, Sweden
- Employees: 105 (2024)
- Annual budget: SEK 133 million (2025)
- Minister responsible: Parisa Liljestrand, Head of the Ministry Minister for Culture
- Parent agency: Government Offices
- Website: www.government.se/government-of-sweden/ministry-of-culture/

The Ministry of Culture (Swedish: Kulturdepartementet) is a ministry within the government of Sweden responsible for culture policy. The ministry is headed by the minister for culture, currently Parisa Liljestrand (m).

The Ministry of Culture is located at Drottninggatan 16 in central Stockholm.

== History ==
The ministry was created on 1 December 1991 by the Carl Bildt cabinet and took over cultural policy issues from the Ministry of Education. The Ministry of Culture was dissolved in 2004 by the Persson cabinet and became part of the Ministry of Education and Culture. After the Conservative Party's election victory in 2006, the Reinfeldt cabinet re-established the Ministry of Culture as a separate ministry on 1 January 2007.

== Government agencies ==
The Ministry of Culture holds ministerial responsibility for the following government agencies:

- Election Authority (Valmyndigheten)
- Sámi Parliament (Sametinget)
- Swedish Arts Council (Statens kulturråd)
- Swedish Media Council (Statens medieråd)
- Public Art Agency (Statens konstråd)
- National Archives (Riksarkivet)
- National Heritage Board (Riksantikvarieämbetet)
- Agency for Support to Faith Communities (Myndigheten för stöd till trossamfund)
- Agency for Youth and Civil Society (Myndigheten för ungdoms- och civilsamhällesfrågor)
- Press and Broadcasting Authority (Myndigheten för press, radio och tv)
- Agency for Accessible Media (Myndigheten för tillgängliga medier)
- Agency for Cultural Policy Analysis (Myndigheten för kulturanalys)
- Handicraft Council (Nämnden för hemslöjdsfrågor)
- Arts Grants Committee (Konstnärsnämnden)
- Forum for Living History (Forum för levande historia)

Academies and institutes

- Royal Academy (Kungliga Akademien för de fria konsterna)
- Royal Swedish Academy of Music (Kungliga Musikaliska Akademien)
- Royal Academy of Letters (Kungliga Vitterhets Historie och Antikvitets Akademien)
- Institute for Language and Folklore (Institutet för språk och folkminnen)
- Swedish Film Institute (Svenska filminstitutet)

Public museums

- National Historical Museums (Statens historiska museer)
- Swedish National Museum of Fine Arts (Nationalmuseum)
- Moderna Museet
- Swedish Museum of Natural History (Naturhistoriska riksmuseet)
- Nordic Museum (Nordiska museet)
- Skansen
- National Swedish Museums of Military History (Statens försvarshistoriska museer)
- Swedish Centre for Architecture and Design (Statens centrum för arkitektur och design)
- Museum of Science and Technology (Tekniska museet)
- Museum of Work (Arbetets museum).

Performing arts

- Royal Dramatic Theatre (Dramaten)
- Royal Swedish Opera (Kungliga Operan)
- National Swedish Touring Theatre
- Performing Arts Agency (Statens musikverk)

== Areas of responsibility ==
The Ministry of Culture is responsible for issues concerning culture, democracy, media, the national minorities, and the language and culture of the Sami people. The Ministry is also responsible for sport, youth policy and issues concerning civil society, faith communities, and burial and cremation services.
