= 2024 Swedish government reshuffle =

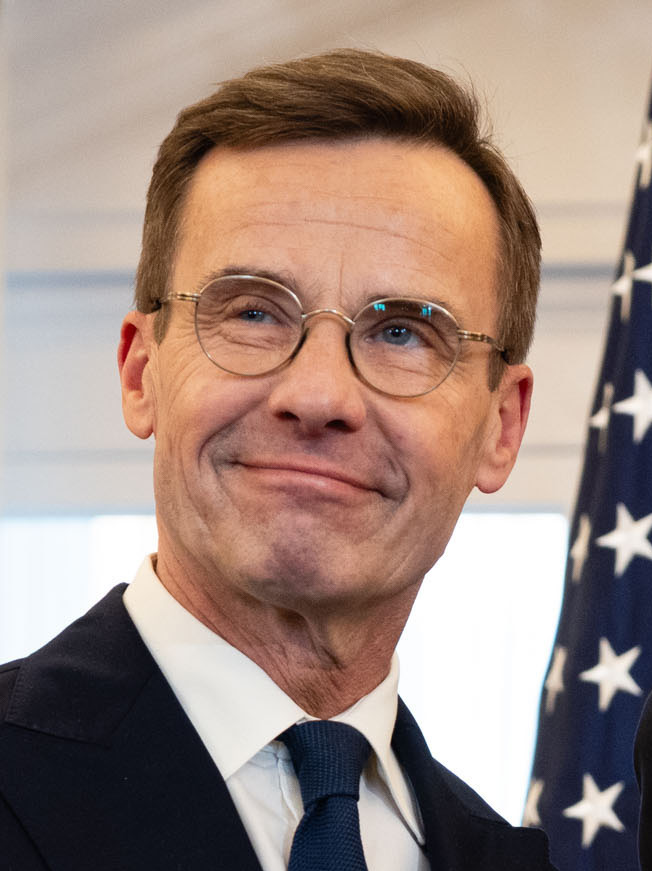
Kristersson in 2024

Swedish Prime Minister Ulf Kristersson carried out the first cabinet reshuffle of his premiership on 10 September 2024, announcing it during his Declaration of Government speech at the Opening of the Riksdag. The cause for the reshuffle was that Minister for European Union Affairs and Nordic Cooperation Jessika Roswall had earlier in the year, following the 2024 European Parliament election, been nominated by the government to become Sweden's European commissioner for the 2024–2029 term, forcing her to leave her ministerial role. Later, on 4 September, Foreign Minister Tobias Billström announced his surprise resignation, creating another hole to fill in Kristersson's cabinet.

== Changes ==
Moderate Party parliamentarian, Committee on European Union Affairs chairwoman and previous favorite for the position after the 2022 general election Jessica Rosencrantz was appointed to succeed Roswall as Minister for European Union Affairs and Nordic Cooperation, having previously been mentioned among the top contenders for the post.

On 4 September 2024, less than a week prior to the Opening of the Riksdag when prime minister Ulf Kristersson was set to report to the Riksdag which ministers would be part of his cabinet for the upcoming parliamentary year, Tobias Billström, Minister for Foreign Affairs, made a surprise announcement stating he would resign as Foreign Minister and Member of the Riksdag, intending to retire from politics altogether. Many saw this decision as strange, since Billström was a career politician at the height of his career. There have been many theories about his reason for resigning floated by the media, including a claimed conflict between him and Kristersson. Billström has maintained his reason for leaving politics is that he wanted a chance to start over.

To succeed Billström, many potential candidates were listed by the media, including former prime ministers Fredrik Reinfeldt and Carl Bildt. It was however former crown bailiff and Minister for Migration and Asylum Policy Maria Malmer Stenergard, often referred to as the "Crown Princess of the Moderate Party" and a potential successor to Kristersson, who was appointed as the new Minister for Foreign Affairs. As her position now became vacant, Foreign Trade and International Development Cooperation Minister Johan Forssell was made the new Migration Minister.

To replace Forssell former Moderate Youth League chairman and CEO of Företagarna, the Swedish Federation of Business Owners, Benjamin Dousa was selected.

Leader of the Liberals Johan Pehrson, who since 2022 had served as Minister for Employment and Integration, swapped role with fellow Liberal Minister Mats Persson, Minister for Education, during the reshuffle making him the new Minister for Education and Mats Persson the new Minister for Employment and Integration. The swap was seen as natural by many as many former leaders of the Liberals have served as Ministers for Education.

== Reactions ==
Teresa Carvalho, spokesperson of the Social Democrats on matters of employment, criticized Johan Pehrsons change of position on X stating she thinks the main reason for it was that Pehrson did not want to be associated with the record high unemployed rates seen during his time as Minister for Employment.
