= Committee on European Union Affairs =

Swedish parliamentary committee

The Committee on European Union Affairs (Swedish: nämnden för Europeiska unionen, also called EU-nämnden) is a governmental body in the Swedish Riksdag, where the Riksdag and the Swedish Government consult matters and issues about the European Union (EU). In the EU Committee, Sweden's negotiating position is determined prior to a meeting of the European Council or the Council of the European Union.

The Speaker of the committee is currently Erik Ottoson from the Moderate Party, along with vice-Speaker Matilda Ernkrans from the Social Democrats.

== History ==
In June 1994, a proposal was adopted in the Riksdag for forms of co-operation between the Riksdag and the Government on EU issues, among other things, a proposal for a principle was adopted on the establishment of the EU Committee. Later that year, the Riksdag's position with EU issues and the EU Committee's tasks was regulated by a Riksdag decision:

The Government shall inform the EU Committee of matters to be decided by the Council of the European Union. The Government shall also consult with the committee on how the negotiations in the Council shall be conducted prior to the decisions in the Council. The Government shall consult with the EU Board on other matters concerning the work in the European Union when the Board, for special reasons, calls for such a discussion. The Government shall consult with the Board prior to meetings of the European Council.

— Riksdagsordningen, Chapter 10, §10 (unofficial translation),

In addition to the established EU Committee, the Constitutional Inquiry, before the EU, discussed the possibility that the consultation would take place in the Foreign Affairs Committee or in other Riksdag committees. As the EU issues only apply in certain cases and have little to do with traditional foreign policy, the proposal was rejected by the Foreign Affairs Committee. If the consultation were to take place in the committees, there was a risk that the workload would be too great and that the Riksdag's overview of EU policy would suffer. The government would also find it difficult to have a large number of committees to consult with. The Constitutional Inquiry also stated that the overall influence would be greater if the Riksdag's consultations were coordinated through a spokesperson instead of through the respective committees. The EU Committee was set up with a clear role model in the Danish Folketinget's Marketing Committee (Markedsudvalget), a special committee for consideration and anchoring of EU related issues. The Marketing Committee has been considered to have a strong influence on the formulation of EU policy in Denmark.

== Chairs and deputy chairs of the committee ==
=== List of chairpersons for the committee ===
Name	Period	Political party
Berit Löfstedt	1995-1998	Social Democratic Party
Sören Lekberg	1998–2002	Social Democratic Party
Inger Segelström	2002–2004	Social Democratic Party
Tommy Waidelich	2004–2006	Social Democratic Party
Göran Lennmarker	2006–2006	Moderate Party
Björn Hamilton	2006–2007	Moderate Party
Anna Kinberg Batra	2007-2010	Moderate Party
Carl B. Hamilton	2010–2012	Liberal People's Party
Allan Widman	2012–2014	Liberal People's Party
Carl Schlyter	2014–2016	Green Party
Åsa Romson	2016–2017	Green Party
Jonas Eriksson	2017–2018	Green Party
Åsa Westlund	2018–2020	Social Democratic Party
Pyry Niemi	2020–2022	Social Democratic Party
Jessika Roswall	2022	Moderate Party
Hans Wallmark	2022–2024	Moderate Party
Jessica Rosencrantz	2024	Moderate Party
Erik Ottoson	2024–	Moderate Party

=== List of deputy chairpersons for the committee ===
Name	Period	Political party	Notes
Lars Tobisson	1995–2002	Moderate Party	
Göran Lennmarker	2002	Moderate Party	
Carl B. Hamilton	2002–2006	Liberal People's Party	
Susanne Eberstein	2006–2010	Social Democratic Party	
Marie Granlund	2010–2014	Social Democratic Party	
Eskil Erlandsson	2014–2019	Centre Party	
Annika Qarlsson	2019–2022	Centre Party	
Tomas Tobé	2019	Moderate Party	Second vice-Speaker
Pål Jonson	2019	Moderate Party	Second vice-Speaker
Jessika Roswall	2019–2022	Moderate Party	Second vice-Speaker
Björn Wiechel	2022	Social Democratic Party	
Matilda Ernkrans	2022–	Social Democratic Party	

== Working methods of the committee ==
The Committee on European Union Affairs currently has 17 members. In the current term (2018–2022), the Social Democrats have five members, the Moderates four, the Sweden Democrats three, and other parties such as the Green Party, the Center Party, the Left Party, the Liberals and the Christian Democrats all have one member each. The EU Committee has more alternates than in the “ordinary” professional committees (41 of them as of 7 September 2011). The parties try to cover the committees most affected by EU issues with the appointments of members and alternates.

The Committee usually meets with the government on Fridays based on the agenda items that come up at the Council of Ministers' meetings the following week. It is often difficult to know exactly which issues will be the subject of negotiations in the Council of Ministers, as the preparations in COREPER conclude shortly before the meeting and it is only then that points being raised at the Council of Ministers are made known. Normally, the responsible minister (or state secretary) reports back from the previous cabinet meeting and then goes through the agenda for next week's meeting. In the following, the members can then discuss with the government the Swedish position proposed by the government on the issue. The members or parties that do not share the government's view on the issue are expected to clarify this. According to practice, it is in the EU committee that Sweden's negotiating position is determined. The Speaker of the Committee concludes each consultation point by stating whether there is a majority for the government's position on the issue or not.

== The EU Committee's political mandate ==
The material for consultations mainly consists of annotated Prime Minister memoranda where prioritised agenda items are commented on. The material must contain, among other things, information about the meaning of the questions and how Swedish rules and statutes are affected, any amendments by the European Parliament and the commission's position on the issue, and the openly stated positions of Member States. The government's proposal for a Swedish negotiating position must also be clarified.

Prior to EC membership and even after one and a half years of Swedish membership, the Constitutional Committee expressed what can be described as an established practice, namely that:

It should be possible to assume that the government will not represent a position that is contrary to what the committee has given expressed in the consultation.

— Konstitutionsutskottet/Constitutional Committee (KU), (unofficial translation),

Praxis is further developed and due to the Riksdag Board's proposal "The Riksdag for the 2000s", the Constitutional Committee submitted a report in 2001 which affirms sharper writing of the Government's commitment to the EU Committee's views.

The Riksdag Board considers that the practice should continue, which means that it is not considered sufficient that the government does not do something that is in conflict with the EU Committee's views but instead acts in accordance with the committee's advice and positions.

— Constitutional Committee (KU), (unofficial translation),

The Constitutional Committee states in another report the same year that there must be very good reasons for the government not to represent the committee's position. The EU Committee's advice and views can thus be said to be politically, but not legally, binding.

== New system for dealing with EU issues in the Riksdag ==
In an SOU report from 2002, political scientists Shirin Ahlbäck Öberg and Ann-Cathrin Jungar believe that Finnish parliamentarians are more involved in EU issues and experience parliament's power as greater than Swedish parliamentarians do. The authors say that in general, the difference between the parliaments seems to be explained in different constitutional solutions.

In Finland, the committees have been much more active in EU issues and often submitted opinions to the Grand Committee, (the Finnish equivalent of the EU-Committee) the equivalent of the EU Committee.

There is a desire from the Riksdag and the EU Committee to enter the EU decision-making process earlier, as otherwise there may be a risk that the Riksdag's overall influence over EU policy will suffer. The same applies to the information prior to the meetings of the EU Board, which arrives late due to the work rhythm, and which was perceived by the members, not least in the Board's early years, as deficient. Furthermore, the members of the EU Committee must deal with issues from widely differing policy areas; even though the members are often experienced parliamentarians, the government usually has a head start in terms of expertise.

The Riksdag Committee has an ongoing task to evaluate the Riksdag's decision from 2001 on the Riksdag's handling of EU issues and to

unconditionally examine the forms of the Riksdag's work on EU issues and propose the organizational and constitutional changes the committee deems necessary. A starting point for the committee's work is that EU issues should be integrated as far as possible into the usual parliamentary work and that all members should have the opportunity to familiarize themselves with and follow EU issues. Another is to clarify the role of the Riksdag and strengthen the Riksdag's influence on EU issues. Finally, EU work in the Riksdag must be characterized by the openness with good opportunities for transparency for citizens.

— Constitutional Committee (KU), (unofficial translation),

== See also ==
- Conference of Parliamentary Committees for Union Affairs
