= Margot Wallström =

Swedish politician (born 1954)

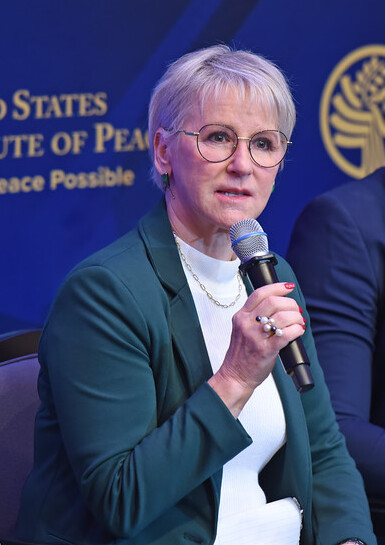
- Wallström in 2023

Deputy Prime Minister of Sweden
- In office 3 October 2014 – 10 September 2019
- Monarch: Carl XVI Gustaf
- Prime Minister: Stefan Löfven
- Preceded by: Jan Björklund
- Succeeded by: Morgan Johansson

Minister for Foreign Affairs
- In office 3 October 2014 – 10 September 2019
- Prime Minister: Stefan Löfven
- Preceded by: Carl Bildt
- Succeeded by: Ann Linde

Minister for Nordic Cooperation
- In office 25 May 2016 – 21 January 2019
- Prime Minister: Stefan Löfven
- Preceded by: Kristina Persson
- Succeeded by: Ann Linde

United Nations Special Representative on Sexual Violence in Conflict
- In office April 2010 – 22 June 2012
- Secretary General: Ban Ki-moon
- Preceded by: Office established
- Succeeded by: Zainab Bangura

First Vice-President of the European Commission
- In office 22 November 2004 – 9 February 2010
- President: José Manuel Barroso
- Preceded by: Position established
- Succeeded by: Catherine Ashton

European Commissioner for Institutional Relations and Communication Strategy
- In office 22 November 2004 – 9 February 2010
- President: José Manuel Barroso
- Preceded by: Position established
- Succeeded by: Maroš Šefčovič (Inter-Institutional Relations and Administration)

European Commissioner for the Environment
- In office 13 September 1999 – 11 November 2004
- President: Romano Prodi
- Preceded by: Ritt Bjerregaard
- Succeeded by: Stavros Dimas

Minister for Consumer Affairs
- In office 4 October 1988 – 4 October 1991
- Prime Minister: Ingvar Carlsson
- Preceded by: Bengt K. Å. Johansson
- Succeeded by: Inger Davidson

Member of the Riksdag
- In office 19 September 1982 – 11 September 1999
- Constituency: Värmland

Personal details
- Born: Margot Elisabeth Wallström; 28 September 1954 (age 72) Skellefteå, Sweden
- Party: Social Democratic
- Spouse: Håkan Olsson (m. 1984)
- Children: 2

Margot Elisabeth Wallström (Swedish pronunciation: [ˈmǎrːɡɔt ˈvâlːstrœm]; born 28 September 1954) is a Swedish politician of the Swedish Social Democratic Party who served as Deputy Prime Minister of Sweden and Minister for Foreign Affairs from 2014 to 2019 and Minister for Nordic Cooperation from 2016 to 2019.

Wallström previously served as the first United Nations Special Representative on Sexual Violence in Conflict from 2010 to 2012, as Vice-President of the European Commission and European Commissioner for Institutional Relations and Communication Strategy from 2004 to 2010, European Commissioner for the Environment from 1999 to 2004, Minister for Consumer Affairs from 1988 to 1991 and Member of the Riksdag (MP) for Värmland from 1982 to 1999.

== Early life and career ==
Born in Skellefteå, Wallström is a high school graduate without academic degrees. In 1973, she started her career as a banking clerk at the Alfa Savings bank in Karlstad. She worked there from 1977 to 1979, and briefly as an accountant from 1986 to 1987. Wallström was the CEO of a regional TV network in Värmland, Sweden from 1993 to 1994. Before taking up her appointment as EU Commissioner she was executive vice-president of Worldview Global Media in Colombo, Sri Lanka.

== Political career ==
Wallström has had a long career in politics in the Swedish parliament, the Swedish government, and the European Commission. At 25, she was elected to parliament. She was Environment Commissioner from 1999 to 2004, and in the Swedish government she was Minister for Consumer Affairs, Women and Youth from 1988 to 1991, Minister for Culture from 1994 to 1996, and Minister for Social Affairs from 1996 to 1998.

=== European Commissioner for the Environment, 1999–2004 ===
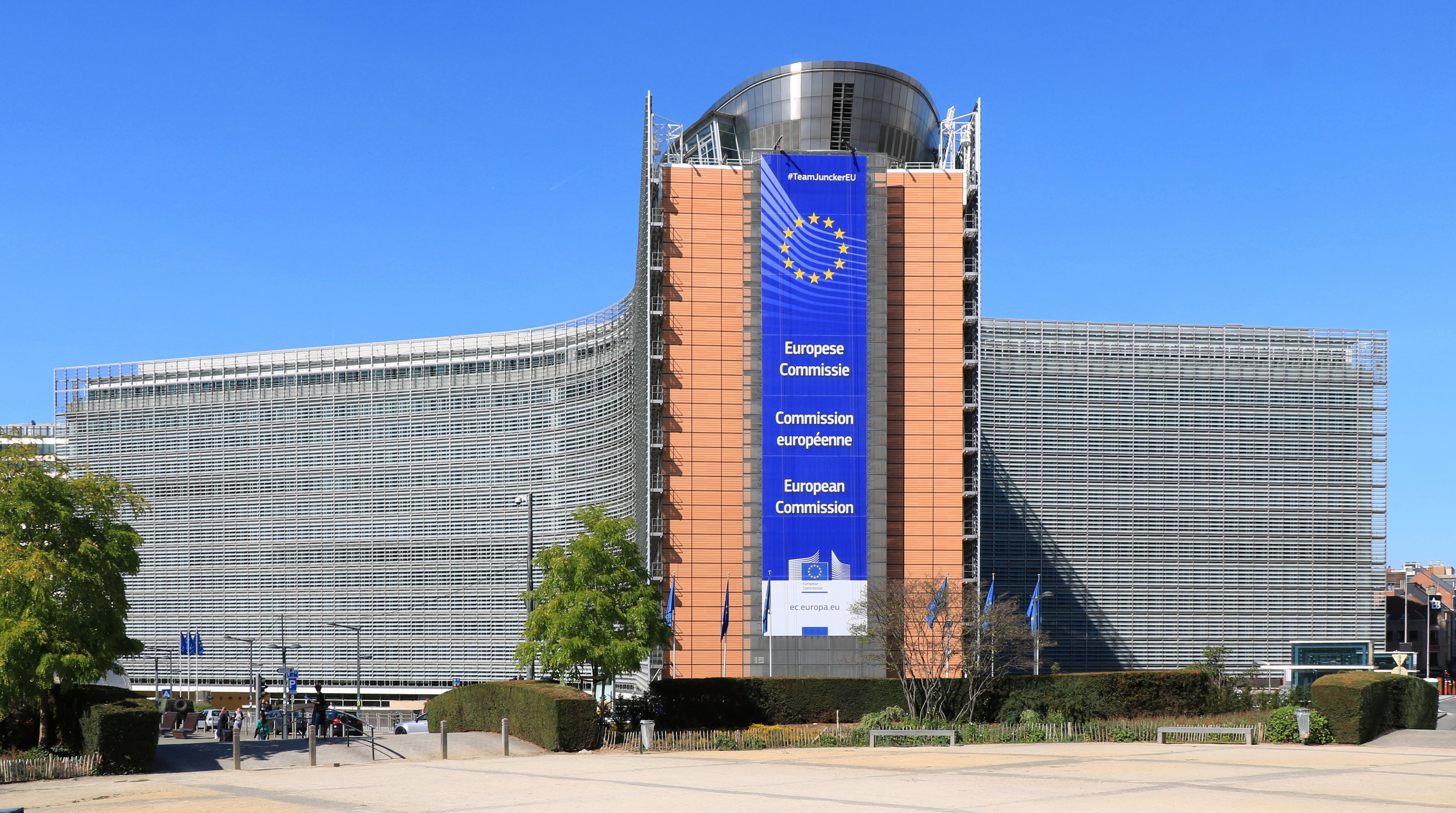
The European Commission, of which Margot Wallström was first Vice-President from 2004 to 2010

During her time in office, Wallström pushed the European Commission's initial proposal for REACH, a regulation requiring manufacturers of industrial chemicals to test and register their products with the European Chemicals Agency before they can be used. In 2004, she approved the importation of a genetically modified corn from the United States for animal feed after a six-year moratorium, arguing in a statement that the corn produced by biotechnology company Monsanto, known as NK603 maize, had been rigorously tested and was considered "as safe as any conventional maize".

=== First Vice-President of the European Commission, 2004–2010 ===
In 2004, Wallström became the first member of the European Commission to operate a blog. The comments section of her site quickly became a hotspot for arguments concerning the policies of the European Union. After the rejection of the Treaty establishing a Constitution for Europe by French and Dutch voters, Wallström pushed forward her "plan D" (for democracy, dialogue and debate) to reconnect Citizens with the Union. Her work on such platforms, including the backing of the oneseat.eu petition, has given her a good reputation in some quarters, even being dubbed "the Citizens Commissioner" – but has earned her names like "the Propaganda Commissioner" as well from political opponents. The Economist listed her among the least effective commissioners in 2009.

In 2006, Wallström presented her a plan to transform the EU's Europe by Satellite (EbS) video-broadcast service into an EU news agency; the plan was scrapped after press organizations complained that it would undermine the work of reporters covering the EU. Following Sweden's 2006 election, in which the Social Democratic Party lost power, former Prime Minister Göran Persson announced his withdrawal from politics in March 2007. Wallström was regarded as the favourite candidate to succeed Persson as Social Democratic party leader, but made clear that she did not wish to be considered for the position. The post instead went to Mona Sahlin.

Between 2006 and 2007, Wallström served as member of the Amato Group, a group of high-level European politicians unofficially working on rewriting the Treaty establishing a Constitution for Europe into what became known as the Treaty of Lisbon following its rejection by French and Dutch voters. Immediately after the election of Mona Sahlin as party leader, Wallström accepted a membership in a group working to develop political strategies for the upcoming election to the European Parliament in 2009. The membership in this group was considered by Swedish liberal Carl B Hamilton (and later also Fredrik Reinfeldt) to constitute a breach of the oath every member of the European Commission gives, which states that any member of the commission should work for the community's best interest with no influence from politicians. European Commission spokespeople Mikolaj Dowgielewicz and Pia Ahrenkilde-Hansen stated that her new assignment was not in conflict with her commissioner position.

In December 2006, Wallström was voted the most popular woman in Sweden, beating royals and athletes in a survey carried out by ICA-kuriren and Sifo. In the previous year she had attained second place. Wallström was modest in response stating that "it might be because I'm so far away". On 16 November 2007, Margot Wallström, became Chair of the Council of Women World Leaders Ministerial Initiative. This position was previously held by former U.S. Secretary of State Madeleine K. Albright.

=== United Nations Special Representative on Sexual Violence in Conflict, 2010–2012 ===
On 31 January 2010, the Secretary-General of the United Nations, Ban Ki-moon, announced at the African Union summit in Ethiopia his intention to nominate Wallström as his first ever United Nations Special Representative on Sexual Violence in Conflict. As a reaction, Wallström said that she felt "honoured" and "humble" to have been chosen for the job, which she started in April 2010.

In August 2010, Ban sent Wallström to the Democratic Republic of the Congo to help investigate claims that rebel fighters raped more than 150 women and baby boys over four days within miles of a UN base in the country. Wallström later addressed the United Nations Security Council in a September 2010 session on the use of sexual violence as a weapon by both rebel militias and government troops in the eastern provinces of the DRC. In her speech, she demonstrated that the rapes in the North Kivu and South Kivu provinces "were not an isolated incident but part of a broader pattern of widespread systematic rape and pillage".

On 18 September 2010, Wallström confirmed that when her assignment with the UN came to an end in February 2012, she would become the chair of the University Board at Lund University in Sweden.

=== Minister of Foreign Affairs of Sweden, 2014–2019 ===
On 3 October 2014, when the Social Democratic leader Stefan Löfven became Prime Minister, Wallström was appointed to the Swedish government as Minister of Foreign Affairs. On 30 October 2014, Wallström became the first EU foreign minister to recognise the State of Palestine, with a view to "facilitate a peace agreement by making the parties less unequal"; as a result, Israel the same day recalled its ambassador for consultations. Although a visit by Wallström to Israel had been planned for January 2015, Israel's foreign minister Avigdor Lieberman and prime minister Benjamin Netanyahu declined to receive her. Wallström's diplomatic immunity status in Israel was also revoked which meant that if she visited Israel she would do as an individual rather than an official of a foreign state, which would normally mean enjoying protection by security services. In a March 2018 interview, she stated that the intent behind the recognition was to speed up the process towards a Two-state solution but also admitted that no progress on that issue had been made.

In December 2014, Wallström called in the Russian ambassador to Sweden, Victor Ivanovitj Tatarintsev, over the behaviour of a Russian military jet which Swedish authorities said had caused an SAS flight from Copenhagen to Poznań, Poland, to change course off southern Sweden; the incident inflamed sensitivities over Russian flights in the Nordic region, driven in part by tensions over separatism in eastern Ukraine. On 11 September 2015, she again summoned Russia's ambassador to explain comments from the Russian foreign ministry warning of "consequences" if Sweden joins NATO.

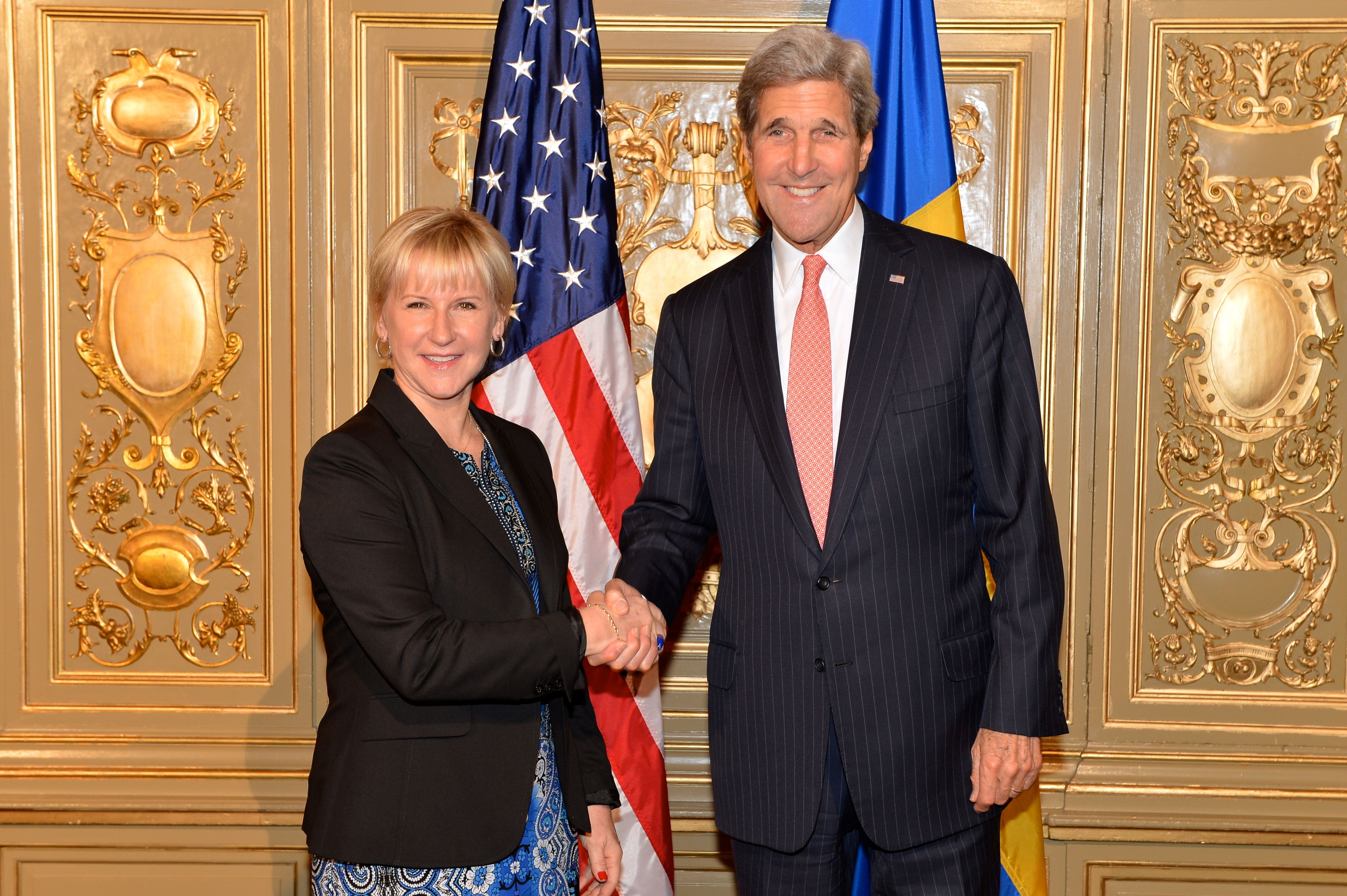
Wallström with U.S. Secretary of State John Kerry, 1 October 2015

In January 2015, Wallström tweeted criticism of Saudi Arabia's flogging of human rights activist blogger Raif Badawi, calling it a "cruel attempt to silence modern forms of expression". In May 2015, United Nations Secretary-General Ban Ki-moon appointed Wallström as member of the High-Level Panel on Humanitarian Financing, an initiative aimed at preparing recommendations for the 2016 World Humanitarian Summit. One of Wallström's main foreign policy goals was to secure one of the non-permanent seats for Sweden on the UN Security Council in the 2016 elections. This was achieved on 28 June 2016.

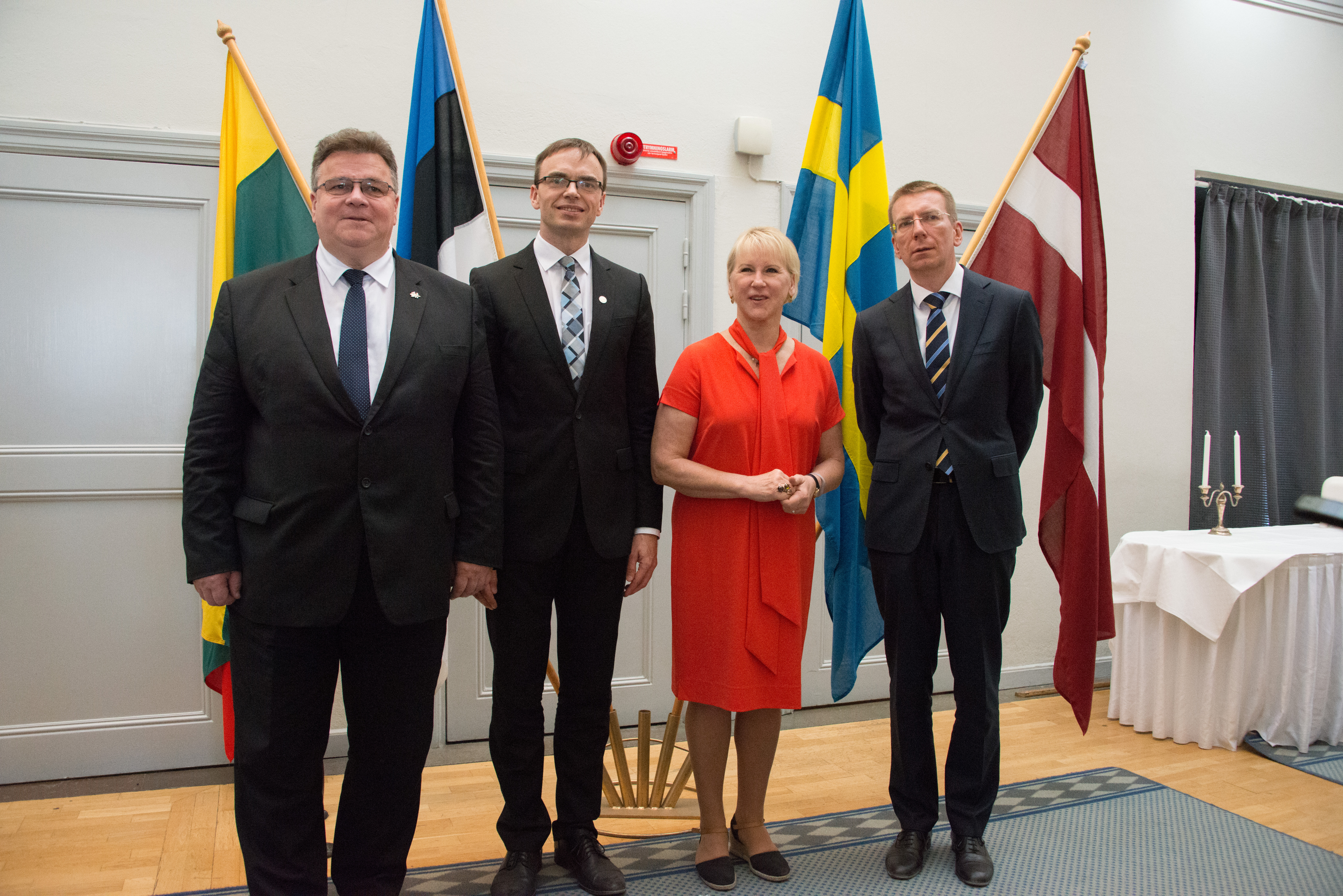
Wallström with Estonian Foreign Minister Sven Mikser, Latvian Foreign Minister Edgars Rinkēvičs and Lithuanian Foreign Minister Linas Antanas Linkevičius, on 26 May 2018

In February 2018, Wallström cancelled her visit to Turkey that was due in two weeks to protest the Turkish invasion of northern Syria aimed at ousting U.S.-backed Syrian Kurds from the enclave of Afrin. In December 2018, Wallström met with Iranian deputy foreign minister Abbas Araghchi in her office, a meeting which was unannounced by the Swedish Ministry for Foreign Affairs.

== Political positions ==
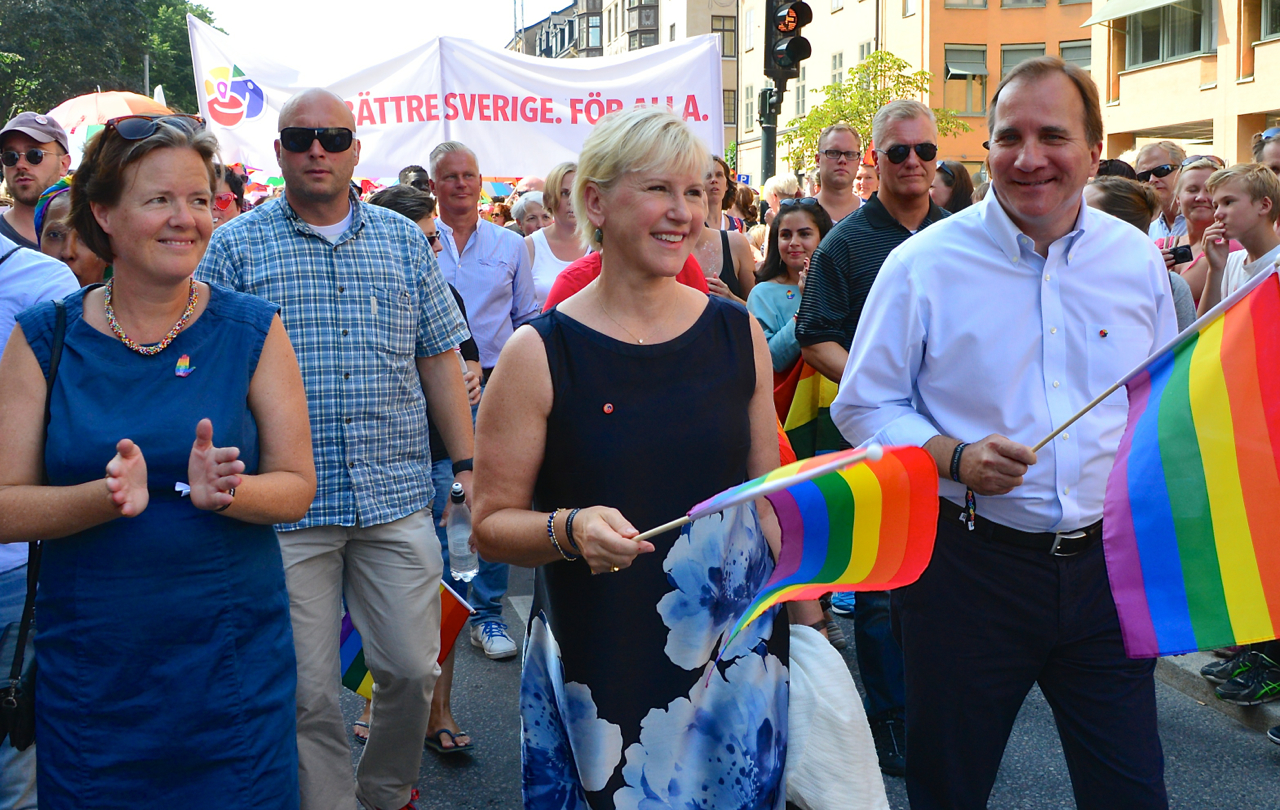
The Stockholm Pride parade in August 2014

Wallström "promised a 'feminist' foreign policy when her Social Democrats formed the coalition government" in October 2014. She has criticised the lack of women's rights in Saudi Arabia. The Spectator, the oldest continuously published magazine in the English language, wrote:

The Swedish foreign minister denounced the subjugation of women in Saudi Arabia. As the theocratic kingdom prevents women from travelling, conducting official business or marrying without the permission of male guardians, and as girls can be forced into child marriages where they are effectively raped by old men, she was telling no more than the truth.

On 10 March 2015 Sweden announced it would revoke a weapons export agreement with Saudi Arabia that had been in place since 2005. Saudi Arabia retaliated by stopping visa issues for Swedish businesspeople, boycotting Wallström's speech from the Arab League, temporarily withdrawing their ambassador from Sweden, and refusing to accept four Amazonian monkeys from a Swedish zoo.

King Carl XVI Gustaf then offered to mediate with the Saudi king, and a fellow Social Democrat member of the government, Björn von Sydow, travelled to meet King Salman bin Abdul Aziz and Prince Mohammad bin Salman Al Saud, taking him private letters from the Swedish King and from Prime Minister Stefan Löfven. These have remained classified, but in a press conference on 28 March, Wallström said: "I am very pleased to announce that we can normalize our relations immediately, and that we are able to welcome the Saudi ambassador back to Sweden. It is deeply satisfying that we have been able to clear the misunderstanding that we insulted the world religion Islam."

Wallström has called for more articles on Wikipedia about women-related topics.

== Controversies ==
=== European integration ===
In 2005, Wallström, in her capacity as EU Commissioner responsible for communications, came under pressure to justify her handling of a controversial speech that linked opposition to European integration with Nazi genocide, after it emerged she had changed the version published on the internet to remove the controversial passage. The original version of the speech, given to journalists ahead of Wallström's visit to Terezín in the Czech Republic to mark the 60th anniversary of the liberation of the Nazi concentration camp, suggested that scrapping the idea of a supranational Europe could put the continent back on the road to a holocaust.

=== Israel ===
In the aftermath of the November 2015 Paris attacks in which 137 were murdered, Wallström told Swedish television network SVT2: "To counteract the radicalization we must go back to the situation such as the one in the Middle East of which not the least the Palestinians see that, for us, there is no future: we must either accept a desperate situation or resort to violence." The Israeli government reacted angrily to Wallström's linking the attacks to the Israeli–Palestinian conflict, summoning the Swedish ambassador and saying Wallström's statement bordered on antisemitism and blood libel.

In December 2015, Wallström denounced the ongoing wave of Palestinian knife and car-ramming attacks in Israel. On 12 January 2016, Wallström called for an investigation into whether Israel was guilty of the extrajudicial killings of Palestinians during the violence, causing further anger in the Israeli political establishment. The Foreign Ministry of Israel issued an official statement saying that Wallström's "irresponsible and delirious statements are giving support to terrorism and encouraging violence". This also caused further deterioration in Israel-Sweden relations, and Deputy Foreign Minister of Israel Tzipi Hotovely declared that Swedish politicians of the rank of deputy minister and above are not welcome in Israel. Though she later clarified that it was only the Foreign Minister and her aids what are not welcome. International law expert Noah Feldman stated Wallström misunderstands international law, which does not apply in these cases. The Simon Wiesenthal Center placed Wallström at place eight on its annual list of the worst "anti-semitic/anti-israel incidents".

Although she has criticized Israel, Wallström opposes the Boycott, Divestment, and Sanctions (BDS) movement, supports Israel's right to defend itself, and is in favor of the two-state solution to the Israeli–Palestinian conflict. She expressed her condemnation of BDS during an "Israel day" conference held by the Jewish community in Sweden. During Wallström's December 2016 visit to Israel and the Palestinian Authority, many Israeli officials, including Prime Minister Benjamin Netanyahu, refused to meet her, citing scheduling conflicts. Some sources suggest that the refusal stemmed from Wallström's policy on Israeli–Palestinian conflict. Wallström welcomed the UN Security Council Resolution 2334 and said it confirms the position of both the EU and Sweden on the continued Israeli settlement of the occupied West Bank.

=== Rented apartment ===
On 15 January 2016, Aftonbladet published information that Wallström was one of several labour officials who rented apartment in Stockholm, owned by the Swedish Municipal Workers' Union, bypassing an average eight-year waiting list. Wallström replied that she acted in good faith and received a confirmation from highest-ranking officials, that all norms and rules were followed. Wallström accused the union's general secretary Annelie Nordström of not being truthful. The affair caused a controversy and prompted an investigation by a special prosecutor. The prosecutor closed the investigation in May 2016 and cleared Wallström, stating that there was no evidence any crime had been committed.

=== Turkish child sex tweet ===
On 24 August 2016 Wallström tweeted that "Turkish decision to allow sex with children under 15 must be reversed. Children need more protection, not less, against violence, sex abuse." This was after the Constitutional Court of Turkey cancelled a constitutional provision that made all sexual activities with children under the age of 15 criminal as sexual abuse. Turkish foreign minister Mevlüt Çavuşoğlu summoned Swedish ambassador for reprimand meeting and deputy prime minister Mehmet Simsek accused Wallström of being misinformed and acting without checking all facts. The original case was brought to the Constitutional Court by a lower court that was afraid there is no legal discrimination between teenagers that may understand the meaning of sex and toddlers that do not understand it.

== Other activities ==
=== Corporate boards ===
- Edberg Dialog, Member of the Board
- Ica Gruppen, Member of the board of directors (2013–2014)

=== Non-profit organizations ===
- Centre for Humanitarian Dialogue (HD), Member of the Board (since 2020)
- Centre for Feminist Foreign Policy (CFFP), Member of the Advisory Board
- European Council on Foreign Relations (ECFR), Member
- International Crisis Group, Member of the Board of Trustees
- International Gender Champions (IGC), Member
- Institute for Human Rights & Business (IHRB), Chair of the International Advisory Council
- Mary Robinson Foundation – Climate Justice (MRFCJ), Member of the International Advisory Council
- Svenska PostkodStiftelsen, Member of the board of directors
- Enough Project, Fellow
- Global Challenge Foundation, Member of the Board (2013–2014)
- Institute for Human Rights and Business, Advisor (2012–2014), Chair (2020–present)
- International Institute for Democracy and Electoral Assistance (IDEA), Member of the Advisory Board (2011–2014)
- Lund University, Chairwoman of the University Board (2012–2014)

== Recognition ==
- 2001 – Honorary doctor at Chalmers University, Sweden
- 2002 – European Commissioner of the Year (by European Voice)
- 2004 – Honorary doctor at Mälardalen University, Sweden
- 2004 – IAIA Global Environmental Award
- 2005 – Honorary Doctor of Humane Letters Degree, University of Massachusetts Lowell, Lowell
- 2008 – Göteborg Award for Sustainable Development (jointly with Theo Colborn, Jan Ahlbom and Ulf Duus
- 2009 – Monismanien Prize for Freedom of Speech
- 2016 – Grand Star of the Order of Jerusalem, State of Palestine

== Personal life ==
Wallström has been married to her husband, Håkan, since 1984. She has two sons. She lives in Stockholm and Värmland.

== Publications ==
- 2007 Foreword to Al Gore's Swedish translation of the book An Inconvenient Truth.
- 2004 Book (together with MEP Göran Färm): The People's Europe or Why is it so hard to love the EU?

== See also ==
- List of foreign ministers in 2017
- List of current foreign ministers

Political offices
Preceded by Ulf Lönnqvist	Minister of Civil Affairs; 1988–1991	Post discontinued
Preceded by Birgit Friggebo	Minister for Culture; 1994–1996	Succeeded by Marita Ulvskog
Preceded by Ingela Thalén	Minister for Social Affairs; 1996–1998	Succeeded by Anders Sundström
Preceded by Anita Gradin	Swedish European Commissioner; 1999–2009	Succeeded by Cecilia Malmström
Preceded by Ritt Bjerregaard	European Commissioner for the Environment; 1999–2004	Succeeded by Stavros Dimas
Preceded by Loyola de Palacio	First Vice President of the European Commission; 2004–2009	Succeeded by Catherine Ashton
New office	European Commissioner for Institutional Relations and Communication Strategy; 2004–2009	Succeeded by Maroš Šefčovič as European Commissioner for Inter-Institutional Relations and Administration
Preceded by Jan Björklund	Deputy Prime Minister Serving with: Åsa Romson (honorary title) 2014–2016; Isabella Lövin (honorary title) 2016–2019; 2014–2019	Succeeded by Morgan Johansson
Preceded by Carl Bildt	Minister for Foreign Affairs; 2014–2019	Succeeded by Ann Linde
Lines of succession
First	Swedish governmental line of succession	Succeeded by Ylva Johansson
Order of precedence
Preceded by Isabella Lövin	Order of Precedence of Sweden	Succeeded by Ylva Johansson
