= Minister for Nordic Cooperation (Sweden) =

Swedish cabinet position

- Minister för nordiskt samarbete
- Lesser coat of arms of Sweden

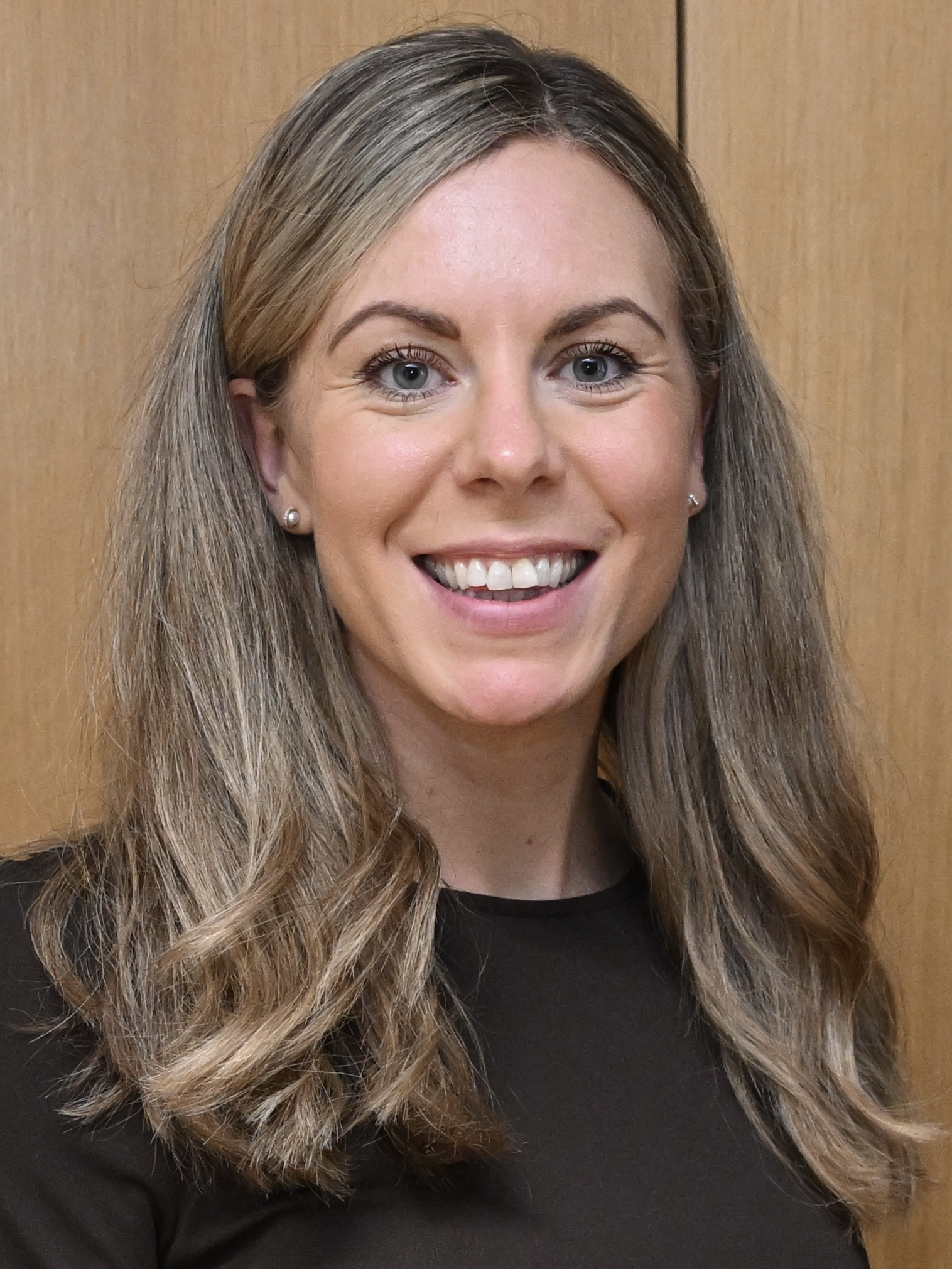
- Incumbent; Jessica Rosencrantz since 10 September 2024
- Appointer: The Prime Minister
- Inaugural holder: Kjell-Olof Feldt
- Formation: 1970
- Website: www.sweden.gov.se

The Minister for Nordic Cooperation (Swedish: Minister för nordiskt samarbete) is a cabinet minister within the Swedish Government and appointed by the Prime Minister of Sweden.

The minister is responsible for issues regarding Nordic affairs. The current minister Jessica Rosencrantz is also responsible for Sweden's EU Affairs.

== List of ministers for Nordic cooperation ==
Name	Term	Political party	Prime Minister
Kjell-Olof Feldt	1970–1976	Social Democrats	Olof Palme
Johannes Antonsson	1976–1978	Centre Party	Thorbjörn Fälldin
Bertil Hansson	1978–1979	People's Party	Ola Ullsten
Staffan Burenstam Linder	1979–1981	Moderate Party	Thorbjörn Fälldin
Björn Molin	1981–1982	Centre Party	Thorbjörn Fälldin
Svante Lundkvist	1982–1986	Social Democrats	Olof Palme
Ulf Lönnqvist	1986–1989	Social Democrats	Ingvar Carlsson
Mats Hellström	1989–1991	Social Democrats	Ingvar Carlsson
Olof Johansson	1991–1993	Centre Party	Carl Bildt
Börje Hörnlund	1993–1994	Centre Party	Carl Bildt
Mats Hellström	1994–1996	Social Democrats	Ingvar Carlsson
Margareta Winberg	1996–1997	Social Democrats	Göran Persson
Leif Pagrotsky	1997–2002	Social Democrats	Göran Persson
Berit Andnor	2002–2006	Social Democrats	Göran Persson
Cristina Husmark Pehrsson	2006–2010	Moderate Party	Fredrik Reinfeldt
Ewa Björling	2010–2014	Moderate Party	Fredrik Reinfeldt
Kristina Persson	2014–2016	Social Democrats	Stefan Löfven
Margot Wallström	2016–2019	Social Democrats	Stefan Löfven
Ann Linde	2019	Social Democrats	Stefan Löfven
Anna Hallberg	2019–2022	Social Democrats	Stefan Löfven
Anna Hallberg	2019–2022	Social Democrats	Magdalena Andersson
Jessika Roswall	2022–2024	Moderate Party	Ulf Kristersson
Jessica Rosencrantz	2024–	Moderate Party	Ulf Kristersson

== See also ==
- Minister for Nordic Cooperation (Denmark)
- Minister for Nordic Cooperation (Finland)
- Minister for Nordic Cooperation (Iceland)
