= Minister for EU Affairs (Sweden) =

Swedish cabinet position

- EU-minister
- Lesser coat of arms of Sweden

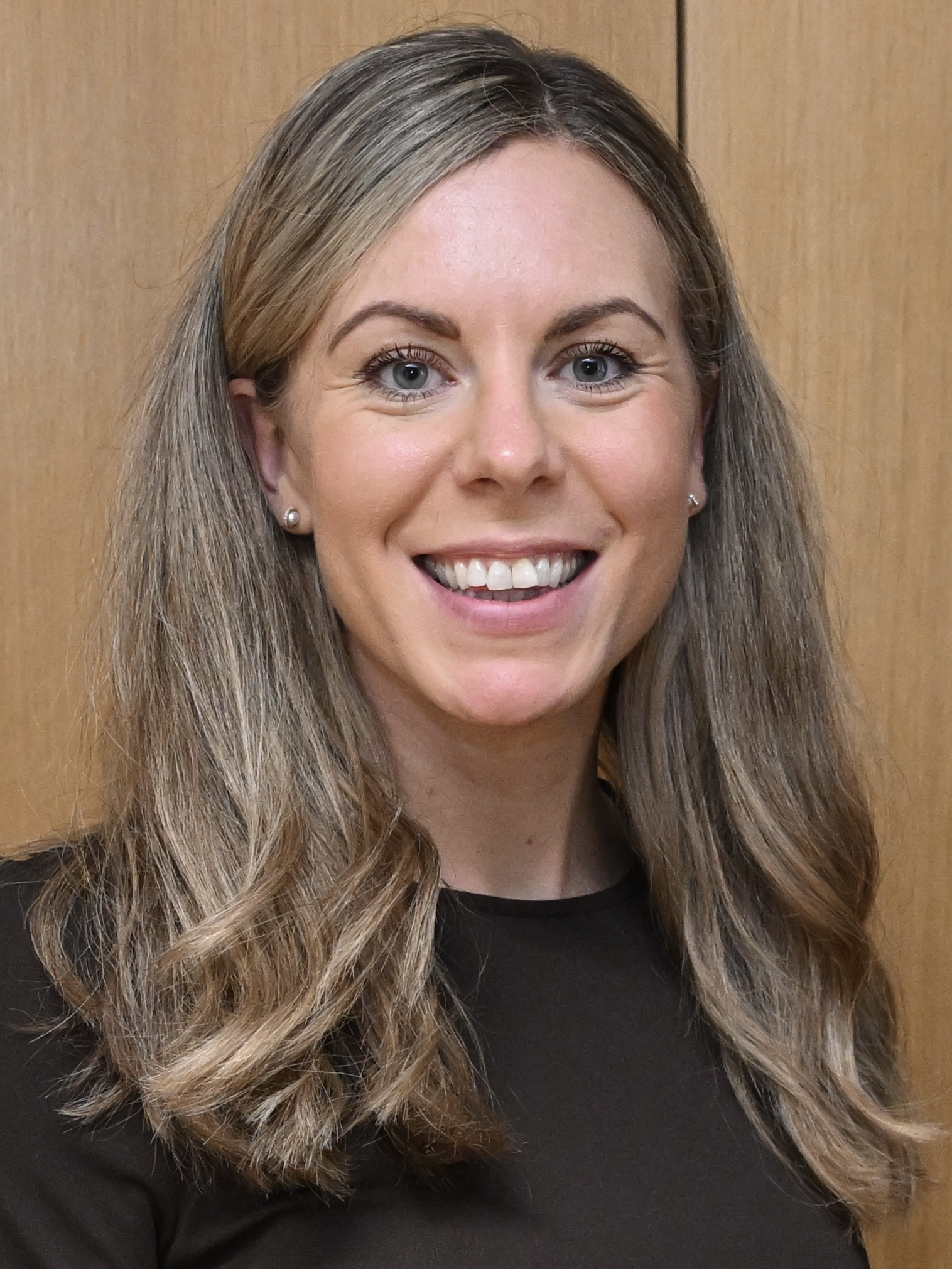
- Incumbent; Jessica Rosencrantz since 10 September 2024
- Member of: The Government
- Appointer: The Prime Minister
- Inaugural holder: Ulf Dinkelspiel
- Formation: 1991-10-04
- Abolished: 1996–2005, 2014–2016
- Website: www.government.se

The Minister for European Union Affairs is a cabinet minister who is part of the Swedish Government and appointed by the prime minister. The minister is directly under the Prime Minister's Office and is responsible for overall questions about the European Union, such as the strategy for growth and employment, the financial perspective, the Lisbon Treaty and the anchoring of EU membership.

The office was abolished on two occasion, between 1996 and 2005, and then in 2014–2016. On 10 September 2024, Jessica Rosencrantz was appointed minister for European Union affairs.

== List of ministers for European Union affairs ==
No.	Portrait	Minister for EU Affairs	Took office	Left office	Time in office	Party	Prime Minister
1	Ulf Dinkelspiel	Ulf Dinkelspiel (1939–2017)	4 October 1991	7 October 1994	3 years, 3 days	Moderate	Carl Bildt (M)
2	Mats Hellström	Mats Hellström (1942–2026)	7 October 1994	22 March 1996	1 year, 167 days	Social Democrats	Ingvar Carlsson (S)
Abolished 1996–2005
3	Bosse Ringholm	Bosse Ringholm (born 1942)	1 January 2005	6 October 2006	1 year, 278 days	Social Democrats	Göran Persson (S)
4	Cecilia Malmström	Cecilia Malmström (born 1968)	6 October 2006	10 February 2010	3 years, 127 days	Liberals	Fredrik Reinfeldt (M)
5	Birgitta Ohlsson	Birgitta Ohlsson (born 1975)	10 February 2010	3 October 2014	4 years, 235 days	Liberals	Fredrik Reinfeldt (M)
Abolished 2014–2016
6	Ann Linde	Ann Linde (born 1961)	25 May 2016	21 January 2019	2 years, 241 days	Social Democrats	Stefan Löfven (S)
7	Hans Dahlgren	Hans Dahlgren (born 1948)	21 January 2019	18 October 2022	3 years, 270 days	Social Democrats	Stefan Löfven (S); Magdalena Andersson
8	Jessika Roswall	Jessika Roswall (born 1972)	18 October 2022	10 September 2024	1 year, 328 days	Moderate	Ulf Kristersson (M)
9	Jessica Rosencrantz	Jessica Rosencrantz (born 1987)	10 September 2024	Incumbent	1 year, 362 days	Moderate	Ulf Kristersson (M)
