= Hans Dahlgren =

Swedish politician (born 1948)

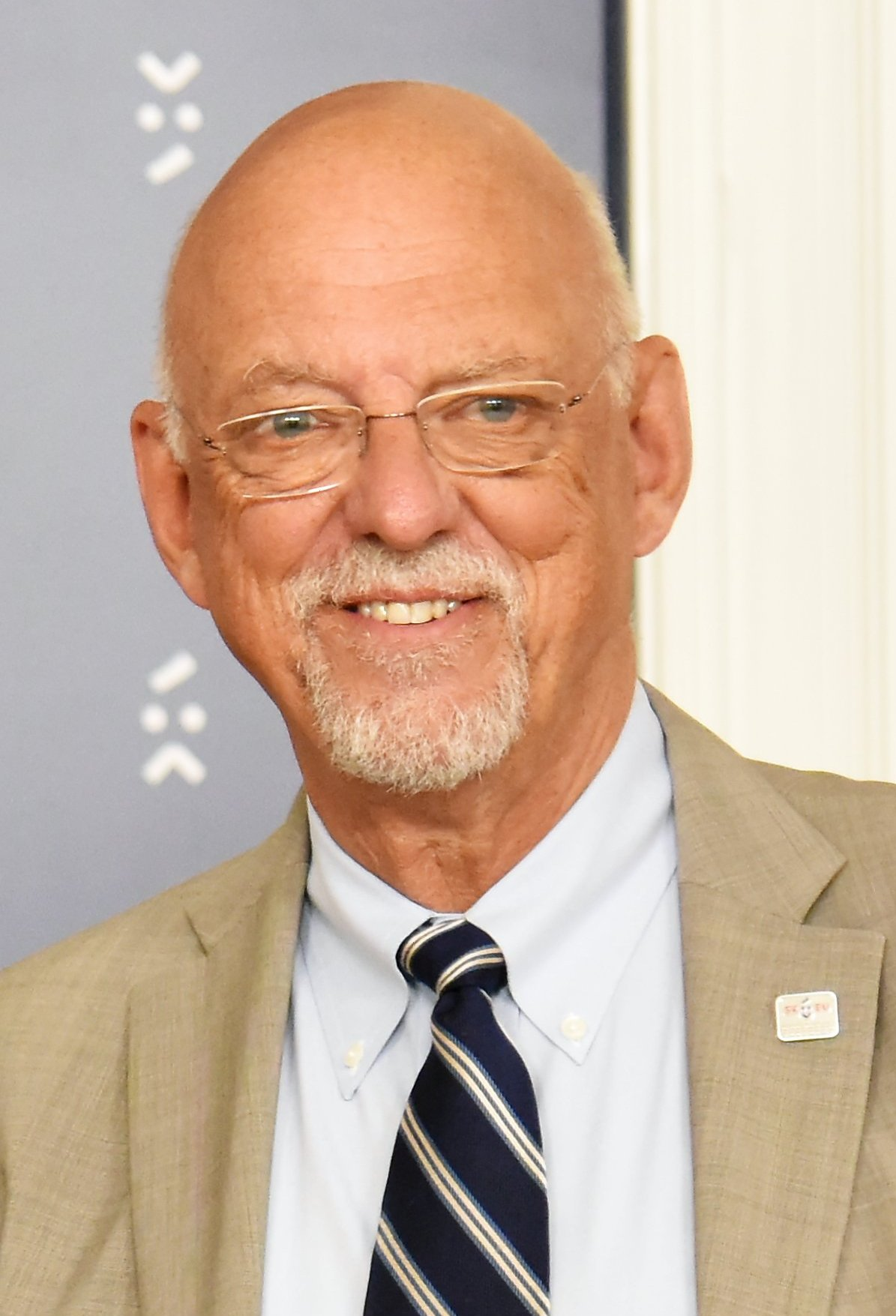

Minister for European Union Affairs
- In office 21 January 2019 – 17 October 2022
- Monarch: Carl XVI Gustaf
- Prime Minister: Stefan Löfven; Magdalena Andersson
- Preceded by: Ann Linde
- Succeeded by: Jessika Roswall

Personal details
- Born: 16 March 1948 (age 78) Uppsala, Sweden
- Party: Social Democrats

Hans Eric Albert Dahlgren (born 16 March 1948) is a Swedish politician and former diplomat. A member of the Swedish Social Democratic Party, he served as Minister for European Union Affairs from January 2019 to 17 October 2022 under Prime Minister Stefan Löfven; he retained the position in the Andersson Cabinet.

== Career ==
Between 1997 and 2012, Dahlgren held various high-level positions in Sweden's diplomatic service, including as Swedish representative at the United Nations Security Council (1997–1998); as Permanent Representative to the United Nations in New York (1997–2000); as State Secretary for Foreign Affairs (2000–2006); as Permanent Representative to the United Nations in Geneva (2007–2010); and as Ambassador for Human Rights at the Ministry for Foreign Affairs (2010–2012).

From 2014 until 2019, Dahlgren served as State Secretary for International and EU Affairs in the Prime Minister's Office.

On 13 May 2016, Dahlgren was among the guests invited to the state dinner hosted by U.S. President Barack Obama in honor of Nordic leaders Lars Løkke Rasmussen, Sauli Niinistö, Sigurður Ingi Jóhannsson, Erna Solberg and Löfven at the White House.

== Other activities ==
- World Economic Forum (WEF), Member of the Europe Policy Group (since 2017)

Diplomatic posts
Preceded by Peter Oswald	Permanent Representative of Sweden to the United Nations; 1997–2000	Succeeded by Pierre Schori
Preceded by Jan Eliasson	State Secretary for Foreign Affairs; 2000–2006	Succeeded by Frank Belfrage
Preceded by Elisabet Borsiin Bonnier	Permanent Representative of Sweden to the United Nations in Geneva; 2007–2010	Succeeded by Jan Knutsson
Political offices
Preceded by Ann Linde	Minister for European Union Affairs; 2019–2022	Succeeded by Jessika Roswall
