= Minister for Strategic Development and Nordic Cooperation =

Position formerly held by Kristina Persson

Minister for Strategic Development and Nordic Cooperation was a minister post in the Löfven I Cabinet from 2014 to 2016. It was held by Kristina Persson.
