= Anders Sundström =

Swedish banker and former politician (born 1952)

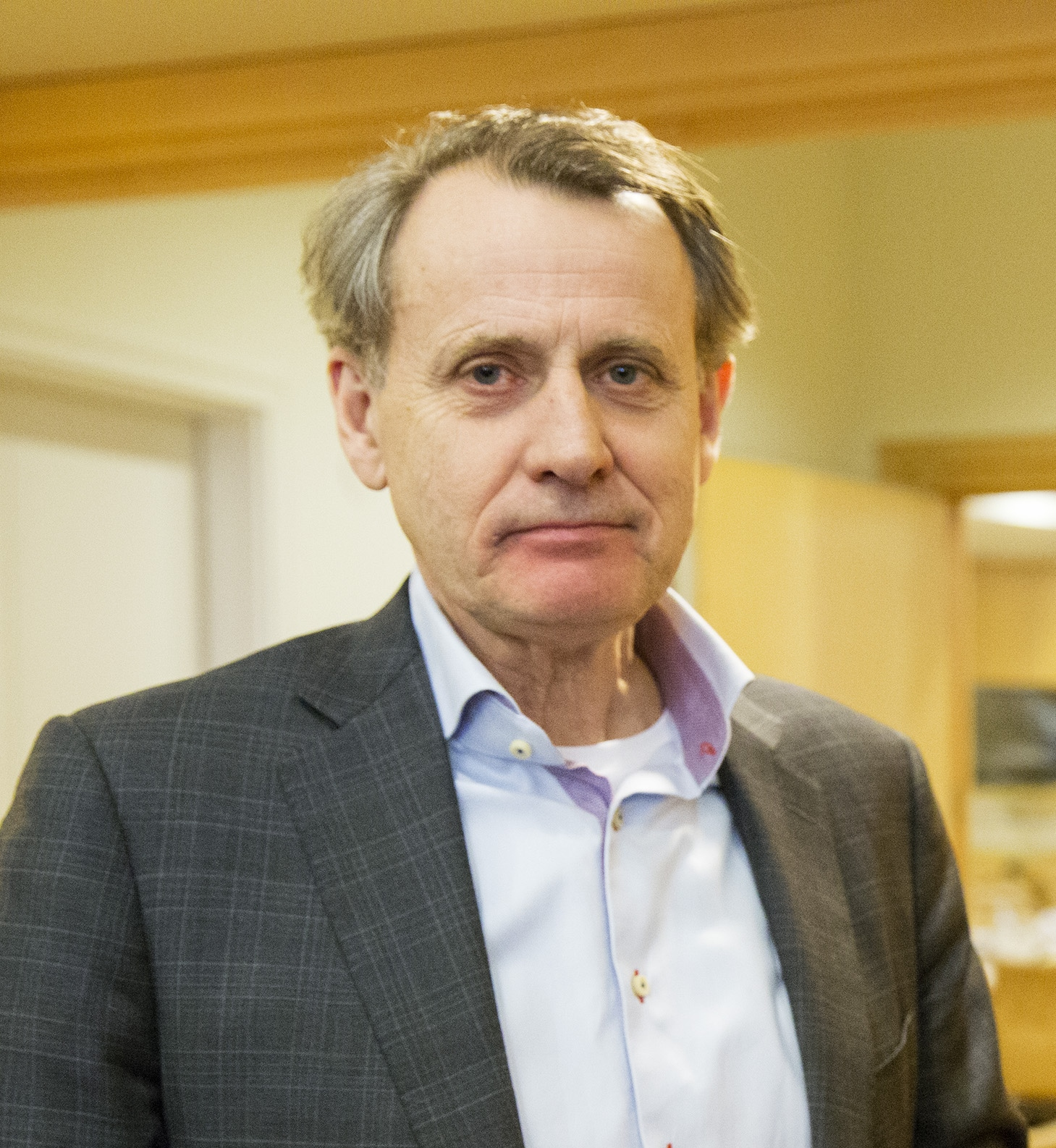
- Sundström in February 2015

Minister for Social Affairs
- In office 7 October 1998 – 26 October 1998
- Monarch: Carl XVI Gustaf
- Prime Minister: Göran Persson
- Preceded by: Margot Wallström
- Succeeded by: Lars Engqvist

Minister for Enterprise
- In office 22 March 1996 – 7 October 1998
- Monarch: Carl XVI Gustaf
- Prime Minister: Göran Persson
- Preceded by: Jörgen Andersson
- Succeeded by: Björn Rosengren

Minister for Employment
- In office 7 October 1994 – 22 March 1996
- Monarch: Carl XVI Gustaf
- Prime Minister: Ingvar Carlsson
- Preceded by: Börje Hörnlund
- Succeeded by: Margareta Winberg

Mayor of Piteå
- In office 1980–1994

Personal details
- Born: 26 July 1952 (age 74) Hudiksvall, Sweden
- Party: Social Democrats
- Education: Umeå university
- Profession: banker, politician

Anders Sundström (born 26 July 1952) is a Swedish banker, businessman and former politician of the Swedish Social Democratic Party.

== Biography ==
Sundström studied human geography and economics at Umeå University from 1972 to 1975, and became mayor of Piteå Municipality in 1980, at the age 27, the youngest at the time. He stayed as mayor until 1994.

Following the 1994 Swedish general election, when the Social Democrats returned to government, Sundström served as government minister. He was first minister for employment from 1994 to 1996, in the Carlsson III Cabinet. Following the formation of the Persson Cabinet, he was minister for enterprise from 1996 to 1998.

Following the 1998 election, Björn Rosengren was appointed minister for enterprise, a post that Sundström had wished to retain. Instead, he was offered the post of minister for social affairs, which he accepted after some hesitation. After having held the post for 20 days in October 1998, he changed his mind and resigned. Sundström served as Member of Parliament in 1998, following his resignation from the government.

In 1999 Sundström became the CEO of the Pitedalens Sparbank, a savings bank in his home region, which in 2001 was renamed Sparbanken Nord following a fusion with another bank.

In 2002 Sundström returned to parliament, following the 2002 election, and stayed until 2004. Sundström was appointed the CEO of insurance company Folksam in 2004, a post he held until 2013. He was then the chairman of Swedbank from 2013 to April 2016. A short time before Sundström had to leave the post as chairman he had sacked CEO Michael Wolf.

He was considered a possible contender for the leadership of the Social Democratic Party after Håkan Juholt's resignation in January 2012.

Sundström is domestic partner with Social Democratic politician Anna Hallberg.
