= Maria Malmer Stenergard =

Swedish politician (born 1981)

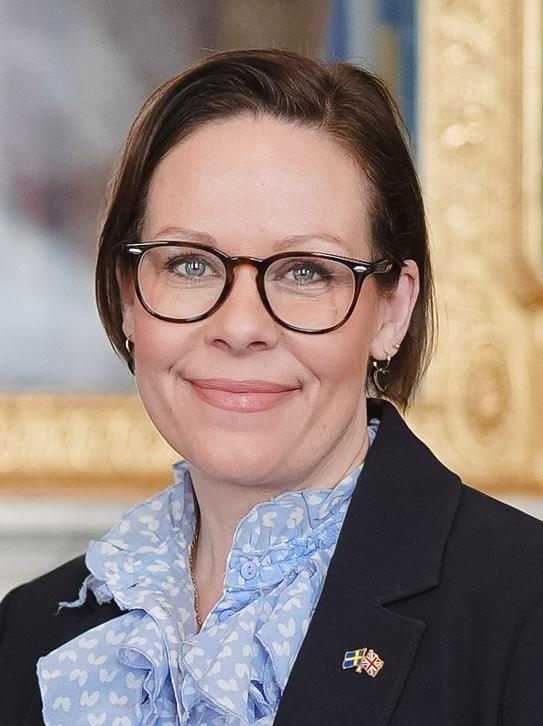
- Malmer Stenergard in 2025

Minister for Foreign Affairs
- Incumbent
- Assumed office 10 September 2024
- Monarch: Carl XVI Gustaf
- Prime Minister: Ulf Kristersson
- Preceded by: Tobias Billström

Minister for Migration and Asylum Policy
- In office 18 October 2022 – 10 September 2024
- Monarch: Carl XVI Gustaf
- Prime Minister: Ulf Kristersson
- Preceded by: Anders Ygeman
- Succeeded by: Johan Forssell

Member of the Riksdag for Skåne Northern and Eastern
- Incumbent
- Assumed office 29 September 2014

Personal details
- Born: Eva Maria Louise Malmer; 23 March 1981 (age 45) Kristianstad, Sweden
- Party: Moderate
- Education: Lund University (BA, LLM)

Eva Maria Louise Malmer Stenergard (born 23 March 1981) is a Swedish politician and jurist serving as Minister for Foreign Affairs since 2024. A member of the Moderate Party, she previously served as Minister for Migration and Asylum Policy from 2022 until 2024. She has been a Member of the Riksdag for Northern and Eastern Skåne since 2014.

== Ministerial career ==
=== Minister for Migration and Asylum Policy (2022–2024) ===
On 18 October 2022, Malmer Stenergard was appointed Minister for Migration and Asylum Policy in the cabinet of Ulf Kristersson. This role was seen as critical since migration was one of the key areas the new government was set to focus on.

In 2024, Malmer Stenergard announced that Sweden during that year had seen the lowest number of immigrants since 1997, and had for the first time in 50 years had more people migrating from Sweden than immigrating to Sweden. This was in line with the governments policy which she had implemented.

=== Minister for Foreign Affairs (2024–present) ===
On 10 September 2024, prime minister Ulf Kristersson reshuffled his cabinet. During this reshuffle Malmer Stenergard was made Minister for Foreign Affairs succeeding Tobias Billström who had recently resigned. During a press conference later the same day she said she would pursue a foreign policy that prioritised Sweden.

On 3 October 2024 during a debate in the Riksdag regarding Sweden's decision to abstain from voting on a United Nations General Assembly resolution calling for the end of Israeli occupation of Palestinian territories, a bag containing tomatoes and onions was hurled towards Malmer Stenergard from the Riksdag's public gallery. Malmer Stenergard retreated from the chamber following the event. The bag's contents had been smuggled in through the security controls by three pro-Palestine activists, by means of hiding them in their clothes. The activists were quickly apprehended by security and removed from the perimeters of the Riksdag. Malmer Stenergard called the event an attack on basic democratic values, a sentiment echoed by Speaker Andreas Norlén.

She and her Nordic counterparts signed a joint letter in late October condemning Israel's planned bill that would seek to ban the UNRWA from operating in the country and in effect the Palestinian areas. Furthermore, they urged the Knesset to reconsider passing the bill.

Malmer Stenergaard called the March 2025 Israeli attacks on the Gaza Strip "dangerous" and demanded an end to the violence.

==== List of international trips made by Maria Malmer Stenergard ====
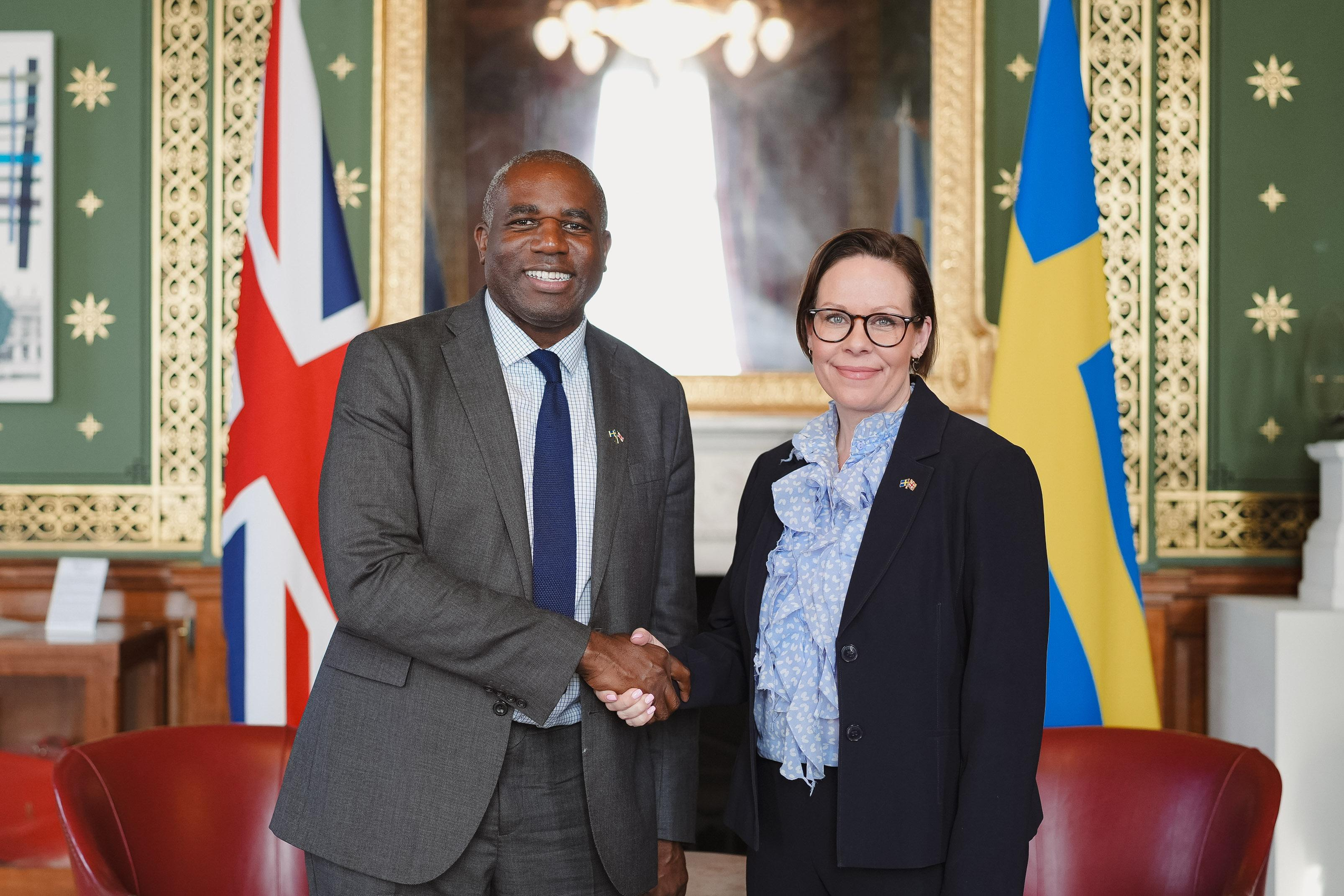
Malmer Stenergard shakes hands with Foreign Secretary David Lammy at a 1 May 2025 meeting in London.

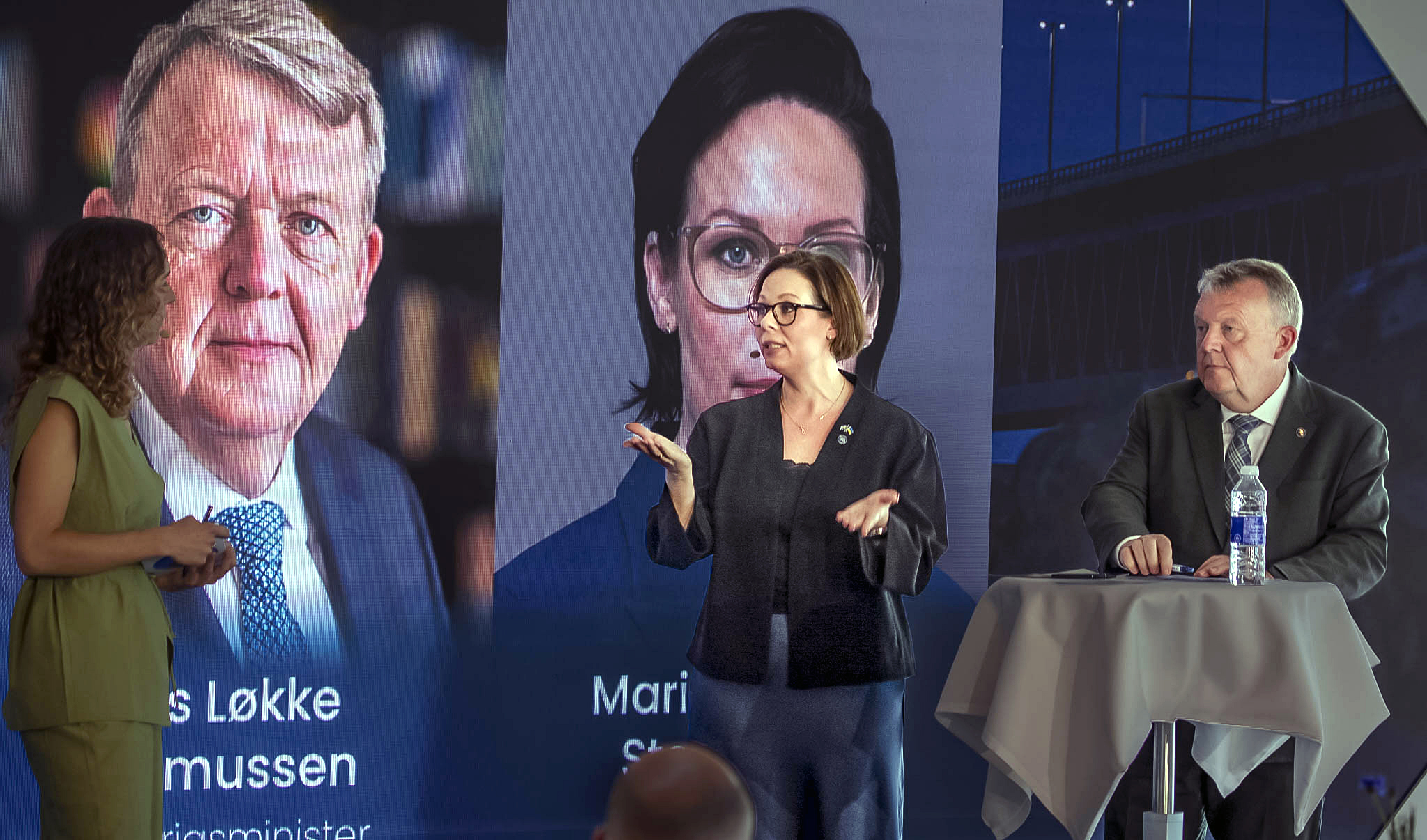
Malmer Stenergard delivers remarks at a 5 May 2025 panel as part of a trip to Copenhagen.

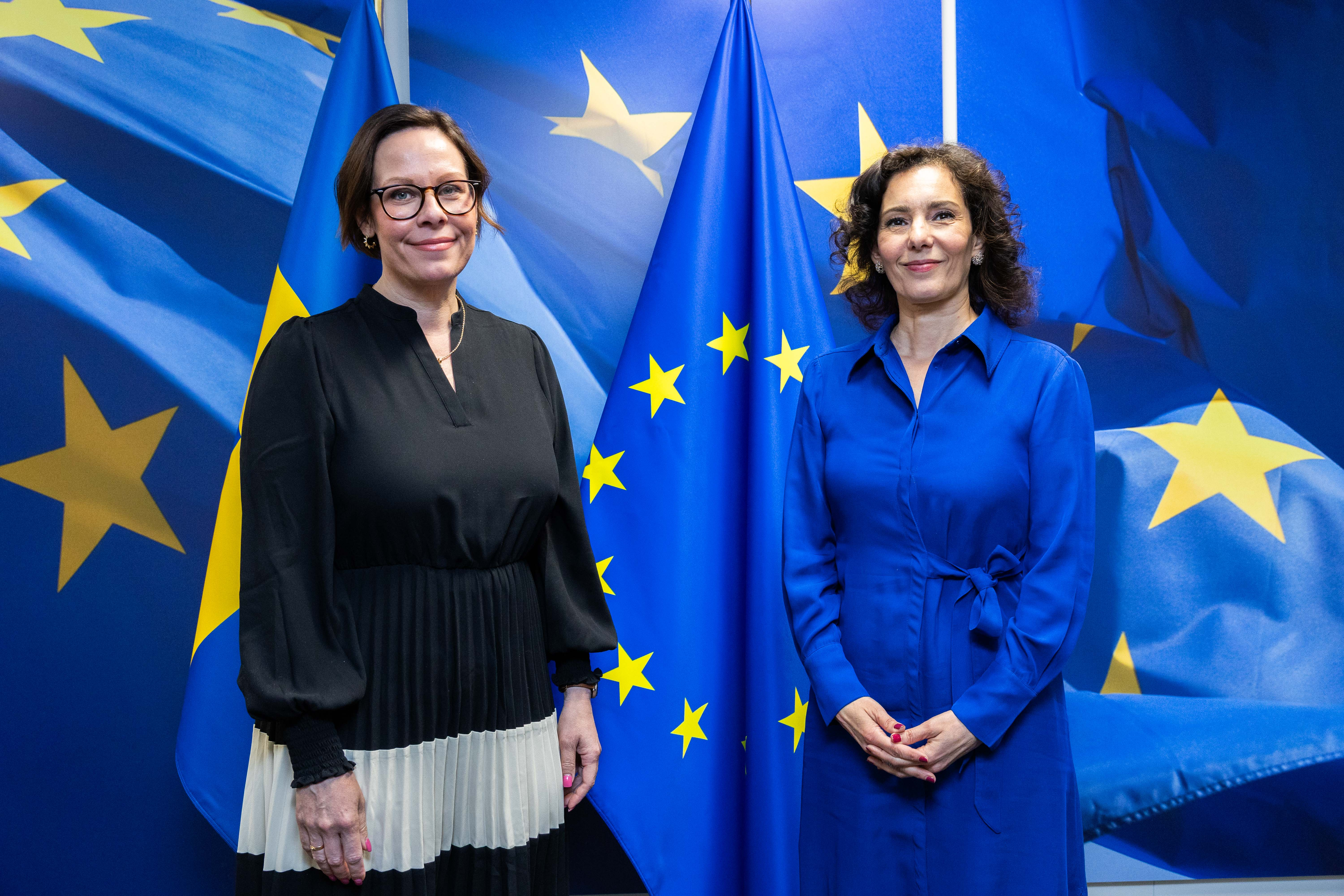
Malmer Stenergard photographed beside European Commissioner for Preparedness and Crisis Management Hadja Lahbib at a 11 June 2025 meeting in Brussels.

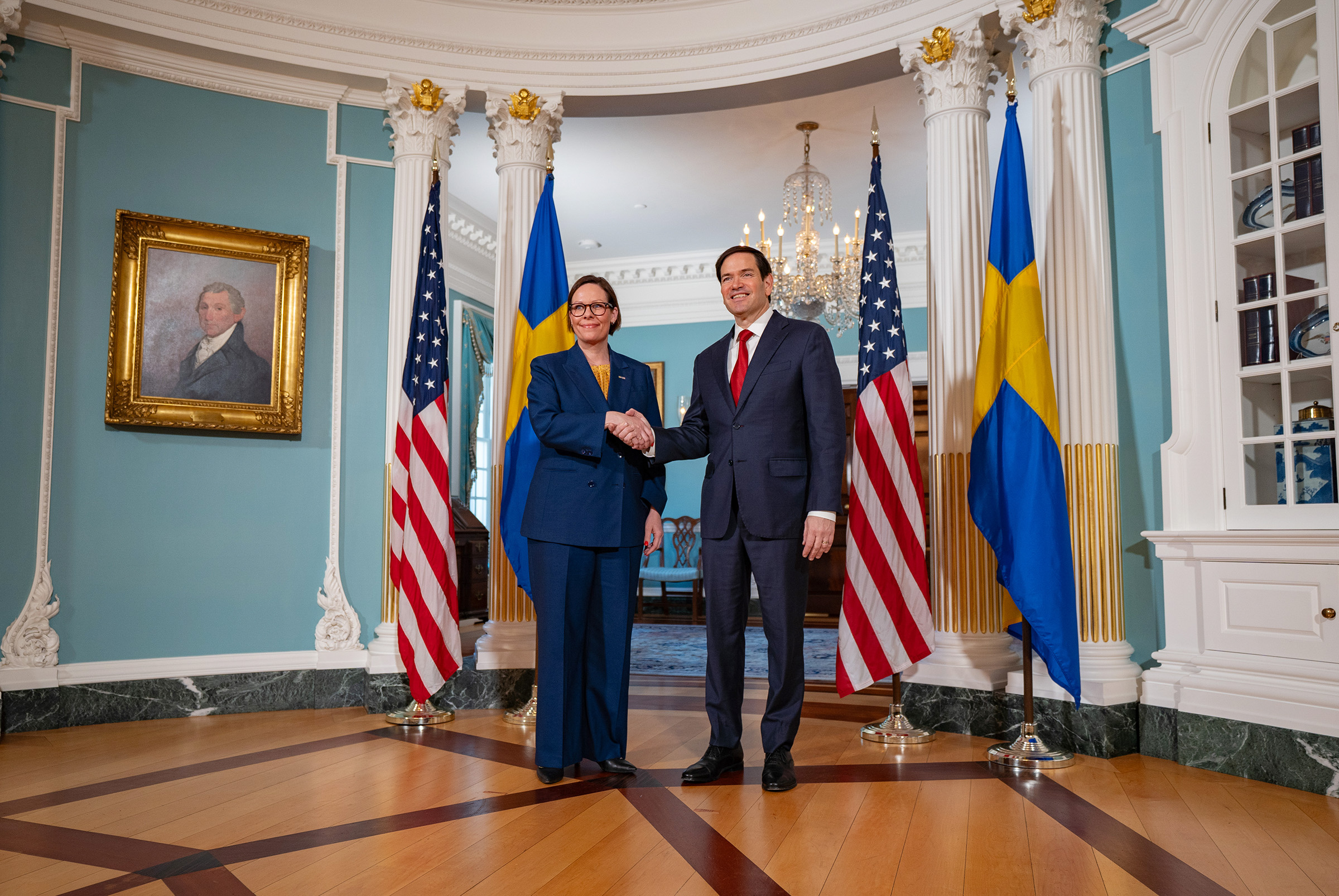
Malmer Stenergard shakes hands with United States Secretary of State Marco Rubio at a 20 June 2025 meeting in Washington, D.C..
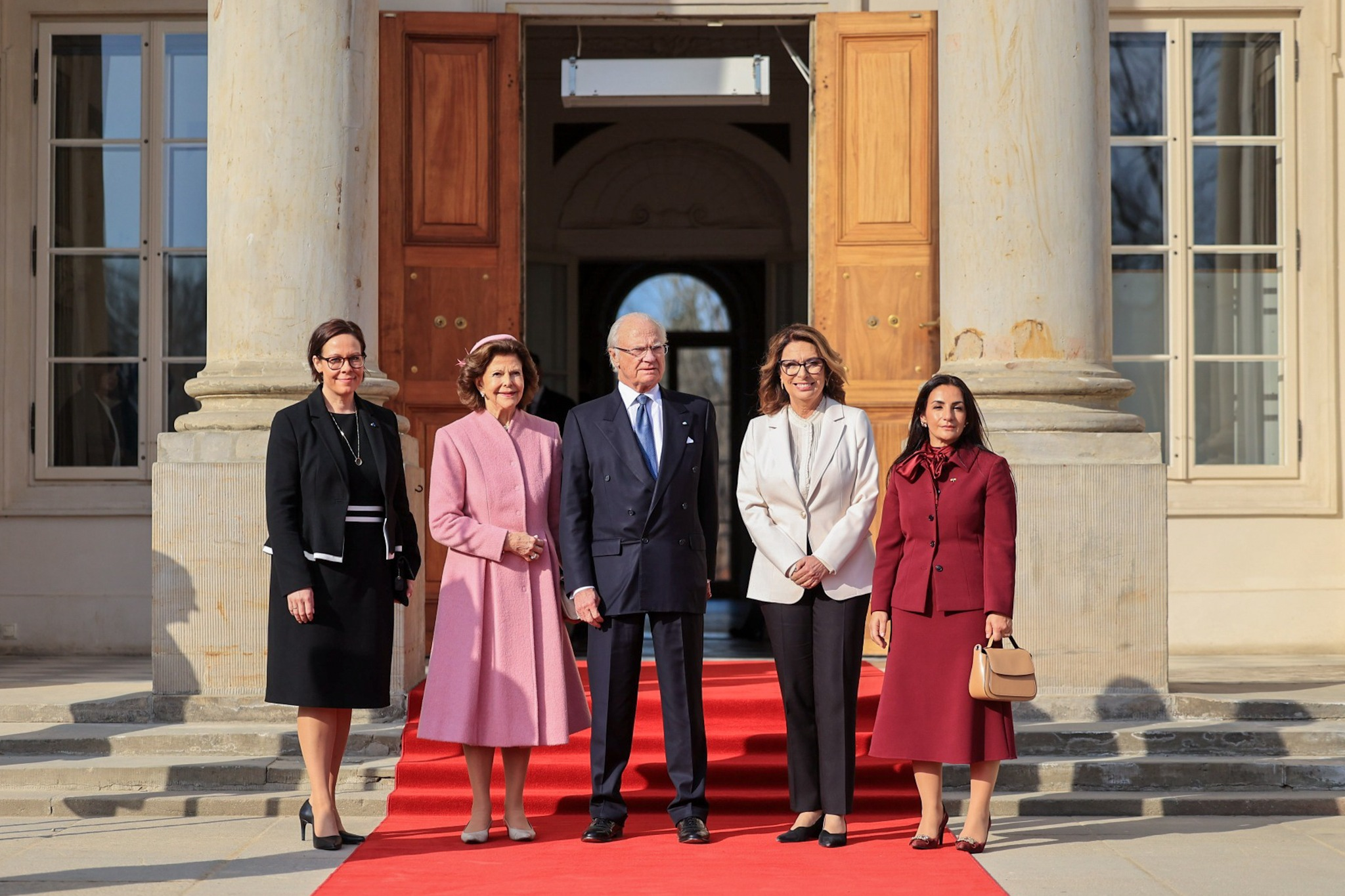
Malmer Stenergard accompanies the King and Queen of Sweden on official State Visit to Poland 10 March 2026.

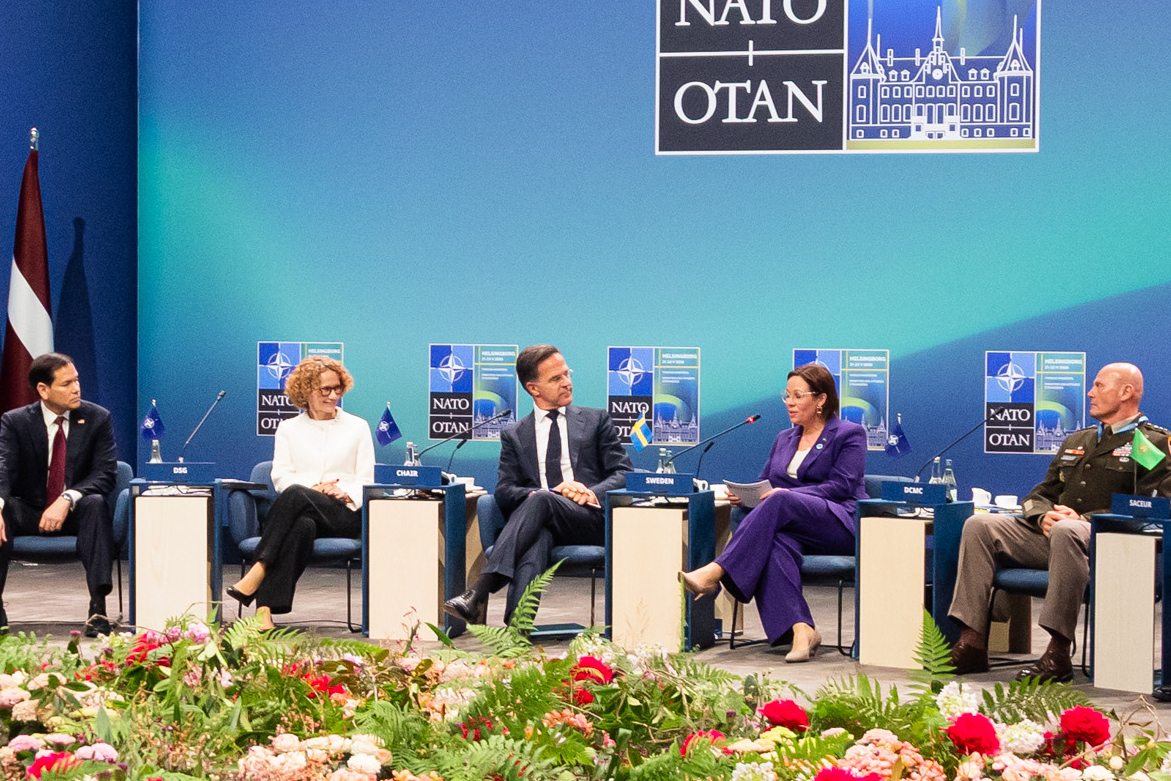
Malmer Stenergard welcomes foreign ministers taking part in the NATO Foreign Ministers Meeting in Helsingborg on 22 May 2026.

Malmer Stenergard takes part in a Meeting of the Coalition of the Willing in Kyiv 24 August 2026

Country	Location(s)	Dates	Source
Finland	Helsinki	13 September 2024	
United States	New York: New York City (79th United Nations General Assembly)	22–27 September 2024	
Canada	Iqaluit	28–29 September 2024	
Luxembourg	Luxembourg	14 October 2024	
Moldova	Chișinău	15 October 2024	
Germany	Berlin	21 October 2024	
Iceland	Reykjavík	28–31 October 2024	
Singapore	Singapore	19–21 November 2024	
Thailand	Bangkok	22 November 2024	
Belgium	Brussels	3–4 December 2024	
Malta	Valletta	5–6 December 2024	
Turkey	Ankara	21 January 2025	
Belgium	Brussels	27 January 2025	
Colombia	Bogotá	28–29 January 2025	
Peru	Lima	30–31 January 2025	
Denmark	Copenhagen	5 February 2025	
Latvia	Riga	7 February 2025	
Germany	Munich	14–16 February 2025	
Belgium	Brussels	24 February 2025	
India	New Delhi	17–18 March 2025	
Palestine	Ramallah	24–26 March 2025	
Israel	Jerusalem	24–26 March 2025	
Belgium	Brussels	3–4 April 2025	
Luxembourg	Luxembourg	14 April 2025	
Denmark	Bornholm	28–29 April 2025	
United Kingdom	London	1–2 May 2025	
Denmark	Copenhagen	7 May 2025	
Poland	Warsaw	7–8 May 2025	
Turkey	Antalya	14–15 May 2025	
Lithuania	Vilnius	2 June 2025	
Belgium	Brussels	11 June 2025	
United States	New York: New York City	18–19 June 2025	
United States	Washington, D.C.	20 June 2025	
Netherlands	The Hague	24–25 June 2025	
Bosnia and Herzegovina	Sarajevo and Srebrenica	10–11 July 2025	
Finland	Nuuksio	18–19 August 2025	
Ukraine	Uzhhorod	5 September 2025	
Germany	Berlin	16 September 2025	
United States	New York: New York City (80th United Nations General Assembly)	21–26 September 2025	
Zimbabwe	Victoria Falls	2–3 October 2025	
Japan	Tokyo, Hiroshima	13–14 October 2025	
South Korea	Seoul	15 October 2025	
China	Beijing	16–17 October 2025	
Poland	Warsaw	17 November 2025	
Belgium	Brussels	20 November 2025	
United Kingdom	London	27 November 2025	
Belgium	Brussels	3 December 2025	
Belgium	Brussels	15 December 2025	
Jordan	Amman	16 December 2025	
Eritrea	Asmara	17–18 December 2025	
Latvia	Ādaži (NATO Enhanced Forward Presence)	28 January 2026	
Belgium	Brussels	29 January 2026	
Germany	Munich	12–15 February 2026	
Belgium	Brussels	23 February 2026	
Poland	Warsaw	4 March 2026	
Poland	Warsaw	10–12 March 2026	
United States	Texas: Houston and Austin	16–18 March 2026	
United States	Virginia: Norfolk	18–19 March 2026	
Spain	Torrevieja	26 March 2026	
Ukraine	Kyiv	31 March 2026	
Ukraine	Lviv	17 April 2026	
Luxembourg	Luxembourg	21 April 2026	
Estonia	Kuressaare	29–30 April 2026	
Belgium	Brussels	11 May 2026	
Cyprus	Limassol	27–28 May 2026	
Hungary	Budapest	5 June 2026	
Saudi Arabia	Riyadh	8–10 June 2026	
Qatar	Doha	8–10 June 2026	
United Arab Emirates	Abu Dhabi	8–10 June 2026	
Luxembourg	Luxembourg	15 June 2026	
Poland	Gdańsk	25 June 2026	
Poland	Gdynia	29 June 2026	
Turkey	Ankara	7–8 July 2026	
Brazil	Brasilia	5–7 August 2026	
Colombia	Cali	5–7 August 2026	
Ukraine	Kyiv	24 August 2026	
Ireland	Wicklow	1–2 September 2026	
United States	New York: New York City (81st United Nations General Assembly)	22–28 September 2026	
Hungary	Budapest	23 October 2026	
Estonia	Tallinn	9 November 2026	
United Arab Emirates	Abu Dhabi	13–15 November 2026	

== Honours ==
Malmer Stenergard accepts the Estonian Ministry of Foreign Affairs’ Cross of Merit (First Class) from Estonian Foreign Minister Margus Tsahkna.

=== Foreign honours ===
- Iceland: Grand Cross of the Order of the Falcon (6 May 2025)
- Ukraine: Member Third Class of the Order of Princess Olga (5 September 2025)
- Estonia: Cross of Merit of the Ministry of Foreign Affairs, 1st Class (9 November 2026)
