= Ann Linde =

Swedish politician (born 1961)

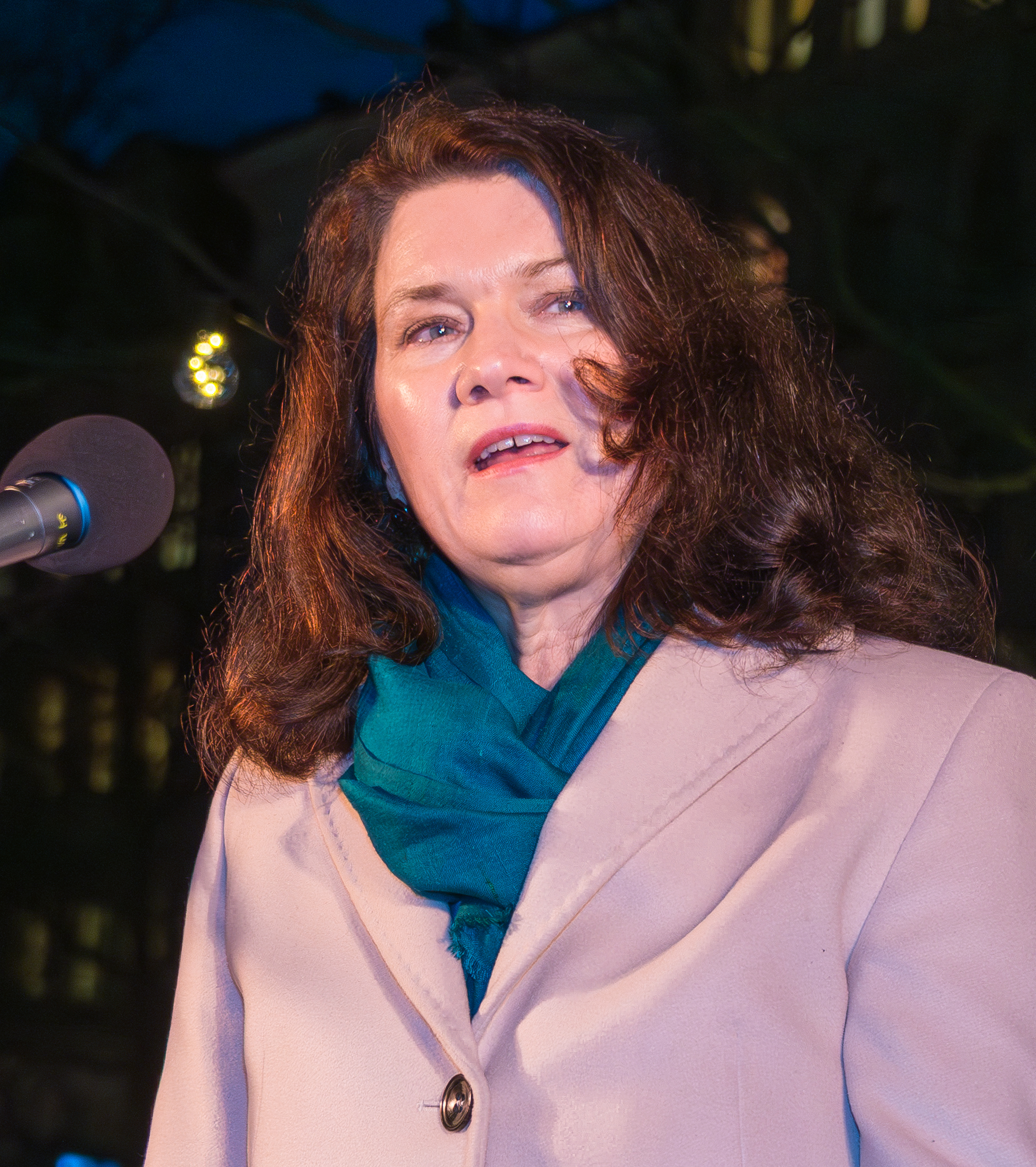
- Linde in 2020

Minister for Foreign Affairs
- In office 10 September 2019 – 18 October 2022
- Monarch: Carl XVI Gustaf
- Prime Minister: Stefan Löfven; Magdalena Andersson
- Preceded by: Margot Wallström
- Succeeded by: Tobias Billström

Chairperson-in-Office of the Organization for Security and Co-operation in Europe
- In office 1 January 2021 – 1 January 2022
- Preceded by: Edi Rama
- Succeeded by: Zbigniew Rau

Minister for Nordic Cooperation
- In office 21 January 2019 – 10 September 2019
- Prime Minister: Stefan Löfven
- Preceded by: Margot Wallström
- Succeeded by: Anna Hallberg

Minister of Foreign Trade
- In office 25 May 2016 – 10 September 2019
- Prime Minister: Stefan Löfven
- Preceded by: Mikael Damberg
- Succeeded by: Anna Hallberg

Minister for EU Affairs
- In office 25 May 2016 – 21 January 2019
- Prime Minister: Stefan Löfven
- Preceded by: Birgitta Ohlsson (2010–14)
- Succeeded by: Hans Dahlgren

Personal details
- Born: Ann Christin Linde; 4 December 1961 (age 64) Helsingborg, Sweden
- Party: Social Democratic Party
- Spouse: Mats Eriksson (m. 1989)
- Children: 2
- Occupation: Politician

Ann Christin Linde (born 4 December 1961) is a Swedish politician of the Social Democratic Party who served as Minister for Foreign Affairs in the government of Prime Minister Stefan Löfven and Magdalena Andersson from 2019 to 2022.

Linde previously served as Minister of Foreign Trade and Minister for Nordic Cooperation. Before that, she was the Minister for European Union Affairs and Trade for the Löfven Cabinet from 25 May 2016.

== Political career ==
Throughout the 1990s, Linde worked in government offices, including as the Ministry Secretary of Civil Affairs and the political advisor of the EU and Trade Minister Mats Hellström of Foreign Affairs and of Defense Minister Björn von Sydow on Ministry of Defence.

Linde worked as international secretary at the Social Democratic Party in Sweden from 2000 to 2013. From 2013 to 2014, she was the head of the International Department of the European Socialist Party (PES) in Brussels, an umbrella organization for all social-democratic parties in the EU.

From 2014 until 2016, Linde served as State Secretary for the Ministry of Justice In this capacity, she worked with Interior Minister Anders Ygeman.

=== Minister for Foreign Affairs (2019–2022) ===
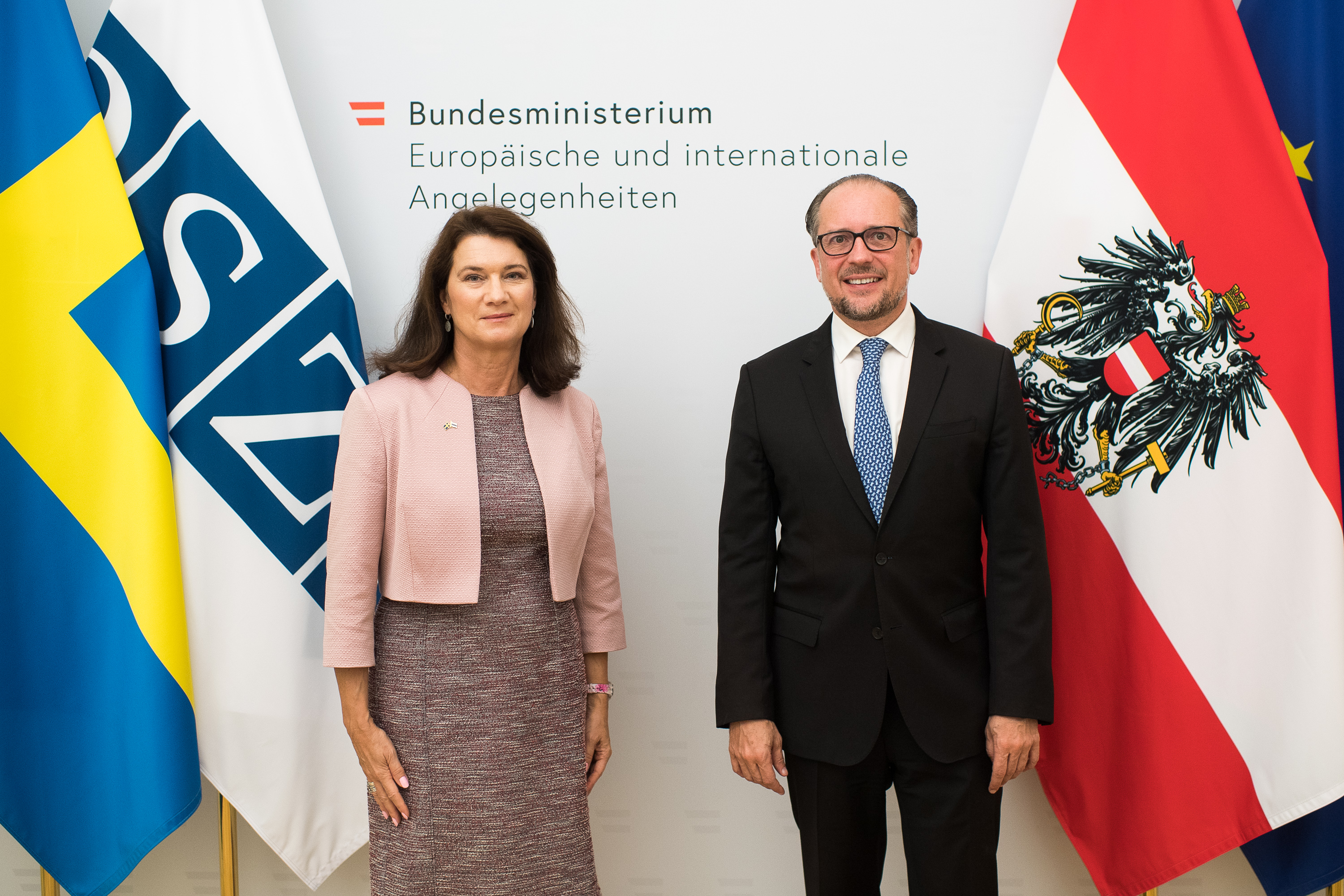
Linde with Austrian foreign minister Alexander Schallenberg on 31 August 2021

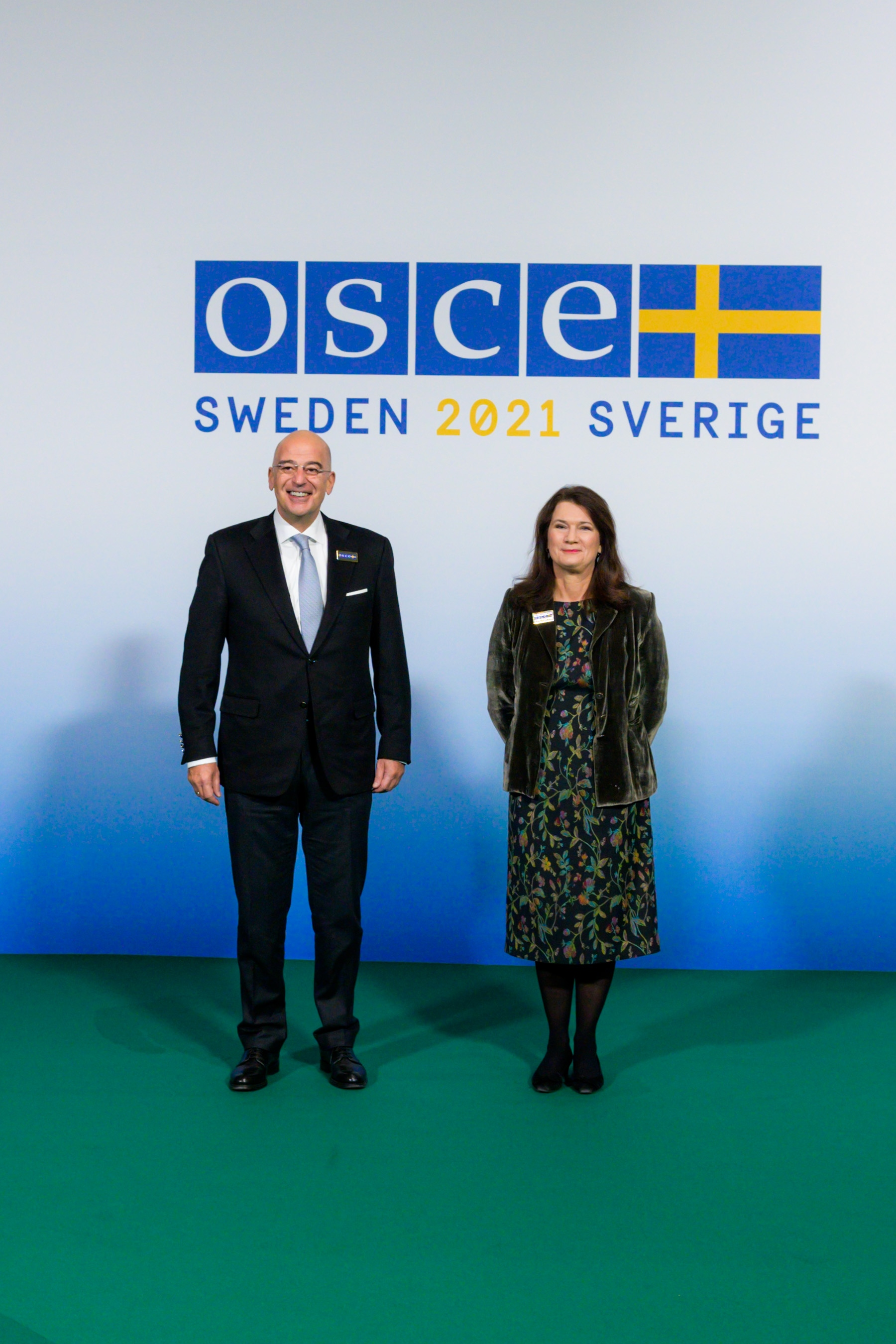
Linde with Greek foreign minister Nikos Dendias on 2 December 2021

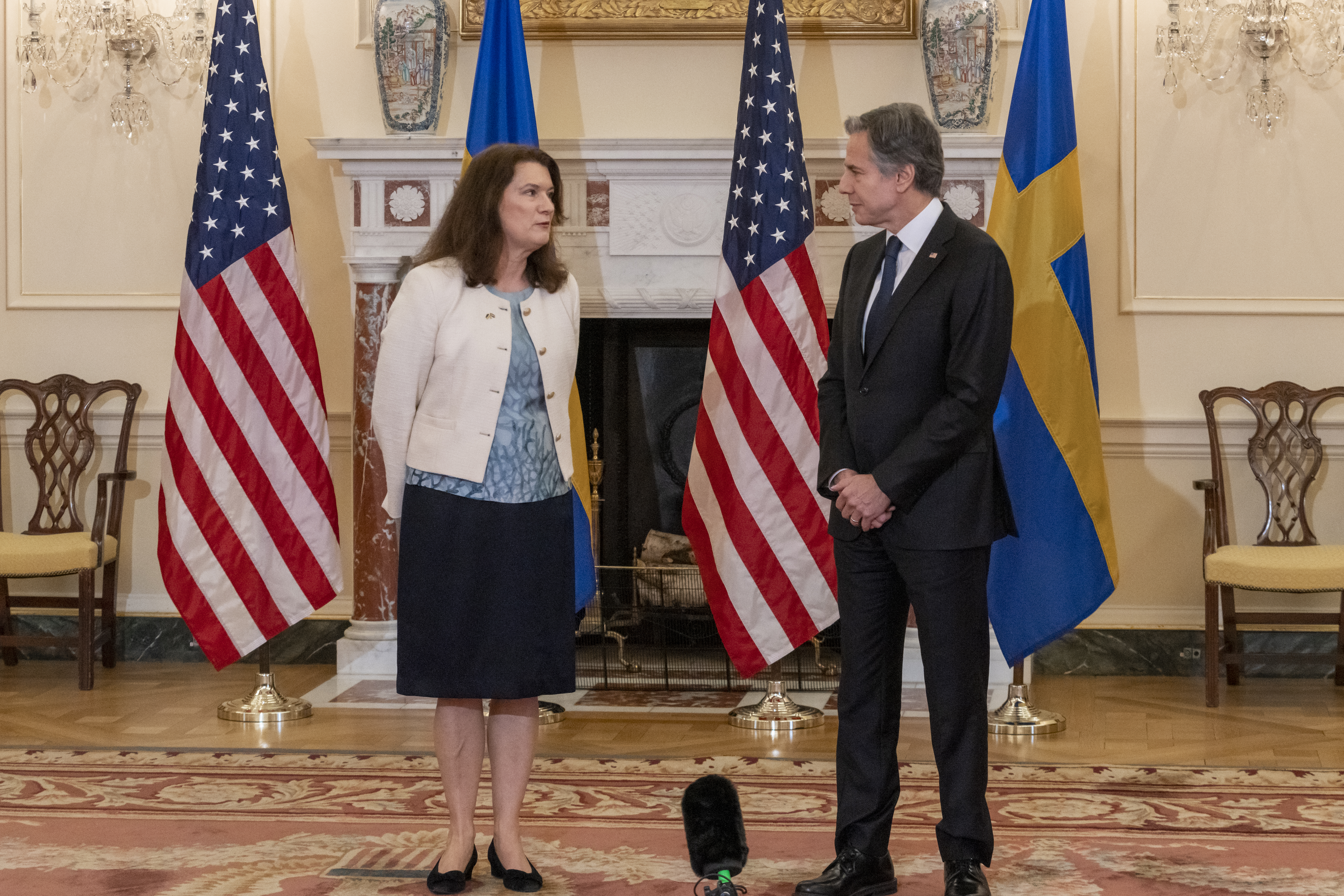
Linde with U.S. Secretary of State Antony Blinken in May 2022

Linde was appointed minister for foreign affairs following Margot Wallström's resignation on 10 September 2019.

Under Linde's leadership, Sweden's government decided in March 2020 to send a rapid reaction force of up to 150 troops and helicopters to Mali to join French-led Takuba task force in fighting militants linked to al Qaeda and Islamic State in the Sahel region of North Africa. By early 2022, Linde announced that Sweden would withdraw troops from a European special forces mission to the Sahel region and will review its participation in the Takuba task force over the presence of private Russian military contractors.

When Sweden took over the rotating Chair of the Organization for Security and Co-operation in Europe (OSCE) in 2021, Linde became the organization's Chairperson-in-Office.

=== Accession of Sweden to NATO ===
On 1 May 2022, she expressed that it was "almost certain" that Finland would join NATO. While most current NATO members responded positively to the application, Turkish president Recep Tayyip Erdoğan voiced his opposition, accusing both Sweden and Finland of tolerating Kurdish militant groups PKK, PYD and the YPG, which Turkey classifies as terrorist organizations, and followers of Fethullah Gülen, whom Turkey accuses of orchestrating a failed 2016 Turkish coup d'état attempt. On 20 May, Linde pushed back against Erdoğan's claim they support PKK, calling it "disinformation", and pointing out Sweden listed PKK as a terrorist organization in 1984, while the EU followed suit in 2002.

On 29 July, Linde announced that the ministry of foreign affairs would call in the Russian ambassador to explain himself in the wake of him mocking a Swedish volunteer soldier who died in a grenade attack in the Donbas region in Ukraine. She called his words "reprehensible and tasteless", with her full statement saying: "The text his reprehensible and tasteless. The ambassador doesn't mention at all that it was Russia who started the war, but only Russia can stop it".

== Political positions ==
When a parliamentary majority in favour of Sweden expressing the option of joining NATO emerged in 2020, Linde rejected such plans and reiterated her conviction that the country was best served by independence from alliances.

== Controversies ==
=== Headscarf controversy ===
Linde attracted criticism for wearing a headscarf during a visit by a government delegation to Tehran in 2017 when she met president Hassan Rouhani.

=== Transport Agency security breaches ===
Being State Secretary at the Ministry of Justice, Linde was one of the first politicians in the Government Offices who received information from the Security Department that there was a potential leak of sensitive information from the Transport Agency. The agency had outsourced parts of its IT services, including a data base with information about holders of driving licences, as well as about the Swedish road infrastructure.

=== Islamic revolution celebration ===
As Minister of Foreign Trade, Linde took part in the celebration of the 40th anniversary of the Islamic Revolution in Iran. Linde's participation was criticized by Iranian community organizations in Sweden, who argued that Linde's participation in the celebration was an insult to all Iranians living in Sweden who had to flee the Islamic regime.

== Other activities ==
- European Council on Foreign Relations (ECFR), Member
- Anna Lindh Memorial Fund, Member of the Board of Directors (since 2016)
- Olof Palme International Center, Member of the Board (2001–2013)
- Joint Committee of the Nordic Social Democratic Labour Movement (SAMAK), Member of the Working Group on Foreign Affairs and Security Policy (2001–2013)

== Honours ==
=== Recognition ===
- 2011 – "Friend of Palestine of the Year", awarded by a Palestinian community organization in Sweden (Palestinska föreningen)

=== Foreign honours ===
- Finland: Grand Cross of the Order of the Lion of Finland (17 May 2022)
- Spain: Grand Cross of the Order of Isabella the Catholic (16 November 2021)
- Netherlands: Knight Grand Cross of the Order of Orange-Nassau (11 October 2022)
- Germany: Grand Cross 1st class of the Order of Merit of the Federal Republic of Germany (7 September 2021)

== Personal life ==
Since 1989, Linde has been married to Mats Eriksson. She has two children.

Political offices
Vacant Title last held by Birgitta Ohlsson	Minister for European Union Affairs; 2016–2019	Succeeded by Hans Dahlgren
Preceded by Mikael Damberg	Minister of Foreign Trade; 2016–2019	Succeeded by Anna Hallberg
Preceded by Margot Wallström	Minister for Nordic Cooperation; 2019	Succeeded by Anna Hallberg
Preceded by Margot Wallström	Minister for Foreign Affairs; 2019–2022	Succeeded by Tobias Billström
