= Björn Rosengren (politician) =

Swedish politician (born 1942)

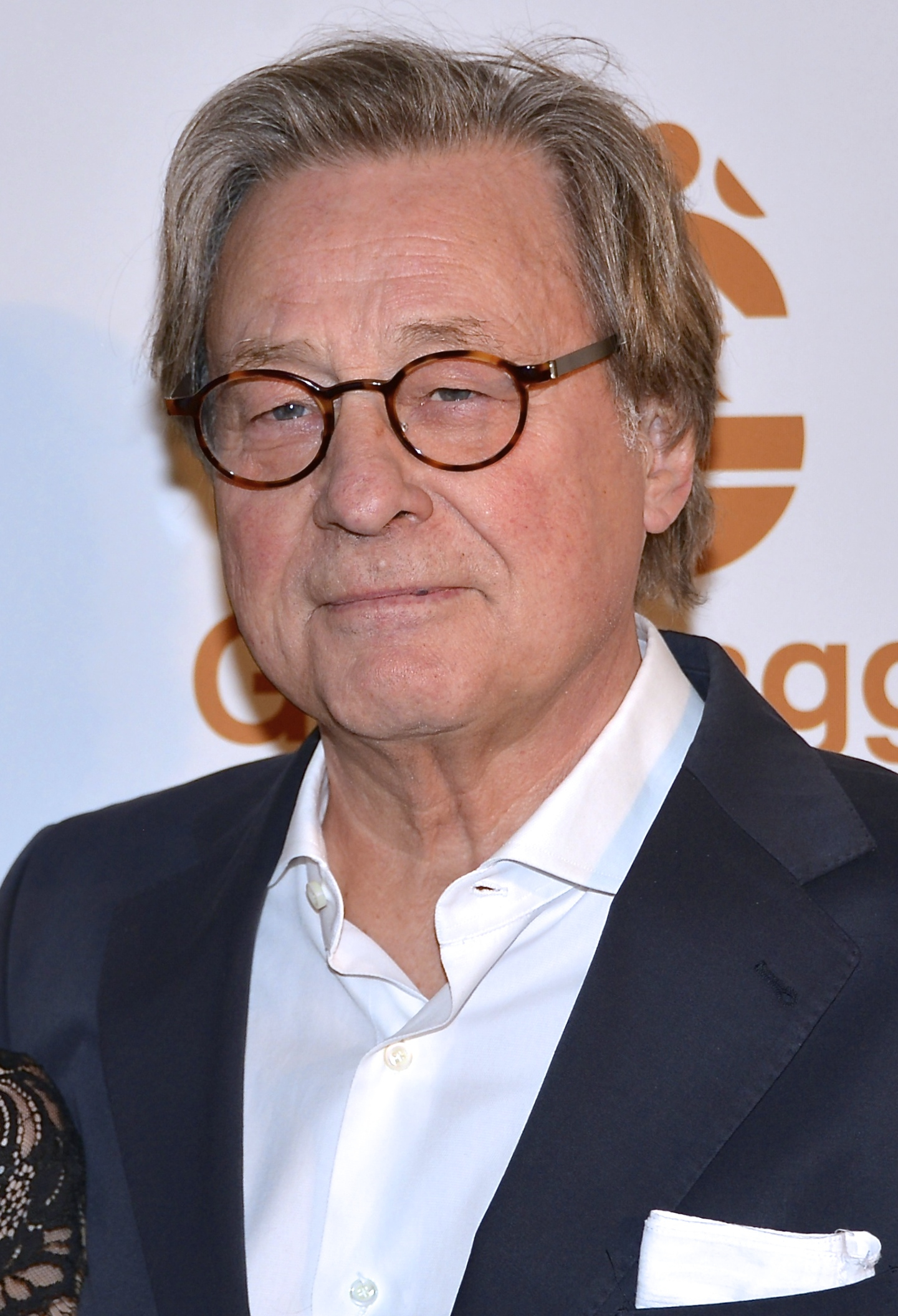
- Björn Rosengren at the Guldbaggen Award in January 2013
- Born: 14 April 1942 (age 84); Täby, Sweden
- Occupation: politician

Björn Folke Rosengren (born 14 April 1942) is a Swedish politician and advisor to the Stenbeck family.

== Life and career ==
Rosengren was born in Täby. He was active in the labour union and as a Social Democratic politician. He served as chairman of the Swedish Municipal Employee Union ("Vision", formerly SKTF) from 1976 to 1982, and on the Federation of Public Employee Unions TCO 1982–1994. He served as county governor in the Norrbotten County from 1995 to 1998, as minister of enterprise from 1998 to 2002, and as a member of the parliament in 2002.

Rosengren resides at Arnöbergs country manor on Arnö in lake Mälaren. Rosengren has been controversial with his role as advisor to the Swedish Stenbeck family and very close ties with the Prime Minister Göran Persson. In a famous controversial statement, in connection with the proposed Telenor-Telia fusion in 1999, he called Norway the last Soviet-state.

Preceded by Ines Uusmann	Swedish Minister for Communications; 1998—2000	Succeeded by Ulrica Messing
Preceded by Anders Sundström	Swedish Minister for Enterprise; 1998—2002	Succeeded by Leif Pagrotsky
