= Kristina Persson =

Swedish politician (born 1945)

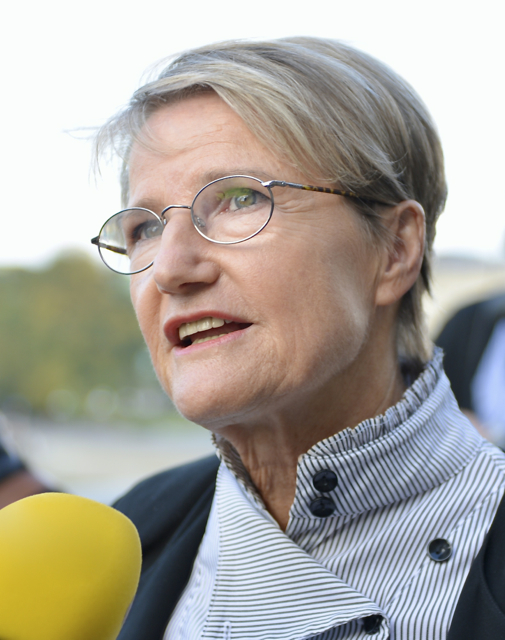

Minister for Nordic Cooperation
- In office 3 October 2014 – 25 May 2016
- Monarch: Carl XVI Gustaf
- Prime Minister: Stefan Löfven
- Preceded by: Ewa Björling
- Succeeded by: Margot Wallström

Minister for Strategic Development
- In office 3 October 2014 – 25 May 2016
- Monarch: Carl XVI Gustaf
- Prime Minister: Stefan Löfven
- Preceded by: Office created
- Succeeded by: Office abolished

Personal details
- Born: Inger Kristina Persson; 16 April 1945 (age 81) Östersund, Sweden
- Party: Social Democrats
- Occupation: Economist

Kristina Persson (born 16 April 1945) is a Swedish politician of the Social Democrats. She served as Minister for Nordic Cooperation and Minister for Strategic Development, under Prime Minister Stefan Löfven, from October 2014 to May 2016.

== Career ==
Persson started her career in the Ministry of Finance in 1971, moved to the Secretariat for Future Studies and then spent the 1980s in the trade union movement – first at the Swedish Trade Union Confederation (LO), then at the LO-TCO Secretariat of International Trade Union Development, later at the Council of Nordic Trade Unions (NFS) secretariat, and finally at the Swedish Confederation of Professional Employees (TCO). During the 1990s, she was an MP and then an MEP, before becoming a county governor and deputy governor of the Swedish central bank. From 2007 she led the think tank Global Challenge, which she had founded herself.

== Other activities ==
- European Policy Centre (EPC), Member of the Strategic Council
