= Anna Hallberg =

Swedish politician (born 1963)

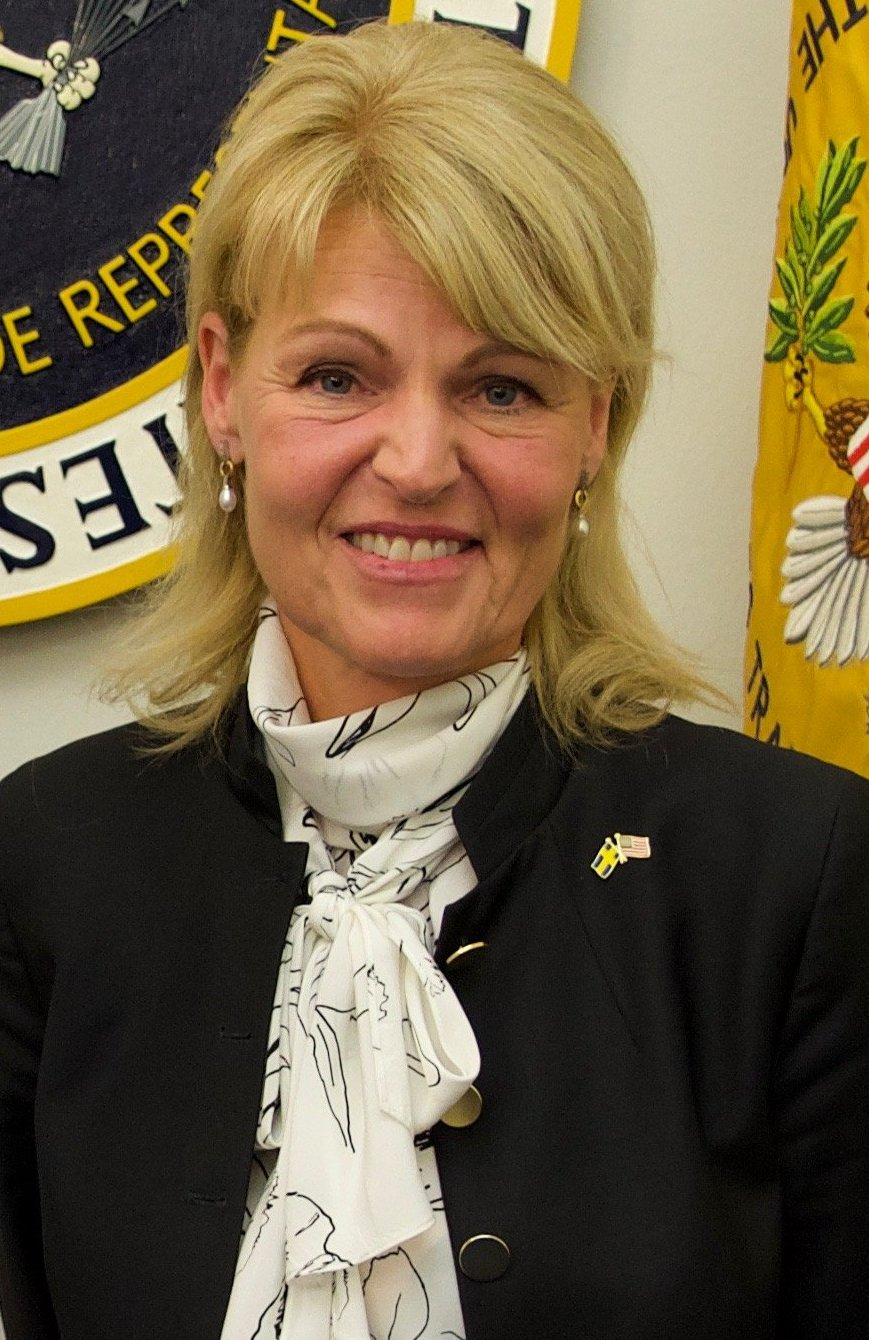
- Hallberg in 2019

Minister for Foreign Trade and Nordic Cooperation
- In office 10 September 2019 – 17 October 2022
- Monarch: Carl XVI Gustaf
- Prime Minister: Stefan Löfven; Magdalena Andersson
- Preceded by: Ann Linde
- Succeeded by: Johan Forssell (Foreign Trade); Jessika Roswall (Nordic Cooperation)

Personal details
- Born: 19 November 1963 (age 62) Gothenburg, Sweden
- Party: Social Democrats
- Domestic partner: Anders Sundström

Anna Kristina Elisabet Hallberg (née Eriksson; born 19 November 1963) is a Swedish politician for the Social Democrats. From 2019 to 2022, she served as the Minister of Foreign Trade and Minister for Nordic Cooperation.

She has previously been vice president of the state-owned enterprise Almi Företagspartner.

She is the domestic partner to Swedish politician and banker Anders Sundström.

Political offices
| Preceded by Ann Linde | Minister of Foreign Trade; 2019–2022 | Succeeded by Johan Forssell |
| Preceded by Ann Linde | Minister for Nordic Cooperation; 2019–2022 | Succeeded by Jessika Roswall |
