= Jessica Rosencrantz =

Swedish politician (born 1987)

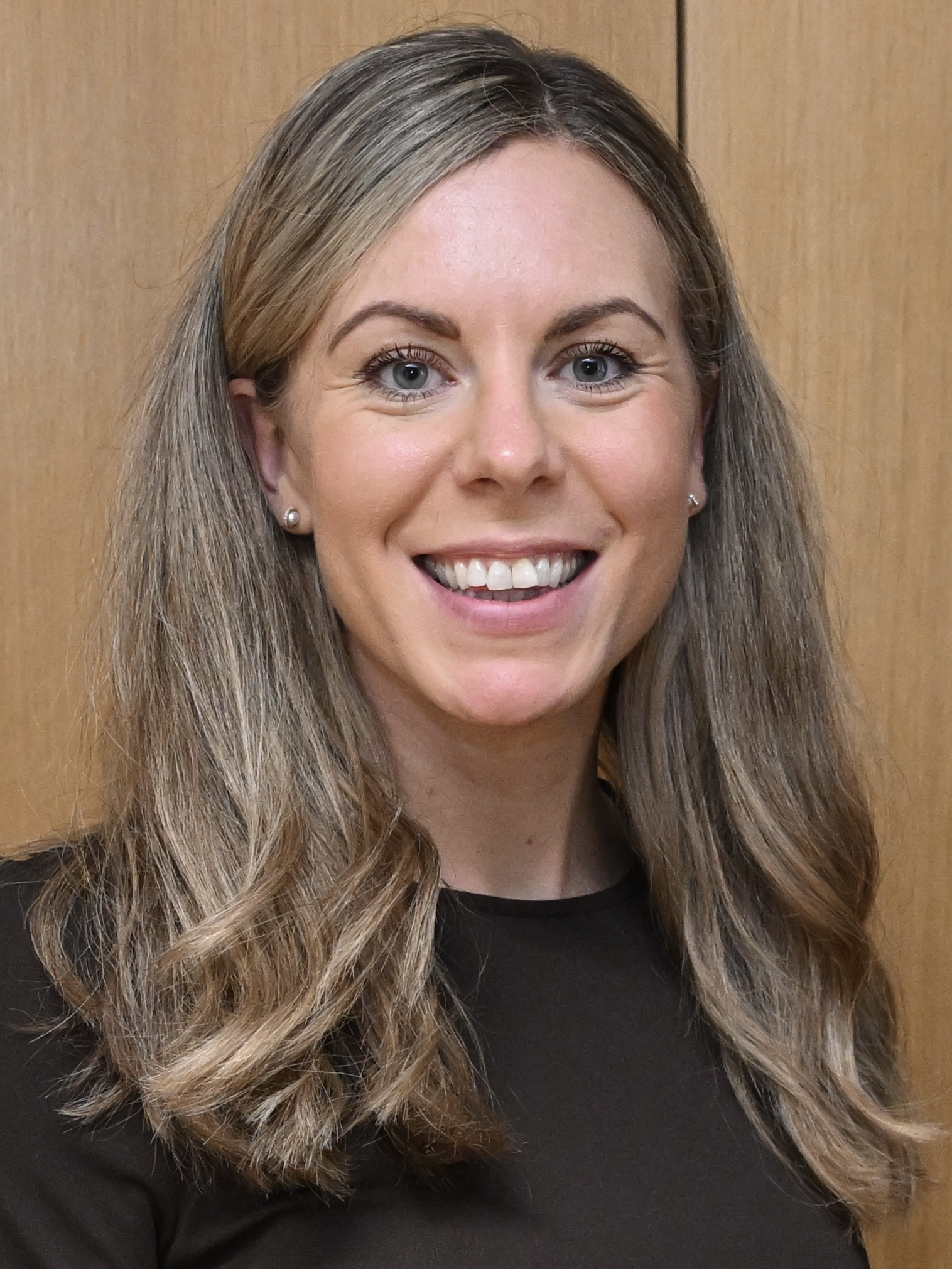
- Rosencrantz in 2024

Minister for European Union Affairs and Nordic Cooperation
- Incumbent
- Assumed office 10 September 2024
- Prime Minister: Ulf Kristersson
- Preceded by: Jessika Roswall

Member of the Riksdag
- Incumbent
- Assumed office 19 September 2010
- Constituency: Stockholm Municipality

Personal details
- Born: Jessica Emilia Marie Andersson; 6 October 1987 (age 38) Malmö, Sweden
- Party: Moderate Party
- Education: Stockholm School of Economics

Jessica Emilia Marie Rosencrantz (née Andersson; born 6 October 1987) is a Swedish politician (Moderate Party) and a Member of Parliament (Sveriges Riksdag) since 2010. She is the chair of the Parliament's EU Committee and deputy group leader in the Parliament for the Moderates, as well as a member of the Parliamentary Board. Since September 2024 she has been Minister for European Union Affairs and Nordic Cooperation in the Kristersson cabinet.

She holds a Master of Science in Economics from the Stockholm School of Economics, with a focus on economics.

== Parliamentary Assignments ==
Rosencrantz became a Member of Parliament in 2010, initially serving as an alternate member of the Committee on Finance and the Committee on Civil Affairs. Later, in 2013, she became a member of the Committee on Transport and Communications and an alternate member of the Committee on European Union Affairs.

Following the 2014 election, Rosencrantz became the transportation and IT policy spokesperson for the Moderate Party, whilst simultaneously progressing to the position of vice-chair of the Committee on Transport and Communication. In 2019, she transitioned to become the climate and environmental policy spokesperson for the Moderate Party, and was appointed as the second vice-chair of the Committee on Environment and Agriculture.

After the 2022 election, Rosencrantz became the chair of the Committee on Social Insurance, deputy group leader for the Moderate Party in Parliament, and a member of the Parliamentary Board. When Hans Wallmark left Parliament to become an ambassador to Denmark, Rosencrantz took over the position as chair of the Parliament's Committee on European Union Affairs, where she had been an alternate since 2012 and a member since 2019.

She was appointed Minister for EU Affairs on 10 September 2024 in a cabinet reshuffle.
