= Jessika Roswall =

Swedish politician (born 1972)

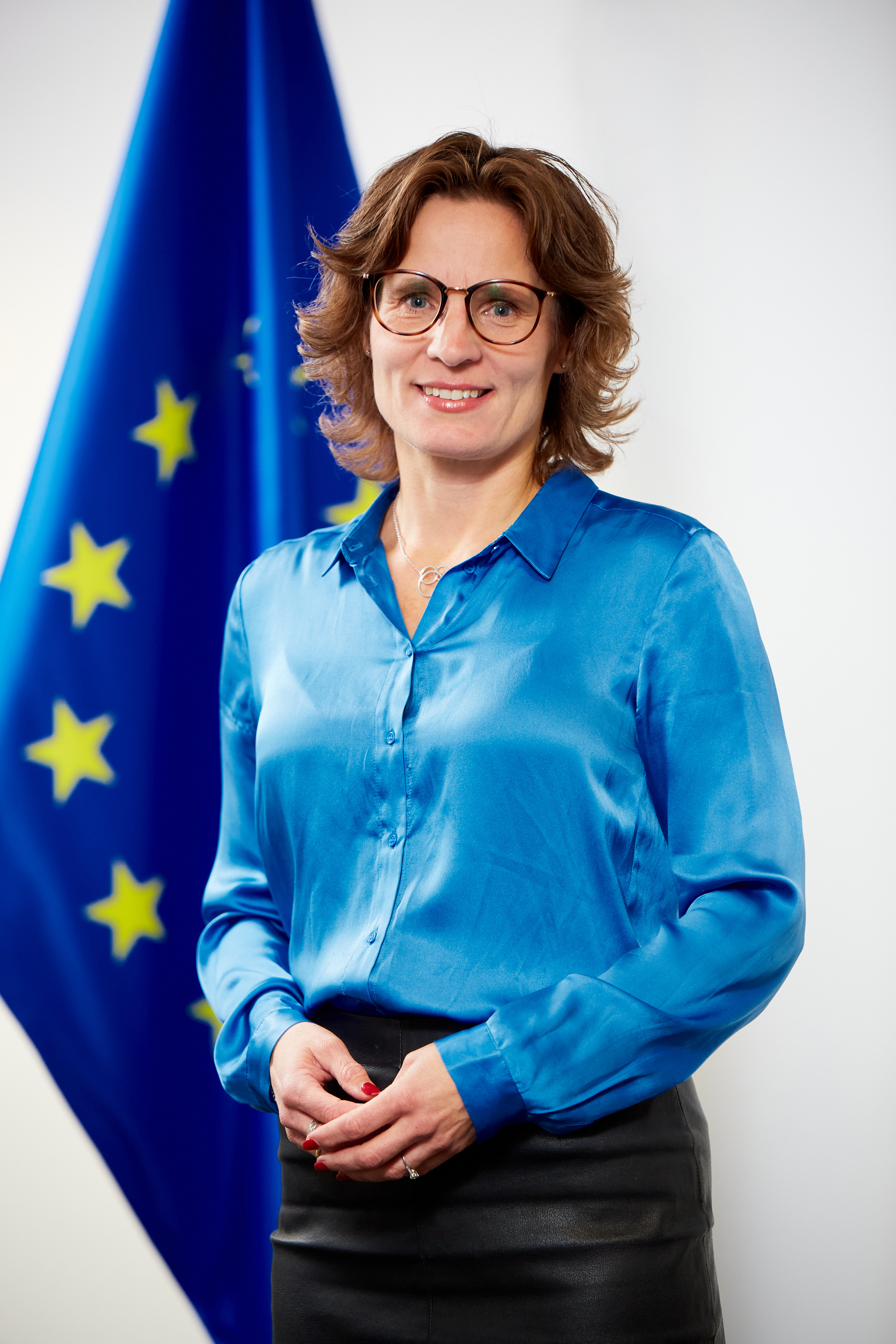
- Official portrait, 2024

European Commissioner for Environment, Water Resilience and a Competitive Circular Economy
- Incumbent
- Assumed office 1 December 2024
- Commission: Von der Leyen II
- Preceded by: Virginijus Sinkevičius

Minister for EU Affairs and Nordic Cooperation
- In office 18 October 2022 – 10 September 2024
- Monarch: Carl XVI Gustaf
- Prime Minister: Ulf Kristersson
- Preceded by: Hans Dahlgren (European Union Affairs); Anna Hallberg (Nordic Cooperation)
- Succeeded by: Jessica Rosencrantz

Member of the Riksdag
- In office 4 October 2010 – 29 August 2024
- Constituency: Uppsala County

Personal details
- Born: Jessika Elisabeth Vilhelmsson; 18 December 1972 (age 53) Uppsala, Sweden
- Party: Moderate Party
- Education: Uppsala University; Stockholm University

Jessika Roswall (born Vilhelmsson, 18 December 1972) is a Swedish politician of the Moderate Party. She serves as European Commissioner for Environment, Water Resilience and a Competitive Circular Economy and Swedish European Commissioner since 1 December 2024.

She served as Minister for European Union Affairs and Minister for Nordic Cooperation in the cabinet of Ulf Kristersson from 2022 to 2024. She was also a member of parliament from the 2010 general election to 2024, representing Uppsala County.

== Early life and education ==
Roswall is the daughter of lawyer Anders Roswall; her mother is a teacher. She graduated from high school in 1991 and studied history at Stockholm University in 1995–1997. She moved to Uppsala to study law at Uppsala University and graduated in law (LLM) in 2002.

== Career ==
After graduation, Roswall started working as a paralegal at the law firm Wigert & Placht. She then became a lawyer, specializing in criminal and family law.

At the same time, Roswall was a deputy in the municipal council of Enköping.

In the 2010 parliamentary election, Roswall was elected member of parliament for the Moderate Party. As a newly appointed member of parliament, she became a member of the tax committee. Since 2011, she has been a member of the Civil Affairs Committee, where she works with consumer policy issues, among other things. Since 2015, she has also been a member of the Swedish Consumer Agency's transparency council. She became her party's spokesperson on EU relations in 2019.

From 18 October 2022, Roswall served as Minister for EU Affairs and for Nordic Cooperation in the Kristersson Cabinet.

Following the 2024 European elections, the Swedish government nominated Roswall as the country's European Commissioner, on 8 August 2024, serving under President Ursula von der Leyen.

Political offices
Preceded by Hans Dahlgren	Minister for European Union Affairs; 2022–2024	Succeeded by Jessica Rosencrantz
Preceded by Anna Hallberg	Minister for Nordic Cooperation; 2022–2024	Succeeded by Jessica Rosencrantz
Preceded by Ylva Johansson	Swedish European Commissioner; 2024–	Incumbent
Preceded by Virginijus Sinkevičius	European Commissioner for Environment, Water Resilience and a Competitive Circular Economy; 2024–	Incumbent
