= Carl B. Hamilton =

Swedish politician (born 1946)

Count Carl B. Hamilton
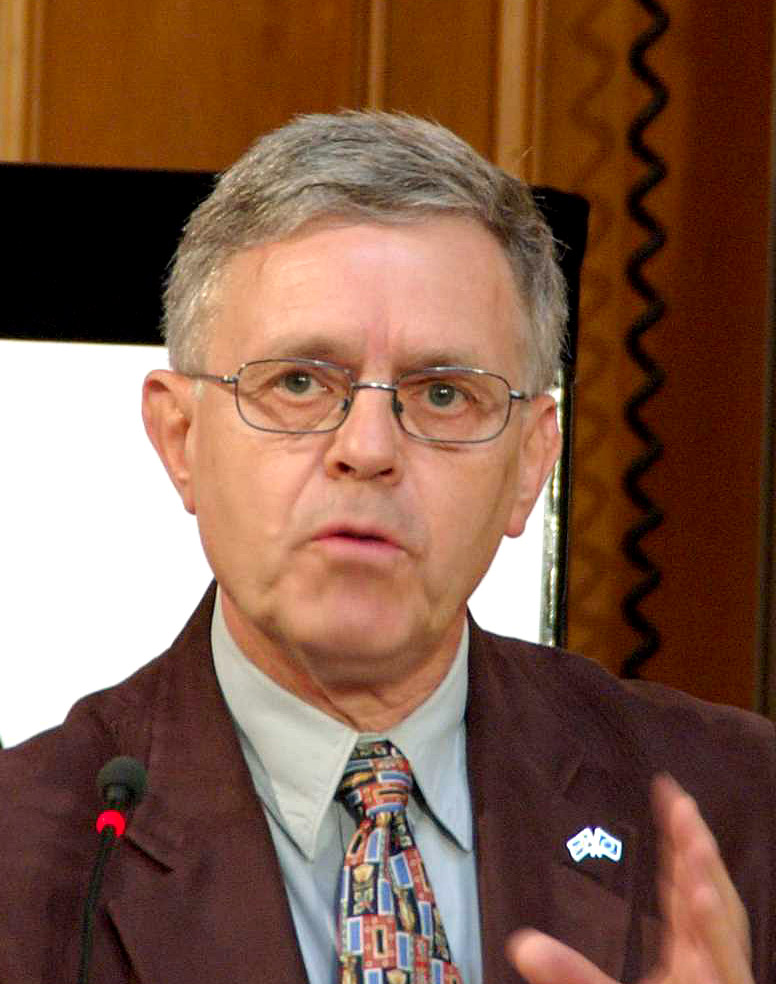
- Count Carl B. Hamilton in 2011.

Member of the Riksdag for Stockholm Municipality
- In office 1991–1993
- In office 1994–1994
- In office 1997–1998
- In office 2002–2014

Personal details
- Born: Carl Peter Bastiat Hamilton; January 1, 1946 (age 80) Gothenburg, Sweden
- Party: Liberals

Count Carl Peter Bastiat Hamilton (born 1 January 1946 in Gothenburg) is a Swedish count, economist and politician.

He has been a Member of Parliament for the Liberal People's Party from 1997 to 1998, and again since 2002. He sits in the parliament's Committee on the Labour Market and is vice-chair of the Committee on EU Affairs. He is also a member of the party board of the Liberal People's Party.

From 1993 to 1994 he served as an Undersecretary of State at the Swedish Ministry of Finance.

Hamilton holds a doctorate in economics from London in 1974. From 1992 to 1997 he served as a professor in economics at the Stockholm University. During the mid '90s he worked as chief economist at Handelsbanken. He has been a part-time professor in international economics at the Stockholm School of Economics since 1999.
