= Löfven Cabinet =

Löfven Cabinet may refer to:

- Löfven I Cabinet, the first cabinet of Stefan Löfven (2014–2019)
- Löfven II Cabinet, the second cabinet of Stefan Löfven (2019–2021)
- Löfven III Cabinet, the third cabinet of Stefan Löfven (2021)
