= Löfven II cabinet =

2019–2021 Swedish government cabinet

Stefan Löfven's second cabinet
- 54th Cabinet of Sweden

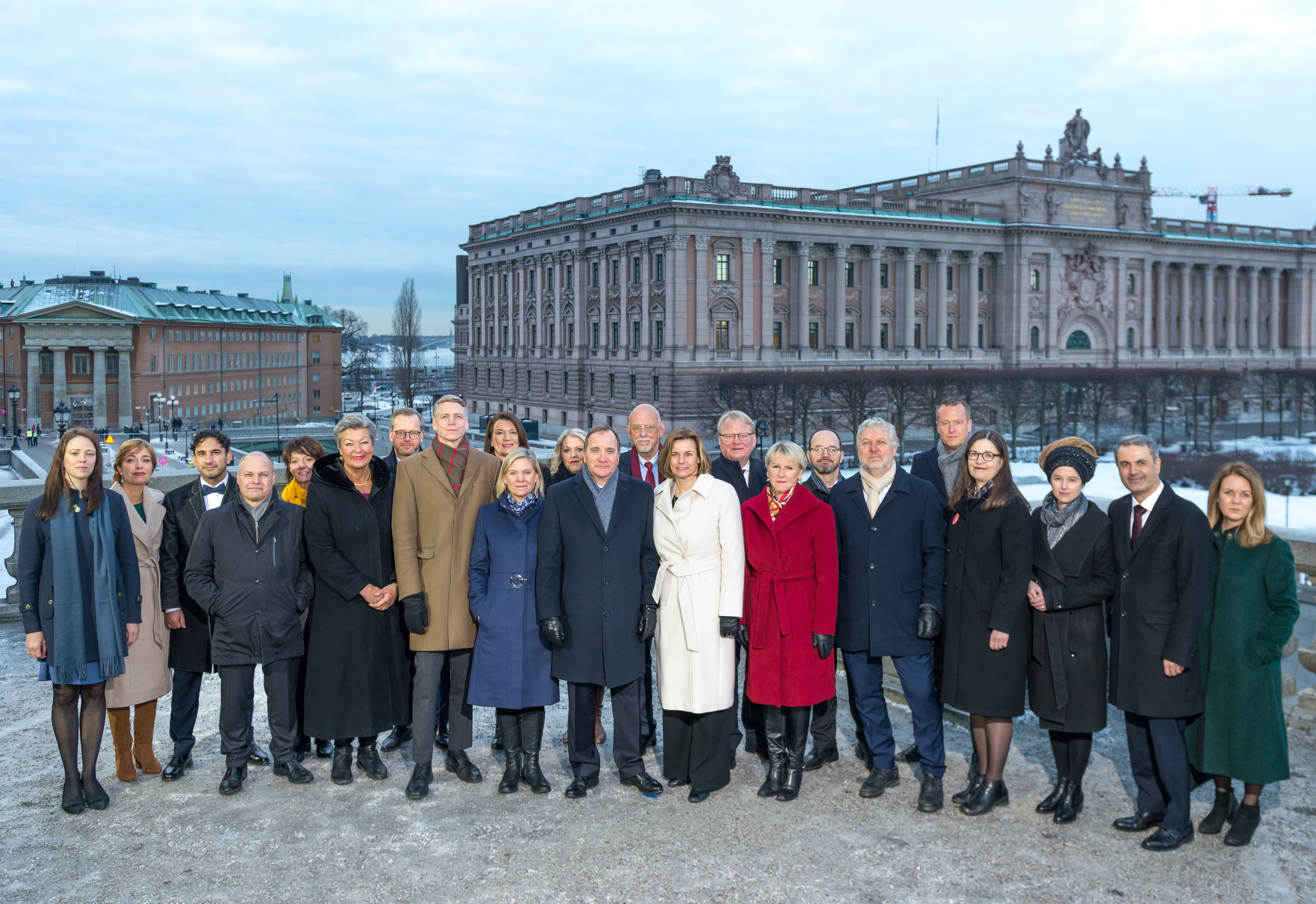
- The Löfven II cabinet outside the Stockholm Royal Palace, January 2019
- Date formed: 21 January 2019
- Date dissolved: 9 July 2021

People and organisations
- Head of state: Carl XVI Gustaf
- Head of government: Stefan Löfven
- Deputy head of government: Isabella Lövin (MP; de jure; 2019–2021) (Note: Prime Minister Löfven did not appoint a deputy prime minister in accordance with 8 § Chapter 6 of the Instrument of Government. Thus, the de facto deputy prime minister defaulted to the longest-serving member of the cabinet, Margot Wallström and later Morgan Johansson. Lövin's and later Bolund's title vice statsminister was ceremonial.); Per Bolund (MP; de jure; 2021); Margot Wallström (S; de facto; 2019); Morgan Johansson (S; de facto; 2019–2021)
- No. of ministers: 22
- Member parties: Social Democrats; Green Party
- Status in legislature: Coalition minority with confidence and supply from Centre Party and Liberals (Note: The Liberals supported the Löfven II cabinet until this government lost a vote of no-confidence 21 June 2021. Claiming the January Agreement, which built the foundation for Löfven's governance, was dissolved after the vote, the party revoked their support.)
- Opposition parties: Moderate Party; Sweden Democrats; Left Party; Christian Democrats
- Opposition leader: Ulf Kristersson (M)

History
- Incoming formation: 2018 election Motion of no confidence
- Outgoing formation: Motion of no confidence
- Election: 2018 election
- Legislature terms: 2018–2022
- Predecessor: Löfven I cabinet
- Successor: Löfven III cabinet

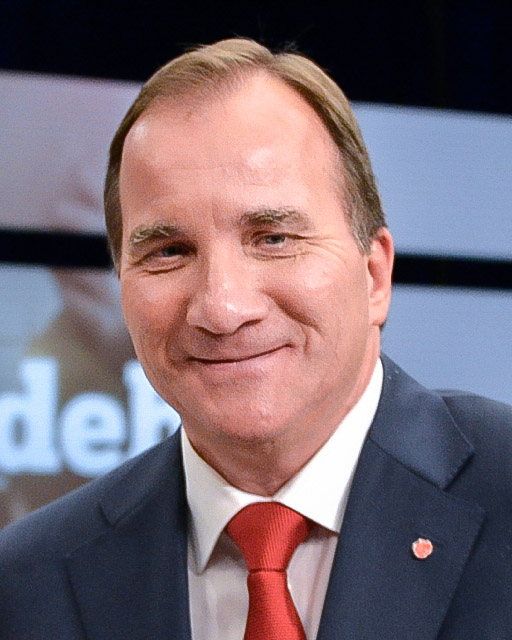
Prime Minister Stefan Löfven.

The Löfven II cabinet (Swedish: regeringen Löfven II) was the government of Sweden from 21 January 2019 to 9 July 2021. It was a coalition minority government between the Social Democrats and the Green Party, with confidence and supply from the Centre Party and the Liberals, led by Prime Minister Stefan Löfven of the Social Democrats. The cabinet was installed following the 2018 general election, after a Swedish record-long government formation.

The cabinet was installed after a formal government meeting with King Carl XVI Gustaf on 21 January 2019. Stefan Löfven had previously announced his cabinet ministers at a parliament session. In a vote of no-confidence held on 21 June 2021, Löfven was voted out of office. The cabinet continued as a caretaker government until a new cabinet was appointed. On 9 July, the Löfven III cabinet was installed.

With only a total of 32.7 percent of the popular votes in 2018 and 116 out of 349 seats (33%) in the Riksdag (Swedish parliament), the "red-green" coalition began as one of the smallest minority governments in Swedish history and relied on support from other parties in the Riksdag.

== Ministers ==
Portfolio	Minister	Took office	Left office	Party
Prime Minister's Office
Prime Minister	Stefan Löfven	21 January 2019	9 July 2021	Social Democrats
Deputy Prime Minister not a separate minister post	Margot Wallström (de facto)	21 January 2019	10 September 2019	Social Democrats
Deputy Prime Minister not a separate minister post	Morgan Johansson (de facto)	10 September 2019	9 July 2021	Social Democrats
Deputy Prime Minister not a separate minister post	Isabella Lövin (de jure)	21 January 2019	5 February 2021	Green
Deputy Prime Minister not a separate minister post	Per Bolund (de jure)	5 February 2021	9 July 2021	Green
Minister for EU Affairs	Hans Dahlgren	21 January 2019	9 July 2021	Social Democrats
Ministry of Justice
Minister for Justice; Minister for Migration	Morgan Johansson	21 January 2019	9 July 2021	Social Democrats
Minister of the Interior	Mikael Damberg	21 January 2019	9 July 2021	Social Democrats
Ministry of Foreign Affairs
Minister for Foreign Affairs	Margot Wallström	21 January 2019	10 September 2019	Social Democrats
Minister for Foreign Affairs	Ann Linde	10 September 2019	9 July 2021	Social Democrats
Minister of Foreign Trade; Minister for Nordic Cooperation	Ann Linde	21 January 2019	10 September 2019	Social Democrats
Minister of Foreign Trade; Minister for Nordic Cooperation	Anna Hallberg	10 September 2019	9 July 2021	Social Democrats
Minister for International Development Cooperation	Peter Eriksson	21 January 2019	17 December 2020	Green
Minister for International Development Cooperation	Isabella Lövin (acting)	17 December 2020	5 February 2021	Green
Minister for International Development Cooperation	Per Olsson Fridh	5 February 2021	9 July 2021	Green
Ministry of Defence
Minister for Defence	Peter Hultqvist	21 January 2019	9 July 2021	Social Democrats
Ministry of Health and Social Affairs
Minister for Health and Social Affairs	Lena Hallengren	21 January 2019	9 July 2021	Social Democrats
Minister for Social Security	Annika Strandhäll	21 January 2019	1 October 2019	Social Democrats
Minister for Social Security	Ardalan Shekarabi	1 October 2019	9 July 2021	Social Democrats
Ministry of Finance
Minister for Finance	Magdalena Andersson	21 January 2019	9 July 2021	Social Democrats
Minister for Financial Markets; Minister for Housing; Deputy Minister for Finance	Per Bolund	21 January 2019	5 February 2021	Green
Minister for Financial Markets; Deputy Minister for Finance	Åsa Lindhagen	5 February 2021	9 July 2021	Green
Minister for Public Administration; Minister for Consumer Affairs	Ardalan Shekarabi	21 January 2019	1 October 2019	Social Democrats
Minister for Public Administration; Minister for Consumer Affairs	Lena Micko	1 October 2019	9 July 2021	Social Democrats
Ministry of Education and Research
Minister for Education	Anna Ekström	21 January 2019	9 July 2021	Social Democrats
Minister for Higher Education and Research	Matilda Ernkrans	21 January 2019	9 July 2021	Social Democrats
Ministry of the Environment
Minister for the Environment; Minister for the Climate	Isabella Lövin	21 January 2019	5 February 2021	Green
Minister for the Environment; Minister for the Climate	Per Bolund	5 February 2021	9 July 2021	Green
Ministry of Enterprise and Innovation
Minister for Enterprise	Ibrahim Baylan	21 January 2019	9 July 2021	Social Democrats
Minister for Rural Affairs	Jennie Nilsson	21 January 2019	30 June 2021	Social Democrats
Ministry of Culture
Minister for Culture; Minister for Democracy; Minister for Sports	Amanda Lind	21 January 2019	9 July 2021	Green
Ministry of Employment
Minister for Employment	Ylva Johansson	21 January 2019	10 September 2019	Social Democrats
Minister for Employment	Eva Nordmark	10 September 2019	9 July 2021	Social Democrats
Minister for Gender Equality; Minister with responsibility for anti-discrimination and anti-segregation	Åsa Lindhagen	21 January 2019	5 February 2021	Green
Minister for Gender Equality; Minister for Housing; Minister with responsibility for anti-discrimination and anti-segregation	Märta Stenevi	5 February 2021	9 July 2021	Green
Ministry of Infrastructure
Minister for Infrastructure	Tomas Eneroth	21 January 2019	9 July 2021	Social Democrats
Minister for Energy; Minister for Digital Development	Anders Ygeman	21 January 2019	9 July 2021	Social Democrats

== Policy ==
=== January Agreement ===
The cabinet was one of the weakest governments in Swedish history. Thus, it relied on support from other parties in the Riksdag. Holding only 33% of seats in parliament, this red-green government's retention of power was the result of a joint agreement between the Social Democrats, the Green Party, the Centre Party and the Liberals. The 16-page document known as the January Agreement (Januariavtalet), as it was signed in January 2019, dictated government policy during this time.

The agreement included the following main points:

- The Centre Party and Liberals agreed to abstain from voting against Stefan Löfven's re-election.
- The Left Party were to not receive any influence over Swedish politics for the following years.
- Passing a test in Swedish and in the basics of civics were to be made mandatory to acquire Swedish citizenship.
- The abolition of the värnskatt tax by 2020. This tax, which was adopted in 1995 by the Social Democrats, was a surtax of five additional percentage points on anyone's annual income that exceeds SEK 703,000.
- The reform of the Employment Protection Act (LAS) by 2021. The amendments included additional exceptions to the rules of seniority regarding redundancy terminations of employees.
- The government was to refrain from proposing legislation which would limit or prevent the private sector from generating profits from their work in the welfare system.
- Taxes on environmentally unfriendly goods and services were to be increased while taxes on salaries were to be lowered. This is known as grön skatteväxling (lit. 'green tax shifting') in Swedish politics and amounted to SEK 15 billion (circa €1.38 billion).
- The lowering of taxes for retirees by 2020 and an increase in general pensions by 2021.
- The introduction of the "family week". Working parents who have children between the ages of four and sixteen receive three days off each within the framework of parental insurance. These days are intended to be used when children cannot attend school due to school breaks, etc. Single parents receive six days.
- The expansion of the tax reduction on household services (RUT deductions) to include an additional range of services.
- Lowered employers' state fees.
- A reformed Public Employment Service, having it compete with private employment services.

Additionally, the agreement included investments and policy changes across many areas:

==== Infrastructure ====
- Investments into the countryside, such as increased possibilities for distance education. The government was to ensure that no more government services locate their headquarters in the capital, Stockholm, during the government term.
- Improvements to digital infrastructure, with the goal being to guarantee that 95% of all households and businesses has access to a broadband speed of at least 100 Mbit/s by 2020.
- Investments in the railway and road infrastructure across the country amounting to SEK 700 billion (c. €65.2 billion) between 2018 and 2029.
- Tasking the Swedish Transport Administration with maintaining daily over-night trains to several European cities.

==== Environment ====
- The prohibition of the sale of new gasoline- and diesel-driven cars.
- The reintroduction of the aviation tax.

==== Social integration ====
- Making the punishment for honor-related violent crimes more severe.
- Allowing municipalities to limit state aid to those asylum seekers who manage to find their own housing in areas with socio-economic difficulties.

==== Housing ====
- The liberalization of rent controls on newly constructed housing developments.
- The abolition of four separate taxes which are collectively known as the flyttskatt ('move tax').

==== Education ====
- Permitting academic grading from year 4 (age 10) of elementary school, instead of year 6, but making it voluntary for schools to grade students up until year 6.
- Prohibiting further religiously oriented privately owned schools from opening.
- Exploring the possibilities for a state-run education system.

==== Personal assistance ====
- The restoration of the right to receive a subsidy for assistance for care revolving around breathing and tube feeding, which was abolished in the Moderate and Christian Democrat budget. (Note: During the lengthy government formation process of 2018–2019, the right-wing opposition's budget was adopted for the fiscal year of 2019.)

==== Security ====
- 10,000 more police employees by 2024.
- The prohibition of weapon export deals with non-democratic countries which are known to participate militarily in the Yemeni conflict until the conflict ends.

The government proposed to reduce employers’ social security contributions to increase young people's employment in 2019. The Swedish fossil-free initiatives proposals amounted to SEK 1,950 million, including investments in biogas and home charging of SEK 750 million, wetland protection at 200 million, and solar cell subsidies of 300 million. Aviation tax of SEK 785 million a year is to be collected.

=== 2020 state budget ===
Minister for Finance Magdalena Andersson delivered the 2020 budget proposal to the Riksdag on 18 September 2019. The reforms of the budget were in accordance with the January agreement and were estimated to cost the state 30 billion crowns.

Arguably the most significant reform in the budget proposal was the abolished värnskatt tax. The värnskatt was a surtax which was adopted in 1995 by the Social Democratic Carlsson Cabinet. It taxed five additional percentage points on anyone's annual income that exceeds 703,000 crowns. The reform had been pushed by the Liberals for a long time.

The largest reform in terms of increasing revenue in the budget was the three-crown tax on plastic bags which was expected to generate 2 billion crowns in tax revenue.

Other tax-political reforms included the lowering of taxes for the elderly with a pension of at least SEK 17,000 per month, as well as a tax break for people living in certain rural municipalities. The eligible municipalities cover most of Norrland and Dalarna and parts of Värmland and Dalsland.

The regions and municipalities of Sweden received a general contribution of SEK 5 billion. The municipalities received SEK 3.5 billion and the regions received SEK 1.5 billion. The funds were to be distributed equally in proportion to each subdivision's population. An additional 410 million crowns were allocated towards combatting and preventing segregation on the local and regional levels, with a reserve fund of 85 million made available for the same purpose.

According to Dagens Nyheter, 110 of Sweden's municipalities would be operating at a deficit during the second half of 2019.

The government claimed that the reforms would increase the gap between the poor and the rich, as well as between men and women.

=== Measures against gang crime ===
In September 2019, talks were held between the government parties and the centre-right Moderates, Christian Democrats, Centre Party and Liberals regarding an agreement concerning measures for combating gang violence and organized crime. Negotiations broke down on 21 September 2019, with three of the centre-right parties (M, L and KD) leaving the talks. The Moderate spokesman for justice affairs stated that "We can agree to a lot of the crime prevention work [proposals]. Regarding the strengthening of justice policy, I can affirm that we are still very far from each other". The Moderates demanded additional police officers, the doubling of prison time for gang-related offences, the ability to turn state's evidence and the abolition of mandatory lenient sentencing for young offenders. The Christian Democrats, Centre Party and Liberals pushed for the ability of witnesses to testify on the condition of anonymity.

On the same day, following the breakdown of the negotiations, the government announced their own package of measures to combat gang crime. The package consisted of 34 proposals which included giving the police the ability to read and listen to encrypted communications, transferring certain police responsibilities to community service officers and increasing the mandatory minimum sentences for several crimes such as weapons and explosives offences, recruiting youth for criminal activities and for conveying narcotics to others. Moderate leader Ulf Kristersson announced on 22 September that they would support the government package, provided that the proposals lead to concrete reforms. The Christian Democrats stated that they would support certain parts of the package.

Following the shooting of a 15-year-old boy in Malmö on the night of 9 November, the opposition parties called for a vote of no-confidence against Minister of Justice Morgan Johansson, deeming him at least partly responsible for the recent wave of violent crime. Two days later, on 11 November, the police launched Operation Rimfrost with the mission of curbing gang violence, with police officials claiming that a "difference would be noticed" within roughly six months. The vote of no-confidence against the Minister of Justice was held on 13 November and failed, accruing only 131 of the 175 'yes' votes required.

=== Response to Covid-19 outbreak ===
On 24 February, the government announced that they would be spending SEK 40 million (roughly €4 million) towards the World Health Organization's efforts in containing the 2019–20 coronavirus outbreak. Public gatherings of more than 500 people were banned on 11 March. A set of emergency reforms were announced on 16 March to curb the economic effects of the coronavirus. The state will provide all employees with paid sickness leave and will also give companies more time to pay taxes. The reform package has a capped budget of SEK 300 billion. On 17 March, schools providing secondary and higher education (gymnasium and universities) were advised to close and to teach classes remotely. In conjunction with the European Union announcing a 30-day travel ban for people entering the Union, the government instituted a ban on non-essential travel from non-EU nations to Sweden in the evening of 17 March.

=== Employment Protection Act (LAS) talks ===
Negotiations between the Swedish Trade Union Confederation and the Confederation of Swedish Enterprise regarding the reform of the Employment Protection Act (Lagen om anställningsskydd, LAS) failed on 1 October 2020. As the reform of LAS was stipulated to occur by no later than 2022, (Note: The government inquiry extends the time limit stipulated in the January Agreement from 2021 to 2022) unless negotiations were resumed, the government was expected to step in and execute the reforms put forward in their 2019 inquiry. The Left Party was firmly against the suggested reforms and vowed to launch a vote of no-confidence against the government if they were to go through with the reforms. The right-wing opposition parties, wishing to oust the government, indicated that they would support the Left during such a vote, which would be enough for a majority. Trade union and enterprise leaders resumed talks on 14 October and presented a batch of proposed reforms to the government in December 2020.

== Controversies ==
=== Begler Affair ===
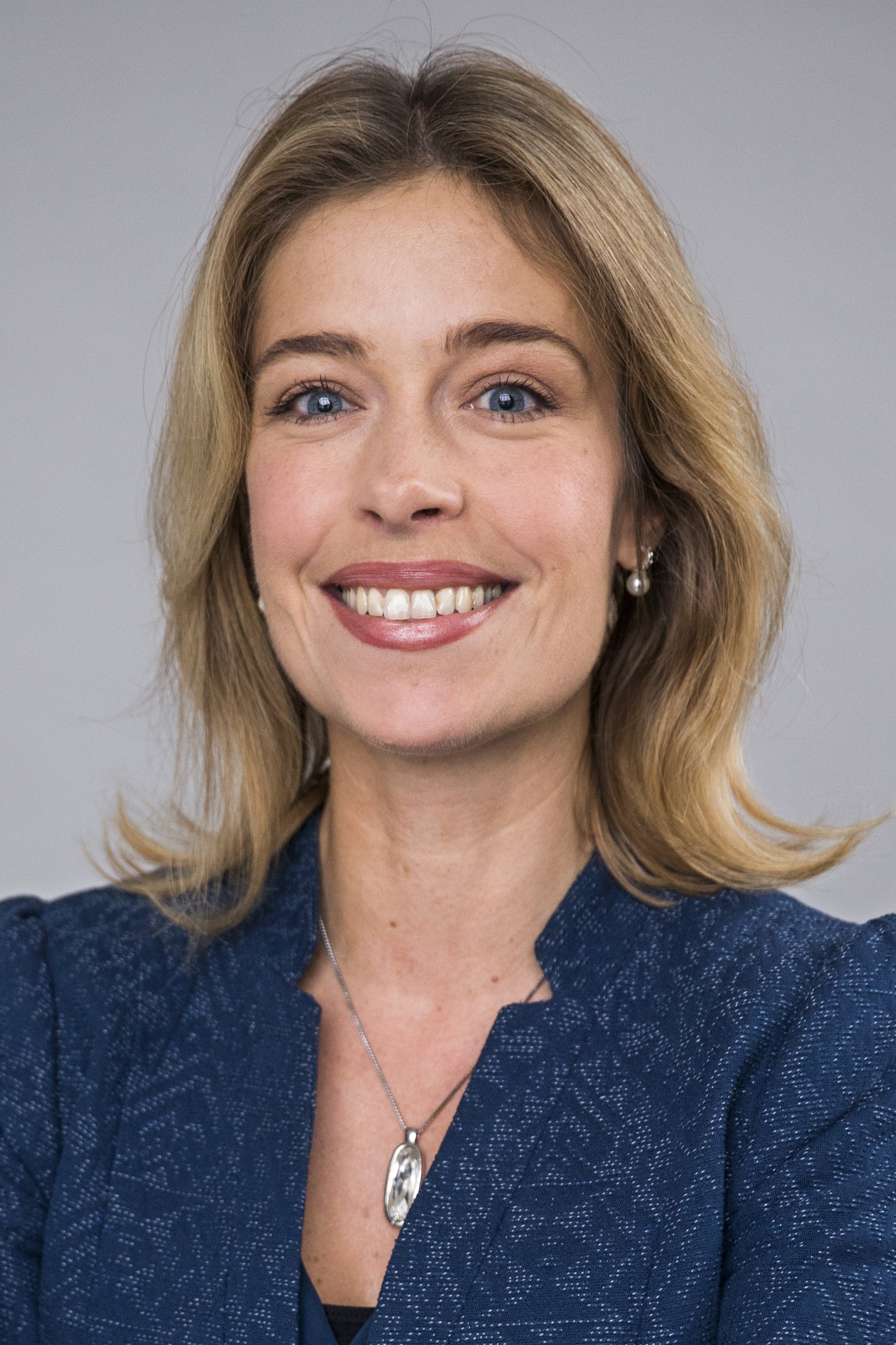
Annika Strandhäll

In 2018, the government fired Director-General Ann-Marie Begler of the Social Insurance Agency. The Minister for Social Security, Annika Strandhäll, stated that the government had been dissatisfied with Begler's performance for a long time and that she had voluntarily resigned, something that Begler denied. Additionally, e-mails were sent to the Riksdag Constitution Committee by senior managers at the Social Insurance Agency. The senior managers accused Minister Strandhäll of lying and demanded that Begler be reinstated.

Criticism from major political parties started with the Moderates, with Ulf Kristersson accusing the government of firing the Director-General for the purposes of electioneering. The liberal-conservative party spearheaded an effort to sack the Minister for Social Security through a motion of no-confidence, an effort which had the support of the Moderates, the Christian Democrats and the Sweden Democrats. On the evening of 27 May, the Centre Party announced that it would not be supporting the vote of no-confidence against Strandhäll. The vote was held on 28 May and failed, with 172 MPs supporting the motion, 113 voting against and 59 abstaining. Support is required from at least 175 MPs. Strandhäll received a formal warning from the Riksdag Constitution Committee in June 2019.

=== Reform of the Public Employment Service ===
In accordance with the January Agreement, the government initiated a reform of the Public Employment Service to open the market for competition from employment agencies in the private sector. This, in combination with the adoption of the conservative-authored 2019 state budget, resulted in a major budget cut for the agency. In early 2019, the Service announced that they would be closing 132 offices around the country, sacking 4,500 employees. The cuts drew severe criticism from opposition parties, with the Left Party threatening a vote of no-confidence against Minister for Employment Eva Nordmark on 21 November, a move which by December was backed by the three conservative opposition parties. As a result, the government was forced to put the reform on hold for a year. In a memo, the government authorized the Public Employment Service to ensure adequate service in areas where the closures of local offices had been ordered.

As of February 2020, service had been restored in 99 of the 132 areas where the agency had previously decided to close their offices.

=== Market rent reform and government crisis ===
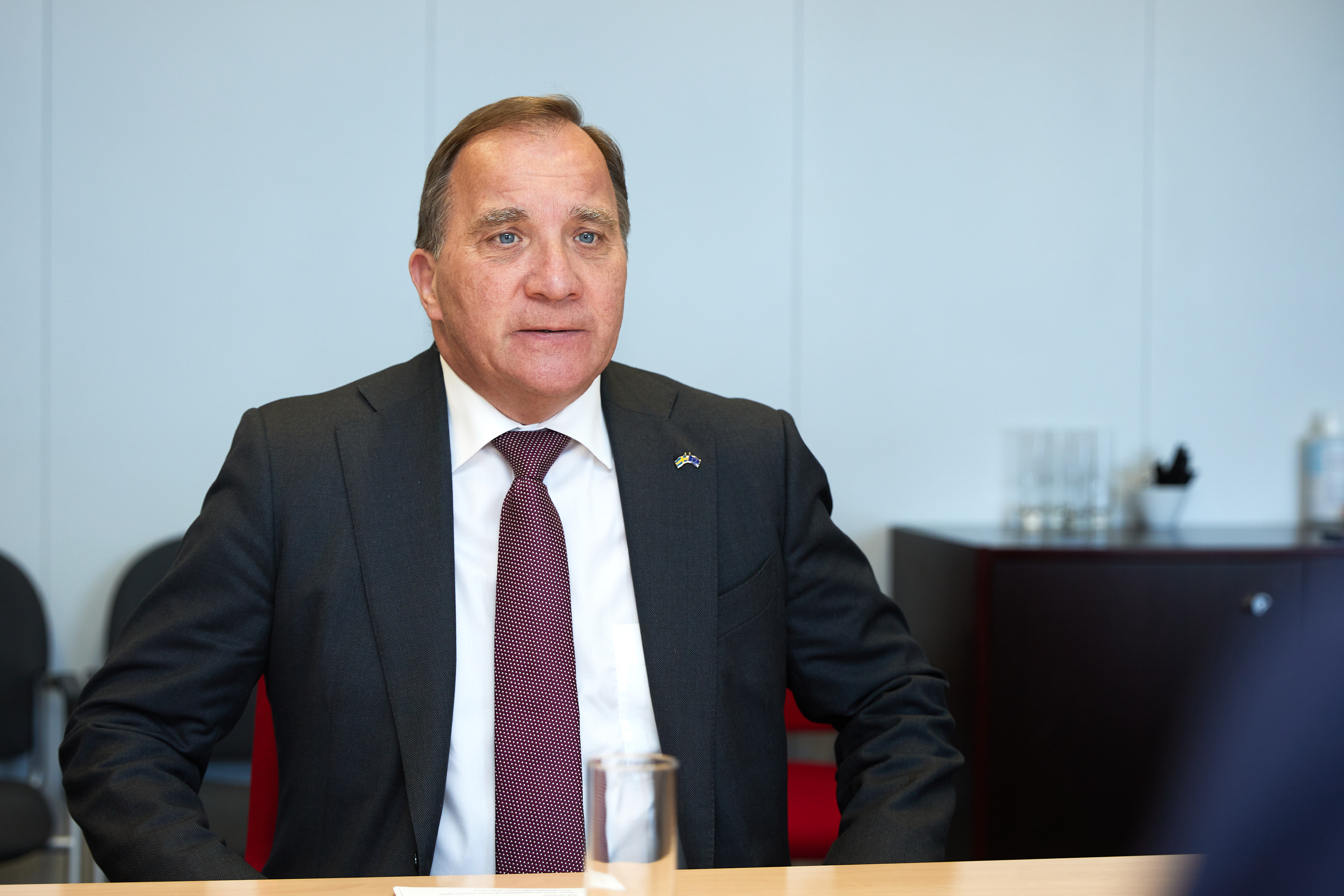
Stefan Löfven

As part of the January Agreement, the government had announced an inquiry into reforming the housing market by allowing for unregulated rents on newly built residential housing developments. The inquiry was completed on 4 June 2021 and the proposal would give property owners the ability to freely set rents on newly constructed housing, upon agreement with their tenants. Rents would primarily be allowed to increase in line only with the consumer price index, or due to a "change in circumstances". If the landlord and tenant cannot come to an agreement, the rent amount can be tried with the rent tribunal.

In response, the Left Party presented the government with an ultimatum on 15 June. The government would receive 48 hours to withdraw the proposal, or else the Left would initiate a vote of no-confidence against the Prime Minister. On 17 June, the Left Party formally requested a vote of no-confidence and shortly thereafter, the Sweden Democrats filed their own such request. The Moderates and Christian Democrats announced that they would vote in line with the opposition against the government. The vote was held on 10 a.m on 21 June, and Prime Minister Stefan Löfven was voted out of office by vote of 181–109, with 59 MPs abstaining. According to the Instrument of Government, the Prime Minister has one week to either resign or announce whether or not to call for a snap election. On 28 June, Löfven offered his resignation, leaving the government in a caretaker capacity until a new government is appointed. The Speaker of the Riksdag was tasked with finding a government constellation to form a new cabinet. On 7 July, Stefan Löfven was re-elected as Prime Minister and his third government was installed on 9 July.

== Notes ==
Preceded by Löfven I cabinet	Cabinet of Sweden; 2019–2021	Succeeded by Löfven III cabinet
