= Löfven III cabinet =

Government of Sweden in 2021

Stefan Löfven's third cabinet
- 55th Cabinet of Sweden

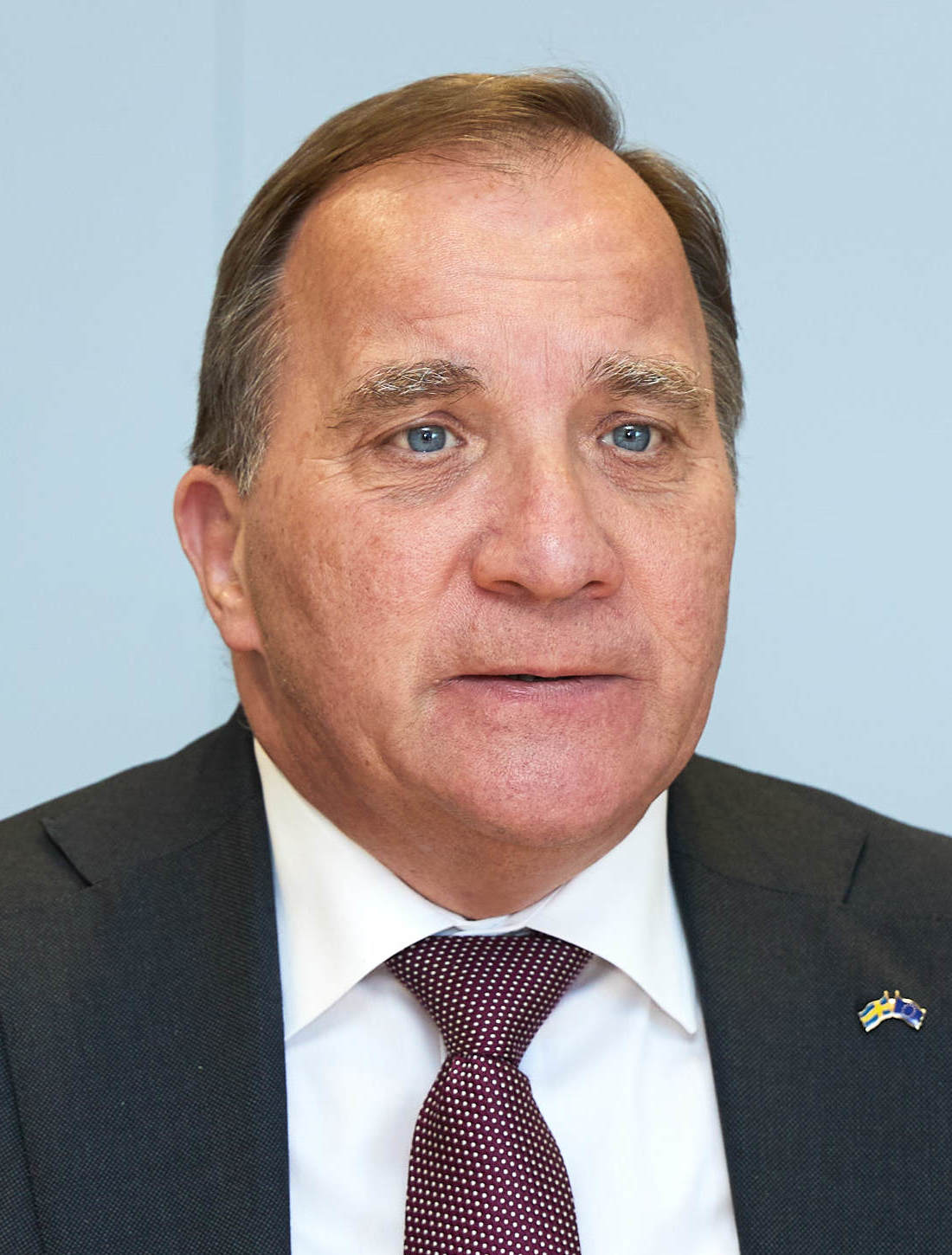
- Löfven in 2021
- Date formed: 9 July 2021
- Date dissolved: 30 November 2021

People and organisations
- Head of state: Carl XVI Gustaf
- Head of government: Stefan Löfven
- Deputy head of government: Per Bolund (MP; de jure) (Note: Prime Minister Löfven had not appointed a deputy prime minister in accordance with 8 § Chapter 6 of the Instrument of Government. Thus, the de facto deputy prime minister defaulted to the longest-serving member of the cabinet, Morgan Johansson. Bolund's title vice statsminister was ceremonial.); Morgan Johansson (S; de facto)
- No. of ministers: 22
- Member parties: Social Democrats; Green Party
- Status in legislature: Coalition minority with passive support from Centre Party and Left Party
- Opposition parties: Moderate Party; Sweden Democrats; Christian Democrats; Liberals
- Opposition leader: Ulf Kristersson (M)

History
- Incoming formation: Motion of no confidence
- Outgoing formation: Resignation of Stefan Löfven
- Election: 2018 election
- Legislature terms: 2018–2022
- Predecessor: Löfven II cabinet
- Successor: Andersson cabinet

The Löfven III cabinet (Swedish: regeringen Löfven III) was the government of Sweden from 9 July to 30 November 2021. It was a coalition minority government between the Social Democrats and the Green Party, led by Prime Minister Stefan Löfven of the Social Democrats. The cabinet was the result of the aftermath of the 2021 government crisis, which saw the Löfven II cabinet removed from power in a vote of no-confidence over proposed reforms to liberalise the rent control system.

The cabinet was installed on 9 July 2021, after a formal government meeting with King Carl XVI Gustaf. On 10 November 2021, Löfven asked to be dismissed as prime minister and the cabinet became a caretaker government. The cabinet was succeeded by the Social Democratic single-party Andersson cabinet.

With only a total of 32.7 percent of the popular votes in 2018 and 116 out of 349 seats (33%) in the Riksdag (Swedish parliament), the "red-green" coalition remained as one of the smallest minority governments in Swedish history and relied on support from other parties in the Riksdag.

== Formation ==
On 21 June 2021, Stefan Löfven lost a vote of no-confidence in the Riksdag, which led to a government crisis. The vote was conducted following a motion from the Sweden Democrats, prompted by the Left Party's criticism of the government's housing policy. According to the constitution, the Prime Minister was given a week to either resign or call a snap election. On 28 June 2021, Prime Minister Stefan Löfven asked the Speaker of the Riksdag Andreas Norlén to be dismissed as Prime Minister, which led to the government being considered to have resigned and thus became a caretaker government.

Beginning on 29 June 2021, the Speaker hosted meetings, where all party leaders met the Speaker to give their views on a candidate for Prime Minister which could be supported in the Riksdag. The Speaker first gave an exploratory assignment to the Moderates's Ulf Kristersson, whomever, refrained from being voted by in the chamber, stating he would not gain enough support to form a new cabinet. Thereafter, Social Democratic Stefan Löfven, got to test his confidence. On 5 July, the Speaker presented his proposal to the Riksdag to elect Stefan Löfven as Prime Minister. The matter was tabled the same day, and again the following day, and then taken up for decision by voting in the Riksdag on 7 July.

On 7 July 2021, the Riksdag voted on Stefan Löfven as Prime Minister. 116 voted yes, 60 abstained, and 173 opposed. Because of Sweden's "negative parliamentarism", this is understood as an approval as more MPs tolerated the proposal than not (176–173).

The government assumed office on 9 July 2021 after Prime Minister Löfven had first informed the Riksdag of his ministers and then during a formal government meeting, called a ’Konselj’, with HM King Carl XVI Gustaf.

== Ministers ==
Apart from the abolition of the post Minister for Rural Affairs, the new version of the cabinet was the same as the former Löfven II cabinet.

The following were the cabinet members:

Portfolio	Minister	Took office	Left office	Party
Prime Minister's Office
Prime Minister	Stefan Löfven	9 July 2021	30 November 2021	Social Democrats
Deputy Prime Minister not a separate minister post	Morgan Johansson (de facto)	9 July 2021	30 November 2021	Social Democrats
Deputy Prime Minister not a separate minister post	Per Bolund (de jure)	9 July 2021	30 November 2021	Green
Minister for EU Affairs	Hans Dahlgren	9 July 2021	30 November 2021	Social Democrats
Ministry of Justice
Minister for Justice; Minister for Migration	Morgan Johansson	9 July 2021	30 November 2021	Social Democrats
Minister of the Interior	Mikael Damberg	9 July 2021	30 November 2021	Social Democrats
Ministry of Foreign Affairs
Minister for Foreign Affairs	Ann Linde	9 July 2021	30 November 2021	Social Democrats
Minister of Foreign Trade; Minister for Nordic Cooperation	Anna Hallberg	9 July 2021	30 November 2021	Social Democrats
Minister for International Development Cooperation	Per Olsson Fridh	9 July 2021	30 November 2021	Green
Ministry of Defence
Minister for Defence	Peter Hultqvist	9 July 2021	30 November 2021	Social Democrats
Ministry of Health and Social Affairs
Minister for Health and Social Affairs	Lena Hallengren	9 July 2021	30 November 2021	Social Democrats
Minister for Social Security	Ardalan Shekarabi	9 July 2021	30 November 2021	Social Democrats
Ministry of Finance
Minister for Finance	Magdalena Andersson	9 July 2021	30 November 2021	Social Democrats
Minister for Financial Markets; Deputy Minister for Finance	Åsa Lindhagen	9 July 2021	30 November 2021	Green
Minister for Public Administration; Minister for Consumer Affairs	Lena Micko	9 July 2021	30 November 2021	Social Democrats
Ministry of Education and Research
Minister for Education	Anna Ekström	9 July 2021	30 November 2021	Social Democrats
Minister for Higher Education and Research	Matilda Ernkrans	9 July 2021	30 November 2021	Social Democrats
Ministry of the Environment
Minister for the Environment; Minister for the Climate	Per Bolund	9 July 2021	30 November 2021	Green
Ministry of Enterprise and Innovation
Minister for Enterprise	Ibrahim Baylan	9 July 2021	30 November 2021	Social Democrats
Ministry of Culture
Minister for Culture; Minister for Democracy; Minister for Sports	Amanda Lind	9 July 2021	30 November 2021	Green
Ministry of Employment
Minister for Employment	Eva Nordmark	9 July 2021	30 November 2021	Social Democrats
Minister for Gender Equality; Minister for Housing; Minister with responsibility for anti-discrimination, anti-segregation and urban development	Märta Stenevi	9 July 2021	30 November 2021	Green
Ministry of Infrastructure
Minister for Infrastructure	Tomas Eneroth	9 July 2021	30 November 2021	Social Democrats
Minister for Energy; Minister for Digital Development	Anders Ygeman	9 July 2021	30 November 2021	Social Democrats

== Policy ==
During a press conference after the cabinet took office on 9 July, Prime Minister Löfven announced that he viewed the COVID-19 pandemic to have exposed both the strengths and weaknesses of Swedish society, and his cabinet should be focused on creating improvements to it. Löfven introduced four main policy areas of high importance to the government's work: employment, safety issues, climate, and welfare.

A more specific policy manifesto was presented when Löfven held his declaration of government (regeringsförklaring) on the opening of the Riksdag's new working year on 14 September 2021.

== Löfven's resignation ==
On 22 August 2021, Stefan Löfven announced his plans on resigning as party leader for the Social Democrats, and thereafter as Sweden's Prime Minister. According to the constitution, if the Prime Minister resigns, the whole cabinet also needs to resign and becomes automatically dismissed. He is expected to step down during his party's congress in November 2021. The time plan became reality, and the Löfven III cabinet marked the shortest time in office of any Swedish government since Ola Ullsten's cabinet, in office from October 1978 to October 1979. On 4 November 2021, Magdalena Andersson was chosen as new party leader for the Social Democrats.

Stefan Löfven tendered his resignation to the Speaker on 10 November 2021. The Speaker requested Löfven's cabinet to remain as a caretaker government, stripped of some executive power, until a new prime minister has been approved by the Riksdag.

Government formation talks to elect Löfven's successor started with Magdalena Andersson being tasked with forming a government on 11 November. On 16 November, Andersson asked the speaker to get a couple more days to continue negotiations with the Left Party to strike a deal to gain the party's support. Already having an agreement with the Centre Party, a settlement would de facto make Andersson prime minister. On 22 November the Speaker announced the Riksdag would vote on Andersson on 24 November, despite there not being an agreement with the Left Party. Less than 24 hours remaining until the vote, the intended government and the Left Party finally reached a deal, promising Andersson's cabinet would increase the lower limit of the guaranteed pension for the unemployed in exchange for the Left Party's confidence and supply. On 24 November, Andersson was approved by the Riksdag to become Sweden's new prime minister but resigned just seven hours later, after the Green Party left the government cooperation. On 30 November, the Social Democratic single-party Andersson cabinet was installed.

== Notes ==
Preceded by Löfven II cabinet	Cabinet of Sweden; 2021	Succeeded by Andersson cabinet
