= Per Olsson Fridh =

Swedish politician (born 1981)

Per Olsson
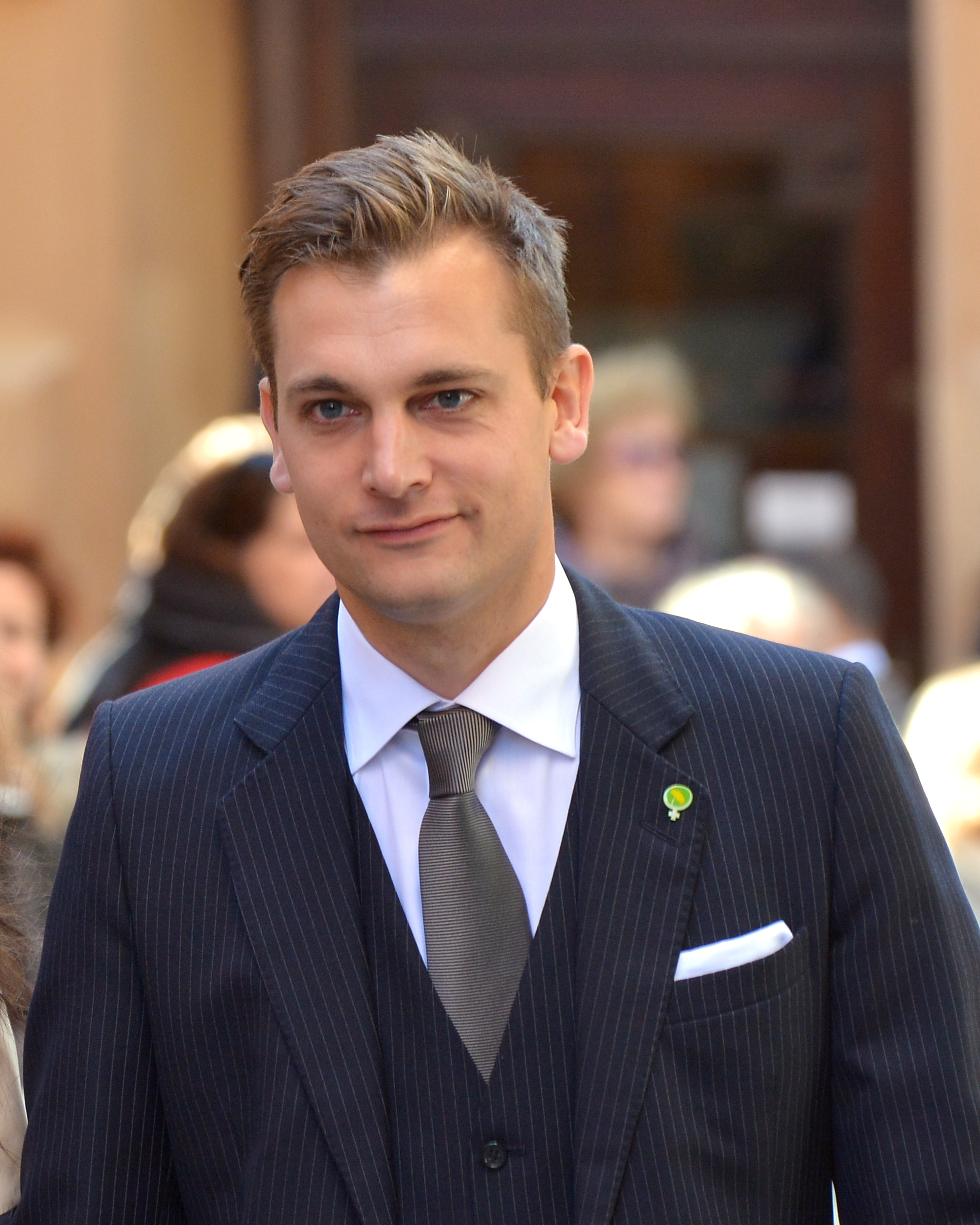

Minister for International Development Cooperation
- In office 5 February 2021 – 30 November 2021
- Monarch: Carl XVI Gustaf
- Prime Minister: Stefan Löfven
- Preceded by: Isabella Lövin (acting)
- Succeeded by: Matilda Ernkrans

Personal details
- Born: 27 June 1981 (age 45) Sweden
- Party: Green Party
- Education: Lund University (B.S in sociology)
- Cabinet: Löfven II Cabinet; Löfven III Cabinet

Per Olsson Fridh (born 27 June 1981) is a Swedish politician for the Green Party. He served as Minister for International Development Cooperation from February to November 2021.

He previously served as state secretary to Alice Bah Kuhnke, the Minister of Culture and Democracy, from 2014 to 2019 and then as state secretary to Peter Eriksson, the Minister for International Development Cooperation, from 2019 until his own appointment as cabinet minister.

== Personal life ==
Olsson Fridh grew up in Lomma and in Malmö. He is married to Madeleine Kaharascho Fridh, a Feminist Inititative politician who is serving on the Stockholm City Council.

== Career ==
Olsson Fridh has previously served as the Chairman of the Stockholm chapter of the Green Party. He was elected to the Riksdag following the 2014 general election but was appointed State Secretary to Alice Bah Kuhnke, the Minister of Culture and Democracy, a few weeks later.

== Other activities ==
- Joint World Bank-IMF Development Committee, Alternate Member

Political offices
Preceded by Isabella Lövin (acting)	Minister for International Development Cooperation; 2021	Succeeded by Matilda Ernkrans
