= Linnéa Engström =

Swedish politician

Linnéa Engström MEP
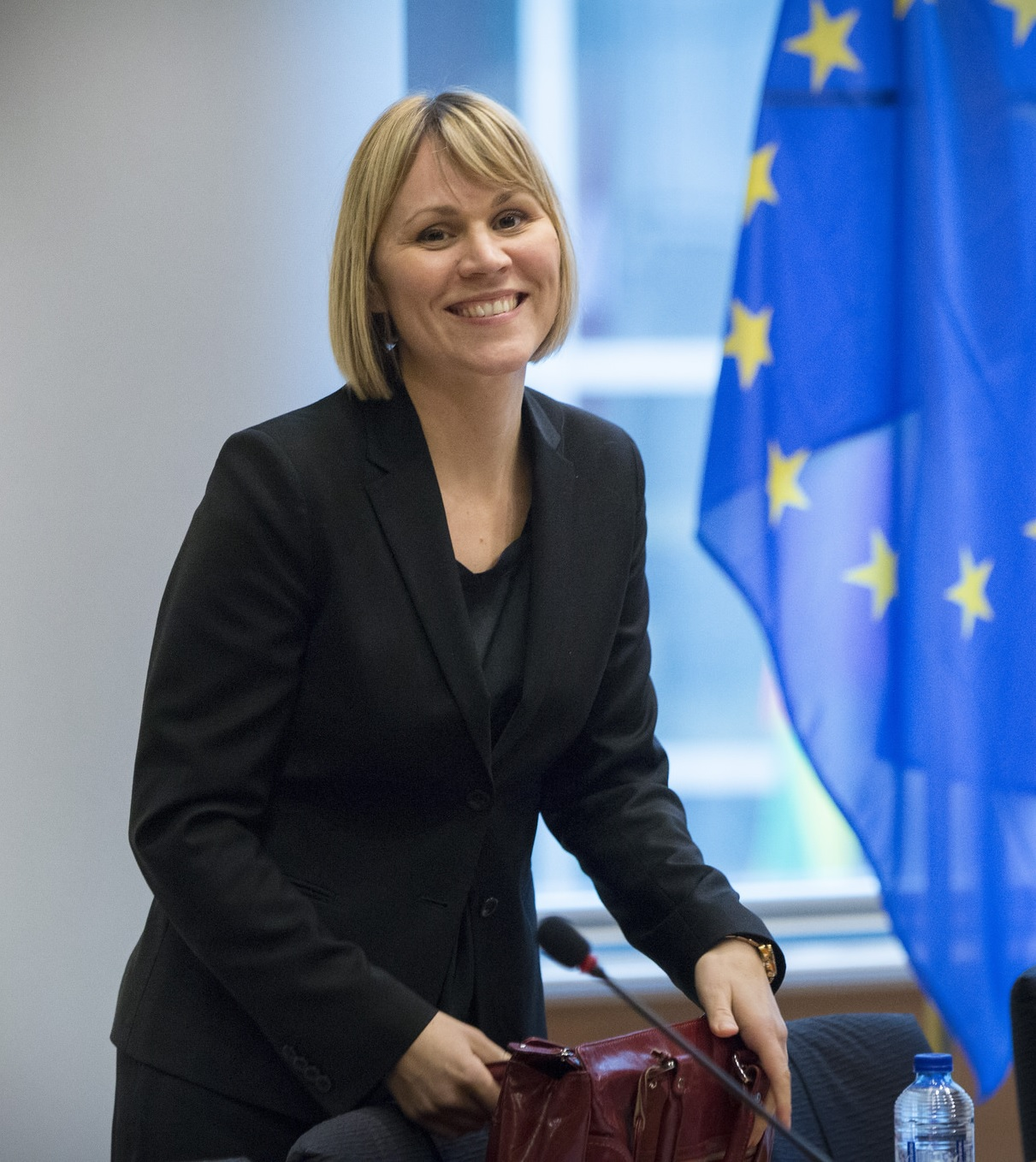

Member of the European Parliament
- In office 2014–2019
- Constituency: Sweden

Personal details
- Born: 2 April 1981 (age 45) Uppsala, Sweden
- Party: Swedish; Green Party; EU; European Green Party
- Education: Swedish Defence University University of Uppsala

Linnéa Engström (born 2 April 1981) is a Swedish Green Party politician who was a Member of the European Parliament from 2014 until 2019. During her time in parliament, she served as Vice-Chair of the Committee on Fisheries.

== Biography ==
Engström has a master's degree in political science from the Swedish Defense University. Before she became EU parliamentarian she worked as an equality coordinator in the Green Party and has been a member of the Green Forum Board. She has worked with development assistance aimed at Russia, Georgia, Belarus and Eastern Europe.

Before the European Parliament elections in 2014, Engström stood in fifth place on the Green Party's list. In the election, the Green Party received four mandates, and she became the first replacement for this party. After the Isabella Lövin has been appointed as minister, Linnéa Engström became a member of October 2014.

Engström was the first Vice Chairman of the European Parliament Committee on Fisheries and replacement in the European Parliament Committee on the Environment, Public Health and Food Safety, European Parliament Committee on Women's Rights and Gender Equality, and in the delegation for relations with the People's Republic of China.

Engström was initiator and rapporteur for the first report in the European Parliament on women, gender equality and climate law.

In May 2016, Engström debuted with the book Climate Feminism. The book combines the struggle for the climate with the struggle for a more fair world and contains portraits of some of the green operations' main advocate for climate law. Queen Fish is her second book that released in May 2017. It addresses the common challenges with sea and fishing, and bind these together with a feminist and fair policy.

Before the European Parliament elections in 2019, Engström expressed wishes to continue its mission, but the nomination committee chose not to bring her on candidate list.
