= Matilda Ernkrans =

Swedish politician (born 1973)

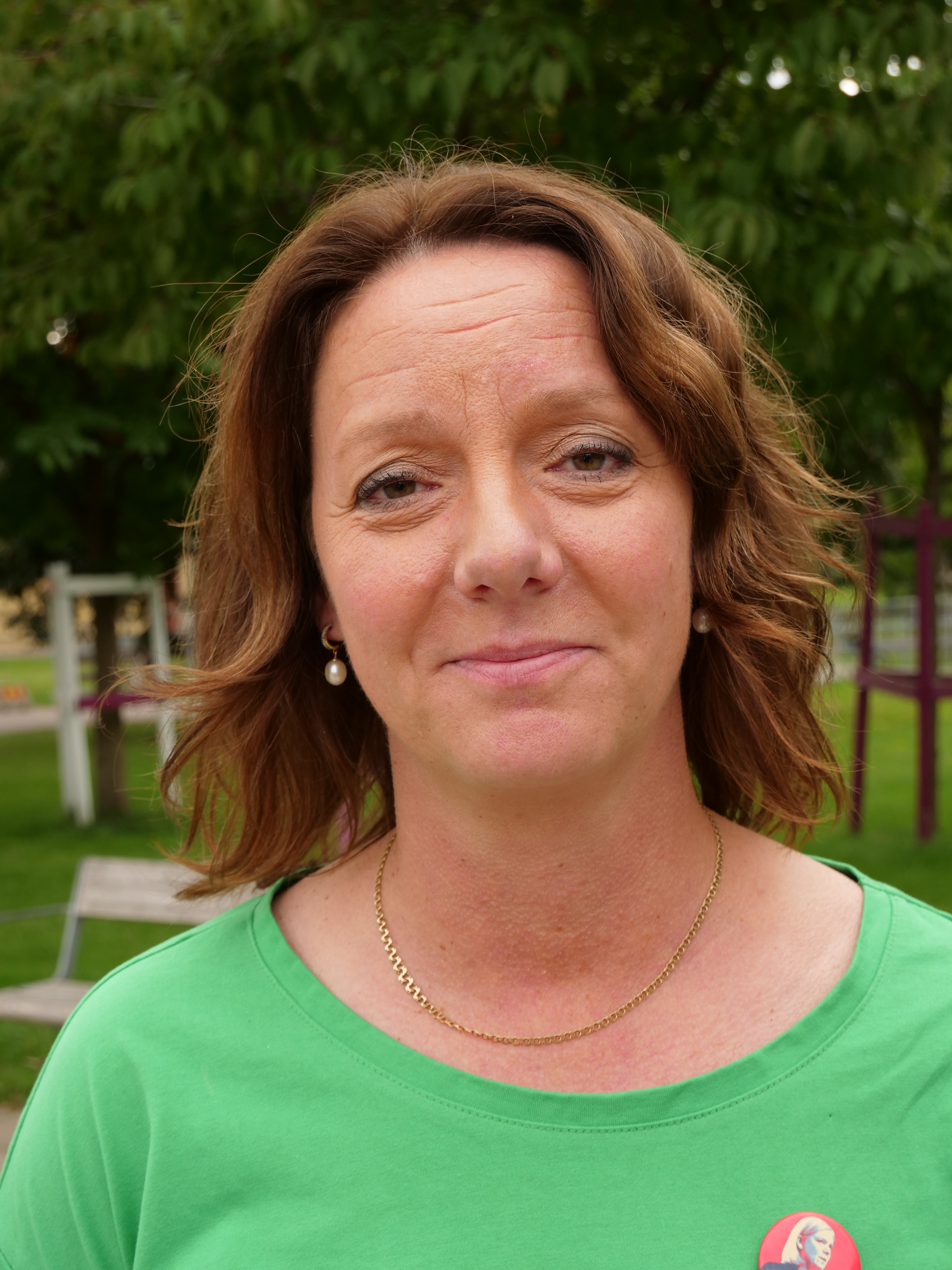
- Matilda Ernkrans in 2022

Minister for International Development Cooperation
- In office 30 November 2021 – 17 October 2022
- Monarch: Carl XVI Gustaf
- Prime Minister: Magdalena Andersson
- Preceded by: Per Olsson Fridh
- Succeeded by: Johan Forssell

Minister for Higher Education and Research
- In office 21 January 2019 – 30 November 2021
- Monarch: Carl XVI Gustaf
- Prime Minister: Stefan Löfven
- Preceded by: Helene Hellmark Knutsson
- Succeeded by: Lina Axelsson Kihlbom (Minister for Schools)

Personal details
- Born: 12 March 1973 (age 53) Hallsberg, Sweden
- Party: Social Democrats
- Spouse: Stefan Bernström

Matilda Elisabeth Ernkrans (born 12 March 1973) is a Swedish politician of the Social Democratic Party. She served as Minister for International Development Cooperation from 2021 to 2022 and previously served as Minister for Higher Education and Research January 2019 to November 2021. She has been a member of the Riksdag since 2006 and a replacement member of the Riksdag from 2002 to 2006.

== Early life and education ==
Erknkrans was born in Hallsberg.

== Political career ==
In 2002, Ernkrans was elected to the Riksdag, from Örebro County. From 2004 to 2006, she was a member of the Committee on Cultural Affairs. From 2006 to 2010, she was a member of the Committee on Social Insurance. From 2010 to 2018, she was chair of the Committee on Environment and Agriculture. In 2018, she was chair of the Committee on Education.

== Other activities ==
- Multilateral Investment Guarantee Agency (MIGA), World Bank Group, Ex-Officio Alternate Member of the Board of Governors (2021–2022)
- World Bank, Ex-Officio Alternate Member of the Board of Governors (2021–2022)
