= Isabella Lövin =

Swedish politician (born 1963)

Isabella Lövin MEP
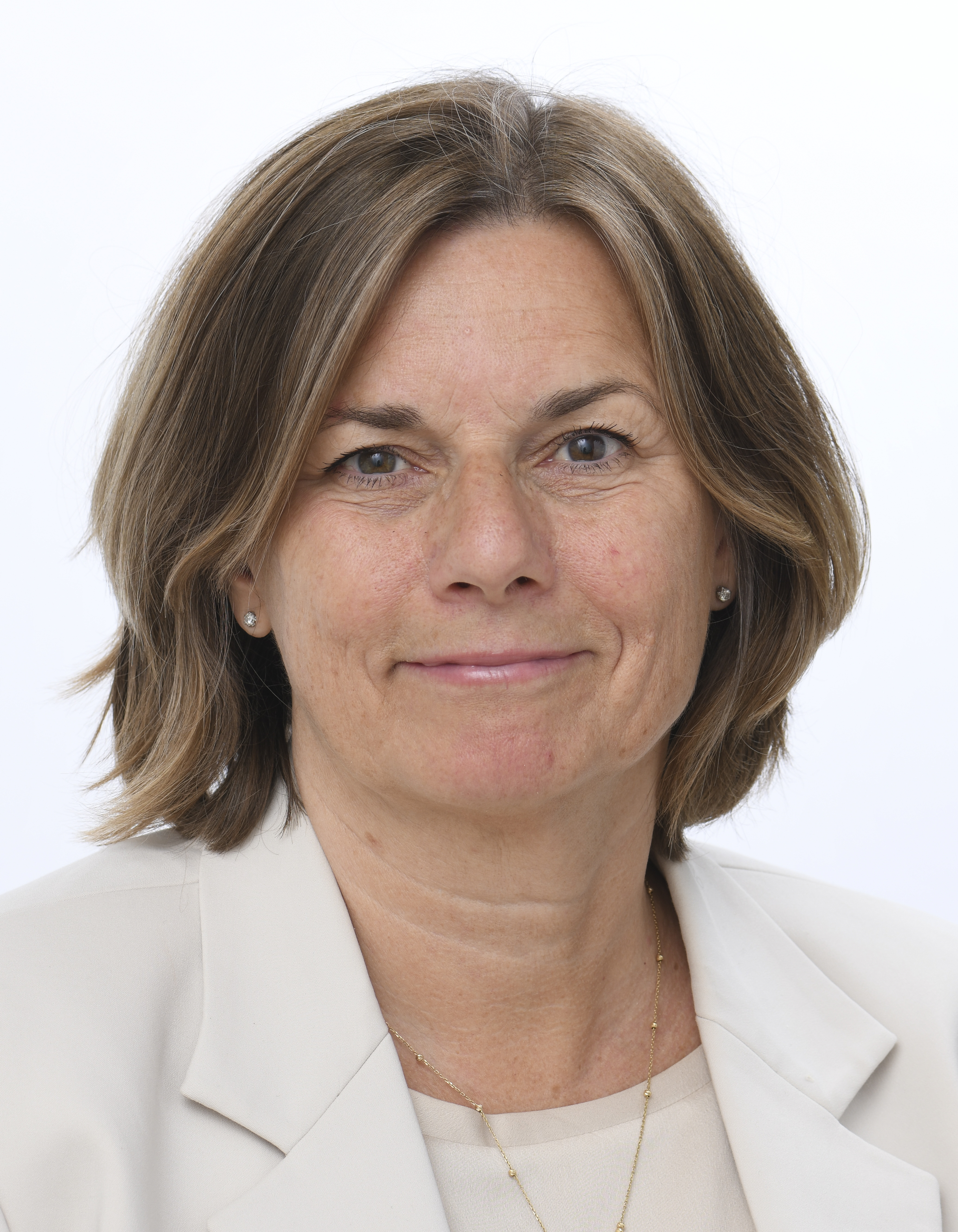
- Official portrait, 2024

Deputy Prime Minister of Sweden (honorary title)
- In office 25 May 2016 – 5 February 2021 Serving with Margot Wallström (2016–2019); Morgan Johansson (2019–2021)
- Monarch: Carl XVI Gustaf
- Prime Minister: Stefan Löfven
- Preceded by: Åsa Romson
- Succeeded by: Per Bolund

Minister for the Environment
- In office 21 January 2019 – 5 February 2021
- Monarch: Carl XVI Gustaf
- Prime Minister: Stefan Löfven
- Preceded by: Karolina Skog
- Succeeded by: Per Bolund

Minister for International Development Cooperation
- In office 17 December 2020 – 5 February 2021
- Monarch: Carl XVI Gustaf
- Prime Minister: Stefan Löfven
- Preceded by: Peter Eriksson
- Succeeded by: Per Olsson Fridh
- In office 3 October 2014 – 21 January 2019
- Monarch: Carl XVI Gustaf
- Prime Minister: Stefan Löfven
- Preceded by: Hillevi Engström
- Succeeded by: Peter Eriksson

Spokesperson of the Green Party
- In office 13 May 2016 – 31 January 2021 Serving with Gustav Fridolin (2016–2019); Per Bolund (2019–2021)
- Preceded by: Åsa Romson
- Succeeded by: Märta Stenevi

Member of the European Parliament
- Incumbent
- Assumed office 16 July 2024
- Constituency: Sweden
- In office 1 July 2009 – 3 October 2014
- Constituency: Sweden

Personal details
- Born: 3 February 1963 (age 63) Helsingborg, Sweden
- Party: Green Party
- Parent: Björn Lövin (father)

Isabella Lövin (born 3 February 1963) is a Swedish politician for the Green Party. She served as Minister for International Development Cooperation from 2014 to 2019, as Minister for the Environment from 2019 to 2021 and as honorary Deputy Prime Minister of Sweden from 2016 to 2021. She led the Green Party as co-spokesperson from 2016 to 2021, sharing the task with Gustav Fridolin (2014-2019) and Per Bolund (2019-2021).

An author and journalist by profession, Lövin served as a Member of European Parliament (MEP) from the 2009 election until becoming cabinet minister in October 2014. Her area in the European Parliament was fisheries questions. Lövin has been awarded with Stora Journalistpriset for her work in the field of journalism, particularly her articles about fishery.

On 26 August 2020, Lövin announced her resignation from politics altogether. She will remain in office until a new spokesperson is appointed in 2021.

== Early life and education ==
Lövin was born in Helsingborg as the daughter of artist Björn Lövin. She studied film studies, political science, sociology and Italian at Stockholm University. She also studied at the University College of Film, Radio, Television and Theatre.

== Career ==
Lövin has been reporter and freelance writer for Damernas Värld, Veckorevyn, Elle and Vi Föräldrar, and written chronicles about the environment in Expressen's Sunday supplement "Green Sunday". From 1994 to 1997, Lövin worked as a reporter and producer at Sveriges Radio P1's community editorial board for programs such as Slussen and Tendens. Subsequently, she worked as editorial secretary and editor of Månadsjournalen until 2002 when she, after having been an editor at food magazine Allt om Mat, worked as editor of magazine Leva! in 2003. In 2004, Lövin was re freelance writer and in 2005 she wrote columns for Allt om Mat and concurrently served as a freelance web editor for Femina.

Her 2007 book on fishing policy was published into English in 2012 under the title Silent seas: the fish race to the bottom.

== Political career ==
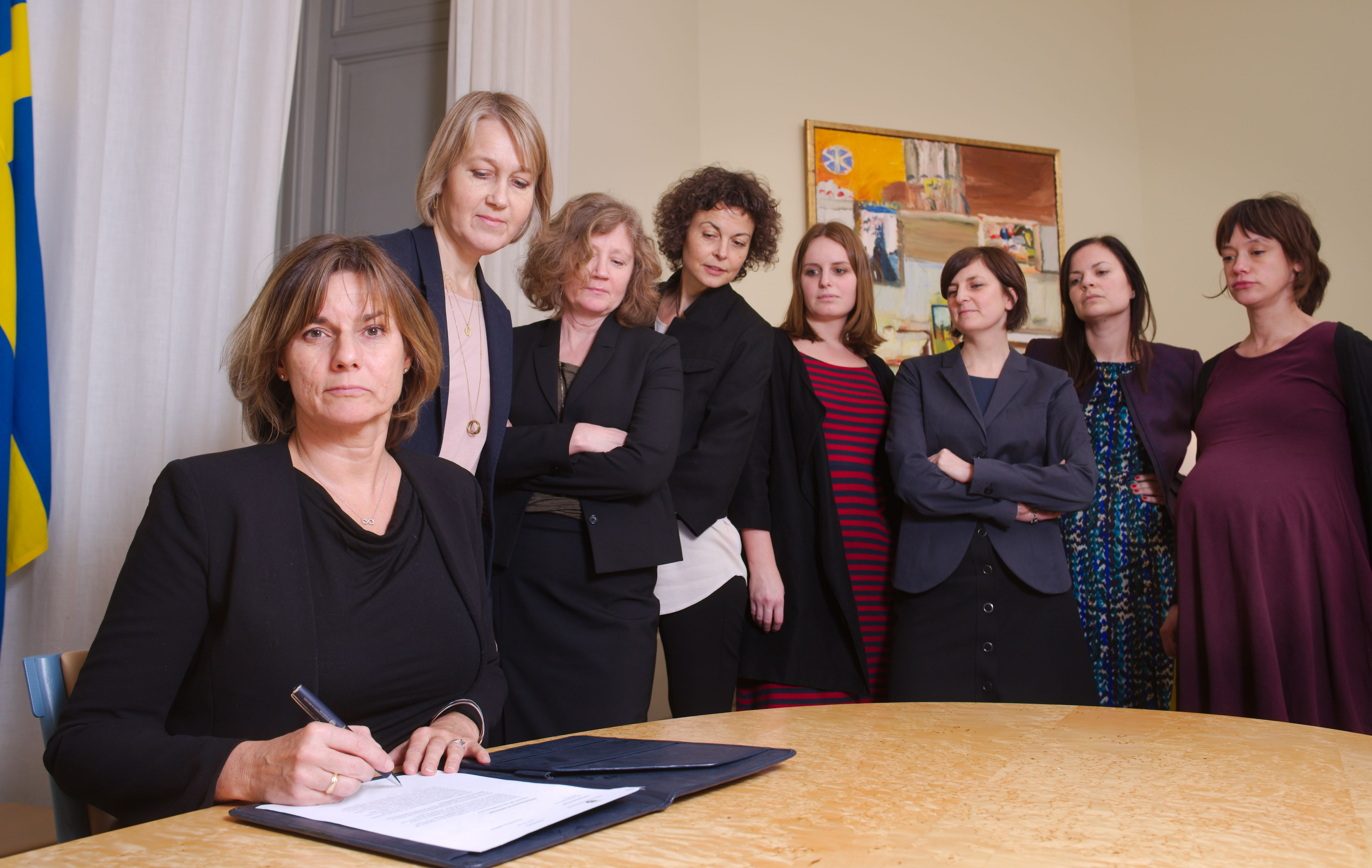
In 2017, the Swedish climate law is signed by Isabella Lövin, surrounded by her political staffers

=== Member of the European Parliament, 2009–2014 ===
Lövin was elected to the European Parliament in the 2009 European Parliament election, as a member of the Green Party. She was re-elected in the 2014 European Parliament election and was appointed as vice chair of the Committee on Fisheries. She served as special rapporteur of the external dimension of the Common Fisheries Policy and the role of the EU in fighting illegal fisheries globally.

In September 2010 Lövin voted in favour of the Draft report on enhancing the enforcement of intellectual property rights in the internal market. The critics, among them the Pirate Party and the Young Greens, found this motion contradictory to the Green Party's stance on CopyRight. Lövin stated that the vote was aligned with party politics and that her vote had been in favour of protecting the rights of small artists to get paid for their work.

In 2013, Lövin was one of four Members of the European Parliament who were turned back by Moroccan authorities en route to the disputed territory of Western Sahara; the cross-party group of MEPs had been on a fact-finding mission on human rights in the region.

=== Minister for International Development Cooperation, 2014–2019 ===
Lövin was appointed Minister for International Development Cooperation on 3 October 2014 by Prime Minister Stefan Löfven.

=== Green Party spokesperson, 2016–2021 ===
On 9 May 2016, Lövin was nominated by her party's national election committee to succeed Åsa Romson as one of two spokespersons of the Green Party.

Lövin gained international recognition in February 2017 from her post on social media showing her surrounded by seven female colleagues while signing a climate goal referral. This was perceived by many in the public as a criticism of US president Donald Trumps signing of executive orders on abortion rights in the company of only male colleagues. Lövin has commented that the photograph demonstrates that Sweden is a feminist government and that it is up to the observer to interpret its message.

=== Minister for the Environment, 2019–2021 ===
Lövin was appointed Minister for the Environment on 21 January 2019 by Prime Minister Stefan Löfven.

=== Member of the European Parliament, 2024–present ===
In parliament, Lövin has been serving on the Committee on Development, the Committee on Industry, Research and Energy and the Committee on Fisheries.

In 2026, Lövin stood as candidate for the leadership of the Greens–European Free Alliance's group in the European Parliament; however, she ultimately lost against Nicolae Ștefănuță.

== Other activities ==
- Multilateral Investment Guarantee Agency (MIGA), World Bank Group, Ex-Officio Alternate Member of the Board of Governors
- World Bank, Ex-Officio Alternate Member of the Board of Governors

Party political offices
Preceded by Åsa Romson	Spokesperson of the Green Party Serving with: Gustav Fridolin (2016–2019); Per Bolund (2019– ) 2016–2021	Succeeded by Märta Stenevi
Political offices
Preceded by –	Member of the European Parliament from Sweden; 2009–2014	Succeeded by Linnéa Engström
Preceded by Hillevi Engström	Minister for International Development Cooperation; 2014–2019	Succeeded by Peter Eriksson
Preceded by Åsa Romson	Minister for the Climate; 2016–2021	Succeeded by Per Bolund
Preceded by Åsa Romson	Deputy Prime Minister of Sweden (honorary title) Serving with: Margot Wallström (2016–2019); Morgan Johansson (2019–2021; 2016–2021	Succeeded by Per Bolund
Preceded by Karolina Skog	Minister for the Environment; 2019–2021	Succeeded by Per Bolund
Preceded by Peter Eriksson	Minister for International Development Cooperation (acting); 2020–2021	Succeeded by Per Olsson Fridh
