= Employment Protection Act (of Sweden) =

Swedish legislation regulating the labour market

The Employment Protection Act, (Swedish: Lagen om anställningsskydd, often abbreviated as LAS) is a labour-market regulation in Sweden. The current law was adopted and entered into the Code of Statutes in 1982, when it replaced a previous Employment Protection Act from 1974. It provides extensive protection for employees from termination and regulates some employment contracts. Swedish labour market regulation generally relies heavily on collective bargaining between trade unions and Employers' organizations. Even though several parts of the Employment Protection act can be overridden by collective agreements, it still constitutes an extensive direct state regulation.

== Regulation ==
The Employment Protection act regulates termination of employment and minimum notice times, priority of rehiring, and lawful reasons for termination (restricted to redundancy and personal reasons like misconduct). In case of termination due to redundancy, the law requires workplaces to fire their staff according to a list of seniority (Swedish: turordningslista). Given similar tasks, the last employee to be hired will be the first to be fired. In the case of similar age amongst employees, priority is given to older employees.

The Employment Protection act primarily protects employees hired on indefinite contracts (Swedish: tillsvidareanställning). Employees on contracts with predefined limited times of employment may still be terminated outside the seniority hierarchy of their workplace. The fifth paragraph of the act states that employees who have been hired on limited-time contracts by the same employer during two years within a five-year period must be rehired on an indefinite contract.

== Political implications ==
The act adopted in 1974 marked a breaking point of a largely hands-off attitude by the state in place since the established with the Saltsjöbaden Agreement in 1938. Even though the act circumscribes the extent to which collective bargaining regulates the labour-market, left-wing supporters of the claim the benefits of act's labour security and promotion of indefinite contracts. Liberal critics, on the other hand, claim that decreased flexibility increases thresholds to hiring and blocks employers from firing incompetent labour.
