= Minister for International Development Cooperation (Sweden) =

Swedish cabinet position

Minister for International Development Cooperation and Foreign Trade of Sweden
- Lesser coat of arms of Sweden

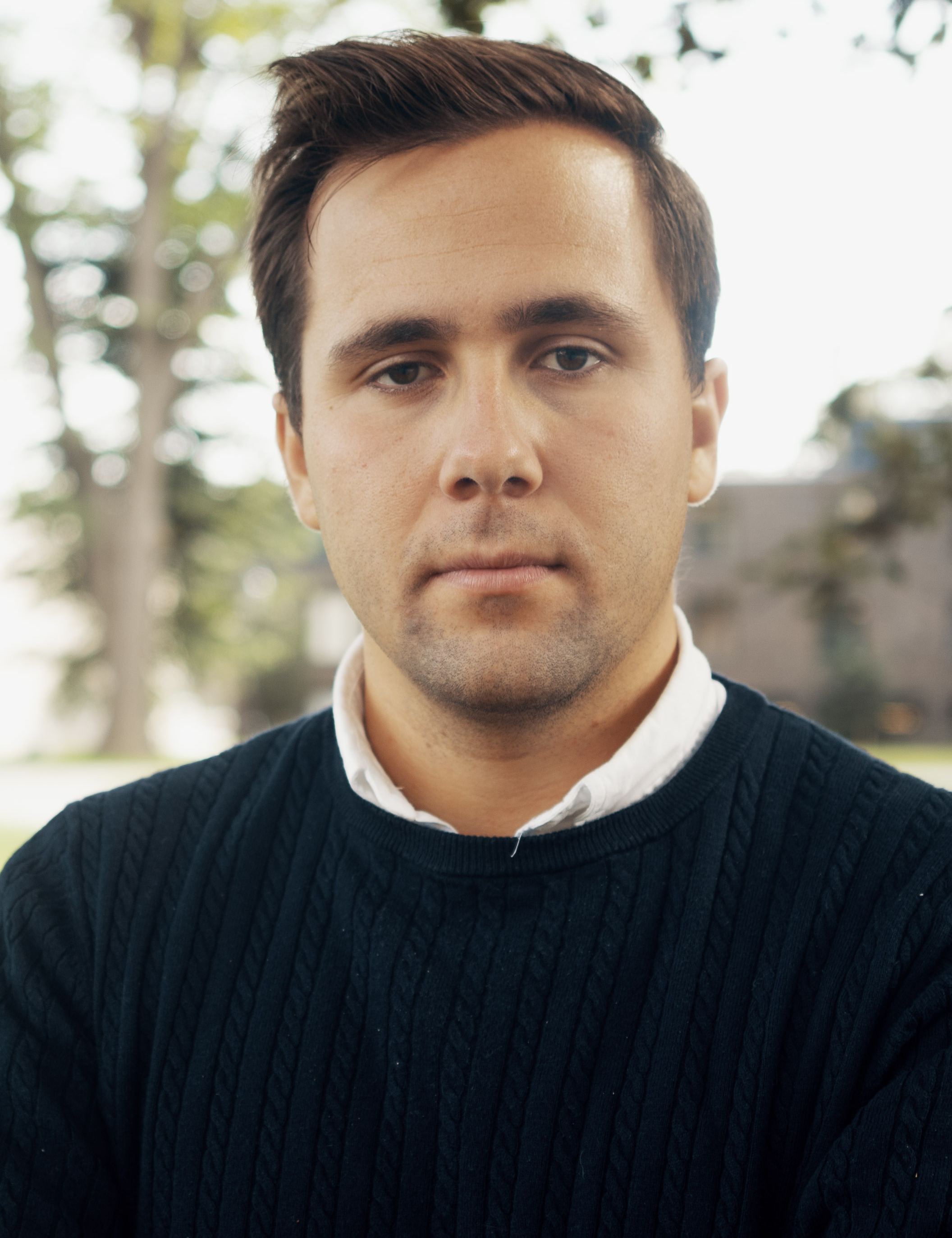
- Incumbent; Benjamin Dousa since 10 September 2024
- Ministry for Foreign Affairs
- Member of: The Government
- Appointer: The Prime Minister
- Term length: No fixed term; Serves as long as the Prime Minister sees fit
- Formation: 4 June 1958
- First holder: Ulla Lindström
- Salary: 1,452,000 SEK (annually)
- Website: www.sweden.gov.se

The Minister for International Development Cooperation and Foreign Trade (Swedish: Bistånds- och utrikeshandelsminister), previously Minister for International Development Co-operation (Swedish: Biståndsminister), is the cabinet minister in the Swedish Government responsible for foreign aid and global development. The cabinet minister is, like the rest of the Swedish Government, nominated and appointed by the Prime Minister of Sweden who in turn is appointed by the Swedish Riksdag. The cabinet minister belongs to the Ministry for Foreign Affairs.

The position was established in 1954 and the first officeholder was Ulla Lindström. Lindström is also the person who has served in this capacity during the longest time, 12 years. The current cabinet minister to hold the office is Benjamin Dousa, appointed on 10 September 2024.

== List of ministers ==
No.	Portrait	Minister	Took office	Left office	Time in office	Party	Prime Minister
1	Ulla Lindström	Ulla Lindström (1909–1999)	4 June 1954	31 December 1966	12 years, 210 days	Social Democrats	Tage Erlander (S)
2	Gertrud Sigurdsen	Gertrud Sigurdsen (1923–2015)	3 November 1973	8 October 1976	2 years, 340 days	Social Democrats	Olof Palme (S)
3	Ola Ullsten	Ola Ullsten (1931–2018)	8 October 1976	18 October 1978	2 years, 10 days	Liberals	Thorbjörn Fälldin (C)
4	Lena Hjelm-Wallén	Lena Hjelm-Wallén (born 1943)	17 October 1985	4 October 1991	5 years, 352 days	Social Democrats	Olof Palme (S) (1985 – 1986); Ingvar Carlsson (S) (1986 – 1991)
5	Alf Svensson	Alf Svensson (born 1938)	4 October 1991	7 October 1994	3 years, 3 days	Christian Democrats	Carl Bildt (M)
6	Pierre Schori	Pierre Schori (born 1938)	7 October 1994	11 June 1999	4 years, 247 days	Social Democrats	Ingvar Carlsson (S) (1994 – 1966); Göran Persson (S) (1996 – 1999)
7	Maj-Inger Klingvall	Maj-Inger Klingvall (born 1946)	14 September 1999	16 November 2001	2 years, 63 days	Social Democrats	Göran Persson (S)
8	Jan O. Karlsson	Jan O. Karlsson (1939–2016)	7 January 2002	9 October 2003	1 year, 275 days	Social Democrats	Göran Persson (S)
9	Carin Jämtin	Carin Jämtin (born 1964)	10 October 2003	6 October 2006	2 years, 361 days	Social Democrats	Göran Persson (S)
10	Gunilla Carlsson	Gunilla Carlsson (born 1963)	6 October 2006	17 September 2013	6 years, 346 days	Moderate	Fredrik Reinfeldt (M)
11	Hillevi Engström	Hillevi Engström (born 1963)	17 September 2013	3 October 2014	1 year, 16 days	Moderate	Fredrik Reinfeldt (M)
12	Isabella Lövin	Isabella Lövin (born 1963)	3 October 2014	21 January 2019	4 years, 110 days	Green	Stefan Löfven (S)
13	Peter Eriksson	Peter Eriksson (born 1958)	21 January 2019	17 December 2020	1 year, 331 days	Green	Stefan Löfven (S)
—	Isabella Lövin (acting)	Isabella Lövin (acting) (born 1963)	17 December 2020	5 February 2021	50 days	Green	Stefan Löfven (S)
14	Per Olsson Fridh	Per Olsson Fridh (born 1981)	5 February 2021	30 November 2021	298 days	Green	Stefan Löfven (S)
15	Matilda Ernkrans	Matilda Ernkrans (born 1973)	30 November 2021	18 October 2022	322 days	Social Democrats	Magdalena Andersson (S)
16	Johan Forssell	Johan Forssell (born 1973)	18 October 2022	10 September 2024	1 year, 328 days	Moderate	Ulf Kristersson (M)
17	Benjamin Dousa	Benjamin Dousa (born 1992)	10 September 2024	Incumbent	2 years, 55 days	Moderate	Ulf Kristersson (M)
