= Tove Lifvendahl =

Swedish politician and editor-in-chief

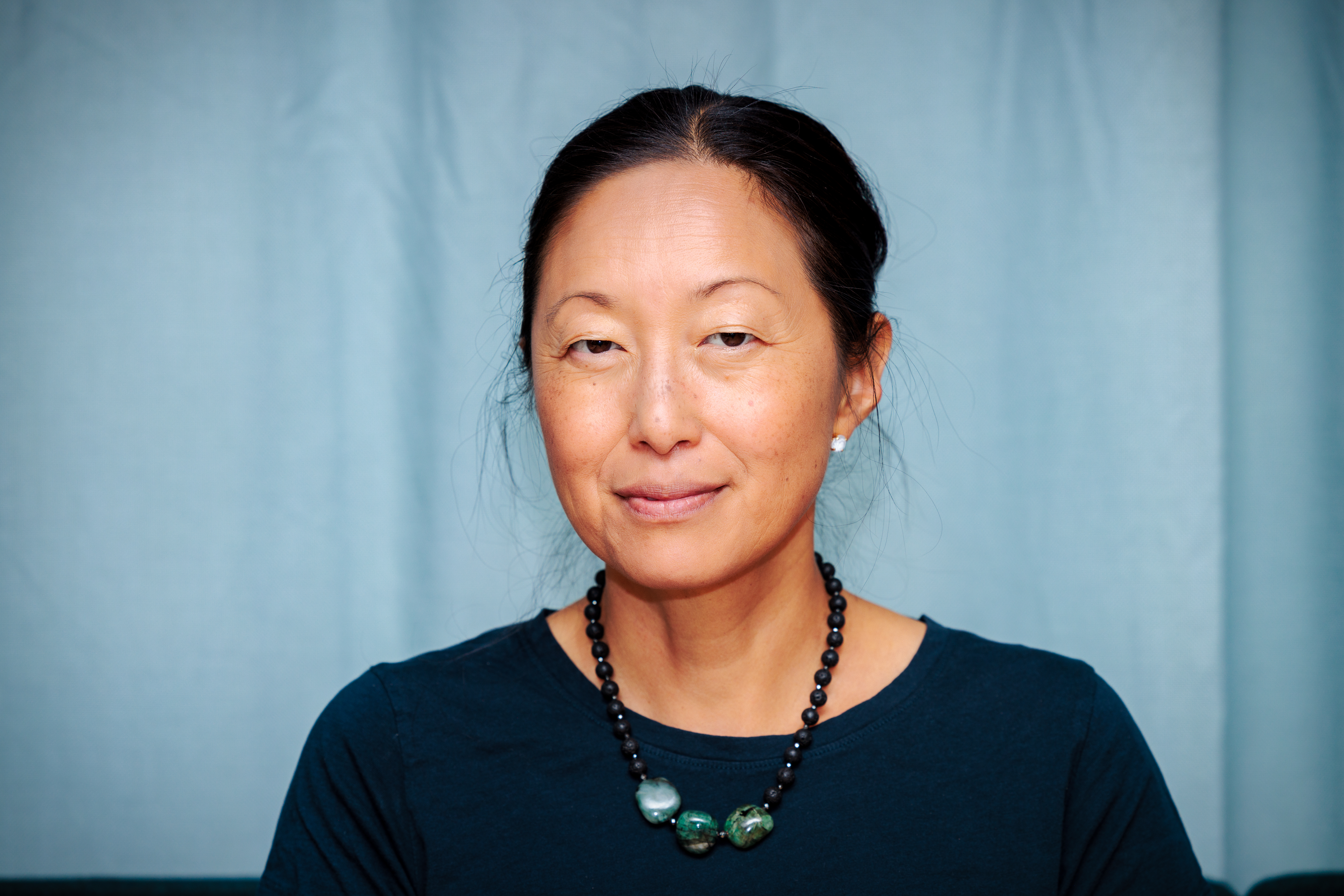
- Tove Lifvendahl in the Schibsted break room, Kungsbrohuset, Stockholm, August 2022.

Political Editor-in-Chief of Svenska Dagbladet
- Incumbent
- Assumed office 5 August 2013
- Preceded by: P.J. Anders Linder

Communications Director for the Confederation of Swedish Enterprise
- In office 23 December 2006 – 16 May 2012
- Preceded by: Ulla Hamilton
- Succeeded by: Tina Thorsell

Chairwomen of the Moderate Youth League
- In office 2000–2002
- Preceded by: Gunnar Strömmer
- Succeeded by: Christofer Fjellner

Personal details
- Born: 14 February 1974 Seoul, South Korea
- Party: Moderate Party
- Spouses: Andreas Lifvendahl (m. 1998; div. 2002) Fredrik Erixon (m. 2006)
- Occupation: Politician and Editor-in-chief

Tove Anna Helena Soo Hee Jensdotter Lifvendahl (née Holm; born 14 February 1974) is a Swedish politician, editor-in-chief, and author who served as Chairwomen of the Moderate Youth League from 2000 to 2002 and political editor-in-chief of Svenska Dagbladet since 2013.

== Early life ==
Lifvendahl was born on 14 February 1974 in Seoul, South Korea. She was adopted at an early age and grew up in Arbrå in Hälsingland. Her adopted parents were teacher Jens Holm and Ulla Holm (née Axelsson).

Lifvendahl attended senior secondary school both in Bollnäs and Gävle. In 1993, she enrolled at Uppsala University, studying literature, history and linguistics. Her undergraduate thesis in history on Gösta Bohman's intellectual legacy resulted in the book The Hero and the Myth.

== Political career ==
Lifvendahl became a member of the Moderate Youth League in 1987 and was later elected district chair for Gävleborg County. Lifvendahl was, as a district chair, also an ordinary member of the national board of the Moderate Youth League. In November 2000, Lifvendahl was elected national chair of the Moderate Youth League, the youth-wing of the Moderate Party. As chair of the Youth League, she became known for several high-profile statements, including her criticism of the Moderate Party's refugee policy, where she advocated for a significantly more liberal approach, as well as her proposal for privatized prison services. Lifvendahl served as chairperson from 2000 to 2002.

After the 2002 Swedish general election, where the Moderate Party saw the share of first-time voters decrease from 30% to 13%, Lifvendahl called for changes in the party's leadership. On the day of the election she called for older politicians to resign and make room for younger, more modern Moderates. This contributed to, among others, Per Unckel leaving front-line politics. However, the senior party leadership blamed the election loss partly on Lifvendahl, arguing that the Youth League's proposals had alienated voters. After Lifvendahl's resignation from MUF in 2002 she became the first Moderate Youth League chairman to be re-elected to the board of the party on her own mandate, a position she left in 2005. During the party congress of 2005 she opposed proposals for a more lenient view of trade unions. When she requested to be relieved of her duties she cited a desire to focus more deeply on some of the party's policy areas, which would leave her with insufficient time for the board position.

Lifvendahl has contributed to many publications, among them her own book on former Moderate leader Gösta Bohman.

== Media and Communications ==
In the spring of 2000, Lifvendahl became a columnist for Svenska Dagbladet and worked as a substitute editorial writer during the summer, writing opinion pieces on topics such as crime victims, the Swedish Agency for Youth and Civil Society, and the documentary Shocking Truth.

After stepping down as chair of the Moderate Youth League in 2002, she began working part-time as a communications consultant for the firm JKL in Stockholm.

In 2006, Lifvendahl returned as a substitute editorial writer for Svenska Dagbladet. From 2007 to 2012, she worked as Communications Director for the Confederation of Swedish Enterprise. On August 5, 2013, she began her role as Political Editor-in-Chief at Svenska Dagbladet.

== Associations ==
Lifvendahl has also served as a Senior Fellow at the think tank FORES.

Lifvendahl volunteered for several years with Stockholms Stadsmission and served as a member of its main board from July 2003 to June 2008. She has also been Vice Chair of Junior Achievement, a board member of the Swedish Taxpayers' Association and Swedes Worldwide (SWIV). Lifvendahl is also a member of the Trilateral Commission and a Member of the Commission's European Group.

== Literature ==
In February and March 2003, she lived in the Rosengård district of Malmö to gain a deeper understanding of the area. Her experience resulted in the book Vem kastar första stenen (English: Who Throws the First Stone). A follow-up book, I rörelse: Möten i Rosengård 10 år senare (English: In Motion: Encounters in Rosengård 10 Years Later), was published in 2013.
