= Gunilla Carlsson =

Swedish politician

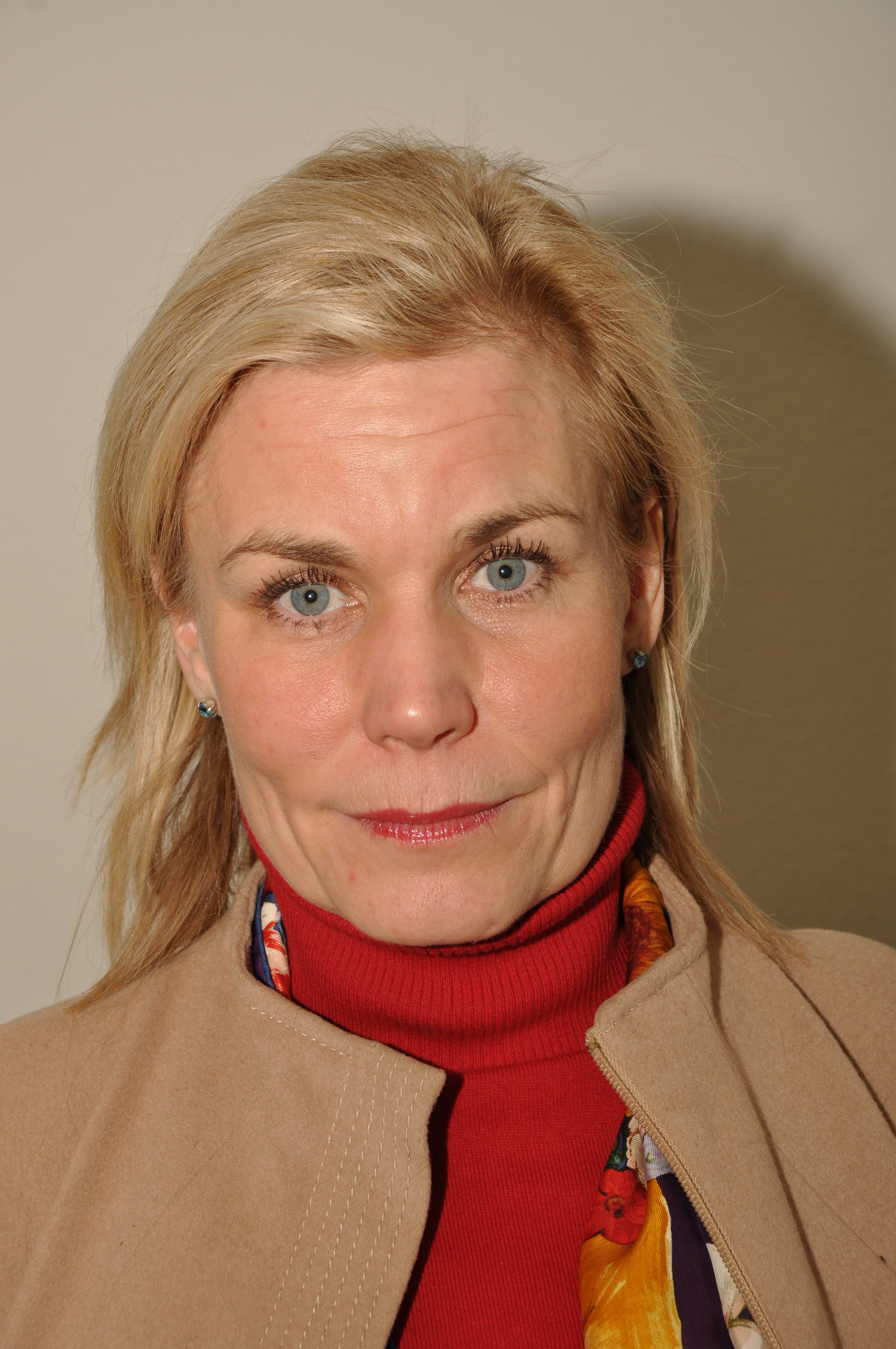
- Carlsson in 2011

Minister for International Development Cooperation
- In office 6 October 2006 – 17 September 2013
- Prime Minister: Fredrik Reinfeldt
- Preceded by: Carin Jämtin
- Succeeded by: Hillevi Engström

Member of the Riksdag
- In office 30 September 2002 – 5 October 2006
- Constituency: Värmland County

Personal details
- Born: Anna Gunilla Ottosson; 11 May 1963 (age 63) Lund, Sweden
- Party: Moderate Party
- Website: Official website Party website

Anna Gunilla Carlsson (born 11 May 1963) is a Swedish politician and a member of the Moderate Party. She served as Minister for International Development Cooperation from 2006 to 2013, member of the Swedish Riksdag from 2002 to 2013 and deputy chairman of her party from 2003 to 2015.

== Early life ==
Carlsson was born and raised in Lund in Skåne. She was at one time chairperson of the Moderate Youth League district in that county. At the Battle of Lycksele, when current party leader Fredrik Reinfeldt was elected chairman of the Youth League, Carlsson was elected vice chairman.

== Political career ==
=== Member of the European Parliament, 1995-2002 ===
After working as an auditor, Carlsson joined the Moderate Party office in 1994. In 1995, she was elected to the European Parliament and served until 2002. In parliament, she served on the Committee on Economic and Monetary Affairs and Industrial Policy (1995-1999) and on the Committee on Foreign Affairs, Human Rights, Common Security and Defence Policy (1999-2002). In addition to her committee assignments, she was vice-chair of the parliament's delegation to the European Economic Area Joint Parliamentary Committee (EEA) from 1995 until 1997.

=== Career in national politics ===
In the 2002 national elections, Carlsson was elected to the Riksdag for Stockholm. In 1999, she was elected vice chairman of the Moderate Party.

With the growing co-operation between the Swedish opposition parties, Carlsson was appointed to head the group co-ordinating foreign policy. This led to speculation about her being a possible candidate to the office of Minister for Foreign Affairs after Alliance for Sweden's victory in the 2006 election. With a number of the Moderate Party Riksdag members from Östergötland resigning, she decided to stand in her home county in 2006. While she won the internal primaries, she was only placed second on the list after Gunnar Axén, but comfortably reached re-election as the party went from three to four seats from the county. She continues to make her home in Tyresö outside Stockholm.

From 2007, Carlsson was a member of the World Bank Group’s High Level Advisory Council on Women's Economic Empowerment, which was chaired by Danny Leipziger and Heidemarie Wieczorek-Zeul.

In her capacity as minister, Carlsson also chaired the Stockholm-based Commission on Climate Change and Development (CCCD), a body made up of 13 international experts and established by the Swedish government in 2007 with the aim of looking at how countries can adapt to climate change. In its final report, the commission recommended in 2009 that poor countries already suffering from the impact of climate change urgently need up to $2 billion to help adjust and cope.

In September 2009, Carlsson led, together with Karel De Gucht, European Commissioner for Humanitarian Aid and Civil Protection, a delegation to Zimbabwe for discussions with President Robert Mugabe. This was to discuss the lifting of targeted EU sanctions against him and more than 200 of his political allies and related businesses. He and his Zanu-PF party have for years loudly argued that these measures are directly responsible for Zimbabwe's economic collapse. The EU team did not buy that argument, and would not even put the sanctions issue on the negotiating table at that time, according to a BBC report.

As the Swedish Riksdag convened after the summer on 17 September 2013, Prime Minister Fredrik Reinfeldt announced that Carlsson had submitted her resignation and he had accepted the resignation earlier that morning. Subsequently, she resigned her seat in the Swedish Riksdag.

== Career in international development ==
In her final year as minister from 2012 until 2013, Carlsson served – alongside Ellen Johnson Sirleaf, David Cameron and others – on the High-level Panel on Post-2015 Development Agenda, an advisory board established by United Nations Secretary-General Ban Ki-moon to develop the global development agenda beyond 2015, the target date for the Millennium Development Goals.

Following her resignation, Carlsson served alongside Tertius Zongo and Callisto Madavo on the African Development Bank’s three-member High Level Panel on Fragile States between 2013 and 2014, where she advised on strategies related to the Horn of Africa. Between 2013 and 2015, she was a member of the UNAIDS–Lancet Commission on Defeating AIDS, chaired by Joyce Banda, Nkosazana Dlamini Zuma and Peter Piot.

In 2017, United Nations Secretary-General António Guterres appointed Carlsson as the UNAIDS deputy executive director, management and governance, and Assistant Secretary-General of the United Nation. Following Michel Sidibé’s resignation, she briefly served as executive director ad interim from May until August 2019.

On 29 June 2023, the Government of Sweden appointed Carlsson as the new Chair of the Governing Board of the Swedish International Development Cooperation Agency (SIDA). She formally took up the position on 1 July 2023.

== Other activities ==
=== Corporate boards ===
- Tundra Fonder, Member of the Board of Directors (since 2017)
- Annexin Pharmaceuticals, Member of the Board of Directors
- NGS Group AB, Independent Member of the Board of Directors (since 2015)
- IFS AB, Independent Member of the Board of Directors (2015-2016)
- Internationella Engelska Skolan (IES), Member of the Board (2017-2019)

=== Non-profit organizations ===
- Africa Europe Foundation (AEF), Member of the High-Level Group of Personalities on Africa-Europe Relations (since 2020), co-chair of the Strategy Group on Health
- United Nations System Staff College (UNSSC), Member of the Board of Governors (since 2017)
- European Council on Foreign Relations (ECFR), Member
- GAVI Alliance, Member of the Board and of the Governance Committee
- Global Fund to Fight AIDS, Tuberculosis and Malaria, Non-voting Member of the Board
- Center for Global Development, Member of the European Advisory Group

Party political offices
Preceded by Gun Hellsvik	Second Deputy Chairperson of the Moderate Party; 1999–2003	Succeeded by Kristina Axén Olin
Preceded by Chris Heister	First Deputy Chairperson of the Moderate Party; 2003–2015	Succeeded by Peter Danielsson
Political offices
Preceded by Carin Jämtin	Minister for International Development Cooperation; 2006–2013	Succeeded by Hillevi Engström
