= Johan Forssell (politician, born 1979) =

Swedish politician (born 1979)

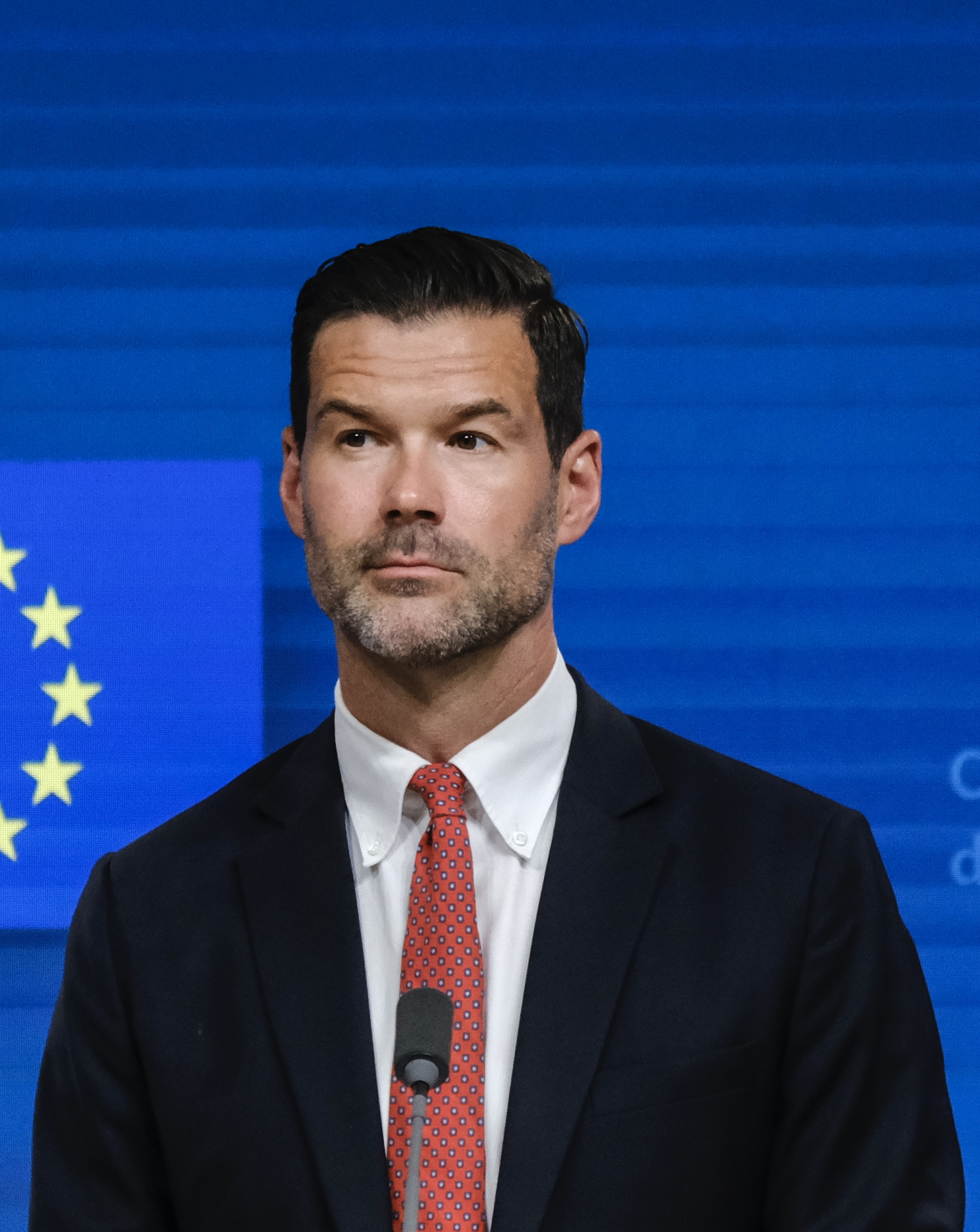
- Forssell in 2023

Minister for Migration and Asylum Policy
- Incumbent
- Assumed office 10 September 2024
- Monarch: Carl XVI Gustaf
- Prime Minister: Ulf Kristersson
- Preceded by: Maria Malmer Stenergard

Minister for Foreign Trade and International Development Cooperation
- In office 18 October 2022 – 10 September 2024
- Prime Minister: Ulf Kristersson
- Preceded by: Anna Hallberg (Foreign Trade); Matilda Ernkrans (International Development Cooperation)
- Succeeded by: Benjamin Dousa

Member of the Riksdag
- Incumbent
- Assumed office 4 October 2010
- Constituency: Stockholm Municipality

Personal details
- Born: 8 December 1979 (age 46) Stockholm, Sweden
- Party: Moderate
- Spouse: Kristine Forssell
- Children: 4
- Education: Stockholm School of Economics; London School of Economics; Otago School of Business

Carl Johan Henrik Forssell (born 8 December 1979) is a Swedish politician of the Moderate Party. He has served as Minister for Migration and Asylum Policy in the cabinet of Ulf Kristersson since 10 September 2024, having served as Minister for Foreign Trade and International Development Cooperation prior to that. and has been Member of the Riksdag since the 2010 general election, representing Stockholm Municipality. He was chairman of the Moderate Youth League, the youth wing of the Moderate Party, from 2004 to 2006.

== Personal life and education ==
Johan Forssell was born in Stockholm but he grew up in Örebro. He has a Master of Business and Economics degree from the Stockholm School of Economics. He did his military service with the Arctic Rangers at K 4 in Arvidsjaur.

== Political career ==
Forssell joined the Moderate Youth League (Swedish: Moderata ungdomsförbundet) in 1992. He served as chairman of the Moderate School Youth from 1998 to 1999 and was elected as member of the board of the Moderate Youth League in 2000. He was elected as new chairman of the Moderate Youth League on 20 November 2004, following the resignation of Christofer Fjellner. He served on this post until 25 November 2006, when he was succeeded by Niklas Wykman.

In the general election held on 17 September 2006, Forssell was elected a member of the Riksdag. As the new cabinet was announced on 6 October, Forssell was appointed as Chief of Staff to Prime Minister Fredrik Reinfeldt. He left his place in the Riksdag following his new appointment.

In September 2007, Forssell resigned from the position of Chief of Staff and become the Moderate Partys planning manager for the 2010 general election. Following the 2010 election, he returned to the Riksdag where he serves as member of the Defence Committee.

In October 2022 he was appointed as Minister for Foreign Trade and International Development Cooperation in the cabinet of Ulf Kristersson. Forssell stated the government would scrap the goal that at least 1% of GDP would be used in foreign aid, the goal being to prioritize the quality of the aid sent and spend more money internally in Sweden.

In January 2024, while serving as Minister for International Development Cooperation, Forssell announced that Sweden would suspend its humanitarian funding to the United Nations Relief and Works Agency for Palestine Refugees in the Near East (UNRWA) amidst the ongoing war in Gaza, following allegations that several employees had links to Hamas. He stated that the funds would instead be temporarily redirected to other humanitarian organizations operating in the region. In March 2024, Forssell announced that funding would resume after UNRWA agreed to stricter oversight measures, increased transparency, and written guarantees regarding anti-terrorism controls.

In September 2024 Ulf Kristersson reshuffled his cabinet and Migration Minister Maria Malmer Stenergard was made the new Minister for Foreign Affairs. Forssell was appointed to replace her as Minister for Migration and Asylum Policy. He stated that he intended to keep with Stenergard's policies and maintain Sweden's lowest immigration numbers of the 21st century, as achieved under his predecessor.

In June 2026, during a meeting of the European Union's Justice and Home Affairs Council, Forssell noted "strong support" among member states for a proposal to alter the Temporary Protection Directive, an EU emergency mechanism that grants immediate collective protection to displaced persons. He voiced support for the initiative, arguing that restricting automatic residency rights for newly arriving Ukrainian men aged 23 to 60 was necessary to avoid undermining Kyiv's mobilization capacity amidst the Ukrainian conscription crisis, which saw tens of thousands of individuals flee the country to evade forced conscription following the 2022 Russian invasion of Ukraine.

== Controversies ==
=== Exposure of son's far-right activities ===
In July 2025, it emerged that Forssell’s teenage son had been involved in far-right extremist circles. According to Expo, he had participated in activities organised by Aktivklubb Sverige, a network linked to white nationalist and fascist ideologies, and had attempted to recruit others to Det fria Sverige, a nationalist organisation advocating for an ethnically defined Swedish nation. He had also been in contact with the Nordic Resistance Movement (NMR), a neo-Nazi group designated as a terrorist organisation by the United States. The Swedish Security Service (SÄPO) informed Forssell of his son’s involvement, which had reportedly ended and did not result in any criminal suspicion. Forssell vowed to stay on as minister; however the incident prompted criticism from opposition parties and led to him being called before the Riksdag's Committee on Social Insurance.

== Other activities ==
- World Bank, Ex-Officio Alternate Member of the Board of Governors (since 2022)

== Honours ==
- Estonia: Order of the Cross of Terra Mariana, 1st Class (2 May 2023)

Party political offices
Preceded by Christofer Fjellner	Chairman of the Moderate Youth League; 2004–2006	Succeeded by Niklas Wykman
Political offices
Preceded by Anna Hallberg	Minister for Foreign Trade; 2022–2024	Succeeded by Benjamin Dousa
Preceded by Matilda Ernkrans	Minister for International Development Cooperation; 2022–2024	Succeeded by Benjamin Dousa
Preceded by Maria Malmer Stenergard	Minister for Migration and Asylum Policy; 2024–	Incumbent
