= Thomas Idergard =

Lars Thomas Idergard (born 1 March 1969) is a Swedish Catholic priest, Jesuit, and former politician and public affairs executive. A former member of the Moderate Party, he served as chairman of the Moderate Youth League (Moderata ungdomsförbundet) from 1995 to 1998 before leaving party politics. In 2017, he was ordained a priest in the Society of Jesus (Jesuits) and currently serves at Saint Eugenia Church in Stockholm.

== Early life and political career ==
Idergard was born in Arvidsjaur, Sweden, into a working-class Pentecostal family. He developed an early interest in liturgy through his Lutheran pastor uncle (who later became a Catholic priest).

At age 13, Idergard joined the Moderate Youth League. He progressed rapidly within the organization and became the elected regional chairman at 17, he later joined the national board at 19 and at 21 was elected national vice chairman. After studying political science and sociology at university, he moved to Stockholm in 1991 to work as a speechwriter and junior adviser to the Minister for Industry and Commerce in the center-right coalition government.

In 1995, at age 26, Idergard was elected national chairman of the Moderate Youth League. Along with contemporaries such as Ulf Kristersson and Fredrik Reinfeldt, he was viewed as a rising star and potential future leader of the Moderate Party. However, in 1998, he unexpectedly resigned from the post and stepped away from elective politics, later being cited as part of the Moderate Party's "Lost Generation."

== Conversion to Catholicism ==
His exploration of Catholic theology began in 2007 after reading the Catechism of the Catholic Church obtained from the bookshop at Saint Eugenia Parish in Stockholm.

In 2009, he became a Roman Catholic. Seeking a deeper religious vocation, he stepped away from his public career and entered the novitiate of the Society of Jesus in Nuremberg, Germany, in the autumn of 2012, taking his first vows in 2014. He was ordained a deacon in London in February 2017 and was subsequently ordained a priest on September 30, 2017, by Cardinal Anders Arborelius OCD at Saint Eugenia Church in Stockholm.

Father Idergard joined the pastoral staff at Saint Eugenia and later served as parish priest (kyrkoherde) at Saint Lars Catholic Parish in Uppsala from 2024 to 2025. In addition to his parish ministry, he serves as chairman of the Justice and Peace Commission for the Catholic Diocese of Stockholm.

Party political offices
Preceded by Fredrik Reinfeldt	Moderate Youth League federation's chairmen 1995–1998	Succeeded by Gunnar Strömmer
