= Douglas Thor =

Swedish politician

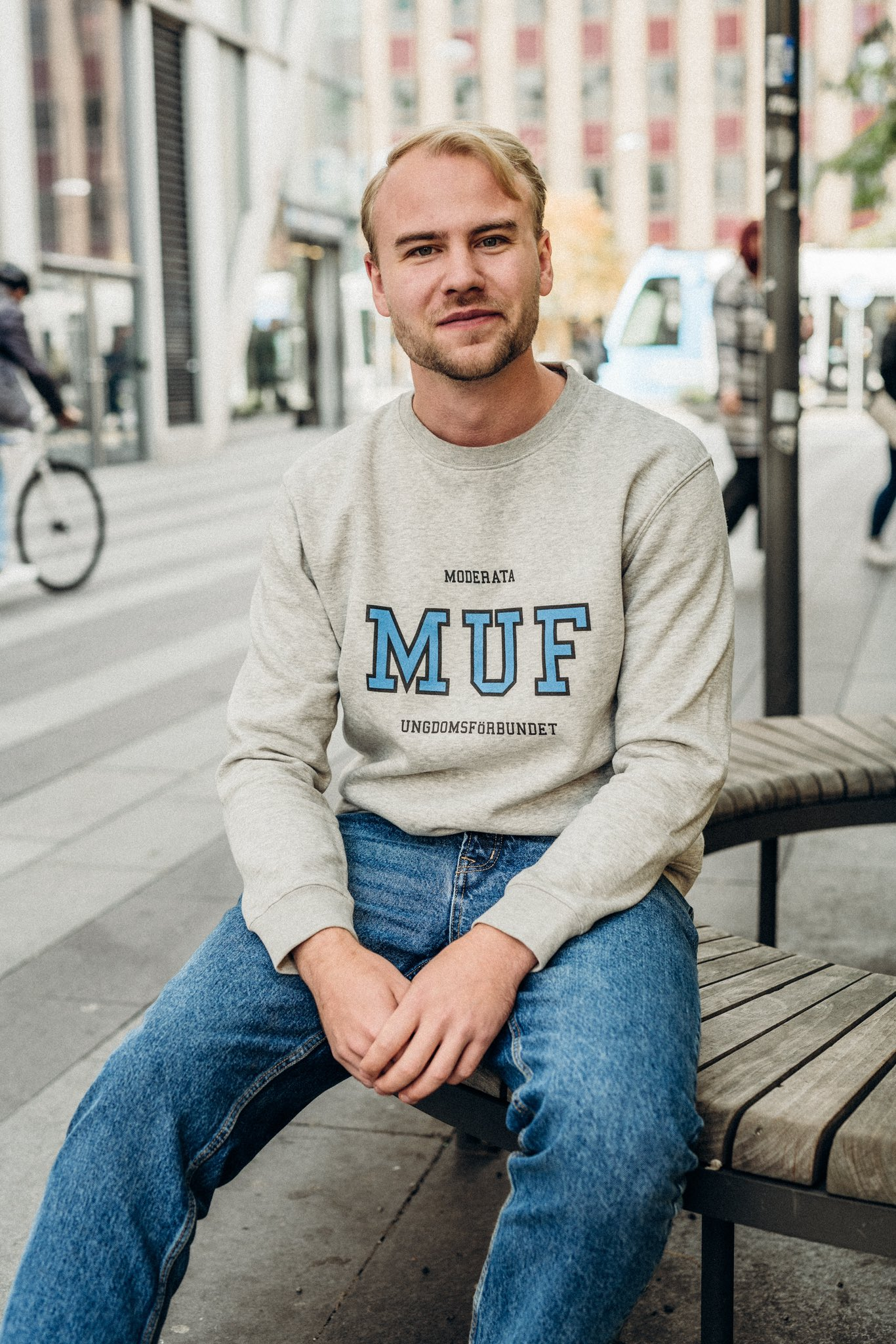

Chairman of the Moderate Youth League
- Incumbent
- Assumed office 26 November 2022
- Preceded by: Matilda Ekeblad

Personal details
- Born: 11 December 1997 (age 28) Nävelsjö (outside Vetlanda), Jönköping County, Sweden
- Education: Uppsala University

Douglas Verner Thor (born 11 December 1997) is a Swedish politician of the Moderate Party. He has been national chairman of the Moderate Youth League since 2022.

== Life and career ==
Thor was born on 11 December 1997 in Nävelsjö (outside Vetlanda) in Jönköping County, Sweden.

Thor was district chairman of the Moderate Youth League in Jönköping County from 2018 to 2021 and national chairman of the Moderate Students from 2021 to 2022. He was member of the municipal council in Vetlanda Municipality from October 2018 to May 2020, when he resigned to begin studies at Uppsala University.

During the youth leagues congress in November 2022, Thor challenged incumbent Matilda Ekeblad as chairman of the Moderate Youth League and won with the votes 52–49.

In March 2023, Thor received negative publicity for having tried to influence the election of a district chairman in Jämtland County by suggesting that existing members could pay for new members' membership fees; his preferred candidate did not win. The Moderate Party's investigation stated that although Thor's action had been very bad, no new members could be linked to this occasion.

Political offices
Preceded by Matilda Ekeblad	Chairman of the Moderate Youth League; 2022–	Incumbent
