= Gunnar Axén =

Swedish politician (born 1967)

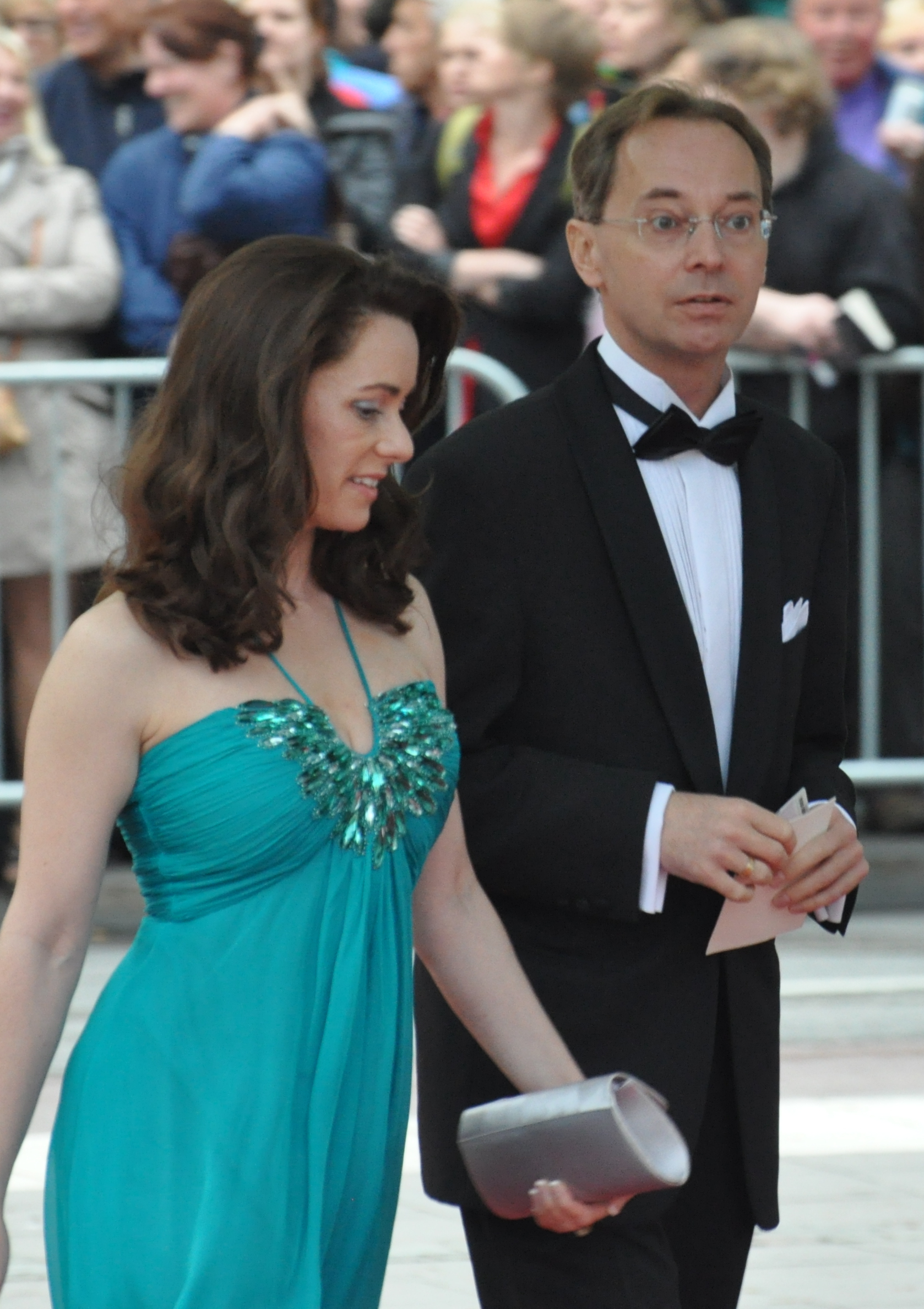
Anna Nyholm and Gunnar Axén, 2010

Hans Gunnar Axén (born 9 July 1967) is a Swedish Moderate Party politician and a member of the Swedish Riksdag for Östergötland from 1998 to 2014.

Born and raised in Norrköping, he was at one time the chairman of the local Moderate Youth League district. He still actively supports the Moderate Youth League in Östergötland, which has made him rather popular among young Moderate Party members. He was a PR consultant before being elected to the Riksdag in 1998. He is known for his liberalism and was one of the few in the Moderate Party who voted for adoption rights for homosexuals. He managed to beat Gunilla Carlsson to the number one spot on the Moderate Party list in Östergötland for the Riksdag election in 2006.
