= Gunnar Strömmer =

Swedish politician (born 1972)

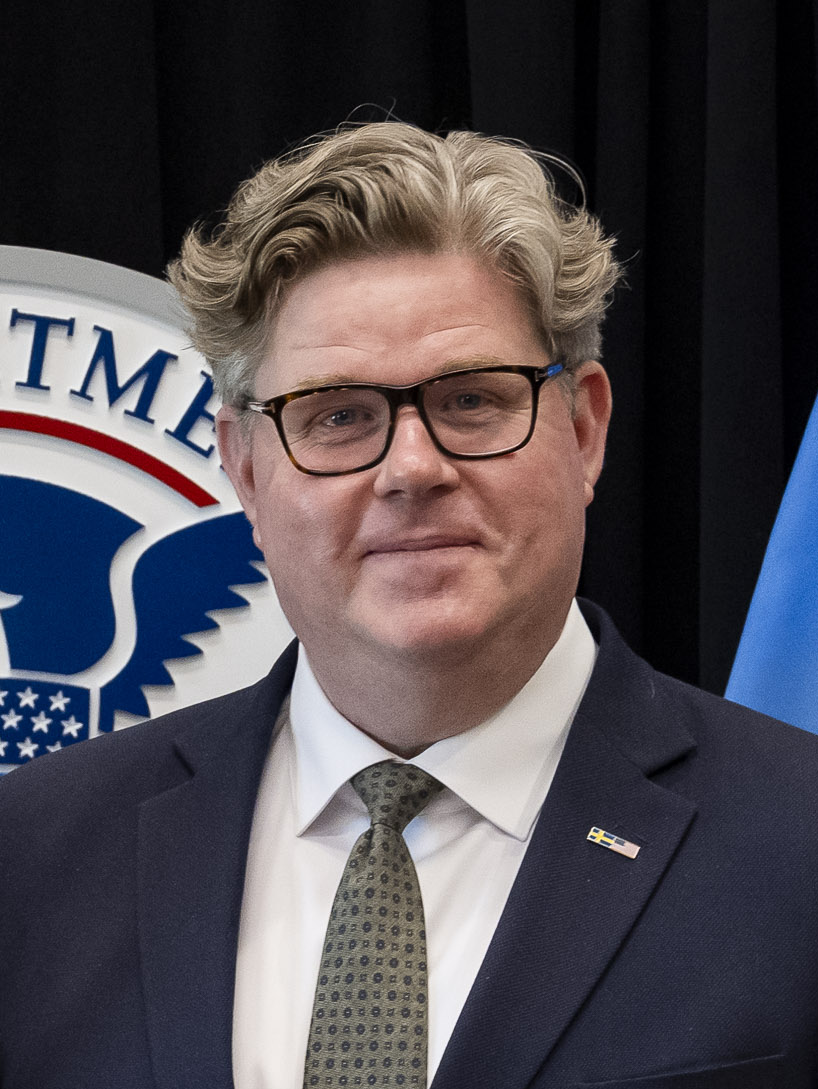
- Strömmer in 2024

Minister for Justice
- Incumbent
- Assumed office 18 October 2022
- Monarch: Carl XVI Gustaf
- Prime Minister: Ulf Kristersson
- Preceded by: Morgan Johansson

Secretary-General of the Moderate Party
- In office 12 October 2017 – 19 October 2022
- Leader: Ulf Kristersson
- Preceded by: Anders Edholm
- Succeeded by: Karin Enström

Chairman of the Moderate Youth League
- In office 3 January 1998 – 15 November 2000
- Preceded by: Thomas Idergard
- Succeeded by: Tove Lifvendahl

Personal details
- Born: Gunnar Sören Folke Strömmer; 19 September 1972 (age 54) Örnsköldsvik, Sweden
- Party: Moderate
- Spouse: Irene Beertema (m. 2006)
- Children: 3
- Education: Uppsala University

Gunnar Sören Folke Strömmer (born 19 September 1972) is a Swedish politician serving as Minister for Justice since 2022. A member of the Moderate Party, he was previously Party Secretary from 2017 to 2022. He also served as Chairman of the Moderate Youth League from 1998 to 2000.

A lawyer by profession, Strömmer served as a member of the executive board of the Moderate Party from 2015 to 2017, and as a party secretary in 2017-2022. Prior to that, he worked as a lawyer at the Gernandt & Danielsson law firm in Stockholm, and as manager of the non-profit Centrum för rättvisa.

In 2013, he was named "Swede of the Year" by the Fokus magazine.

== Honours and decorations ==
Sweden:

- 15 September 2023: Recipient of the Commemorative Golden Jubilee Medal of His Majesty The King.

Party political offices
| Preceded by Thomas Idergard | Chairman of the Moderate Youth League; 1998–2000 | Succeeded by Tove Lifvendahl |
| Preceded by Anders Edholm | Secretary-General of the Moderate Party; 2017–2022 | Succeeded by Karin Enström |
Political offices
| Preceded by Morgan Johansson | Minister for Justice; 2022– | Incumbent |
