= Battle of Lycksele =

Swedish political contest

The Battle of Lycksele (Swedish: Slaget i Lycksele) is the name given to the Congress of the Moderate Youth League, the youth of the Swedish Moderate Party, in 1992, set in Lycksele in Lapland. The battle was between the incumbent chairman Ulf Kristersson and Fredrik Reinfeldt, where the former were defeated by latter. The two went on to become both Leader of the Moderate Party (in 2017 and 2003 respectively) and Prime Minister of Sweden (in 2022 and 2006 respectively).

It was the culmination of years of ideological conflict between conservatives and liberals within the Moderate Youth League. The Congress saw Fredrik Reinfeldt, later Prime Minister of Sweden and leader of the Moderate Party, beat the incumbent chairman Ulf Kristersson in a highly controversial election. Reinfeldt received 58 votes, while Kristersson received 55. Kristersson was a representative of the liberal faction of the Moderate Youth League while Reinfeldt became the icon of the Conservatives. Gunilla Carlsson, later Minister for Development Cooperation and deputy chairman of the Moderate Party, was elected vice chairman at the same time.

Then Prime Minister of Sweden and leader of the Moderate Party, Carl Bildt, was also present and tried to calm down tensions between the two factions.

Because the Conservatives won in Lycksele the following years saw an increase of Conservative power in the Moderate Youth League. Kristersson went into private sector after the battle but later returned to politics. In 2010 Kristersson became Minister for Social Security in the incumbent Cabinet of Fredrik Reinfeldt. Reinfeldt was elected leader of the party in 2003 and served as Prime Minister between 2006 and 2014. Kristersson has since become the leader of the Moderate Party in October 2017 and Prime Minister in October 2022.
