= Anders Edholm =

Swedish politician

Party secretary of the Moderate Party
- In office 2 June 2017 – 12 October 2017 (Acting: 2 June 2017–7 July 2017)
- Party chairman: Anna Kinberg Batra
- Preceded by: Tomas Tobé
- Succeeded by: Gunnar Strömmer

Personal details
- Born: 30 January 1970 (age 56) Västerås, Sweden
- Party: Moderate Party

Anders Olof Edholm (born 30 January 1970) is a Swedish politician who served as party secretary of the Moderate Party from 2 June 2017 to 12 October 2017, when he returned to the position of deputy party secretary.

Edholm worked as political advisor within the European Parliament from 1995 to 1996, having served as campaign leader of the Yes to Europe organization prior to the 1994 European Union membership referendum. The referendum resulted in the 'Yes' vote. Edholm was employed at Electrolux from 1997 to 2011 in a number of different roles, beginning as VP Group Internet Communications, later as VP Communications for Asia-Pacific, the Middle East and Latin America and as VP Media Relations and Issues Management and finally as SVP Corporate Communications. From 2011 to 2017, he was employed at the Confederation of Swedish Enterprise as Head of Regional Affairs.

In April 2017, Edholm was appointed deputy party secretary of the Moderate Party. He became acting party secretary on 2 June 2017 and was appointed party secretary on 7 July 2017. On 12 October 2017 he was returned to his former position as deputy party secretary.

Edholm returned to the Confederation of Swedish Enterprise on March 1, 2019, as head of the organisation's EU office in Brussels. Since February 1, 2021, he is Senior Vice President Communications at SCA, Europe's largest private forest owner and manufacturer of wood products, pulp, containerboard and renewable energy.
