= Torgil von Seth =

Swedish politician

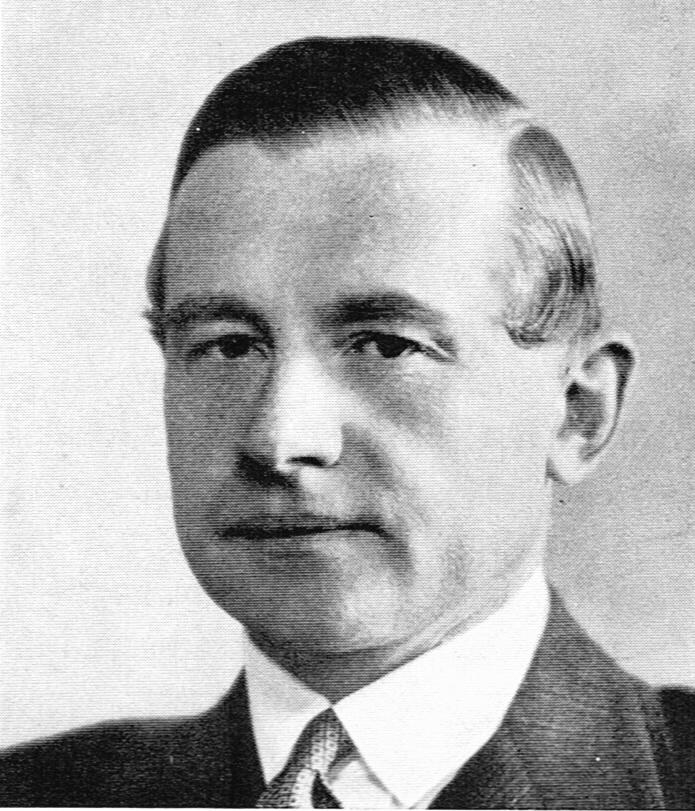

Chairman of the Young Swedes
- In office 1934–1941

Personal details
- Born: 3 October 1895
- Died: 21 January 1989 (aged 93)

Count Torgil Gabriel Alexander von Seth (3 October 1895 in Jönköping – 21 January 1989 in Vaggeryd) was a Swedish right-wing politician and the first chairman of what later became the Moderate Youth League.

The early 1930s saw conflict within the Swedish right wing over how to address nazism. In 1934, Arvid Lindman, the leader of the Moderate Party, declared that the National Youth League of Sweden (Sveriges nationella ungdomsförbund, SNU) no longer was considered the official youth organisation of the Swedish right due to its pro-Nazi stance. Torgil von Seth, one of the leaders of the democratic wing of SNU, quickly organised a committee to set up a new youth organisation. It was named the Young Swedes (Ungsvenskarna) and von Seth became its first chairman. He served until 1941, a period which among other things saw the Young Swedes involving itself in the nationwide efforts to help Finland after having been invaded by the Soviet Union.

He was honorary guest at the congress of the Moderate Youth League when Beatrice Ask was elected in 1984.
