= Matilda Ekeblad =

Swedish politician (born 1996)

- Ekeblad in 2020

Member of the Riksdag
- Incumbent
- Assumed office 28 September 2026
- Constituency: Östergötland County

Personal details
- Born: 21 April 1996 (age 30)
- Party: Moderate Party

Matilda Ekeblad (born 21 April 1996) is a Swedish politician who was elected member of the Riksdag in 2026. From 2020 to 2022, she served as chairwoman of the Moderate Youth League.
