= Per Unckel =

Swedish politician (1948–2011)

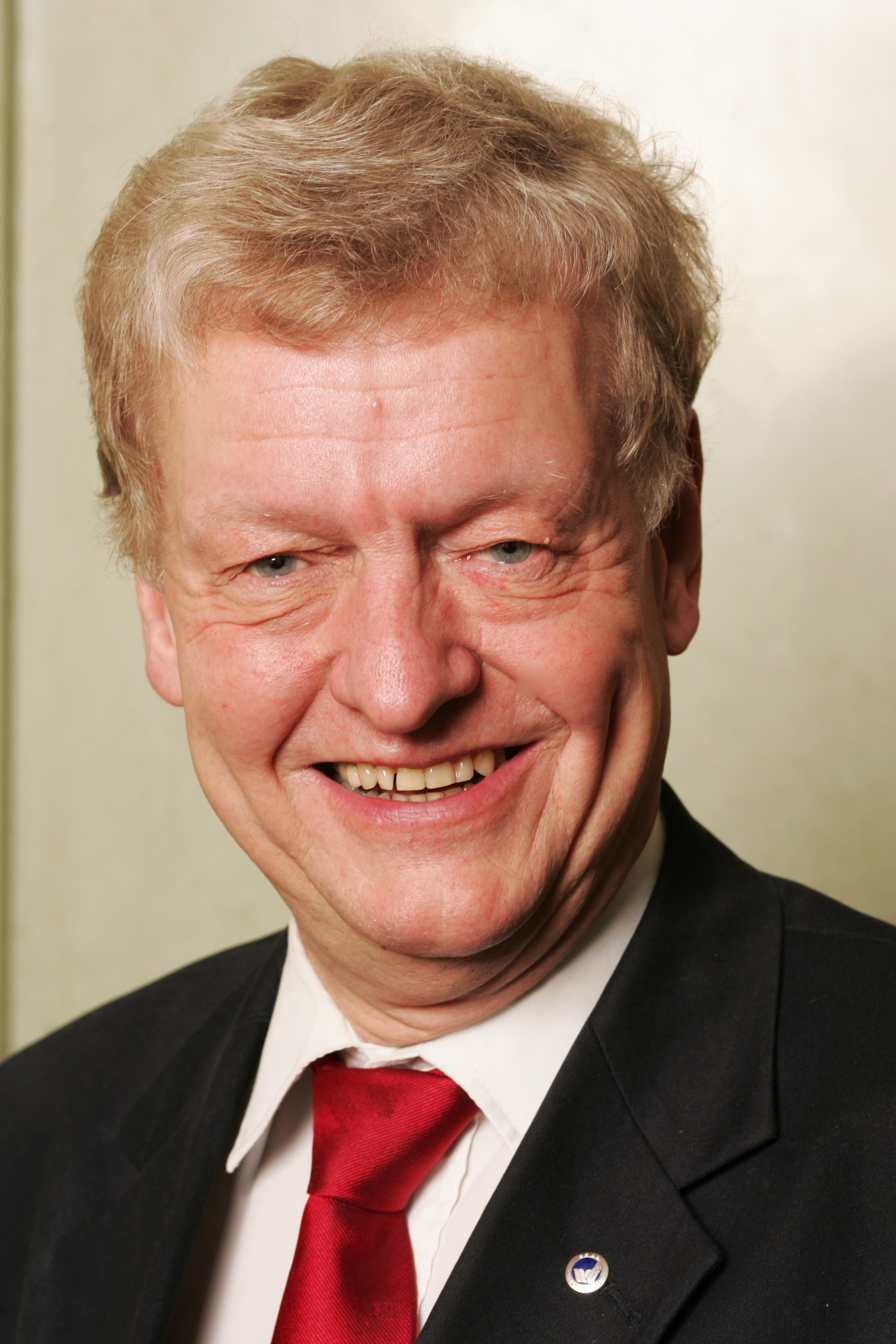

Minister for Education
- In office 4 October 1991 – 7 October 1994
- Monarch: Carl XVI Gustaf
- Prime Minister: Carl Bildt
- Preceded by: Bengt Göransson
- Succeeded by: Carl Tham

Governor of Stockholm County
- In office 2007 – 20 September 2011
- Preceded by: Mats Hellström
- Succeeded by: Katarina Kämpe (temporary, after Unckel's death); Chris Heister (since 1 February 2012)

Secretary General for the Nordic Council of Ministers
- In office 2003–2006
- Preceded by: Søren Christensen
- Succeeded by: Halldór Ásgrímsson

Personal details
- Born: 24 February 1948 Finspång, Sweden
- Died: 20 September 2011 (aged 63) Stockholm, Sweden
- Party: Moderate
- Spouse: Titti Unckel
- Children: 2

Per Carl Gustav Unckel (24 February 1948 – 20 September 2011) was a Swedish Moderate Party politician who served as Minister for Education from 1991 to 1994 and as Governor of Stockholm County from 2007 until his death in 2011.

He was born in Östergötland and was at one time chairman of the Moderate Youth League district there. He studied law in Uppsala 1968–71. In 1971, he was elected national chairman of the Moderate Youth League and served until 1976, when he was elected to the Riksdag for Östergötland.

In 1986, he became secretary general of the Moderate Party. He stayed in the post until 1991, when the Moderate Party won the election and Carl Bildt became Prime Minister of Sweden. Unckel was then appointed Minister of Education. In that position, he spearheaded the educational reforms that revolutionised the Swedish education system. Among other things, students were allowed to choose among the local schools.

After the loss in the election in 1994, Unckel became the party spokesman on labour policy. In 1998 he became chairman of the Committee on the Constitution and one year later he was appointed leader of the Moderate Party parliamentary group.

The election in 2002 was disastrous for the Moderate Party and several senior figures had to resign from the board of the party. Per Unckel was one of them. He was seen as a part of the old regime – the so-called "Bunker" around Carl Bildt, together with the likes of Anders Björk and Gunnar Hökmark. His old Moderate Youth League district, however, paid their respects by electing him honorary chairman. In 2003, he was appointed secretary-general of the Nordic Council of Ministers and retired from Swedish politics. He served until December 2006. He later served as the Chairman of the Governing Board of the European Humanities University.

Unckel died on 20 September 2011 from cancer, aged 63.
