= Annexin Pharmaceuticals =

Swedish pharmaceutical company

Annexin Pharmaceuticals is a Swedish privately held biotech company developing new therapeutic approaches for inflammatory cardiovascular diseases. The concept for the therapy is based on the anti-inflammatory properties of Annexin A5, a body own protective protein that acts simultaneously against several key pathogenic mechanisms of cardiovascular diseases. The company is currently focusing on treatment of peripheral artery disease (PAD).
