= Christofer Fjellner =

Swedish politician

Christofer Fjellner MEP
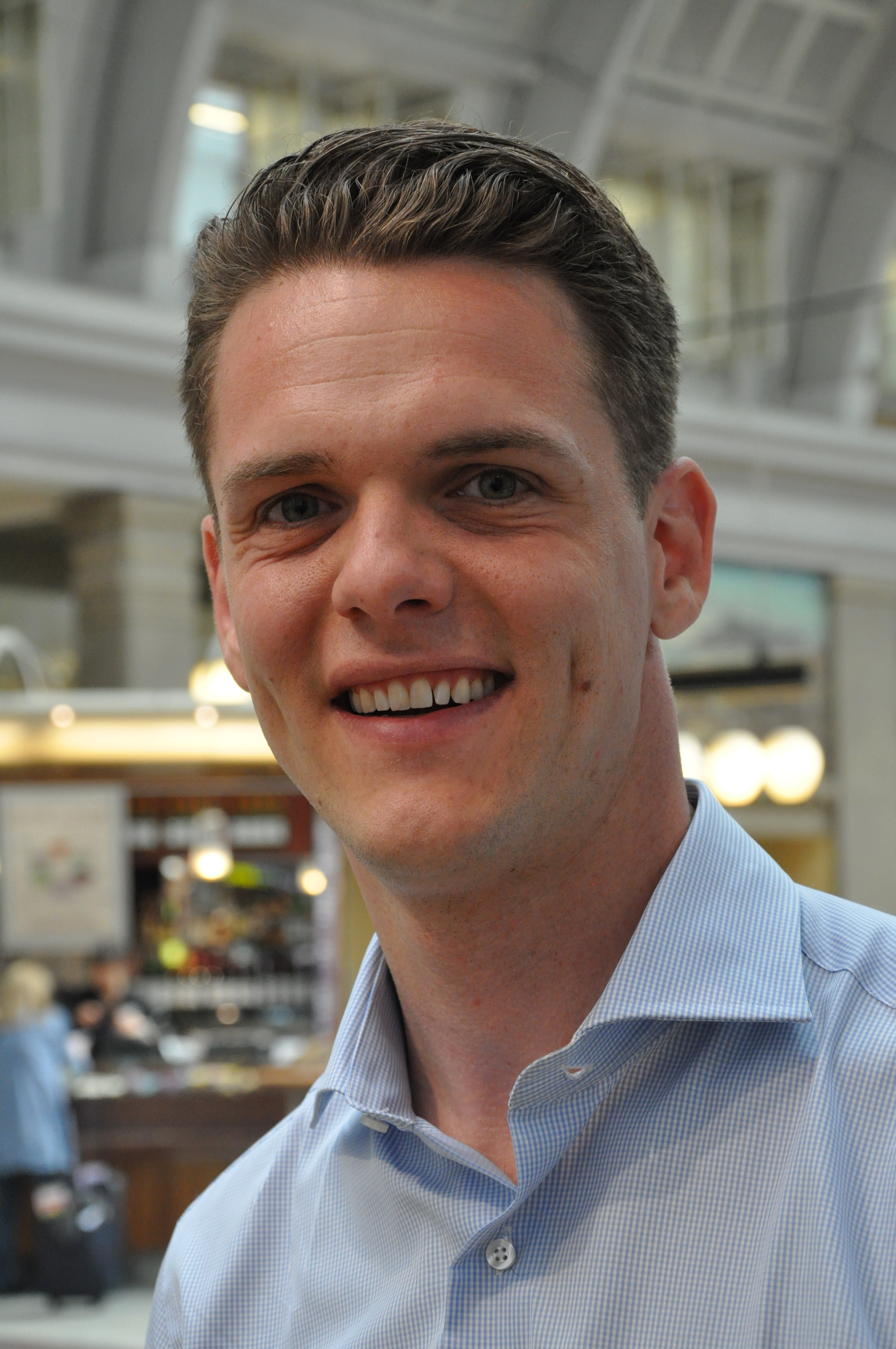

Member of the European Parliament
- In office 2004–2019
- Constituency: Sweden

Personal details
- Born: Gustav Christofer Ingemar Fjellner; 13 December 1976 (age 49) Västerås, Sweden
- Party: Swedish; Moderate Party; EU; European People's Party
- Education: Lund University; Uppsala University
- Website: www.fjellner.eu

Gustav Christofer Ingemar Fjellner (born 13 December 1976) is a Swedish politician who served as a Member of the European Parliament (MEP) from 2004 until 2019. He is a member of the Moderate Party, part of the European People's Party. Fjellner gained national prominence as chairman of the Moderate Youth League from 2002 to 2004.

Fjellner served on the European Parliament's Committee on International Trade and its Committee on Budgetary Control. In that capacity, he drafted the Parliament's review of EU spending in 2010. He was also a substitute for the Committee on the Environment, Public Health and Food Safety, a member of the delegation for relations with Belarus, and a substitute for the delegation for relations with Iran.

In September 2016, Fjellner joined more than 50 MEPs from six different political groups – including Ashley Fox, Alojz Peterle, Vicky Ford and Beatrix von Storch – in signing a proposal for a two-term limit of the President of the European Parliament. This move was widely seen as an effort to prevent incumbent Martin Schulz from holding onto the presidency for a third consecutive term.

== Career ==
- Studied political science and public finance, Uppsala University and Lund University
- Researcher, Timbro (free-market think tank), 1997
- Information officer, Svenska arbetsgivare föreningen (Swedish employers association), 1998–2000
- Editorial writer, Svenska Dagbladet, 1999
- Consultant, sagt:gjort (public relations firm), 2001
- Vice-President and co-founder of Look Closer AB (business intelligence company)
- Chairman, Moderate Youth League, 2002–2004
- President, Nordisk Ungkonservativ Union (Nordic Young Conservatives), 2002–2004
- Member of executive board, Moderaterna Swedish Conservatives)
- Member of Enköping Municipal Council, 1998-2002
- Member of Uppsala County Council, 1998-2002
