= Moderate Youth League =

Political youth organization in Sweden

Swedish Young Conservatives Moderata ungdomsförbundet
- Chairperson: Douglas Thor
- Secretary General: Carl Hedenbergh
- Founded: 1934; 92 years ago
- Preceded by: National League of Sweden
- Headquarters: Blasieholmsgatan 4A, Stockholm, Sweden
- Membership: 35,000 (2026)
- Ideology: Liberal conservatism Libertarian conservatism Libertarianism; Classical liberalism Economic liberalism
- Mother party: Moderate
- International affiliation: International Young Democrat Union (IYDU)
- European affiliation: Youth of the European People's Party (YEPP)
- Nordic affiliation: Nordic Young Conservative Union (NUU)
- Website: muf.se

The Moderate Youth League (Swedish: Moderata ungdomsförbundet [mʊdɛˈrɑ̌ːta ˈɵ̂ŋdʊmsfœrˌbɵndɛt], MUF), officially known in English as the Swedish Young Conservatives, is the youth wing of the Swedish Moderate Party. Of the political youth organizations that received financial support from the Swedish Agency for Youth and Civil Society in 2019, it had the highest number of members.

The Moderate Youth League is more libertarian-leaning and more radical than the mother party. It is generally pro-market, pro-American, pro-Israeli and liberal in social issues such as abortion, gay rights and supports legalization of illegal file sharing and alcohol manufacturing for private, nonprofit purposes. Its official ideologies are liberalism and conservatism.

== History ==
The Moderate Youth League was formed in 1934 as the Young Swedes (Swedish: Ungsvenskarna) as a consequence of the split between the Moderate Party (then the General Electoral Union) and its youth organization, the National Youth League of Sweden (Swedish: Sveriges nationella ungdomsförbund) which had turned into an openly pro-Nazi organization. In 1946 the organization changed its name to the Youth Association of the Right (Swedish: Högerns ungdomsförbund). The current name was adopted in 1969.

== Organization ==
The Moderate Youth League is led by a national executive committee, elected every two years at the national congress. The President is supported by two vice-chairmen. Normally, members of the national executive have served at district level first. The national chairman also sits on the national board of the Moderate Party.

District borders usually follows county borders although Västra Götaland County is split in four different districts. The largest district is Stockholm, followed by Skåne, Östergötland, Gothenburg and Västra Götaland County West.

== Moderate School Youth ==
The Moderate School Youth (Moderat skolungdom, MSU) is a part of the organisation and includes all MUF members between 12 and 20 years of age.

At the annual conference, a national executive is elected. They are not decision-makers but more of an elite campaigning team which travel around Sweden. The national chairman has a place on the national executive of the youth league. The current chairman, since 2026, is Sitra Artursson.

=== List of chairpersons of the Moderate School Youth ===
- 1949: Bern Hedberg
- 1949–1952: Bengt Mollstedt
- 1952–1953: Ulf Molitor
- 1953–1954: Inge Hesselius
- 1954–1956: Thomas Frennstedt
- 1956–1959: Olle Wastesson
- 1959–1961: Håkan Gergils
- 1961–1963: Anders Hagstedt
- 1963–1965: Anders Björck
- 1965–1966: Sven Lindgren
- 1966–1967: Bo Ahlenius
- 1967–1968: Per Unckel
- 1968–1969: Olle Benéus
- 1969–1970: Arne Mårtensson
- 1970–1971: Hans Karlander
- 1971–1973: Lars-Göran Johansson
- 1973–1974: Peeter Luksep
- 1974–1975: Gustaf Björck
- 1975–1976: Odd Eiken
- 1976–1977: Marika Ehrenkrona
- 1977–1978: Ulf Hedlundh
- 1978–1979: Jörn Holmgren
- 1979–1980 Tony Lundström
- 1980–1981: Ann Askenberger
- 1981–1982: Katarina Jonsson
- 1982–1983: Björn Falk
- 1983–1984: Thorbjörn Lindhqvist
- 1984–1985: Sven-Otto Littorin
- 1985–1986: Kerstin Wersäll-Widing
- 1986–1987: Sven Ljungberg
- 1987–1988: Cecilia Bystedt
- 1988–1989: Niklas Kristoffersson
- 1989–1991: Per Lembre
- 1991–1993: Fredrik Wahrolén
- 1993–1994: Mikael Anjou
- 1994–1995: Patrik Ström
- 1995–1996: Henrik von Sydow
- 1996–1997: Christofer Fjellner
- 1997–1998: Johannes Fabo (1997)
- 1998–1999: Johan Forssell
- 1999–2000: Jonatan Forsberg
- 2000–2001: Niklas Wykman
- 2001–2002: Jennifer Lee Åstrand
- 2002–2003: Oscar Hållén
- 2003–2004: Simon Sundén
- 2004–2005: Daniel Valiollahi
- 2005–2006: Christofer Pihl
- 2006–2007: Erik Bengtzboe
- 2007–2009: Sara Dennås
- 2009–2010: Rasmus Törnblom
- 2010–2011: Gustav Löfving
- 2011–2012: Kasper Gieldon
- 2012–2013: Benjamin Dousa
- 2013–2014: Klas Vestergren
- 2014–2016: Mathilda Hjelm
- 2016–2017: Christopher Rydaeus
- 2017–2018: Savo Šević
- 2018–2019: Olle Bring
- 2019–2020: Dalila Alibasic
- 2020–2021: Rebecca Nordin Vainio
- 2021–2022: Linn Wirdemo
- 2022–2023: Joséphine Närholm
- 2023–2024: Alice Landerholm
- 2024–2025: Elin Björkman
- 2025–2026: Kaj Marinov
- 2026–: Sitra Artursson

== Moderate Students ==
In 2008, the Moderate Students was founded as a student network within the Moderate Youth League and it has since then grown to become one of the largest student political organization in Sweden. It is the official student organization of the Moderate Youth League, the youth wing of the Swedish Moderate Party. It is not to be confused with the Free Moderate Students, founded in the 1940s and still active as an independent student wing of the Moderate Party.

=== Organization ===
Moderate Students is a national organization consisting of student associations on various universities and campuses in Sweden. Individual membership is sorted by district. Moderate Students originally existed as a party in the student union at Lund University, before the union was dissolved in 1998. Today, the Moderate Students exist as parties at other universities, such as Uppsala University and Umeå University.

=== Politics ===
Moderate Students focuses primarily on students' economical situations. They have advocated for an extended "work-tax reduction" for young people (Swedish: jobbskatteavdrag) and for removing taxes on work and studies in general. They specifically want to repeal the tax on students who take out a student loan and work in addition to their studies. They have also become involved in discussions about the availability of student housing.

=== List of chairpersons of the Moderate Students ===
- 2009–2010: Caroline Garsbo
- 2010–2011: Erik Persson
- 2011–2012: Ida Drougge
- 2012–2014: Andréa Ström
- 2014–2016: Benjamin Dousa
- 2016–2018: Ina Djurestål
- 2018–2020: Greta Eulau
- 2020–2021: Lucas Ljungberg
- 2021–2022: Douglas Thor
- 2022– : Izabel Riedl

== Former members ==
Naturally many current politicians of the Moderate Party started their careers in the youth league. Two former chairpersons of the youth league have become leaders of the party and Prime Ministers of Sweden: Fredrik Reinfeldt was leader of the party 2003–2015 and Prime Minister 2006–2014 and Ulf Kristersson is the current leader of the party (since 2017) and Prime Minister (since 2022).

In 2002, Tove Lifvendahl became the first youth league chairperson to be elected to the national board of the party directly after resigning from the Moderate Youth League. Many former leaders left politics but gained prominence in other spheres of society, mostly in business.

== Ideology ==
The Moderate Youth League defines its ideology in four statements. Apart from these, the Youth League publishes no manifestos or political programmes of any sort. These are:

- For the freedom of the individual. Against political oppression and coercion.
- For every human's responsibility for his/her own future. Against paternalism and the nanny state (förmynderi och politisk klåfingrighet).
- For diversity and respect for differences. Against intolerance and conformity.
- For a free market and a world without borders. Against walls and regulations.

The modern Moderate Youth League are staunch supporters of capitalism, deregulation and lower taxes. They also adhere to individualism, which extends to wide-reaching support for gay rights. The League supports free trade, free immigration and wants to abolish foreign aid.

Like its opponents in the Swedish Social Democratic Youth League, the Moderate Youth League has suffered from divisions between different factions. The 1990s saw many battles between modernising neoliberals and conservatives. At the congress in Lycksele in 1992, Fredrik Reinfeldt, the former leader between 25 October 2003 – 10 January 2015 of Moderate Party, was elected chairman, defeating the neoliberal Ulf Kristersson. In recent years, however, the division have largely disappeared. With the Moderates becoming more cosmopolitan, the traditionalist Conservatives have all but disappeared. Gay rights were a source of division, but now almost all of the Moderate Youth League supports equal rights of marriage and adoption for homosexuals. A conservative fringe group, however, was formed – Young Conservative Moderates (Unga konservativa moderater) – but did not gain widespread membership.

In foreign policy, MUF tends to support the United States, including the 2003 Iraq War and Swedish NATO membership. Chairperson Tove Lifvendahl proudly wore an "I love Bush" shirt after George W. Bush's election in 2000, although she was quick to criticise him for the steel tariffs he later imposed. It is also strongly supportive of Israel. Though generally supportive of the European Union, the Youth League does not support Sweden adopting the euro.

== Chairpersons ==
- Torgil von Seth, 1934–1941
- Folke Kyling, 1941–1945
- Ebbe Olsson, 1945–1949
- Gunnar Heckscher, 1949–1952
- Bengt Lind, 1952–1954
- Birger Isacson, 1954–1957
- Sven Johansson, 1957–1959
- Paul Brundin, 1959–1961
- Gunnar Hillerdal, 1961–1963
- Birger Hagård, 1963–1965
- Eric Krönmark, 1965–1966
- Anders Björck, 1966–1971
- Per Unckel, 1971–1976
- Per-Arne Arvidson, 1976–1979
- Gunnar Hökmark, 1979–1984
- Beatrice Ask, 1984–1988
- Ulf Kristersson, 1988–1992
- Fredrik Reinfeldt, 1992–1995
- Thomas Idergaard, 1995–1998
- Gunnar Strömmer, 1998–2000
- Tove Lifvendahl, 2000–2002
- Christofer Fjellner, 2002–2004
- Johan Forssell, 2004–2006
- Niklas Wykman, 2006–2010
- Erik Bengtzboe, 2010–2014
- Rasmus Törnblom, 2014–2016
- Benjamin Dousa, 2016–2020
- Matilda Ekeblad, 2020–2022
- Douglas Thor, 2022–
