= Ulf Kristersson =

Prime Minister of Sweden since 2022

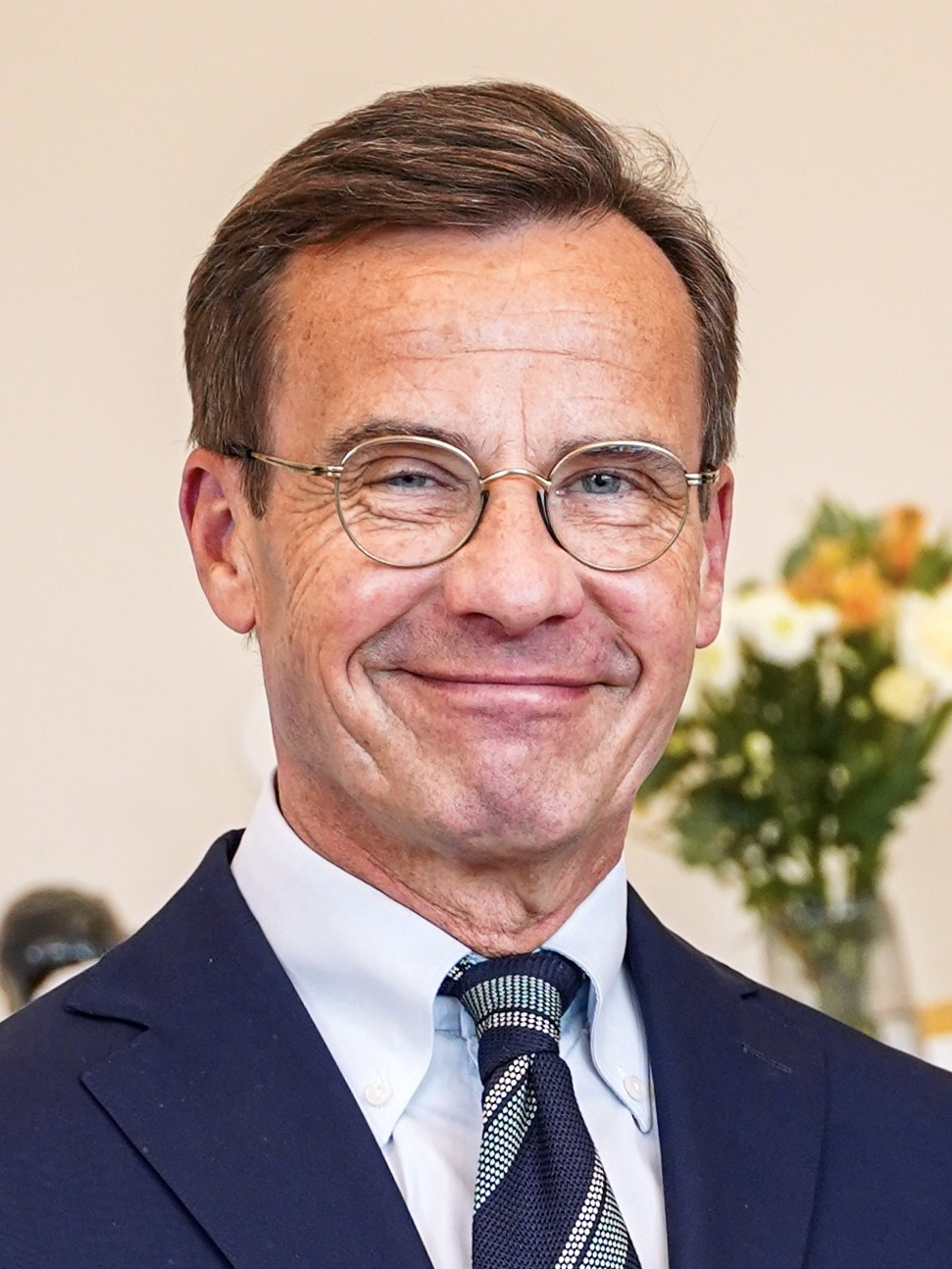
- Kristersson in 2025

Prime Minister of Sweden
- Caretaker (Note: Caretaker since 17 September 2026)
- Assumed office 18 October 2022
- Monarch: Carl XVI Gustaf
- Deputy: Ebba Busch
- Preceded by: Magdalena Andersson

Leader of the Moderate Party
- Incumbent
- Assumed office 1 October 2017
- Deputy: Peter Danielsson; Elisabeth Svantesson
- Party Secretary: Gunnar Strömmer; Karin Enström
- Preceded by: Anna Kinberg Batra

Leader of the Opposition
- In office 1 October 2017 – 18 October 2022
- Monarch: Carl XVI Gustaf
- Prime Minister: Stefan Löfven (2017–2021); Magdalena Andersson (2021–2022)
- Preceded by: Anna Kinberg Batra
- Succeeded by: Magdalena Andersson

Minister for Social Security
- In office 5 October 2010 – 3 October 2014
- Prime Minister: Fredrik Reinfeldt
- Preceded by: Cristina Husmark Pehrsson
- Succeeded by: Annika Strandhäll

Chairman of the Moderate Youth League
- In office 26 November 1988 – 24 October 1992
- Preceded by: Beatrice Ask
- Succeeded by: Fredrik Reinfeldt

Member of the Riksdag
- Incumbent
- Assumed office 4 October 2014
- Constituency: Södermanland County
- In office 5 October 1991 – 30 April 2000
- Constituency: Stockholm Municipality

Personal details
- Born: Ulf Hjalmar Kristersson; 29 December 1963 (age 62) Lund, Sweden
- Party: Moderate Party
- Spouse: Birgitta Ed (m. 1991)
- Children: 3
- Education: Uppsala University (Civilekonom)
- Cabinet: Kristersson's cabinet
- Website: Official website

Military service
- Branch/service: Swedish Army
- Years of service: 1983–1984
- Rank: Sergeant
- Unit: Uppland Regiment

Ulf Hjalmar Kristersson (Note: [ˈɵ̌lːf ˈkrɪ̌stɛˌʂɔn]) (born 29 December 1963) is a Swedish politician who has served as Prime Minister of Sweden since October 2022, and since 17 September 2026 in a caretaker capacity, following the defeat of his governing bloc in that year's general election. He has been the leader of the Moderate Party since 2017. He has been a member of the Riksdag since 2014, having previously served from 1991 to 2000, and was Minister for Social Security from 2010 to 2014.

Kristersson became party leader after Anna Kinberg Batra resigned in 2017. Following the 2022 Swedish general election, he formed the minority Kristersson cabinet consisting of the Moderates, the Christian Democrats and the Liberals, supported by the Sweden Democrats through the Tidö Agreement. The four parties held 176 of the Riksdag's 349 seats, and Kristersson was elected prime minister on 17 October 2022.

As prime minister, Kristersson completed Sweden's accession to NATO, increased defence spending, expanded support for Ukraine and pursued a more restrictive migration policy. In 2024, the number of asylum-related residence permits fell to its lowest level since 1985. His government also expanded preventive police powers; shootings in Sweden fell from 390 in 2022 to 147 in 2025.

Kristersson has been praised for Sweden's NATO integration, increased defence expenditure and support for Ukraine, while critics have focused on his reliance on the nationalist Sweden Democrats, tighter migration policies and a climate policy assessed as insufficient to meet several targets.

== Biography ==
=== Early life ===
Ulf Kristersson was born in Lund, Skåne County, as the eldest of three children to Lars Kristersson (1937–2015) who worked with economics and teacher Karin Kristersson (née Axelsson; 1939–2020). The family moved to Torshälla outside Eskilstuna five years later. In his youth, Kristersson was a troupe gymnast. Kristersson finished secondary school at S:t Eskils gymnasium in Eskilstuna. After graduating, Kristersson did military service as a platoon commander in the Uppland Regiment from 1983 to 1984 and completed a degree in economics at Uppsala University.

=== Early political career ===
In connection with the 1985 Swedish general election, he was employed as a campaigner at the Moderate Youth League (MUF) in Sörmland. On 26 November 1988, he rose to become the new Chairman of MUF, succeeding Beatrice Ask. In 1991, the centre-right Bildt Cabinet took power, and Kristersson became an MP. He served on the Social Security Committee. He soon becomes a vocal critic of the government's crisis agreement with Social Democrats. At the time, Kristersson developed a friendship with the former party leader, Gösta Bohman, who, in some respects, also supported his criticism of the Bildt Cabinet.

In 1992, Kristersson was challenged as chairman of MUF by Fredrik Reinfeldt. The congress was preceded by considerable ideological divisions between liberals and conservatives. All this erupted at the congress in Lycksele, which came to be known as the Battle of Lycksele. Kristersson, the liberal alternative, lost narrowly. It is said that his loss caused his withdrawal from front-line politics and he was subsequently known as part of the "Lost Generation" of the Moderate Party. At the time, he was criticised for his amateurism and preference for communication over political thought.

From 1995 to 1998, Kristersson was chief of marketing at Timbro, a free market think-tank, while also working in parliament. In 1994 he also released the book Non-working Generation at Timbros publishing company. In the book Kristersson argues against the welfare institutions in Sweden and compares these to apartheid because he considered these institutions to force people into passivity.

=== Career outside politics ===
Kristersson left his parliamentary seat in April 2000, feeling that the new party leader Bo Lundgren had declined his services. Kristersson worked for two years in the private sector, mainly as communications director and VP for the internet consultancy Adcore, a dotcom crash casualty.

Kristersson was chairman of the Swedish Adoption Centre (Adoptionscenter). During his time as chairman, information emerged that the centre handled adoptions of children trafficked from China.

=== Municipal politics ===
He returned to active politics in 2002 as Commissioner (Mayor) for Finance in Strängnäs and served there until 2006. In 2006, he was appointed Vice Mayor (Socialborgarråd) in Stockholm, responsible for the social welfare and labor division.

During this time Kristersson got a rental contract for a five-room apartment in central Stockholm from Ersta Diakoni. Ersta Diakoni describes its basic purpose as "to be a support for people in vulnerable situations, to take social responsibility and to offer care." Due to that, Stockholm city was contracting and gave economical aid to Ersta Diakoni, that, among other things provided for housing for those in social need. An investigation was started and Kristersson and another person in the associations leadership were suspected of bribery. According to an internal policy document, the apartments in the building were reserved for those newly employed by the association and students at Marie Cederschiöld högskola. The investigation was closed with the motivation that Kristersson did not have direct influence over the aid that the association could give.

Fredrik Reinfeldt also asked Kristersson to lead the committee responsible for developing a new family policy for the party. He immediately caused controversy by suggesting that fathers must take a month of paternity leave for the family to receive all benefits. This was clearly conflicted with traditional Moderate Party policy, which has centred on individual choice.

=== Return to national politics ===
On 5 October 2010, Fredrik Reinfeldt appointed Kristersson to become Minister of Social Security, a position he held for four years. After the 2014 Swedish general election, the Reinfeldt cabinet resigned, but Kristersson was elected as MP again, this time for Södermanland County. Following Reinfeldt's resignation as party leader, Anna Kinberg Batra appointed him as Shadow Finance Minister.

== Leader of the Moderate Party ==
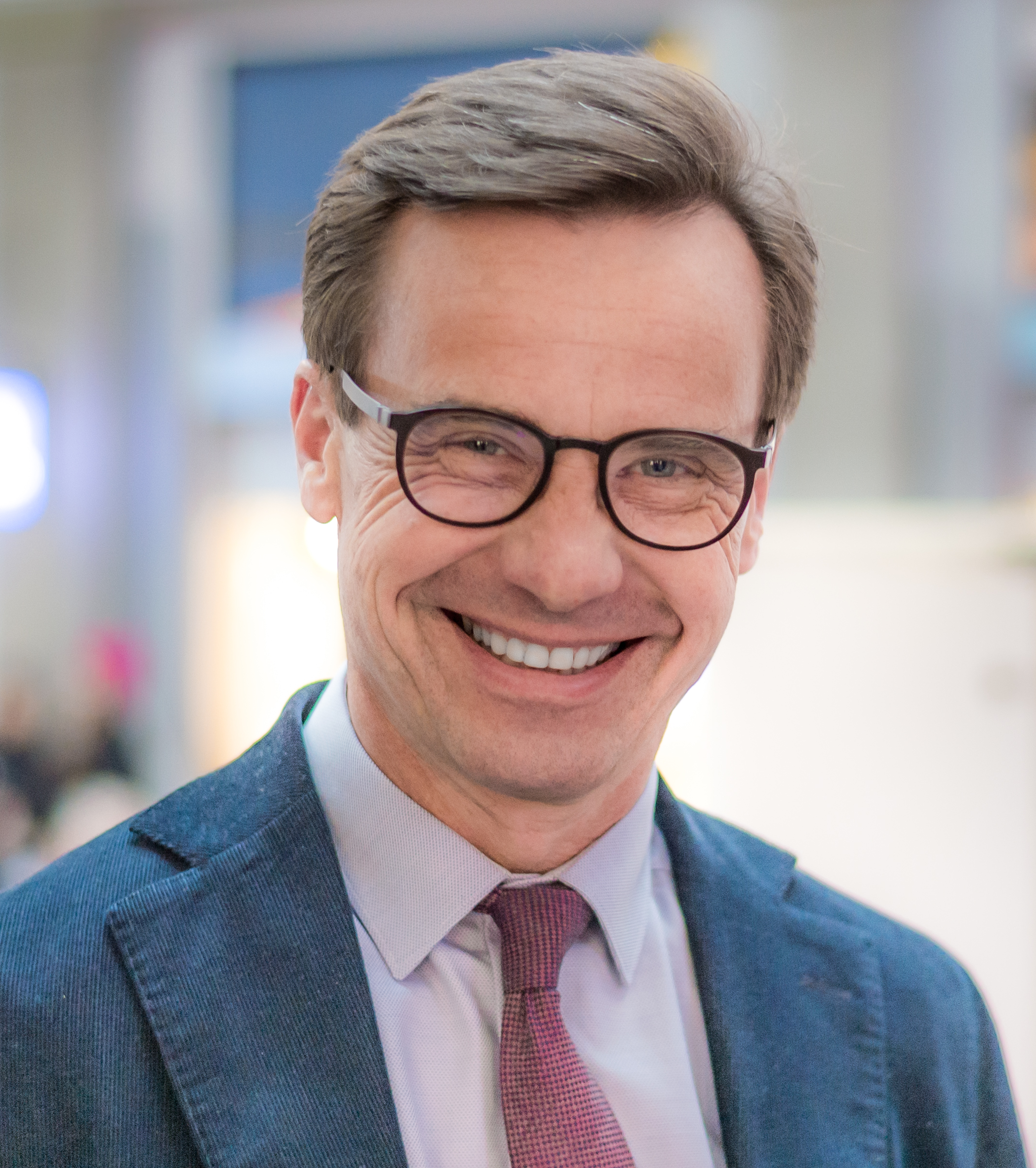
Kristersson in the 2018 Swedish general election.

Anna Kinberg Batra resigned as leader of the Moderates on 25 August 2017, after internal criticism. Kristersson publicly decided to run for leadership on 1 September and was elected on 1 October. The party saw a sharp increase in support in the polls, compared to the record low numbers under his predecessor Batra. He has a harsher stance against immigration than his predecessors.

=== 2018–2019 government formation ===
In September 2018, incumbent Prime Minister Stefan Löfven was ousted. Kristersson expressed hope of becoming the next prime minister. On 2 October, he was designated by Speaker of the Riksdag Andreas Norlén to form a new government. He initially sought to form a government coalition involving the Alliance parties (Moderate Party, Centre Party, Christian Democrats and Liberals) with support from the Swedish Social Democratic Party (S). On 9 October, he said that S had rejected all further talks on agreements and that he would now seek other ways to form a new government. On 14 October, he stated that he was not able to form a new government.

On 5 November 2018, Speaker Norlén proposed Kristersson as prime minister following breakdowns in all other government negotiations. On 14 November 2018, the Riksdag rejected Kristersson's bid to become prime minister by a vote of 195 to 154. It was the first time ever that a speaker's proposal for Prime Minister lost such a vote and the first time in 40 years that centre-right parties (Centre Party and Liberals) vetoed a centre-right candidate for Prime Minister.

=== 2019–present ===
Kristersson held a meeting in December 2019 with Jimmie Åkesson, leader of the Sweden Democrats, and said that he would cooperate with them in parliament. The anti-immigration party had previously been subject to a cordon sanitaire by all other parties, with Kristersson himself ruling out dialogue with them ahead of the 2018 elections. According to Ann-Cathrine Jungar of Södertörn University, this put Sweden in line with several other European countries in which centre-right and radical-right parties cooperate. In August 2020, he criticised the government for a perceived failure to deal with rising crime, including gun violence, which he called a "second pandemic".

==== 2021 government crisis ====
On 29 June 2021, after Prime Minister Stefan Löfven was ousted, Speaker of the Riksdag Andreas Norlén formally tasked Kristersson with forming a government. Kristersson had until 3 July to report his potential government to Norlén. Kristersson planned to lead a coalition of his own party along with the Christian Democrats, Liberals, and Sweden Democrats. On 1 July, Kristersson informed the Speaker that he did not have enough support to form a government and returned his mandate.

=== 2022 government formation ===
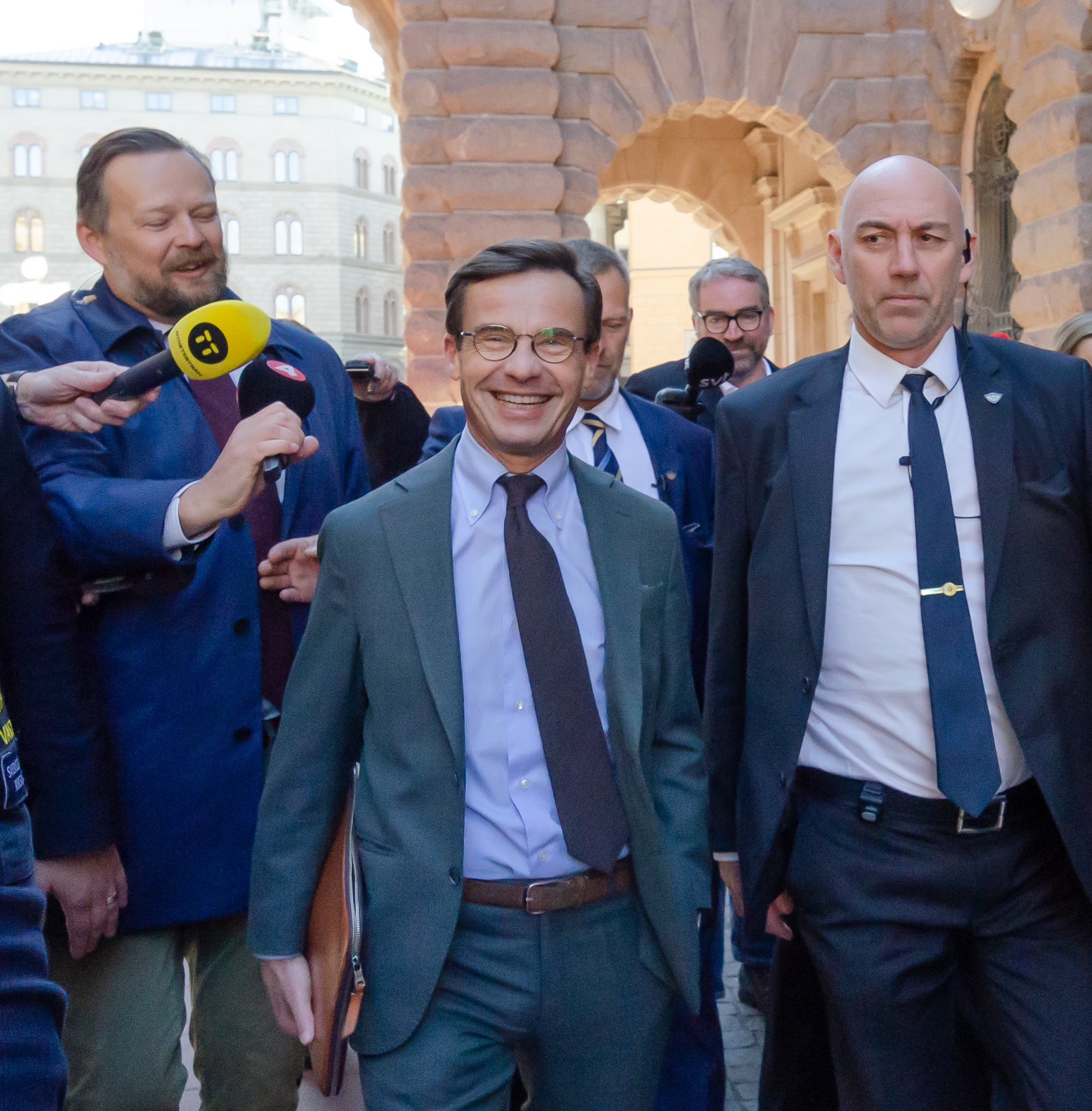
Kristersson going to meet the Speaker, October 2022.

Kristersson led the Moderate Party (M) during the 2022 campaign, in which his party lost parliamentary seats, as well as the second-place position (for the first time since the 1976 Swedish general election); nonetheless, the right-wing bloc gained an absolute majority, resulting in Magdalena Andersson's resignation and Kristersson's nomination as prime minister by Speaker Andreas Norlén. Kristersson signalled his preference for a coalition government between M, the Christian Democrats (KD) and Liberals (L) with external support from the Sweden Democrats (SD).

On 14 October, Kristersson presented the fully documented Tidö Agreement (Tidöavtalet) between M, KD, L and SD. This enabled the first three parties to seek a mandate for a new national administration to be chosen by the Riksdag, with SD given strong influence amounting to confidence and supply. On 17 October, Kristersson was elected prime minister by 176 Riksdag votes for, and 173 votes against him, with no absentees or abstentions. It is the first time SD has exerted direct government influence. European Union lawmakers criticised the center-right and the Moderate Party in particular, as a member of the European People's Party, for allying with the far right, as did opposition leaders.

The joint programme places particular emphasis on fighting crime, reducing immigration and reviving nuclear energy. The quota of refugees accepted each year would be drastically reduced from 6,400 to 900. The new authorities are also planning deportations for "bad behaviour". In terms of security policy, there is talk of authorizing searches in the absence of suspicious behaviour in certain neighbourhoods deemed sensitive, increasing the penalties and opening up the possibility of anonymous testimony in court. A national ban on begging will be tested. The agreement also provides for a downward revision of Sweden's greenhouse gas emission targets, a reduction in development aid and possible privatization.

With 19.1% of the vote for his party, Kristersson is the prime minister with the smallest amount of the vote since 1978. He began his term of office with a significantly lower popularity rating than that of the outgoing Prime Minister Magdalena Andersson.

== Prime Minister of Sweden (2022–present) ==
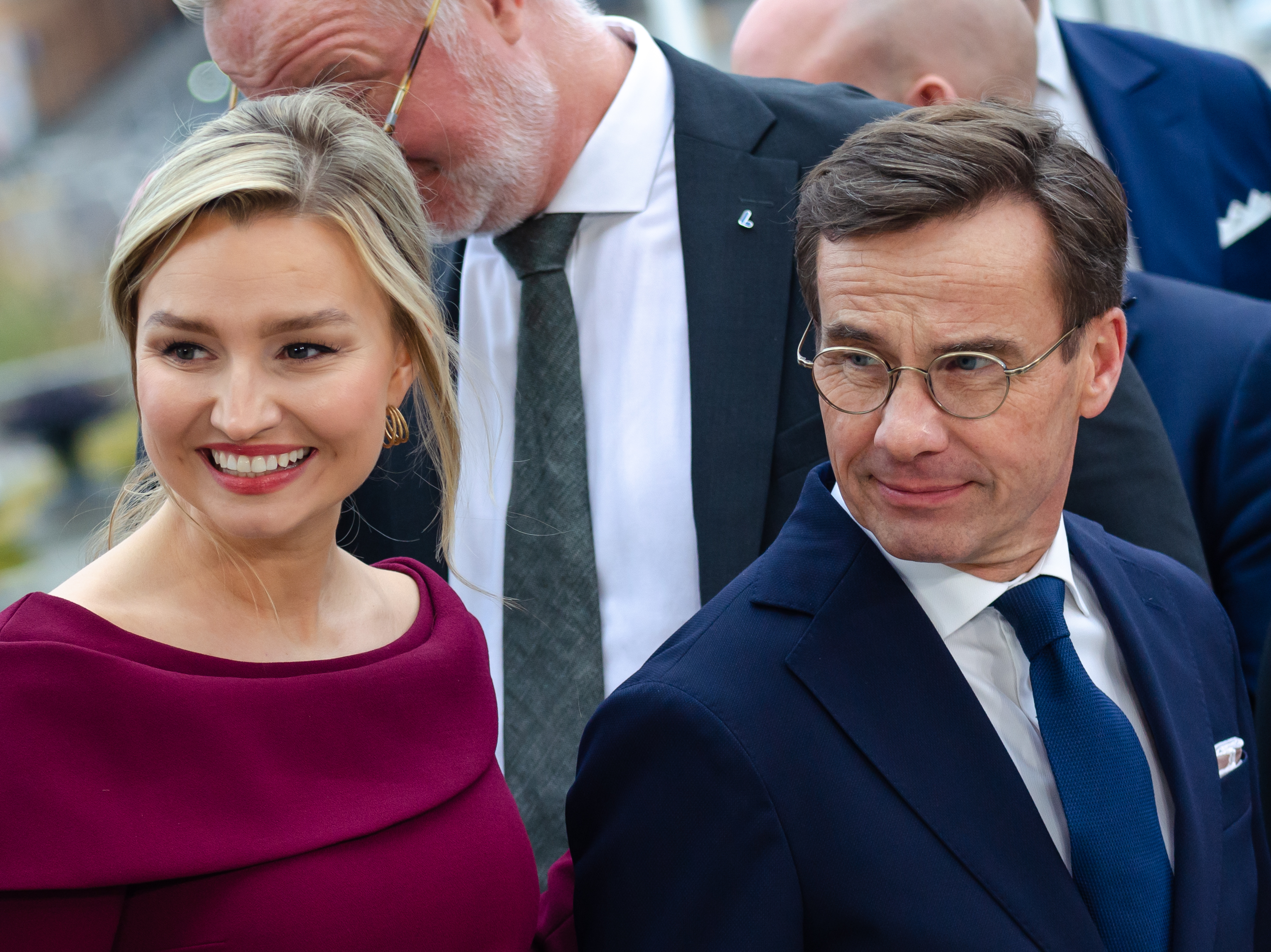
Kristersson with Deputy Prime Minister of Sweden Ebba Busch in 2022.

On 18 October 2022, Kristersson as per constitutional requirements, was officially identified by King Carl XVI Gustaf as the new Prime Minister during a meeting of the Council of State, having announced his government program earlier that day in a speech to the Riksdag as well as having appointed the ministers of his cabinet.

Kristersson reshuffled his cabinet for the first time on 10 September 2024 during his Declaration of Government speech at the Riksdag Opening Ceremony.

=== Domestic policy ===
==== Defence ====
Since May 2022, Sweden was in the process of joining NATO, after having received broad support in the Riksdag from both the then government of Magdalena Andersson and the four parties, then in opposition, now supporting Kristersson as prime minister. On 8 March 2023, the Kristersson government submitted the bill allowing Sweden's membership in NATO to the Riksdag, which then approved a revised version of the bill on 22 March 2023. Sweden officially joined the alliance on 7 March 2024 when Kristersson signed and delivered the Instrument of Accession to US Secretary of State Antony Blinken during a press conference in Washington, D.C. Later the same day he was invited to attend the 2024 State of the Union. He also held a televised address to the nation to mark the occasion.

In the government's first budget, Minister for Finance Elisabeth Svantesson committed Sweden's defence expenditure to reach 2% of GDP by 2026. In line with this commitment, the government announced an increase in defence spending by 13.1 billion SEK, from 74.8 billion SEK to 87.9 billion SEK for the year 2023. The budget included the establishment of the Swedish Agency for Defence Analysis from 1 January 2023.

On 2 December 2022, Bergslagen Artillery Regiment (A9) was reopened after having been closed in 2000.

In April and May 2023, the Swedish Armed Forces executed the largest military exercise in Sweden in 34 years, Aurora 23. A total of 26,000 men and women participated in the exercise, which consisted of 14 participating countries and which involved all combat forces and defence branches. The exercise scenario was that a foreign power attacked Sweden on 24 April 2023.

On 30 September 2024, Supreme Commander Micael Bydén's commission is set to expire. This will end his tenure as Supreme Commander which has lasted since 2015. In June 2024 Kristersson announced his government had appointed Lieutenant General Michael Claesson as his successor to take office on 1 October 2024.

In 2025, Kristersson announced that his government had decided to go ahead with the largest rearmament of the Swedish Armed Forces since the Cold War. The plan in 2025 was to, over the course of a decade, loan 300 billion SEK to finance the venture. Kristersson claimed after a meeting with opposition leaders that there was "broad unity" for the proposal.

==== Environmental policy ====
Shortly after taking office, the Kristersson government began rolling back parts of Sweden’s climate policy. It cuts the climate budget by nearly 20%, abolishes subsidies for the purchase of electric vehicles, suspends funding provided to municipalities to support the green transition, abandons plans for high-speed rail links between the country’s three major cities, reduces the share of biofuels blended into petrol and diesel, and repeals the aviation tax introduced in 2018, as well as the tax on single-use plastic bags.

The government has faced criticism for what is seen as an unambitious climate policy and for its inability to explain how it intends to meet its greenhouse gas emissions reduction targets. In its 2023 annual report, the Swedish Climate Policy Council noted that the country was “losing momentum” and found that, for the first time in twenty years, the measures announced by the government “will increase emissions in the short term.” The Sweden Democrats, who are part of the governing majority, have called for Sweden to officially abandon its 2045 net-zero target.

In 2024, Sweden recorded a 7% increase in its CO2 emissions, the largest rise of any European country. The Swedish Environmental Protection Agency subsequently acknowledged that the country would fail to meet any of its climate targets for 2030 through 2045.

==== Energy ====
During his first 100 days in office, Kristersson's government adopted policies that removed the bans on building new nuclear reactors, increased funding to the Swedish Radiation Safety Authority, abolished taxes on cogeneration electricity production, increased incentives for municipalities to approve the expansion wind power plants and allocated 379 million SEK for investments in energy efficiency in single-family houses. The government also announced that Sweden's energy policy goal is to be changed from 100% "renewable energy" to 100% "fossil free energy".

In December 2022 and early January 2023, state owned energy company Vattenfall as well as Finnish state owned energy company Fortum both announced plans to build new nuclear reactors in Sweden.

On 18 April 2023, Vattenfall announced the largest expansion in Swedish hydroelectric power in over 30 years. The estimated production increase of the planned expansion is 720 MW, an increase by 9% of the companys current hydroelectric power production.

On 27 April 2023, the government instructed the Swedish Energy Agency to support the implementation of stress tests in the energy sector. The purpose of the instruction is to increase the resilience in Sweden's energy sector and was partly in response to the 2022 Nord Stream pipeline sabotage.

===== Response to the energy crisis =====
In response to the global energy crisis, on 27 October 2022, Kristersson and Ebba Busch announced a 55 billion (SEK) high-cost protection compensation in connection to the high increase of power bills for households; this first part of the protection was only paid out in the energy price zones three and four (2 out of 4 zones) in the southern parts of Sweden. On 9 January 2023, the government announced the next step in the compensation scheme which included all four energy price zones.

To prevent the risk electricity-intensive production moving abroad in the event of bankruptcy due to high energy prices, the government announced on 22 December 2022 the introduction of high-cost protection compensation for electricity-intensive companies. The European Commission approved the high-cost protection for companies on 16 February 2023.

==== Migration ====
During his first 100 days in office, Kristersson's government adopted policies in line with his stated paradigm shift in Swedish migration policies. This has included an increase by 25% of the number of internal controls on foreigners, a mission to authorities to intensify the work regarding the return of persons who do not meet the requirements to stay in Sweden, increased number of storage places, carrying out information efforts and analyze opportunities to increase voluntary repatriation and lowered the level of quota refugees to 900 per year (a decrease from 5,000 per year) and the Swedish Migration Agency has been tasked with preparing for the changes.

On 5 April 2023, the government proposed a requirement that all asylum seekers, with the exception of unaccompanied minors, must live in state accommodation and participate in social introduction during the asylum process, that people who for some reason do not live in asylum accommodation should inform the Swedish Migration Agency of their residential address. For asylum seekers who do not notify the Swedish Migration Agency, the authority must regard the asylum application as withdrawn, with the consequence that the asylum seeker needs to leave the country. The proposal also included that asylum seekers must be required to participate in social introduction according to law. It is expected that the proposed changes will be law by 1 April 2024.

In 2023 Sweden reported the lowest number of asylum seekers it had recorded during the 21st century. By August 2024 the number of asylum seekers had decreased by 27%. The Migration Agency predicts Sweden will in 2024 have the lowest number of immigrants since 1997, and will for the first time in over 50 years have more people migrating from Sweden than immigrating to Sweden.

In July 2026, in response to the migration crisis in Ceuta, Kristersson called on the Spanish government to regain control of its border and said that Sweden was "prepared to take the measures required to safeguard order and control". He also said that Sweden was prepared to consider suspending Schengen arrangements with Spain to prevent a recurrence of the 2015 European migrant crisis.

==== Crime prevention ====
In the 2020s, violence of organised crime gangs escalated in Sweden. Kristersson announced during a speech to the nation in September 2023 that he would call in the country's armed forces for help. He would discuss with the heads of the Försvarsmakten and the police how soldiers could support police officers in their work against criminal gangs.

To make cooperation between different government agencies easier when it comes to matters regarding national security Kristersson's cabinet established the National Security Council. Kristersson also appointed his childhood friend Henrik Landerholm as Sweden's first National Security Advisor.

From 1 February 2024, the Police Authority can hand out "stay bans" to individuals promoting or taking part violence even if they haven't been convicted of any crime. A "stay ban" would ban the individual in question from entering and staying in a certain designated public area. The policy is supposed to increase safety standards in public spaces.

On 25 April 2024, Kristersson's government implemented stop and search zones, referred to as 'Security Zones'. In these temporary zones police are able to search people and vehicles without any suspicion of a crime on grounds such as wearing clothing brands associated with gangs and deviant behavior.

On 1 January 2025, a law regarding anonymous witnesses was set into motion after years of debate, allowing witnesses to crimes the ability to inform authorities without sharing their identity. Kristersson pushed for this legal change within debates in the years leading up to this, and was one among many who proposed the law. One reason for this change was the fact that personal information in Sweden is public in the case of almost every citizen on sites such as Hitta.se and Eniro, where their addresses are also listed, leading to unhindered opportunities for convicted felons to retaliate against their witnesses. Kristersson, however, has not moved to alter this, unlike anonymous witnesses specifically. Despite the law being scheduled for 2025, Kristersson claimed in one speech prior to 1 January that the law was already in effect.

In 2025, Kristersson's government brought the number of homicides down to 84 for the year, the lowest level in a decade. Additionally, in 2025 shootings were down 63% from their 2022 peak in 2025. In 2024 from January to August there were 139 bombings in Sweden. That number had come down to 75 over the same period in 2025.

==== Alcohol distribution ====
In June 2024, Kristersson announced during a press conference that his government intended to introduce legislation allowing vineyards to in limited quantities sell their own liquor to guests in connection with lectures or guided tours of the property. This proposal is planned to take effect in 2025 and is not to affect Systembolaget's monopoly on selling liquor. The proposal would allow 600 vineyards and distilleries to distribute their liquor. Kristersson called the proposal a "freedom reform".

==== Economy ====
One of the early priorities of Kristersson's cabinet was the fight against inflation, which since 2021 had been above the Riksbanks goal rate of 2%, reaching as high as 12% in December 2022. By 2024 Finance Minister Elisabeth Svantesson reported that inflation had fallen to roughly 3%, with her and Kristersson claiming victory in the battle against inflation. The government said it would now shift its focus from battling inflation to creating and ensuring economic growth and fighting unemployment.

In August 2024 Kristersson's government announced it would repeal the controversial Aviation Tax in their 2025 Spring Budget. This is supposed to enhance Sweden's competitiveness and decrease prices on commercial flights. The opposition, particularly the Green Party, criticised the government for this decision stating that it would increase carbon emissions and Sweden's environmental impacts. Companies within the aviation industry welcomed the decision.

=== Foreign policy ===
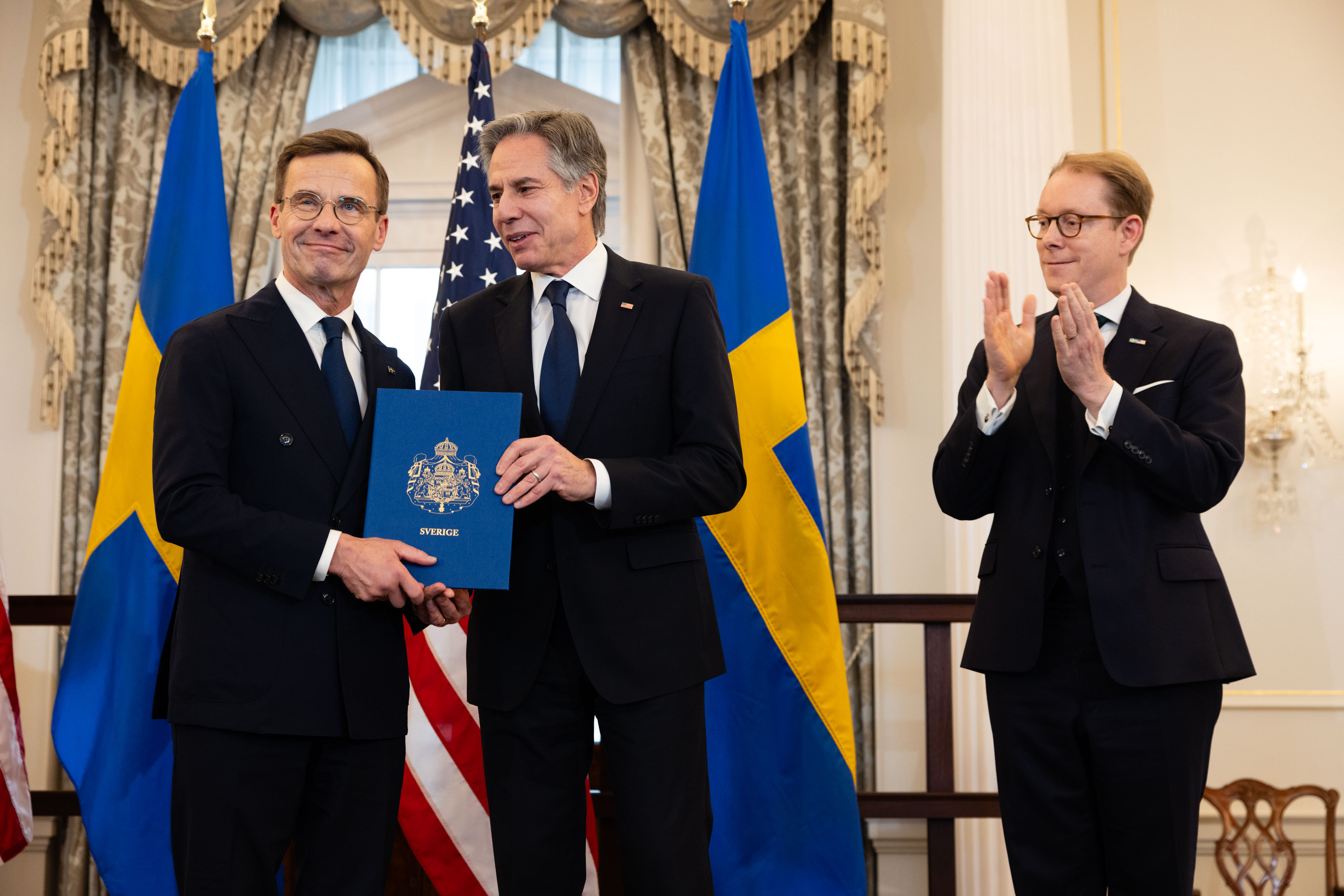
Kristersson, US Secretary of State Antony Blinken and Swedish Foreign Minister Tobias Billström during the NATO ratification ceremony in Washington, D.C., 7 March 2024

The first foreign leaders to meet with Kristersson were Finnish President Sauli Niinistö and Finnish Prime Minister Sanna Marin, whom he travelled to Helsinki to meet on 28 October 2022. He held bilateral meetings with both, primarily focused on the ongoing energy crisis, defence and security policy and the Russian invasion of Ukraine.

On 7 November 2022, Kristersson attended the 2022 United Nations Climate Change Conference in Sharm el-Sheikh and delivered the national address to the conference as well as co-chaired discussions on food supply chains.

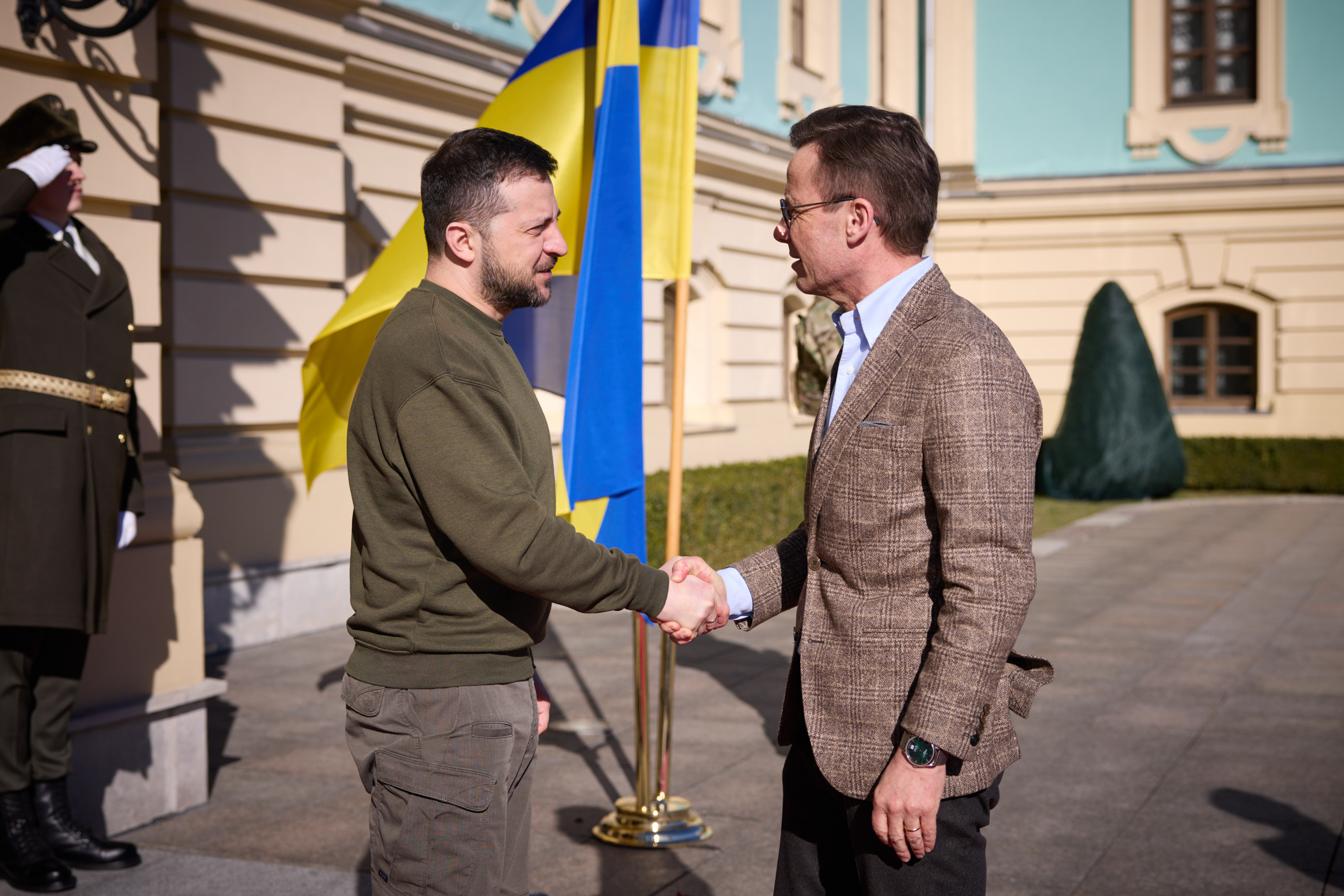
Kristersson with Ukrainian President Volodymyr Zelenskyy in 2023.

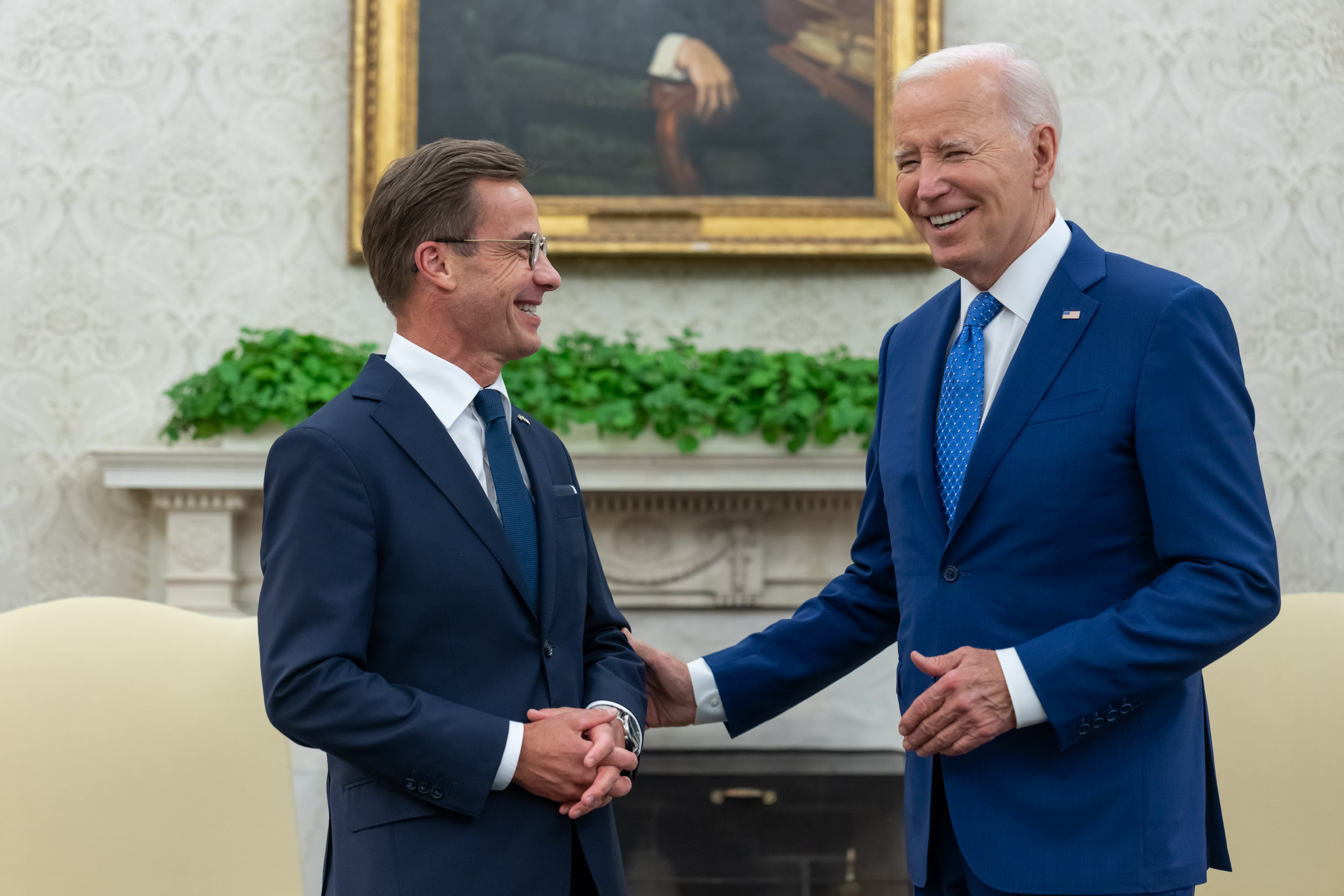
Kristersson with U.S. President Joe Biden on 5 July 2023

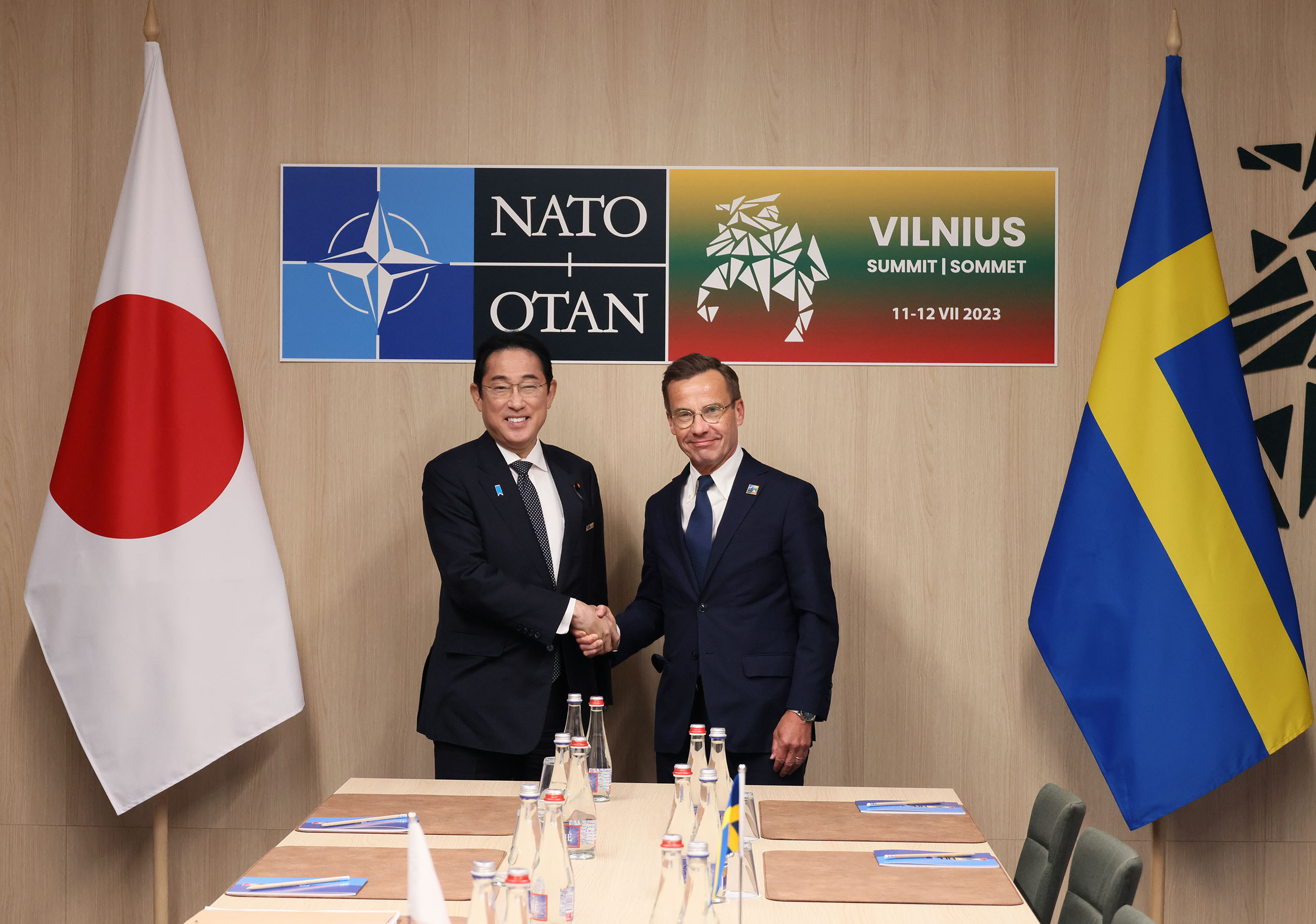
Kristersson with Japanese Prime Minister Fumio Kishida on 12 July 2023

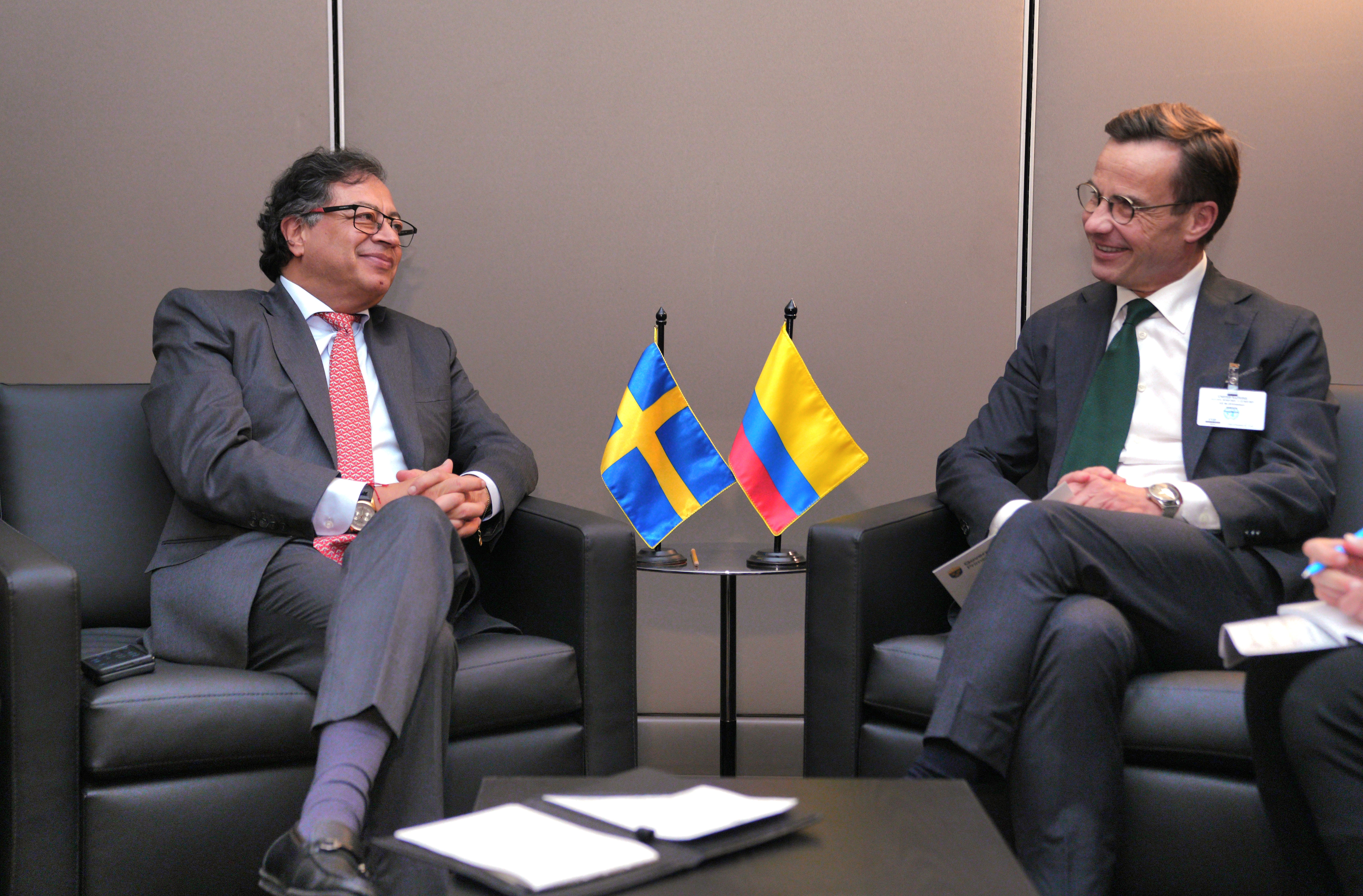
Kristersson with Colombian President Gustavo Petro on 18 September 2023

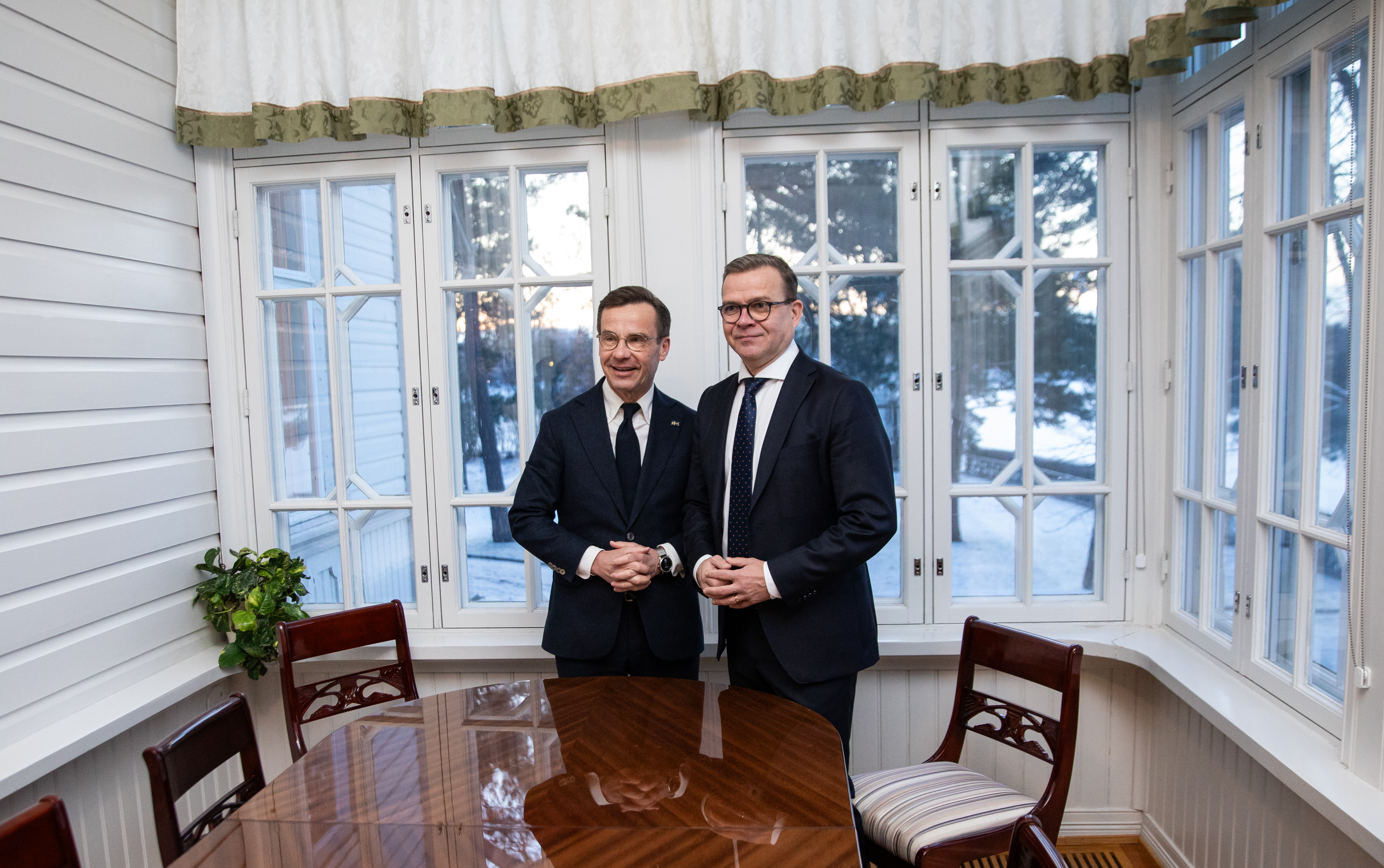
Kristersson with Finnish Prime Minister Petteri Orpo on 27 November 2023

On 8 November 2022, he travelled to Ankara to meet with Turkish President Recep Tayyip Erdoğan. They spoke, among other things, about Sweden's application to join NATO. Kristersson promised to end support for the Kurdish Kurdistan Workers' Party (PKK) and People's Defense Units (YPG) militia.

On 1 January 2023, Sweden took over the presidency of the Council of the European Union for a six-month term. Prior to that, Sweden outlined four priorities for their presidency:

- Security – Unity
- Resilience – Competitiveness
- Prosperity – Green transition and energy transition
- Democratic values and the rule of law – Our foundation

On 15 February 2023, Kristersson visited Ukraine and met with President Volodymyr Zelenskyy to discuss the ongoing Russian invasion. Kristersson stressed that "Ukraine belongs to Europe and belongs in the European Union". During a joint press meeting, Kristersson underlined that Sweden intends to continue with political, economic and military support to Ukraine.

In April 2023, after approval from the Riksdag, Kristersson's cabinet authorised a military evacuation operation that evacuated Swedish diplomatic staff from the Swedish Embassy in Khartoum and their families from Sudan, as well as a large number of other Swedish citizens currently staying in Sudan. In addition, a number of Swedish citizens left Sudan in other ways and over 100 other foreign citizens were evacuated by Swedish flights. The reason for the evacuation operation was the outbreak of the 2023 Sudan conflict.

In late 2023, the Kristersson cabinet failed to evacuate Swedish dual citizens from the Gaza Strip following the outbreak of the Gaza war. In November 2023, Kristersson said that Israel has the right to self-defence.

In July 2024, Kristersson attended the 2024 Washington summit, the first NATO summit attended by Sweden as an official member of the alliance.

In November 2024, Kristersson congratulated Donald Trump for his victory in the 2024 United States presidential election, but also noted the risks associated with another Trump term. He declared changes in US aid to Ukraine in the Russo-Ukrainian War as the largest risk, and suggested increasing European support to Ukraine. Another worry Kristersson expressed pertained to Trump's actions and promises regarding the Paris Climate Agreement.

In December 2024, Kristersson cancelled a scheduled visit to South Korea as a result of President Yoon Suk-Yeol's decision to impose martial law and the subsequent developments.

On 2 March 2025, Kristersson attended a meeting of European leaders led by British Prime Minister Keir Starmer in London to discuss the security situation in Ukraine. Kristersson described the meeting as "much more important after yesterday's events in Washington, D.C.", referring to the failed meeting between U.S President Trump and Ukrainian President Zelenskyy.

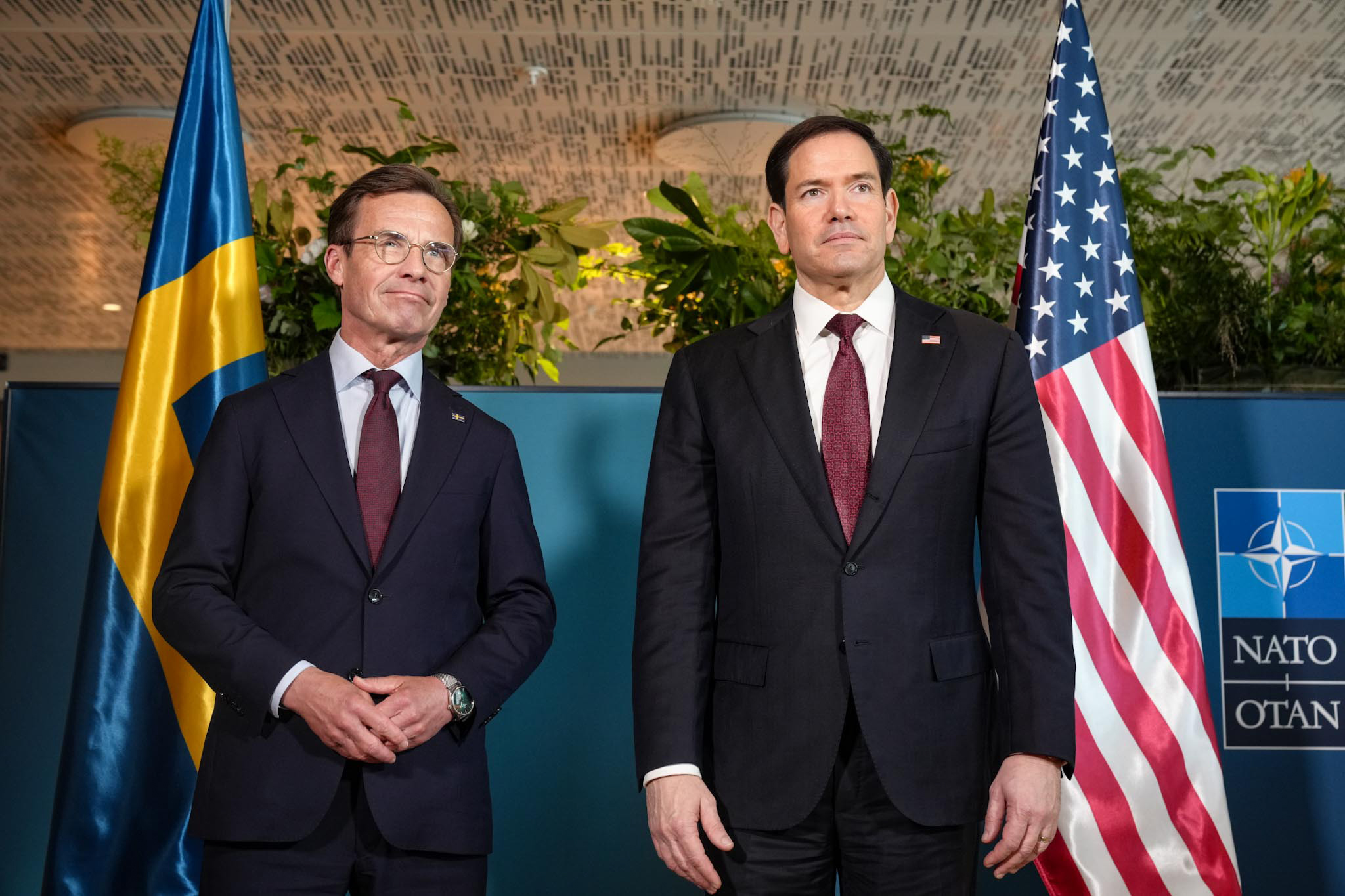
Kristersson with U.S. Secretary of State Marco Rubio on 22 May 2026

In January 2026, following the capture of Venezuelan President Nicolás Maduro by U.S. forces, Kristersson expressed a nuanced stance that balanced support for democratic transition with concerns over international legal standards. In January 2026, Kristersson reaffirmed Sweden's support for Denmark's and Greenland's sovereignty amidst renewed U.S. interest in acquiring Greenland.

On 28 February 2026, following joint U.S.–Israeli strikes on Iran, Kristersson expressed support for Sweden's allies while criticizing the Iranian regime's oppression of its citizens. He characterized Iran’s nuclear program and its support for militant groups as long-term destabilizing factors in the Middle East.

=== Resignation and caretaker government ===
Following the 2026 general election, Kristersson resigned as prime minister on 17 September 2026 after the governing parties lost their parliamentary majority.

Kristersson and his government remain in office as a caretaker government pending the formation of a new government. The Speaker of the Riksdag leads the process of forming a new government and proposes a candidate for prime minister to the Riksdag.

== Political positions and image ==
A 2018 political profile in The Local described Kristersson as exuding "nice guy vibes: smart, humble and reasonable, easygoing and open to discussion" while positioning him to the right of his predecessors on issues such as crime and immigration. He was also described in the same profile as representing the neoliberal wing of the Moderate Party (M).

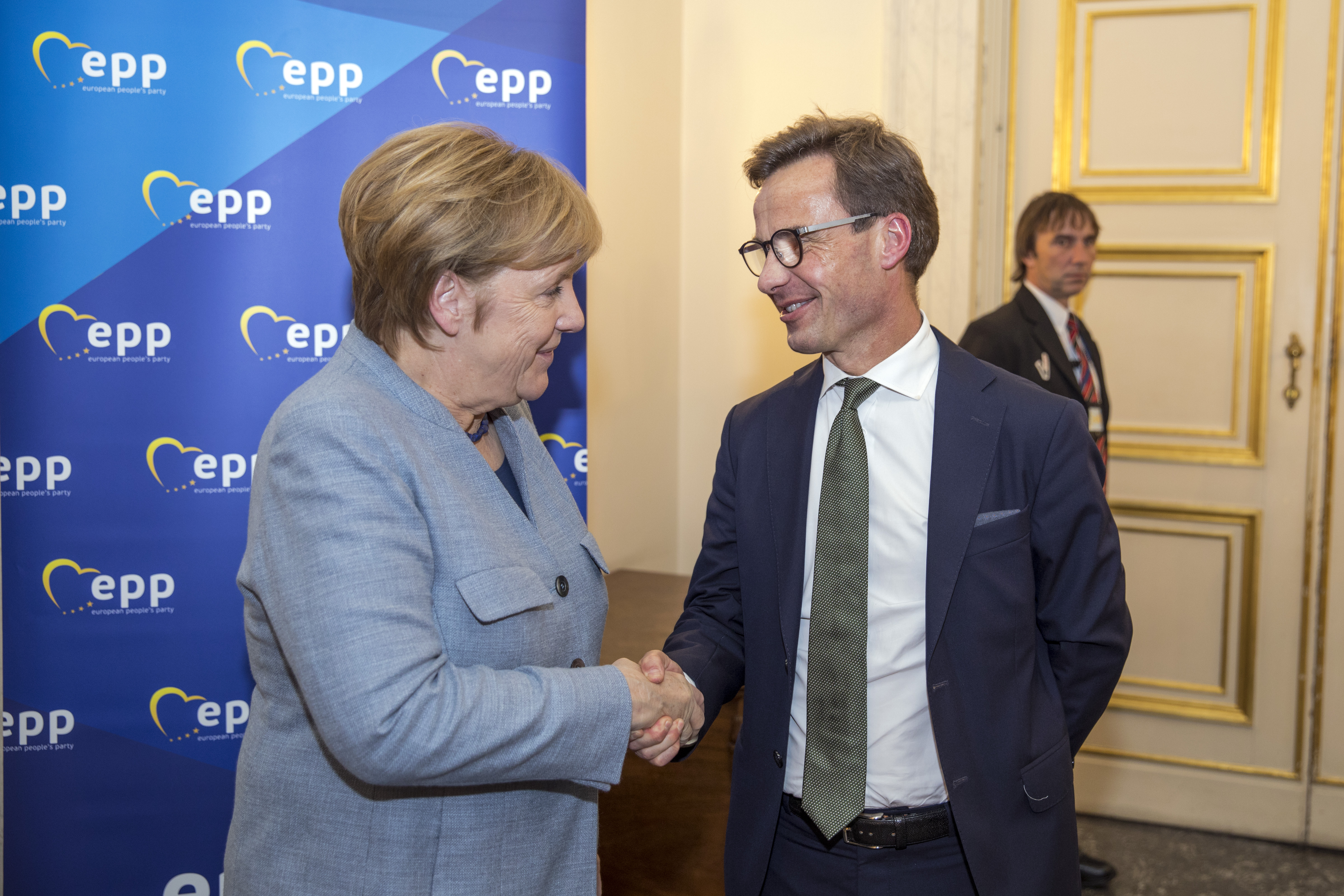
Kristersson with then-German Chancellor Angela Merkel in 2017

Kristersson himself has described social mobility as one of his core concerns in politics. In his first leadership speech, Kristersson stated that Sweden should become "a country for hopefuls" and that the Moderate Party should be "a party for hopefuls". On the matter of asylum, Kristersson states that he supports the integration of refugees into Swedish society but argues for compulsory cultural assimilation and learning of the Swedish language, and that refugees be put to work and pay tax.

Kristersson initially ruled out forming an alliance with the Sweden Democrats (SD) upon assuming party leadership; following the 2018 Swedish general election, he ended the policy of non-cooperation and met with SD's leadership for official talks. Before the 2022 Swedish general election, Kristersson suggested that he would form a loose right-wing bloc consisting of M, the Christian Democrats (KD), Liberals (L) and SD but expressed uncertainty at SD's demand that they be allocated cabinet positions should the right-wing bloc win a majority. Following the election, Kristersson signalled his ambition to form a new conservative government with support from SD.

In 2023, following a series of Quran burnings in Sweden, a trend started by Danish-Swedish politician Rasmus Paludan which garnered international attention, Kristersson publicly denounced these actions. However, he affirmed his belief in freedom of expression, asserting that despite his condemnation, he acknowledges the legality of the burning of any book including holy ones.

== Personal life ==
Kristersson lives in Strängnäs. He has been married since 1991 to Birgitta Ed (b. 1968), formerly a public relations consultant and as of 2023 a priest in the clergy of the Church of Sweden. They have adopted three daughters from China. Kristersson does not consider himself a religious believer. He has a common sister-in-law, Marita Bildt, with former Swedish prime minister Carl Bildt.

== Honours ==
=== National honours ===
- Sweden: Recipient of the Golden Jubilee Badge Medal of King Carl XVI Gustaf (15 September 2023)
- Sweden: Recipient of the Golden Wedding Medal of King Carl XVI Gustaf and Queen Silvia (13 June 2026)

=== Foreign honours ===
- France: Grand Officer of the Order of the Legion of Honour (30 January 2024)
- Finland: Grand Cross of the Order of the White Rose of Finland (23 April 2024)
- Denmark: Grand Cross of the Order of the Dannebrog (6 May 2024)
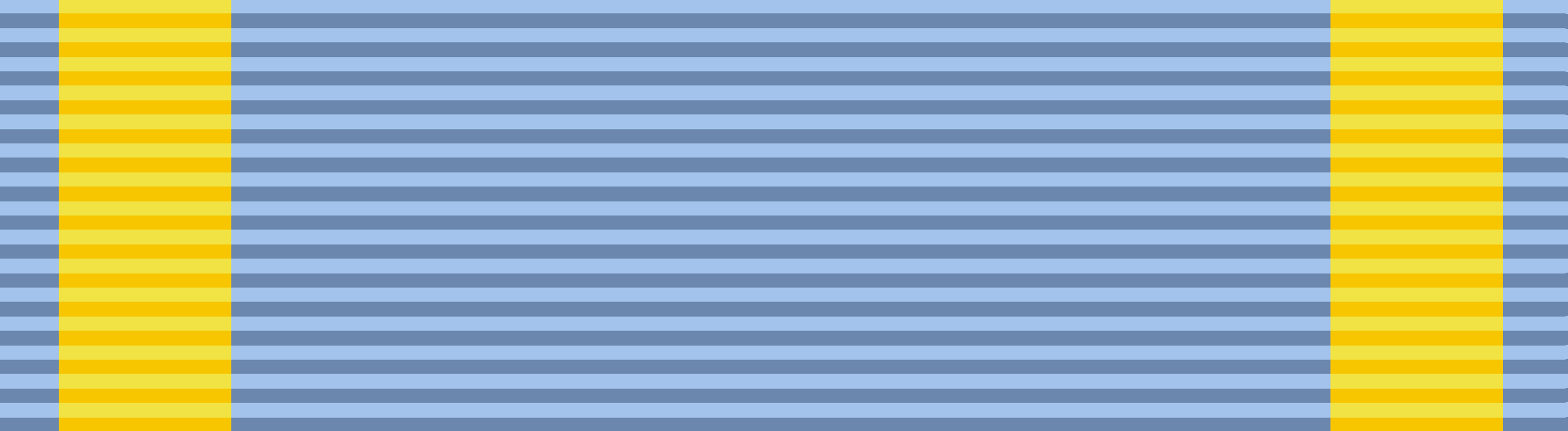
- Ukraine: First Class of the Order of Prince Yaroslav the Wise (26 August 2024)
- Iceland: Grand Cross of the Order of the Falcon (6 May 2025)

== See also ==
- List of current heads of state and government
- List of heads of the executive by approval rating

Party political offices
Preceded by Beatrice Ask	Chairman of the Moderate Youth League; 1988–1992	Succeeded by Fredrik Reinfeldt
Preceded by Anna Kinberg Batra	Leader of the Moderate Party; 2017–present	Incumbent
Political offices
Preceded by Cristina Husmark Pehrsson	Minister for Social Security; 2010–2014	Succeeded by Annika Strandhäll
Preceded by Anna Kinberg Batra	Leader of the Opposition; 2017–2022	Succeeded by Magdalena Andersson
Preceded by Magdalena Andersson	Prime Minister of Sweden; 2022–present	Incumbent
Order of precedence
Preceded by Andreas Norlén as Speaker of the Riksdag	Swedish order of precedence Prime Minister	Succeeded by Jan Björklund as Marshal of the Realm
