= Minister affair at the announcement of the Reinfeldt cabinet =

2006 political scandal in Sweden

The minister affair at the announcement of the Reinfeldt cabinet in Sweden is a political scandal which started on October 7, 2006 when the Cabinet of Fredrik Reinfeldt, which had been announced on October 6, immediately became affected by media allegations on past errors on the part of several cabinet ministers, in particular Maria Borelius, Cecilia Stegö Chilò and Tobias Billström. The affair centred on the use of domestic workers (nannies and maids) without paying employment (payroll) tax, employer's contribution (Swedish: arbetsgivaravgifter), unpaid TV licences and other issues. On October 14, 2006 Maria Borelius resigned after eight days in office, and on October 16, 2006 Cecilia Stegö Chilò resigned after ten days in office. Criminal charges have been filed against Borelius, Billström and Stegö Chilò. The affair has also been widely reported by the international press, with the British Financial Times dubbing it "Nannygate".

== Background ==
The affair concerns several key pieces of Swedish law, politics and society:

- Domestic help:
  - A person who hires someone do work for them is required to report this to the tax authorities and pay a proportion of the wages to the tax authorities – the so-called "employment (payroll) tax, employer's contribution". For employees born after 1940 this tax amounted to 32.28% of the wages in 2006. The part of the economy where such services are rendered without being reported to the tax authorities has been referred to as the informal economy or underground economy.
  - Politically the issue of tax breaks for domestic help, the housemaid debate, has been a divisive one in Swedish politics and society for several years. The new coalition had put forward the idea of introducing such tax breaks, and went on to do so in 2007.
- All persons who own a television set are required to pay a TV licence (Swedish: TV-avgift), if several people live in a household it is enough to pay a single licence. It is a crime for the owner of a television not to pay the TV licence, and punishable with a fine. Previous convictions indicate that the fine is between 1,000 and 3,000 kronor, and the conviction rate has been approximately 50%. The fee is collected by Radiotjänst i Kiruna AB, a private corporation owned by the public service corporations through a non-profit foundation.
- A Member of Parliament (MP) who loses their seat after an election is entitled to parliamentary compensation (Swedish: inkomstgaranti) in order to facilitate the transition from office. This compensation is reduced if the MP receives compensation from another source, such as a salary or other income, the parliamentary compensation is reduced by the same amount. In essence the parliamentary compensation acts as an income guarantee during a transition period.
- A Swedish MP is issued with a credit card from the Riksdag which is only to be used for expenses associated with official business, such as travel and accommodation.

== Maria Borelius ==
=== Nanny ===
On October 7, 2006, the day after the Cabinet of Fredrik Reinfeldt was announced two of the ministers, Maria Borelius and Cecilia Stegö Chilò, voluntarily admitted that they had previously employed persons to take care of their children (nannies) without paying the employment (payroll) tax, employer's contribution (Swedish: Arbetsgivaravgifter). Borelius did not face any judicial inquiry following her admission, since the events occurred more than five years ago, which put it outside of the statute of limitations.

In explanation, Borelius stated that: "I'm a mother of four and I was running my own company. It never would have worked otherwise". However, during interviews with the media Borelius stated that she "would never have been able to afford all the fees" if she also had paid the taxes. This was soon contradicted by Magnus Ljungkvist, member of the Swedish Social Democratic Party and press secretary for the Social Democrats in the Stockholm County administration. According to Ljungkvist's research into Borelius and her husband's income-tax returns, the couple earned SEK 17 million during the 1990s. Moreover, Borelius inherited a house worth SEK 4 million from her father in 1996. Ljungkvist, who used public sources, published his findings on his blog, which was then picked up by mainstream media. Prime Minister Fredrik Reinfeldt initially stated that while he did not think that Borelius explanation was a good one, he still had faith in her abilities as a minister: "She has assured me that she considers it to be wrong to use 'black' services, and that she does not intend to do so in the future. I have tolerated that as an answer", the Prime Minister said. On November 16, 2006 the prosecutor in the case decided to drop any charges against Borelius relating to the matter of untaxed nannies.

=== TV licence ===
On October 11, 2006 it came to light that Borelius had not paid her TV license since her return from the United Kingdom on August 21, 2006 (as resident in the UK, she was of course exempt from TV fees in Sweden even if the couple might be watching TV while staying at the house they kept in Djursholm). On October 12, 2006 Radiotjänst i Kiruna, a private agency tasked with collecting the license fees, filed criminal charges against Borelius and two other ministers of the Reinfeldt Cabinet, Tobias Billström and Cecilia Stegö Chilò.

=== Other issues ===
On October 13, 2006 it was revealed that Borelius is also being investigated by the Swedish Financial Supervisory Authority for financial irregularities concerning the sale of shares in the company Active Biotech where Borelius is a member of the board. Under Swedish law such a transaction must be reported within five days. On the same day it was also revealed that Borelius' husband Greger Larsson owns a vacation home in the resort of Falsterbo in Southern Sweden. However the property is officially registered to "Full Moon Investments Limited", a company based in the tax haven of Jersey. On October 14, 2006 the existence of an apartment in Cannes, France, with a similar arrangement came to light. The apartment in France is registered to "Soleil Investment Limited".

=== Resignation ===
In the afternoon of October 14, 2006 Prime Minister Fredrik Reinfeldt announced that Maria Borelius had tendered her resignation. She also left her seat in the Swedish parliament at the same time.

== Cecilia Stegö Chilò ==
=== Nanny ===
On October 7, 2006, the day after the Cabinet of Fredrik Reinfeldt was announced Cecilia Stegö Chilò voluntarily admitted that she and her husband had previously employed persons to take care of their children without paying the appropriate taxes (Stegö Chilò's announcement coincided with that of Maria Borelius). Stegö Chilò stated: "It's just as well that I say this right away. If you want to remove me because of that, go ahead." Initially Stegö Chilò did not face any criminal or administrative consequences since the events purportedly took place more than five years ago, outside of the statute of limitations. However on October 15, 2006 Per Winborg, head of the Swedish Transport Workers' Union (Swedish: Transportarbetareförbundet) decided to file a criminal complaint with the Swedish police against Stegö Chilò since it could not be certain that the statute of limitations had passed. On November 16, 2006 the prosecutor in the case decided to drop any charges against Stegö Chilò relating to the matter of untaxed nannies.

On the same day Carina Hägg, a Social Democrat and Member of the Riksdag, announced that she was planning to file a complaint against Prime Minister Fredrik Reinfeldt with the Riksdag Constitutional Committee in order to examine how the Prime Minister recruited his ministers. This proposed measure was soon seen as an abuse, or even a misperception, of the duties of the Riksdag Constitutional Committee; the Prime Minister is free to appoint anyone he wants for his cabinet and they all entered office at the same time as he did himself, so the allegation of straying from the Constitution in not checking out people's backgrounds in minute detail is very questionable, as was soon pointed out by newspapers, noted professors of political science and others.

=== TV licence ===
On October 11, 2006 it came to light that Stegö Chilò and her husband had not paid their TV licence for the last 16 years, withholding more than 16,000 kronor from the public service broadcasters. Her husband registered ownership of a television five days before her appointment as minister. As Minister for Culture Stegö Chilò's responsibilities include oversight of the Swedish public service corporations. Stegö Chilò expressed an ambition to repay what she owed with interest. However, on October 12, 2006 Radiotjänst i Kiruna, the agency tasked with collecting the licence fees, announced its intentions to file criminal charges against Stegö Chilò, Tobias Billström and Maria Borelius, all ministers in the Reinfeldt Cabinet at the time. Criminal charges were filed on October 13, 2006.

=== Resignation ===
On October 16, 2006 Stegö Chilò tendered her resignation to Prime Minister Reinfeldt. Lars Leijonborg, Minister for Education and Research in the Cabinet of Fredrik Reinfeldt, took over the responsibilities for Stegö Chilò's portfolio.

== Tobias Billström ==
On October 11, 2006, less than a week after he took office, it was revealed that Tobias Billström deliberately had neglected to pay his TV licence for ten years, despite owning a television. Billström stated that his neglect initially was based on his political standpoint against Public Service, but that he had come to appreciate public service and that he believed that citizens and especially legislators should follow the law. Billström also expressed his ambition to repay his debt with interest. "I chose not to pay, as I didn't think SVT produced good programmes. But you get wiser with the years, and of course I believe that one should follow the laws that have been passed".

However, on October 12, 2006 Radiotjänst i Kiruna, a private agency tasked with collecting the license fees, announced that it would file criminal charges against Billström together with Cecilia Stegö Chilò and Maria Borelius, former ministers in the cabinet of Fredrik Reinfeldt. On October 13, 2006 criminal charges were filed. Billström, in contrast to Borelius and Stegö Chilò, has stated that he intends to remain in office and has no intention of resigning.

Tobias Billström has also admitted using the credit card issued to him by the Swedish parliament for his personal expenses on two occasions. Although he had reimbursed the parliament for these expenses he felt compelled to reveal this because it was wrong in principle. To many in the Swedish public, this admission, though not at all unique, seemed to echo the affair which, about a decade before, had stopped Mona Sahlin from becoming Chairman of the Social Democrat party and Prime Minister. Sahlin had, among other things, paid for some candy (Toblerone) with a government credit card, although she paid the money back right away and it was never seen as a criminal act.

== Andreas Carlgren ==
On October 12, 2006 Minister for Sustainable Development Andreas Carlgren admitted to have received 130,000 kronor too much from the parliamentary income guarantee. In 1998, when Carlgren was forced to leave the parliament he received compensation despite having other sources of income, which are to be deducted from the parliamentary compensation. Carlgren claims to have rectified the mistake on his own, while others in the Centre Party claim that the minister was caught taking simultaneous payments from the parliamentary authorities and that the mistake had to be pointed out to him. Carlgren has rejected this claim, stating that he is the only one who received his mail and therefore the only one who could have known. Furthermore Carlgren said that "A lot of people have made this same mistake. In my case it amounted to quite a lot of money and we agreed that I should pay it back."

== Anders Borg ==
On October 17, 2006 Anders Borg, Minister for Finance, admitted that he employed a female worker in his home without paying taxes. The young woman told Expressen that she worked for the Borg family as a nanny. Borg on the other hand is insistent that she was just a babysitter, and he doesn't believe he broke any laws. Borg has also admitted he had employed several maids without paying taxes between 1997 and 2001. He has also admitted that his family used the services of a young woman from Poland, and that the girl was an illegal alien without permission to work in Sweden. On November 16, 2006 the prosecutor in the case decided to drop any charges against Borg relating to the matter of untaxed nannies.

== Radiotjänst police complaint ==
On October 19, 2006 it was revealed that Christina Jutterström, CEO of the public service broadcaster Sveriges Television, was also involved in the decision to file a police complaint against Maria Borelius, Tobias Billström and Cecilia Stegö Chilò since Jutterström also is chairman of the board of Radiotjänst i Kiruna. Prime Minister Fredrik Reinfeldt commented that he considered it special treatment of persons who are of interest with the media. Lars Lindberg, CEO of Radiotjänst, responded that this case is prejudicial since no one has previously admitted possession of a television retroactively. Eva-Lena Jansson, a Member of Parliament for the Social Democrats, reported the issue to the constitutional committee of the Riksdag since she wanted it to be determined if the Prime Minister's comments were to be considered ministerial interference in the affairs of a government agency. Former Minister for Justice Thomas Bodström has also stated that he considers the comment inappropriate.

== Timeline ==
- October 6, 2006 – The new cabinet is announced. Maria Borelius and Cecilia Stegö Chilò voluntarily disclose the fact that they have used domestic workers without paying employment (payroll) tax, employer's contribution (Swedish: arbetsgivaravgifter).
- October 11, 2006 – It is revealed that Borelius, Stegö Chilò and Tobias Billström had not paid their TV licences for the last 2 months, 16 years and 10 years respectively. It is also revealed that Carl Bildt has a financial interest in Russian oil and gas.
- October 12, 2006 – Andreas Carlgren admits to have received 130,000 kronor too much from the parliamentary income guarantee.
- October 13, 2006 – Radiotjänst i Kiruna, the company with responsibility for the TV licence, files a criminal complaint against Billström, Borelius and Stegö Chilò with the Swedish police. Announcement that Borelius is under investigation by the Swedish Financial Supervisory Authority for financial irregularities. Revelations regarding Borelius' husband's ownership of property.
- October 14, 2006 – Further revelations regarding Borelius' husband's property ownership, Maria Borelius announces her resignation.
- October 16, 2006 – Per Winborg, head of the Swedish Transport Workers' Union (Swedish: Transportarbetareförbundet), files a complaint with the Swedish police against Stegö Chilò for failure to pay employment tax, employer's contribution. Carina Hägg, a Member of Parliament for the Social Democrats, files a complaint with the Riksdag Constitutional Committee regarding PM Reinfeldt's methods of recruiting ministers. Cecilia Stegö Chilò announces her resignation.
- October 17, 2006 – Tobias Billström announces that he intends to remain in office and has no intention of resigning.
- October 19, 2006 – Eva-Lena Jansson, a Member of Parliament for the Social Democrats, files a complaint with the Riksdag Constitutional Committee regarding PM Reinfeldt's comments on Radiotjänst i Kiruna AB's police complaint.
- October 20, 2006 – Ulf Holm, a Member of Parliament for the Green Party, files a complaint with the Riksdag Constitutional Committee regarding Bildt's private economic interests.
- November 16, 2006 – Chief Prosecutor Kent Madstedt decides not to initiate an investigation against Maria Borelius, Cecilia Stegö Chilò and Anders Borg as regards domestic help and unpaid taxes, citing among other factors a lack of evidence and that none of the alleged employees have come forward and admitted participation.

== See also ==
- American politicians:
  - Robert Bork (gave rise to the verb "to Bork")
  - Nannygate matter of 1993
    - Zoë Baird
    - Kimba Wood
  - Linda Chavez
  - Bernard Kerik
  - Harriet Myers
- Vetting
