= Nannygate (disambiguation) =

Nannygate was a 1993 political controversy in the United States wherein the nomination of Zoë Baird, and near-nomination of Kimba Wood, for U.S. Attorney General were withdrawn due to the hiring of illegal aliens as nannies or the failure to pay taxes for them

Nannygate may also refer to similar affairs:

- David Blunkett, British politician, fast tracking a visa application for his family's nanny (2004)
- Bernard Kerik, American law enforcement officer, nominee for Secretary of Homeland Security, who employed an illegal immigrant as a nanny (2004)
- Minister affair at the announcement of the Reinfeldt cabinet, various Swedish political scandals (2006), collectively dubbed 'Nannygate'
  - Maria Borelius, Swedish trade minister, who hired a live-in nanny without paying taxes (2006)
  - Cecilia Stegö Chilò, Swedish culture minister, who also hired a live-in nanny without paying taxes (2006)
- Devyani Khobragade incident
