= Tobias Billström =

Swedish politician (born 1973)

Tobias Billström M
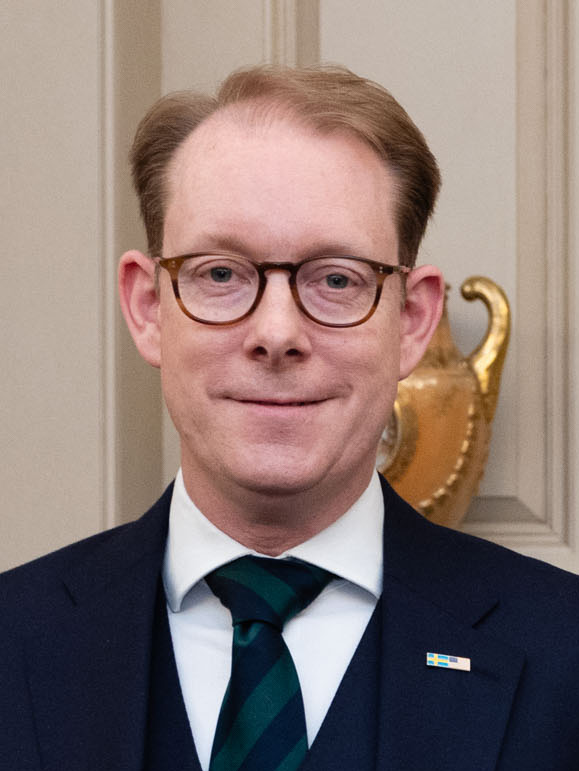
- Billström in 2024

Minister for Foreign Affairs
- In office 18 October 2022 – 10 September 2024
- Monarch: Carl XVI Gustaf
- Prime Minister: Ulf Kristersson
- Preceded by: Ann Linde
- Succeeded by: Maria Malmer Stenergard

Leader of the Moderate Party in the Riksdag
- In office 3 October 2017 – 17 October 2022
- Deputy: Hans Wallmark
- Leader: Ulf Kristersson
- Preceded by: Jessica Polfjärd
- Succeeded by: Mattias Karlsson

First Deputy Speaker of the Riksdag
- In office 29 September 2014 – 11 October 2017
- Monarch: Carl XVI Gustaf
- Preceded by: Susanne Eberstein
- Succeeded by: Ewa Thalén Finné

Minister for Migration and Asylum Policy
- In office 6 October 2006 – 29 September 2014
- Prime Minister: Fredrik Reinfeldt
- Preceded by: Barbro Holmberg
- Succeeded by: Morgan Johansson

Minister for Employment
- In office 7 July 2010 – 5 October 2010
- Prime Minister: Fredrik Reinfeldt
- Preceded by: Sven Otto Littorin
- Succeeded by: Hillevi Engström

Member of the Riksdag
- In office 30 September 2002 – 10 September 2024
- Constituency: Malmö Municipality (2002–2022); Stockholm County (2022–2024)

Personal details
- Born: Tobias Lennart Billström; 27 December 1973 (age 52) Malmö, Sweden
- Party: Moderate
- Spouse: Sofia Åkerman (m. 2009)
- Children: 1
- Education: Lund University (BA) (MA); University of Cambridge (MPhil)

Tobias Lennart Billström (born 27 December 1973) is a Swedish former politician of the Moderate Party. He served as Minister for Migration and Asylum Policy from 2006 to 2014, briefly as Minister for Employment in 2010 and as Minister for Foreign Affairs from 2022 to 2024.

He was Member of the Riksdag from the 2002 general election to 2024, representing both Malmö Municipality (2002–2022) and Stockholm County (2022–2024). In the Riksdag, he served as First Deputy Speaker of the Riksdag from 2014 to 2017.

Billström announced his retirement from politics as a whole on 4 September 2024 and formally stood down on 10 September 2024.

Currently (2025) he works as a business strategist at the defense industry company Nordic Air Defence.

== Education ==
Billström has a Master of Philosophy in Historical Studies from the University of Cambridge and a fil. mag. in history from the University of Lund. While at Cambridge, he was a member of Selwyn College. His essays in history concerned subject areas of British colonial history, especially officers stationed in India and Jamaica. Billström became politically active through the Moderate Youth League. During his studies, he was active in the Confederation of Swedish Conservative and Liberal Students as chairman of Malmö Association FMS Gryphus, and sat on the board of the student union Lunds humanistkår. Billström began his studies in Lund in the Philosophy Department, where he read 20 points scientific basics for Victoria Höög.

== Member of the Riksdag ==
Billström became a Member of the Riksdag at the 2002 Swedish general election; he subsequently became a deputy in the Education Committee, Employment Committee and in the Cultural Committee. In 2003, he became a member of the Education Committee where he received a special responsibility for issues related to higher education and research. In April 2005, Billström became a member of the Social Security Committee and Moderate Party spokesperson on issues related to migration and integration. During the period from 2003 to 2007, Billström was Chairman of the Moderate Party in Malmö. Billström became a member of the board of the Swedish Migration Board in November 2005, a position he left when he was appointed Minister in 2006.

Billström participated as a Member of the Riksdag in the discussion of migration policy. He opposed the temporary asylum law that was implemented by the social democratic Persson cabinet, arguing that the law was not fair and that it was based on collective judgment.

== Minister for Migration and Asylum Policy ==
Billström became Minister for Migration and Asylum Policy on 6 October 2006. Billström was stationed in the Ministry of Justice, unlike his immediate predecessors, who had been stationed in the Ministry for Foreign Affairs.

=== Labour immigration ===
Once it took office in October 2006, the Reinfeldt Cabinet set a new aim for Swedish migration policy, which was to increase the opportunities for labour immigration. Billström emphasised the importance of creating a balance in the policy area where asylum issues often dominate. He also pointed out that labour immigration today is a way to help developing countries beyond the traditional aid.

=== Re-establishment support ===
The government implemented, on 1 August 2007, a re-establishment support to facilitate the repatriation of those who have had their asylum applications rejected.

=== Middle East ===
Billström stated that countries in Europe and the world should help refugees from Iraq who fled during the Iraq War. He emphasised the need for a very strong common asylum and migration policy, and that this could give more Iraqis in need of protection to access this.

The work was given a start with the article that Billström wrote with Cecilia Malmström in the Swedish newspaper Svenska Dagbladet. The message has since been represented to the Council of the European Union and at several international conferences where Billström represented Sweden, including in Geneva and in Sharm el-Sheikh.

From 30 March until 4 April 2007, Billström, as the first European Minister for Migration and Asylum Policy, made a trip to Syria and Jordan to create a picture of the situation of the Iraqi refugees residing there. At the time he was interviewed in Damascus by Sveriges Radio.

In classified documents revealed by Wikileaks, Billström, together with Carl Bildt during the two men's visit to the American Ambassador Ryan Crocker in Baghdad in 2007, reported the Iraqi refugee situation in Sweden, specifically mentioning honour killings and the Swedish opinion of restricting immigration.

=== Controversial statements ===
In an interview about illegal immigrants hidden in Sweden on 18 March 2013, Billström said that "Sometimes we have the impression that the person who is hidden lives with a nice blonde Swedish lady in her fifties or sixties who wants to help. But that's not true. The vast majority of hidden illegal immigrants live with their compatriots who are not blond and blue-eyed."

The statement was severely criticised by both opposition parties as well as the other governing parties in the Alliance coalition government. The leader of the Moderate Youth League, youth league of the Moderate Party, Erik Bengtzboe also criticised the statement, and called for Billström to apologise and to think about what he had said. In the early afternoon on the same day, Billström officially apologised for his statement and said that his words came out in the wrong way, and that what he said was not what he really meant. Fredrik Reinfeldt, the former Prime Minister of Sweden, welcomed Billström's apology.

Some even called for Billström's resignation from the position of Minister for Migration and Asylum Policy. The right-wing Sweden Democrats party leader Jimmie Åkesson welcomed Billström's statement and said "that he was on the right track".

In late 2022, the Swedish foreign minister Tobias Billström called the 2014 recognition of Palestine "premature and unfortunate".

In response to the attacks on Gaza by Israel following the October 7 attacks, 2023, Billström said that Israel's response had been proportionate. This received heavy criticism, from ActionAid and Amnesty. An official complaint was filed by the Swedish Left Party.

== First Deputy Speaker ==
Billström was elected First Deputy Speaker on 29 September 2014. He resigned from the position in October 2017, to become Moderate Party leader in the Riksdag.

== Minister for Foreign Affairs (2022–2024) ==
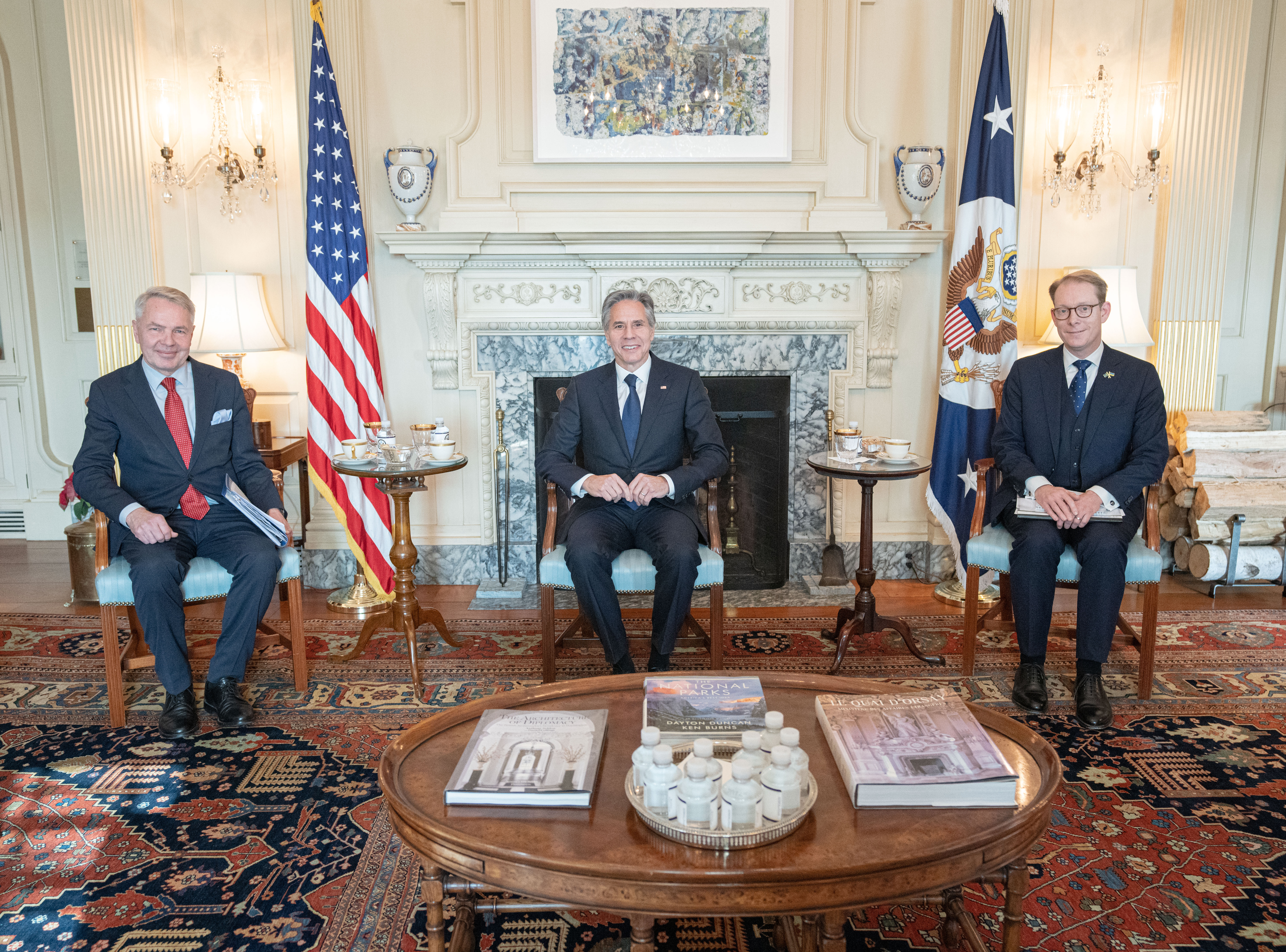
Billström with U.S. Secretary of State Antony Blinken and Finnish Foreign Minister Pekka Haavisto in Washington, D.C., 8 December 2022

On 18 October 2022, he was announced as Minister of Foreign Affairs in the Kristersson Cabinet. On his first day Billström stated that he would not use the term "feminist foreign policy" as his predecessor.

Billström served as Foreign Minister during Swedens historic entry into the North Atlantic Treaty Organization and a priority during his tenure was to secure membership ratification from Turkey and Hungary, who had both previously refused to approve Swedens membership after its application in 2022. In early 2024 both nations finally granted their approval. Billström said Sweden had much to give to the alliance.

On 31 October 2023, Billström expressed support for Israel during the Gaza war, saying that Israel's response was "proportionate, in relation to its right to defend itself."

On 4 September 2024, Billström announced his intent to resign as Minister for Foreign Affairs and as a member of the Riksdag on 10 September in connection with the Opening of the Riksdag. He also stated that he intended to retire from politics entirely.

== Nordic Air Defence ==
On December 3, 2025, the media reported that Tobias Billström had been hired full-time as Director of Strategy and Government Affairs at the defense industry company Nordic Air Defence based in Solna, a title equivalent to business strategist. The company specializes in high-tech and cost-effective anti-drone weapons.

== Other activities ==
- Migration Policy Institute (MPI), Member of the Transatlantic Council on Migration
- Wilfried Martens Centre for European Studies, Member of the Executive Board

== Personal life ==
He is the first openly bisexual person to serve as minister in a Swedish cabinet. He is married to Sofia Åkerman with whom he has one daughter.

=== TV license controversy ===
On 11 October 2006, less than a week after he took office, it was revealed that Billström deliberately had neglected to pay his television licence for ten years, despite owning a television. Billström stated that his neglect was based on his political standpoint against public service, but that he had come to appreciate public service and that he believed that citizens and especially legislators should follow the law. Billström also expressed his ambition to repay his debt with interest. However, on 12 October 2006, Radiotjänst i Kiruna AB, a private agency tasked with collecting the license fees, filed criminal charges against Billström together with two other ministers in the Reinfeldt Cabinet: Cecilia Stegö Chilò and Maria Borelius, with the latter two resigning on 14 and 16 October 2006. Billström stated that he intended to remain in office and had no intention of resigning.

== Honours ==
=== National honours ===
- Sweden: Golden Jubilee Badge Medal of King Carl XVI Gustaf (15 September 2023)

=== Foreign honours ===
- Bulgaria: Order of the Balkan Mountains, 1st Class (9 October 2007)
- Portugal: Grand Cross of the Order of Prince Henry (5 May 2008)
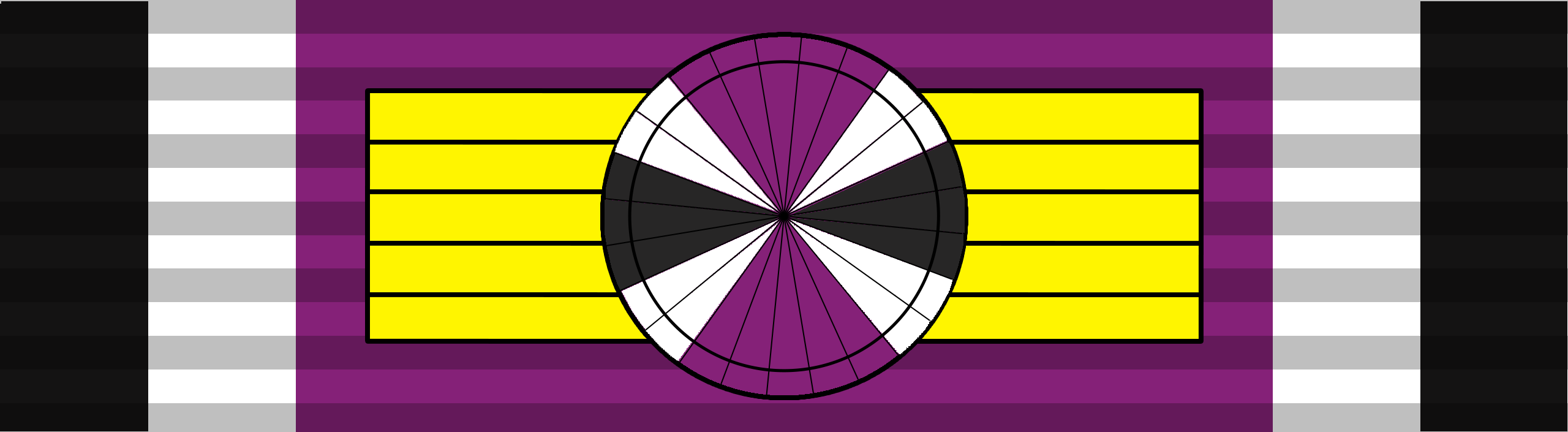
- Jordan: Grand Cordon of the Order of Independence (15 November 2022)
- Estonia: Order of the Cross of Terra Mariana, 1st Class (20 April 2023)
- United Transitional Cabinet of Belarus: Cross of Good Neighbourhood (6 November 2023).
- France: Commander of the National Order of the Legion of Honour (30 January 2024)
- Finland: Grand Cross of the Order of the Lion of Finland (23 April 2024)
- Denmark: Grand Cross of the Order of the Dannebrog (6 May 2024)
- Estonia: Cross of Merit of the Ministry of Foreign Affairs, 1st Class (26 November 2024)

=== Academic honours ===
- Honorary Fellow of Selwyn College, University of Cambridge (2024)

Government offices
Preceded by Barbro Holmberg	Minister for Migration and Asylum Policy; 2006–2014	Succeeded by Morgan Johansson
Preceded by Sven Otto Littorin	Minister for Employment; 2010	Succeeded by Hillevi Engström
Preceded by Ann Linde	Minister for Foreign Affairs; 2022–2024	Succeeded by Maria Malmer Stenergard
Political offices
Preceded by Susanne Eberstein	First Deputy Speaker of the Riksdag; 2014–2017	Succeeded by Ewa Thalén Finné
Party political offices
Preceded by Jessica Polfjärd	Group Leader of the Moderate Party in the Swedish Riksdag; 2017–2022	Succeeded by Mattias Karlsson
