= Reinfeldt cabinet =

Government of Sweden 2006–2014

Fredrik Reinfeldt's cabinet
- 52nd Cabinet of Sweden

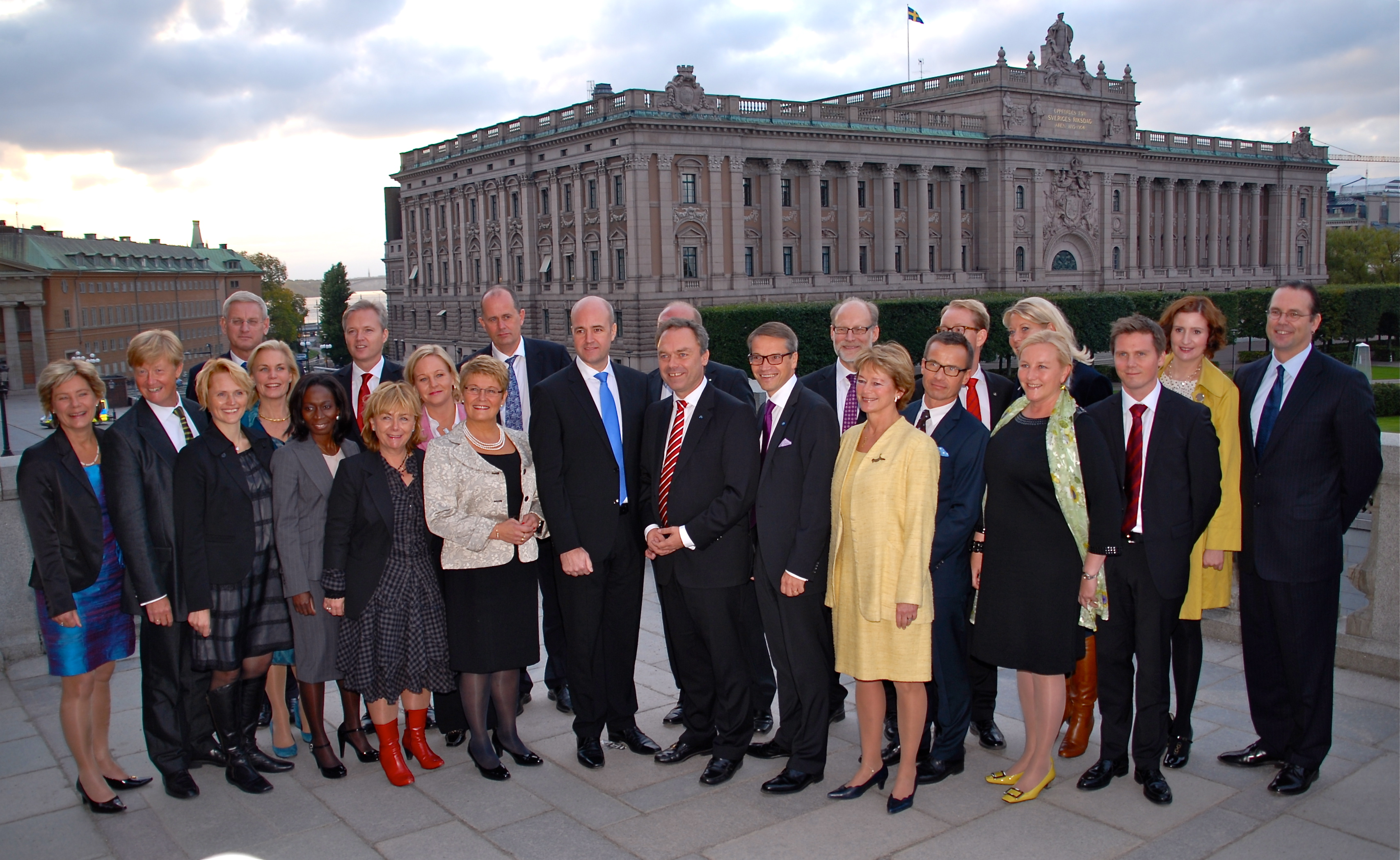
- Reinfeldt cabinet outside Stockholm Palace, 2010
- Date formed: 6 October 2006
- Date dissolved: 3 October 2014

People and organisations
- Head of state: Carl XVI Gustaf
- Head of government: Fredrik Reinfeldt
- Deputy head of government: Maud Olofsson (C; 2006–2010); Jan Björklund (FP; 2010–2014)
- No. of ministers: 25
- Ministers removed: 17
- Member parties: Moderate Party; Centre Party; Liberal People's Party; Christian Democrats
- Status in legislature: Coalition majority (2006–2010); Coalition minority (2010–2014)
- Opposition parties: Social Democrats; Left Party; Green Party; Sweden Democrats (from 2010)
- Opposition leader: Göran Persson (S; 2006–2007); Mona Sahlin (S; 2007–2011); Håkan Juholt (S; 2011–2012); Stefan Löfven (S; 2012–2014)

History
- Incoming formation: 2006 election
- Outgoing formation: 2014 election
- Elections: 2006 election 2010 election 2014 election
- Legislature terms: 2006–2010; 2010–2014
- Predecessor: Persson
- Successor: Löfven I

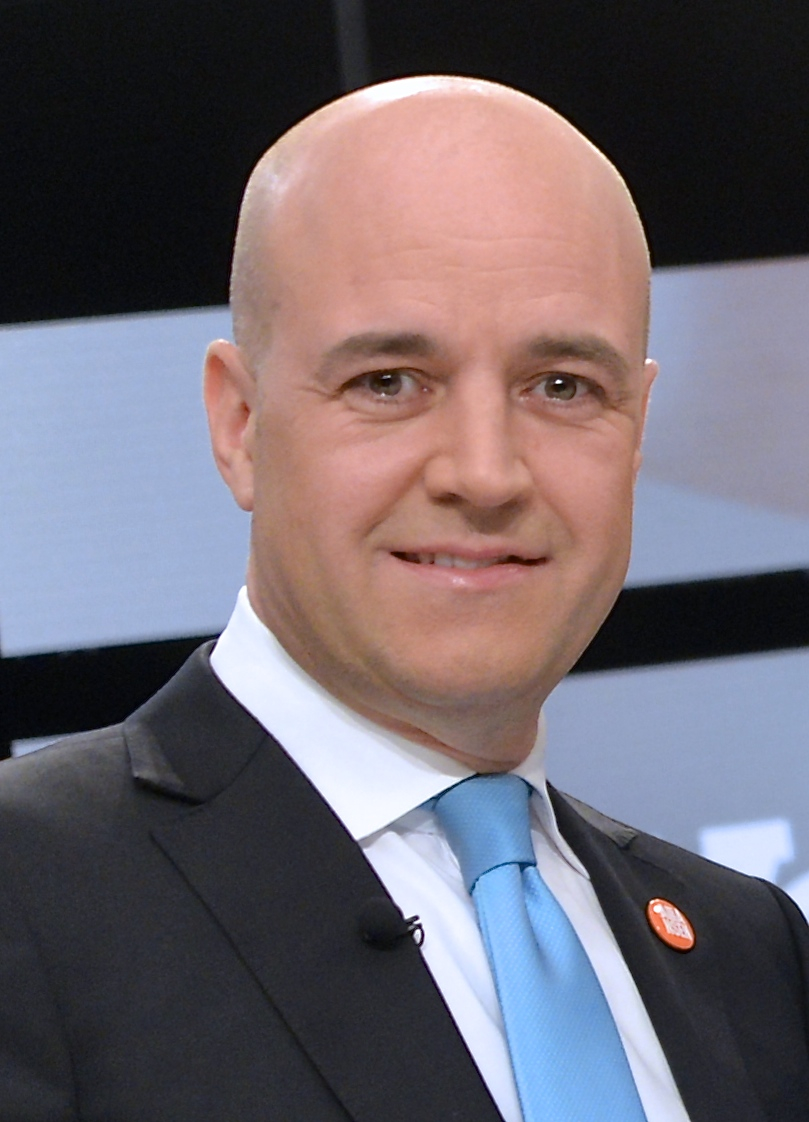
Prime Minister Fredrik Reinfeldt.

The Reinfeldt cabinet (Swedish: regeringen Reinfeldt) was the government of Sweden from 6 October 2006 to 3 October 2014. It was a coalition government between the four parties in the centre-right Alliance for Sweden: the Moderate Party, the Centre Party, the Liberal People's Party, and the Christian Democrats, led by Prime Minister Fredrik Reinfeldt of the Moderate Party. It was the longest-serving consecutive non-Social Democratic led government since the first cabinet of Erik Gustaf Boström from 1891 to 1900.

The cabinet was installed following the 2006 general election which ousted the Social Democrats after twelve years in power. It began as a majority government, but continued as a minority government after the 2010 general election. Following a defeat in the 2014 general election, it was succeeded by the centre-left Löfven I cabinet.

== Ministers ==
Portfolio	Minister	Took office	Left office	Party
Prime Minister's Office
Prime Minister	Fredrik Reinfeldt	6 October 2006	3 October 2014	Moderate
Deputy Prime Minister not a separate minister post	Maud Olofsson	6 October 2006	5 October 2010	Centre
Deputy Prime Minister not a separate minister post	Jan Björklund	5 October 2010	3 October 2014	Liberals
Minister for European Affairs	Cecilia Malmström	6 October 2006	22 January 2010	Liberals
Minister for European Affairs	Birgitta Ohlsson	2 February 2010	3 October 2014	Liberals
Ministry of Justice
Minister for Justice	Beatrice Ask	6 October 2006	3 October 2014	Moderate
Minister for Migration and Asylum Policy	Tobias Billström	6 October 2006	29 September 2014	Moderate
Ministry for Foreign Affairs
Minister for Foreign Affairs	Carl Bildt	6 October 2006	3 October 2014	Moderate
Minister of Commerce and Industry	Maria Borelius	6 October 2006	14 October 2006	Moderate
Minister of Commerce and Industry	Sten Tolgfors	24 October 2006	6 September 2007	Moderate
Minister of Commerce and Industry	Ewa Björling	12 September 2007	3 October 2014	Moderate
Minister for International Development Cooperation	Gunilla Carlsson	6 October 2006	17 September 2013	Moderate
Minister for International Development Cooperation	Hillevi Engström	17 September 2013	3 October 2014	Moderate
Ministry of Defence
Minister for Defence	Mikael Odenberg	6 October 2006	5 September 2007	Moderate
Minister for Defence	Sten Tolgfors	5 September 2007	29 March 2012	Moderate
Minister for Defence	Catharina Elmsäter-Svärd	29 March 2012	18 April 2012	Moderate
Minister for Defence	Karin Enström	18 April 2012	3 October 2014	Moderate
Ministry of Health and Social Affairs
Minister for Health and Social Affairs	Göran Hägglund	6 October 2006	3 October 2014	Christian Democrats
Minister for Elderly and Children Welfare	Maria Larsson	6 October 2006	3 October 2014	Christian Democrats
Minister for Public Administration and Housing	Stefan Attefall	5 October 2010	3 October 2014	Christian Democrats
Minister for Social Security	Cristina Husmark Pehrsson	6 October 2006	5 October 2010	Moderate
Minister for Social Security	Ulf Kristersson	5 October 2010	3 October 2014	Moderate
Ministry of Finance
Minister for Finance	Anders Borg	6 October 2006	3 October 2014	Moderate
Minister for Financial Markets	Mats Odell	6 October 2006	5 October 2010	Christian Democrats
Minister for Financial Markets	Peter Norman	5 October 2010	3 October 2014	Moderate
Ministry of Education and Research
Minister for Education	Lars Leijonborg	6 October 2006	12 September 2007	Liberals
Minister for Education	Jan Björklund	12 September 2007	3 October 2014	Liberals
Minister for Schools	Jan Björklund	6 October 2006	12 September 2007	Liberals
Minister for Higher Education and Research	Lars Leijonborg	12 September 2007	17 June 2009	Liberals
Minister for Higher Education and Research	Tobias Krantz	17 June 2009	5 October 2010	Liberals
Minister for Gender Equality	Nyamko Sabuni	5 October 2010	21 January 2013	Liberals
Minister for Gender Equality	Maria Arnholm	21 January 2013	3 October 2014	Liberals
Ministry of Agriculture
Minister for Agriculture	Eskil Erlandsson	6 October 2006	3 October 2014	Centre
Ministry of the Environment
Minister for the Environment	Andreas Carlgren	6 October 2006	29 September 2011	Centre
Minister for the Environment	Lena Ek	29 September 2011	3 October 2014	Centre
Ministry of Enterprise, Energy and Communications
Minister for Enterprise	Maud Olofsson	6 October 2006	29 September 2011	Centre
Minister for Enterprise	Annie Lööf	29 September 2011	3 October 2014	Centre
Minister of IT and Energy	Anna-Karin Hatt	5 October 2010	3 October 2014	Centre
Minister for Infrastructure	Åsa Torstensson	6 October 2006	5 October 2010	Centre
Minister for Infrastructure	Catharina Elmsäter-Svärd	5 October 2010	3 October 2014	Moderate
Ministry of Integration and Gender Equality
Minister for Integration and Gender Equality	Nyamko Sabuni	6 October 2006	5 October 2010	Liberals
Ministry of Culture
Minister for Culture	Cecilia Stegö Chilò	6 October 2006	16 October 2006	Moderate
Minister for Culture	Lena Adelsohn Liljeroth	24 October 2006	3 October 2014	Moderate
Ministry of Employment
Minister for Employment	Sven Otto Littorin	6 October 2006	7 July 2010	Moderate
Minister for Employment	Tobias Billström	7 July 2010	5 October 2010	Moderate
Minister for Employment	Hillevi Engström	5 October 2010	17 September 2013	Moderate
Minister for Employment	Elisabeth Svantesson	17 September 2013	3 October 2014	Moderate
Minister for Integration	Erik Ullenhag	5 October 2010	3 October 2014	Liberals

=== New ministries ===
- Ministry of Employment, belonged to the Ministry of Industry, Employment and Communications in the cabinet of Göran Persson.
- Ministry of Culture, belonged to the Ministry of Education and Culture in the cabinet of Göran Persson.
- Ministry of Environment was before called the Ministry of Sustainable Development.
- Ministry of Integration and Gender Equality, belonged to the Ministry of Justice and the Ministry for Foreign Affairs in the cabinet of Göran Persson.

== Party breakdown ==
Party breakdown of cabinet ministers:

- Moderate Party
13
- Centre Party
4
- Liberal People's Party
4
- Christian Democrats
3

== Policy of the cabinet ==
The new government was presented on 6 October 2006. The following reforms were proposed:

- Communication and transportation:
  - The tax on automotive fuels will be raised because of inflation adjustment, by 9 öre per litre for gasoline and 6 öre per litre for diesel (excluding VAT).
- Culture:
  - The new government plans to reintroduce entrance fees to the country's 21 state-operated museums.
  - Third-party liability premiums for vehicle insurance will be raised.
  - The current operator's license for the public service broadcasters Sveriges Television, Sveriges Radio and Sveriges Utbildningsradio will come up for renegotiation in three years, instead of six as negotiated with the outgoing government.
- Education:
  - The reform of the secondary education (gymnasium) which was to take effect from 1 January 2007 will be scrapped and instead the new government will start planning for a deeper reform to take place some time before 2010.
- Government agencies:
  - The following government agencies will be closed down: Swedish Integration Board (Swedish: Integrationsverket), National Institute for Working Life (Swedish: Arbetslivsinstitutet), Swedish Animal Welfare Agency (Swedish: Djurskyddsmyndigheten) and the County Labour Boards (Swedish: länsarbetsnämnderna).
  - All agencies are being scrutinized for reformation.
  - Heads of agencies to be made into merit based appointments.
- Foreign aid:
  - The monetary foreign aid's goal and what countries receiving aid is being reconsidered.

== Controversies and resignations ==
On 7 October 2006, the day after the new cabinet was announced two of the ministers, the Minister of Foreign Trade Maria Borelius and the Minister for Culture Cecilia Stegö Chilò, admitted that they had previously employed persons to take care of their children without paying the appropriate taxes. On 11 October 2006 it came to light that Cecilia Stegö Chilò and her husband had not paid their TV license for the last 16 years. On 12 October 2006 it emerged that two other ministers in the cabinet had neglected to pay the television license; Maria Borelius and the Minister for Migration and Asylum Policy, Tobias Billström. Radiotjänst i Kiruna AB, the private agency tasked with collecting the license fee, filed criminal charges against Cecilia Stegö Chilò, Maria Borelius and Tobias Billström.

On 14 October 2006 Maria Borelius resigned as Minister of Foreign Trade. On 16 October 2006, just two days after Maria Borelius' resignation, Minister for Culture Cecilia Stegö Chilò resigned as well.

The Minister for Defence, Mikael Odenberg, resigned on 5 September 2007 as he thought the budget cuts his department would face were to high.

On 29 March 2012 Minister for Defence, Sten Tolgfors, resigned due to Project Simoom.

== Public perception ==
In public opinion survey conducted by Aftonbladet/Sifo in late 2006, the Swedish public was asked to rate each of the new ministers on a 5-graded scale. The average result for the 22 ministers was 2.93. This is higher than any of the rates that the Social Democratic Persson cabinet ever received during its years in power, and the highest ratings ever since the surveys started in 1996.

From the 2006 Swedish general election the opinions for the Reinfeldt cabinet have declined steadily from a level of about 51% down to a level about 40%, which election researchers generally explain as more than what could be expected due to normal inter-election popularity fall. Center-right newspapers in Sweden criticize the cabinet for not being pedagogically proficient, while the opposition newspapers just connects the impopularity of the cabinet with the scandals and the performed practical politics.

== Implemented reforms ==
- Working tax cuts
- Considerably raised fees for unemployment funds, linked to the rate of unemployment among the members of each fund (introduced January 2007, abolished January 2014) resulting in large membership losses of unemployment funds and trade unions
- Municipal allowance
- Deduction for certain household services, so-called RUT deduction
- Abolished compulsory military service
- High Schools reforms and new grading system for the entire school system
- Reforming the legal framework of the National Defence Radio Establishment (FRA-law)
- Implemented the Enforcement Directive (IPRED)
- Defence Act of 2009
- Abolished the state monopoly on pharmaceuticals
- Deregulated railroad traffic
- Radio frequencies for mobile broadband in 800 MHz band
- Liberalisation of the Alcohol Law
- Abolition of the Swedish Cinema Office
- Abolition of compulsory student union
- Deductability of gifts to nonprofit organisations
- Reforms of the health insurance system
- Decreased restaurant VAT from 25 to 12 percent, to the same level as for any other food.
- Legalisation of same-sex marriage
- Corporate tax rate lowered from 26.3% to 22%.

Preceded by Persson cabinet	Cabinet of Sweden; 2006–2014	Succeeded by Löfven I cabinet
