= Nannygate =

1993 political affair in the USA

"Nannygate" is a popular term for the 1993 revelations that caused two of President Bill Clinton's choices for United States Attorney General to become derailed.

In January 1993, Clinton's nomination of corporate lawyer Zoë Baird for the position came under attack after it became known that she and her husband had broken federal law by employing two people who had immigrated illegally from Peru as a nanny and chauffeur for their young child. They had also failed to pay Social Security taxes for the workers, the so-called "Nanny Tax", until shortly before the disclosures. While the Clinton administration thought the matter was relatively unimportant, the news elicited a firestorm of public opinion, most of it against Baird. Within eight days, her nomination lost political support in the U.S. Congress and was withdrawn.

The following month, Clinton's choice of federal judge Kimba Wood for the job was leaked to the press, but within a day it became known that she too had employed someone who had immigrated illegally to look after her child. Although Wood had done so at a time when such a hiring was legal, and had paid Social Security taxes for the worker, the disclosures were enough to cause the immediate withdrawal of Wood from consideration. The Clinton administration then said that the hiring practices for household help would be examined for all of the more than thousand presidential appointments under consideration, causing the whole process to slow down significantly. Determined to choose a woman for the Attorney General post, Clinton finally selected state prosecutor Janet Reno, who was confirmed and served through all eight years of the administration.

The Nannygate matter caused wealthy Americans to ask each other if they too had a "Zoë Baird problem", as the hiring of undocumented immigrants and the paying of household help off the books were both commonplace. Two fault lines, gender and class, were exposed in the discussion over Nannygate: in the former, a double standard was seen wherein female appointees faced a greater risk of being questioned and disqualified based upon their childcare arrangements, while in the latter, affluent professional women who could afford live-in childcare arrangements were seen as trying to get away with an illegal act. Nannygate-type controversies have subsequently affected other political appointees both in the U.S. and in other countries.

== The Baird nomination ==
President-elect Bill Clinton had vowed to assemble an administration that "looked like America", and it was widely assumed that one of the major cabinet posts would go to a woman. In particular, he wanted to nominate one for the position of United States Attorney General, something women's political action groups were also requesting. No woman had previously served in this post. His choice, whose nomination was announced on December 24, 1992, was Zoë Baird, a 40-year-old senior vice president and general counsel at Aetna Life and Casualty Company who had previously worked in the Justice Department during the Carter administration.

Little known before the nomination (Clinton had not met her until their interview), Baird was a skilled networker who had been the protégé of several powerful Washington insiders, including Clinton transition team leader Warren Christopher and once-and-future White House Counsel Lloyd Cutler. Picking Baird gave Clinton the ability to satisfy the women's groups' desires while still showing independence by not choosing one of their preferred selections. Despite the lack of familiarity and getting a lukewarm response from some Clinton backers – those in the legal public interest community said "Zoë who?" and her corporate sympathies discouraged liberals – Baird was expected to gain confirmation in the U.S. Senate. Baird and her husband, Yale Law School professor Paul Gewirtz, had a three-year-old son.

On January 14, 1993, a page-one story in The New York Times broke the news that Baird had hired a married pair of illegal aliens from Peru, Lillian and Victor Cordero, between 1990 and 1992. Lillian had served as the nanny for Baird's son and Victor had served as a part-time driver. Furthermore, Baird had not paid Social Security taxes for the couple, until making a lump-sum payment earlier in January 1993. Baird had brought forward this information willingly to transition officials and authorities performing background checks; she said that she had thought that the fact that they were sponsoring the couple for citizenship made the hiring acceptable, and that they could not pay the taxes for people who were not yet in the country legally. (Baird's immigration lawyer would dispute some aspects of exactly when the sponsorship request took place.)

This was the first time a presidential cabinet nominee had faced such an issue. While the Clinton transition team had found out about the matter during their vetting of Baird, they had underestimated the seriousness of its impact. Their attitude about Baird's infraction was that it was a technical violation and that 'Everybody does it'. Clinton operatives initially thought the Baird revelation was no big deal and would quickly lose the attention of the media and public.

Employment of illegal aliens was not uncommon at the time, but in Baird's case it was especially bad public relations, since the Attorney General was in charge of the Immigration and Naturalization Service (INS). Baird's wealth – she made $500,000 a year in her job and together with her husband had a combined income of $600,000 – made her, in the context of the early 1990s recession, an unsympathetic figure to not be paying taxes. Moreover, Baird and Gewirtz had been wealthy enough to afford legal child care, but instead had paid the Corderos $250 a week plus board, well below minimum wage. The news brought about an immediate and large-scale negative reaction. As Guardian U.S. correspondent Martin Walker later wrote, "[Baird and Gewirtz] were the overpaid yuppies and ubiquitous lawyers whom American voters had come to resent."

On January 16, Baird paid $2,900 in fines for the infractions to the INS. This was on top of the $8,000 in back Social Security taxes she had paid earlier. George Stephanopoulos, the transition communications director, said that "President-elect Clinton has complete confidence in Zoë Baird."

Some in the Clinton inner circle persisted in believing that Baird's offense was akin to a traffic ticket in seriousness, but Democratic senators told them otherwise; Senate Judiciary Committee chair Joe Biden of Delaware likened it more to a "freeway crash."

Baird met with Biden twice, both times leaving his office in tears, although Biden publicly stated that he did not think the matter would prevent her nomination. Baird actually had more immediate support from ranking member Orrin Hatch, who called it "no big deal." This reflected a considerable degree of Republican support for Baird, as they decided she was more in tune with their stance on some issues than a replacement would likely be.

Appearing before the Judiciary Committee on January 19, Baird apologized for having knowingly broken the law: "In my hope to find appropriate child care for my son, I gave too little emphasis to what was described to me as a technical violation of law." She added that, "People are fairly questioning if there are classes of individuals who hold themselves above the law. I do not." Baird's statement that her husband had handled many of the legal issues surrounding the Corderos' employment drew little support for her. Overall, the questioning of Baird was tougher from Democrats on the committee than Republicans, again reflecting the latter's support for Baird. At the close of the initial testimony, Baird's confirmation still seemed quite possible.

As the inauguration of Bill Clinton took place on January 20, the nomination crisis was reaching its final phase, with Biden telling Clinton at a luncheon following the ceremony that the next day or two would be crucial. But political and public opposition continued to mount. Calls opposing the nomination flooded the switchboards of members of Congress. Senator David Boren of Oklahoma reported getting a thousand calls to his office, with 80 percent of them against the nomination. Senator Paul Simon of Illinois also received a thousand calls. Senator Patrick Leahy of Vermont said, "In 18 years in the Senate, I had never seen so many telephone calls, spontaneously, in such a short period."

Television crews staked out the New Haven home of Baird. As one top Senate official later stated, "There were phone calls to offices, local editorials. The people were just way ahead of us." The issue created a firestorm on conservative talk radio, then emerging as a potent force in American politics. Talker Rush Limbaugh was especially involved in the issue, for instance weighing in to say that Baird's "blame-it-on-the-husband" defense was a "feminazi" ploy. A USA Today/CNN/Gallup poll showed that 63 percent of the American public did not think Baird should be confirmed; the reaction was broad, with majorities of Republicans and Democrats, men and women, and young and old all opposing it.

Clinton faced a choice of either quickly jettisoning her, and risk appearing weak, or defiantly continuing to back her, and opposing a popular groundswell; he opted to wait and see a little more. There was also much confusion about when exactly Clinton had learned of the Baird problem, with Christopher saying he had informed Clinton of it in some manner during the transition and Clinton saying he had not. This led to a "What did the President know and when did he know it" grilling of Stephanopoulos on January 21 during his first news conference as White House Communications Director. The treatment of Stephanopoulos got rough and his evasive answers bordered on nonsense.

A second round of Judiciary Committee hearings were also taking place on January 21, and by then, Baird was politically isolated, with no major groups coming to her defense. A growing number of senators came out in opposition to Baird during the day, including two Republican members of the Judiciary Committee and influential centrist Democrats John Breaux of Louisiana and David Boren of Oklahoma. Baird gamely continued to smile and testify well into the evening, but as Stephanopoulos later wrote, "She didn't know it yet, but she was toast." Biden called Clinton and told him the nomination was lost.

On January 22, 1993, two days after Clinton had assumed the presidency, the White House announced in the middle of the night the withdrawal of Baird's nomination.

Clinton now publicly stated that he had been informed of Baird's hiring of the illegal aliens after discussing the position with her but before actually nominating her. He had not halted the process to gain all information but rather had erred by going through with the nomination in order to meet a self-imposed Christmas deadline for naming his cabinet. On January 23, Anna Quindlen used the term "Nannygate" in her syndicated column and it soon gained wide-scale use.

While Lillian and Victor Cordero had done their jobs well (before hiring them, Baird had made several attempts to employ U.S. citizens, but none had worked out), on January 22 the INS said it sought to question them and very likely deport them. The couple had previously separated and were about to be divorced. Lillian Cordero agreed to leave the country and return to Peru, under a 30-day "voluntary departure" program. Victor Cordero first went into hiding, hoping to stay in the country; his lawyer said he had been in the wrong place at the wrong time and that, "He doesn't understand why he's being singled out." But by January 29, he too had voluntarily left the U.S. for Peru. Neither of them ever appeared in the media. Although illegal domestics were rarely deported unless they had been involved in crimes, the INS maintained that the couple were treated no differently than any other illegal aliens who were brought to their attention.

== The Wood near-nomination ==
On February 4, 1993, the Clinton White House made it known via deliberate background statements to several major newspapers that 49-year-old United States federal judge Kimba Wood of the United States District Court for the Southern District of New York would be his new choice for Attorney General. However, no official announcement or nomination was being made, pending the completion of background checks and to gauge reaction to the pick. White House officials indicated that First Lady Hillary Clinton had insisted that the position still be filled by a woman. Wood, who was prominent in New York social circles, was married to Time magazine writer Michael Kramer and the couple had a six-year-old son.

However, later that day, investigations by the office of the White House Counsel and the FBI background check were completed, and Clinton and the White House learned that she had employed an illegal alien to look after her son, even though she had done it when it was still legal to do so. The immigrant, from Trinidad, had been hired in March 1986, several months before enactment of the Immigration Reform and Control Act of 1986 made hiring of illegal aliens unlawful. The nanny obtained legal status in December 1987, and overall worked for Wood for seven years.

Clinton decided the nomination could not go forward, and the next day, February 5, Wood publicly withdrew herself from consideration.

The case was different from the Baird one in that Wood had not broken immigration law and had paid Social Security taxes for the person. Nevertheless, the White House feared reaction from Congress and the public, as well as that from radio and television talk shows, in the apparent, if not actual, repetition of the Baird controversy, and asked Wood to withdraw. A further burden was the disclosure that while she was a student in London, Wood had trained for five days as a Playboy bunny. The White House was annoyed with Wood, because they said that when they had initially asked her if she had a "Zoë Baird problem," she had responded in the negatory. Allies of Wood gave a starkly different account and said that she had been fully forthcoming about the details of her dealings with the immigrant. According to a Gallup Poll, 65 percent of the American public did not think Wood should have been forced down.

== Other Clinton appointees ==
One of the few men to make the short list for the Attorney General selection, Washington lawyer Charles Ruff, was ruled out of consideration by the White House on February 6, because he had not paid Social Security taxes for years for a woman who cleaned his house.

On February 8, Stephanopoulos broadened the scope of the affair by announcing that the past hiring of an illegal alien would "probably be disqualifying" for applicants to any of the 1,100 presidential appointments that were subject to confirmation by the Senate. As one White House official said, "If you ever knowingly hired an illegal alien, that's a killer. If you hired someone who was legal but didn't pay Social Security taxes, you're probably O.K., but only if you come clean and pay the back taxes."

Several Clinton appointees then came forward. Secretary of Commerce Ron Brown said he had failed to pay the taxes for a maid. The Brown case attracted a fair amount of attention, with 40 percent of Americans thinking he should step down as a result (he did not). Secretary of Transportation Federico Peña said he would pay back taxes owed for a part-time babysitter. Other appointees said they had examined their records and were clean. Stephanopoulos himself came under attention, but said the cleaner he had hired was from a cleaning company. The matter resulted in a slowdown of hiring for all positions, in what Secretary of Defense Les Aspin called a "chilling effect". One-third of the nominations for the U.S. State Department were held up while being examined for the question.

Some other female Clinton cabinet-level appointees escaped Nannygate by virtue of their personal circumstances. Secretary of Health and Human Services Donna Shalala was unmarried with no children, while Secretary of Energy Hazel O'Leary and Ambassador to the United Nations Madeleine Albright had children who were grown. Carol Browner, Clinton's pick for Administrator of the Environmental Protection Agency and someone who did have a young child, avoided Nannygate problems by simply never having used a nanny.

== The Reno nomination ==
On February 11, 1993, Janet Reno was nominated for the post. Clinton had known of her since her days with the groundbreaking Miami Drug Court, where as state attorney she had worked with public defender and Clinton brother-in-law Hugh Rodham, but otherwise although qualified for the job had no federal experience and was relatively obscure. Reno was 54 years old, had never married and had no children, and, as Clinton later wrote, "Public service was her life." Without the chance of a nanny problem, and with her mowing her own lawn reducing the chances for an immigrant problem, Reno was the perfect choice after the Baird and Wood failures. In addition, Reno's down-to-earth image contrasted with the wealthy corporate lawyer Baird and the socially prominent Wood. (Reno would instead face something often experienced by unmarried woman of her age, speculation about her sexual orientation.)

In making the announcement, Clinton said that he had considered men for the post and that "I never felt hamstrung by any commitment, even though I did want to name a woman Attorney General." When asked how he would have handled the selection were he to do it all over again, Clinton responded, "I would have called Janet Reno on November 5th."

Reno was unanimously confirmed by the Senate on March 11, 1993, and thus became the first female Attorney General.

Reno remained Attorney General through both of Clinton's terms as president. Wood remained a federal judge. While the ramifications of Nannygate persisted, Baird herself quickly returned to public obscurity. Clinton subsequently appointed Baird to the Foreign Intelligence Advisory Board, and in his 2004 memoir reiterated that the fault for the failed nomination had been his, not hers. Baird hired an American citizen to be her next nanny.

== Political and cultural impact ==
The Nannygate matter did some damage to the Clinton administration politically. A cover of Time magazine, featuring a half-portrait of Baird, was titled "Clinton's First Blunder" and subtitled "How a popular outcry caught the Washington elite by surprise". The Baird nomination was emblematic of other difficulties Clinton had during the transition period and his early days in office, including most prominently the dropping of a promised middle-class tax cut and resistance to his proposal to allow gays in the military. Stephanopoulos later wrote that "We should have never let the Baird nomination get as far as it did, but our systems failed us at every crucial step." And the timing of the announcement of the Wood withdrawal detracted attention from the signing of the Family and Medical Leave Act of 1993, the first legislative achievement of the Clinton administration. While a Gallup Poll showed that only 22 percent of the public said that Clinton's difficulties in naming someone for Attorney General decreased their confidence in his ability to lead the country, overall, Clinton experienced the highest disapproval ratings at the start of any presidency since such polling began. His "presidential honeymoon" period was thus extremely brief.

Clinton's desire to appoint a woman to the post engendered some criticism for devaluing the position to an affirmative action post, and Stephanopoulos later conceded that "we put ourselves in a box". The failure of the Baird and Wood picks, along with Lani Guinier's failed nomination (for unrelated reasons) to Assistant Attorney General for Department of Justice Civil Rights Division a few months later, made Congressional Democrats cautious in endorsing future Clinton personnel choices. When federal judge Stephen Breyer was first considered for a U.S. Supreme Court vacancy in mid-1993, he was not selected, in part because he too had a 'Zoë Baird problem' (he would be nominated and confirmed the following year, following another vacancy).

The Baird case became the first national scandal over child-care arrangements, but the situation that these nominees faced was in part at least a common one to Americans. Two-thirds of American women with school-age children were in the workforce and three-fifths of married men with children had working wives. They all needed some form of day care, and with there being no organized or subsidized day care system in the U.S., many families turned to arrangements within the underground economy. That this administration ran into this problem was considered ironic, given that Bill and Hillary Clinton were the first dual-career couple to occupy the White House.

Once the Nannygate matter broke into the news, the question "Do you have a Zoë Baird problem?" became frequently asked by Americans of each other in casual conversation, with many answers being in the affirmative. U.S. Census Bureau and Internal Revenue Service data indicated that only one-quarter of people who employed household help paid Social Security taxes to the workers, and that even figure may have been higher than the real one due to people not responding to surveys honestly. Most of those doing the hiring did not think about breaking the law or getting caught.

Meanwhile, Baird had graduated within a matter of hours from anonymity to dubious icon. One employment agency head who only hired legal household workers said, "You have no idea, the frustration, sitting here, knocking your head against the wall, trying to do what's right. And then you have a Zoë Baird who exposes the fact that everybody else is breaking the law." The phrase "to have a Zoë Baird problem" became rooted for a while in the vocabulary of the American professional and political classes.

The matter exposed the practices of the barely underground economy of wealthy households and largely illegal immigrant suppliers. The owner of one Manhattan nanny agency stated, "It's just a reality of life that without the illegal girls, there wouldn't be any nannies, and the mommies would have to stay home and mind their own kids." The practice had grown as both married women with children and single working mothers entered the workforce in large numbers during the 1980s, with the extended hours and long commutes of many professional positions further exacerbating it. The Irish and Central and South American immigrant population of domestic workers was augmented by those from the Philippines, China, Ireland, and Poland. People hiring nannies may have preferred women without papers, who were thought to be easier to find, considerably less expensive, and more loyal if they worked out and easier to fire if they did not. As one Floral Park, Queens, woman said, "I want someone who cannot leave the country, who doesn't know anyone in New York, who basically does not have a life. I want someone who is completely dependent on me and loyal to my family." Americans themselves were largely unwilling to do the jobs.

While some men were affected by Nannygate, most of the public commentary revolved around its effect on women. The February 10, 1993, op-ed page of The New York Times, which carried considerable Nannygate coverage in general, was exclusively devoted towards discussing it as a women's issue. The press themselves came in for some criticism in this respect, with the group Fairness and Accuracy in Reporting complaining that the Times and other media outlets focused on the effect of Nannygate on white, upper-middle-class women, and excluded the perspective of the actual immigrant childcare workers. Stuart Taylor, Jr., in his March 1993 piece "Inside the Whirlwind: How Zoë Baird Was Monstrously Caricatured for the Smallest of Sins, Pounded by Press and Popular Righteousness, and Crucified by Prejudice and Hypocrisy" for The American Lawyer, concluded that Baird was done in by a political-media culture bent on populism and symbolic blood sport and that she was penalized for being honest. He also said Baird had fallen victim to "the cold, capricious cruelty of fate".

Two fault lines, gender and class, were exposed in the debate over Nannygate: in the former, a double standard was seen wherein female appointees faced a greater risk of being questioned and disqualified based upon their childcare arrangements, while in the latter, wealthy or upper middle-class professional women who could afford live-in childcare arrangements were seen as trying to get away with a white-collar criminal act. In particular, the competing gendered narratives revolved around whether the affluent Baird was considered "one of us" by women. Baird failed to gain support from some feminists, who believed that as a protégé of powerful Washington insiders, she had not paid her feminist dues. University of Michigan scholar and graduate student Diane Sampson, publishing in a collection entitled "Bad" Mothers: The politics of blame in twentieth-century America, saw Baird as trying to establish motherhood as a 'site' in elaborating her qualifications for Attorney General during her confirmation hearings, an effort that was subverted by her affluence and her earning far more than her husband did. Sampson concluded that "The dissonance between Baird's rhetorical stance and her lived life was jarring" and that her case presented "culturally accepted signifiers of a bad mother".

A modified and fictionalized account of the Baird nomination formed the core of Wendy Wasserstein's 1996 play An American Daughter, which was later made into a 2000 television film. Wasserstein saw the episode, as well as what happened to Wood, as an example of double standards and sexism, and used it as a vehicle to explore the nature and status of American feminism as of the 1990s. She said of its role in illustrating feminist issues, "I mean, if Nannygate hadn't existed, what a great thing to make up as a way of talking about it." An American Daughter became one of Wasserstein's most ambitious works, and also her most political.

Mary Romero, Professor of Justice Studies at Arizona State University, discussed the class aspect in a new 2002 edition of her classic work Maid in the U.S.A.. She saw Nannygate as a follow-on to the long-running "servant problem", and illustrated how labor and immigration laws were still structured so as to benefit employers rather than employees. Taunya Lovell Banks, Professor of Equality Jurisprudence at University of Maryland School of Law, saw Nannygate as also having a racial dimension, in that it illustrated how the professional class exploited domestic workers of color.

In the wake of Nannygate, effective 1995 Congress changed the way taxes for household help are filed, creating a Form 1040 Schedule H that shifting the federal reporting burden from separate documents onto the main return for income taxes. (The new regulations still were more focused on employers than domestic employees.) The full procedure for handling payments of Social Security and Medicare taxes, as well as state and federal unemployment insurance premiums, for household and child-care help remained quite complex, however, and over the following two decades, self-help articles were published with titles such as "How to Avoid Your Very Own Nannygate" and "Time to Come Clean" and with admonitions like "we all know what happened to Kimba Wood and Zoë Baird."

== Later instances ==
Later instances of political problems caused by the hiring of nannies that were in some way illegal have also been dubbed "Nannygate", both in the U.S. and outside it.

In 2001, President George W. Bush nominated Linda Chavez for Secretary of Labor. She was the first Hispanic woman nominated to a United States cabinet position. However, she withdrew from consideration after it was revealed that she had given money to a one-time illegal immigrant from Guatemala who lived in her home more than a decade earlier. Chavez's claims that she had been engaged in an act of charity and compassion rather than employment, and that she was now the victim of the "politics of personal destruction", were not enough to save her nomination. The Chavez case did further illustrate the question of the status of female illegal aliens in households across the nation.

In December 2004, Bernard Kerik was nominated by President Bush to succeed Tom Ridge as United States Secretary of Homeland Security. After a week of press scrutiny, Kerik withdrew his nomination, saying that he had unknowingly hired an undocumented worker and had not paid her taxes. The Times wrote that "the curse of Nannygate" had returned to claim a fourth high-level victim. As Jim Gibbons was campaigning for Governor of Nevada in 2006, it was brought to light that more than ten years earlier, he and his wife Dawn Gibbons had employed an illegal immigrant as a housekeeper and babysitter. Gibbons went on to win the election anyway. By 2009 and the stepping down of Nancy Killefer as nominee for Chief Performance Officer of the United States at the beginning of the Obama administration, at least ten top-level cabinet or other federal appointees had run into trouble over failure to pay the "Nanny Tax". Despite the possible peril it brought, most Americans were still paying their nannies off the books. The problem recurred in the 2010 California gubernatorial election, where candidate Meg Whitman lost despite spending over $140 million of her own money. Her campaign suffered damage during its final two months by the revelation that she had employed an illegal immigrant as a nanny and housekeeper, and by the alleged manner in which she treated (and fired) the housekeeper.

David Blunkett, a British politician, ran into political trouble for fast tracking a visa application for his family's nanny in 2004. In 2006, the Minister affair at the announcement of the Reinfeldt cabinet in Sweden included the quick resignations of Maria Borelius, a Swedish trade minister who had hired a live-in nanny without paying taxes, and Cecilia Stegö Chilò, the Swedish culture minister, who also hired a live-in nanny without paying taxes. The matter was widely reported by the international press, with the Financial Times dubbing it "Nannygate". In 2009, Canadian member of parliament Ruby Dhalla was accused of having employed nannies without proper work permits as required of anyone hiring foreign nationals under the federal caregiver program, and some newspaper headline writers dubbed the resulting controversy as "Nannygate". The 2013 arrest of Devyani Khobragade, Deputy Consul General of the Consulate General of India in New York City, charged with committing visa fraud and providing false statements in order to gain entry to the United States for her nanny, was referred to by some in the American press as "Nannygate".

In February 2019, the State Department spokeswoman, Heather Nauert, who was the White House's choice for United States Ambassador to the United Nations, withdrew herself from consideration due to her having previously employed a nanny who, while legally residing in the country, was not legally permitted to do that work and did not have taxes paid for her at the time. One columnist wrote that "Nauert had a nannygate situation, which would have made the confirmation process much more difficult."

== See also ==
- Nanny Tax

== Bibliography ==
- Balakian, Jan (2010). Reading the Plays of Wendy Wasserstein. Milwaukee: Applause Theatre and Cinema Books. ISBN 978-1-55783-725-7.
- Burke, John P. (2000). Presidential Transitions: From Politics to Practice. Boulder, Colorado: Lynne Rienner Publishers. ISBN 1-55587-916-0.
- Ciociola, Gail (2005). Wendy Wasserstein: Dramatizing Women, Their Choices and Their Boundaries (Reprint of 1998 ed.). Jefferson, North Carolina: McFarland & Company. ISBN 0-7864-2317-X.
- Clinton, Bill (2004). My Life. New York: Alfred A. Knopf. ISBN 0-375-41457-6.
- Harris, John F. (2005). The Survivor: Bill Clinton in the White House. New York: Random House. ISBN 0-375-50847-3.
- Romero, Mary (2002). Maid in the U.S.A. (2nd ed.). New York: Routledge. ISBN 0-415-93541-5.
- Sampson, Diane (1997). "Rejecting Zoe Baird: Class Resentment and the Working Mother". In Ladd-Taylor, Molly; Umansky, Lauri (eds.). "Bad" Mothers: The Politics of Blame in Twentieth-century America. New York: New York University Press. ISBN 0-8147-5119-9.
- Stephanopoulos, George (1999). All Too Human: A Political Education. Boston: Little, Brown and Company. ISBN 0-316-92919-0.
- Walker, Martin (1996). The President We Deserve: Bill Clinton: His Rise, Falls, and Comebacks. New York: Crown Publishers. ISBN 0-517-59871-X.
