= Cecilia Stegö Chilò =

Swedish politician (1959–2025)

Marie Cecilia Stegö Chilò (Swedish pronunciation: [kɪˈloː]; (25 March 1959 – 15 February 2025) was a Swedish politician who served as the Minister for Culture for ten days, from 6 to 16 October 2006. Prior to her appointment as a cabinet member she was Chief executive officer of the Swedish Free Enterprise Foundation, and Director of Timbro, a neoliberal, free-market think-tank. A former journalist and editorialist, she was a member of the Moderate Party. From 2007 she was Chairman of the Advisory Board of the Permanent Platform of Atomium Culture.

== Background ==
Cecilia Stegö was born in Linköping in Östergötland County. She studied political science, economics, law and language. Cecilia Stegö Chilò lived with her husband and two children in Bromma in western Stockholm. She died on 15 February 2025, at the age of 65.

== Professional life ==
In 1982 she was Secretary General of the European Democrat Students in Bonn and London. From 1982 to 1983 she was Vice chairperson of the Confederation of Swedish Conservative and Liberal Students. She worked as a reporter at Norrköpings Tidningar from 1982 to 1984, served as a secretary in the Stockholm County Council from 1984 to 1985, press secretary in the Moderate Party's parliamentary group from 1985 to 1987, speech writer for the Moderate Party leadership from 1987 to 1988 and as a reporter and editorial journalist for the newspaper Svenska Dagbladet from 1989 to 1999. From 2001 to 2002 she was a political commentator at Sveriges Radio.

== Political career ==
Cecilia Stegö Chilò left the Moderate Party in 1995 in protest after the expulsion of the EU-critic Björn von der Esch - this happened in connection with his being against the EMU and against the vision of a tighter federalism in EU affairs. She rejoined the Moderate Party in 2005. Following the 2006 general election on 17 September 2006 the Moderate Party together with three other parties in the Alliance for Sweden gained a majority of the seats in the parliament and were able to form a coalition government. On 6 October 2006 Stegö Chilò was selected by the newly elected Prime Minister Fredrik Reinfeldt to hold the post of Minister for Culture with responsibility for culture, the media and sports in his cabinet. However, during the period 7 to 16 October 2006, a series of media revelations into the newly appointed minister led to her resignation after ten days in office.

=== Political controversies ===
==== Nanny controversy ====
On 7 October 2006, the day after the Cabinet of Fredrik Reinfeldt was announced two of the ministers, Cecilia Stegö Chilò and Maria Borelius, admitted that they had previously employed persons to take care of their children without paying the appropriate taxes. Stegö Chilò stated: "It's just as well that I say this right away. If you want to remove me because of that, go ahead." Neither Stegö Chilò nor Borelius faced any criminal or administrative consequences since the events took place more than five years ago, outside of the statute of limitations.

==== Television licence controversy ====
On 11 October 2006, it came to light that Stegö Chilò and her husband had not paid their television licence (Swedish: TV-avgift, lit. 'TV fee') for at least 16 years (since records began being kept), withholding more than 16,000 kronor from the public service broadcasters. In Sweden it is a crime for the owner of a television not to pay the TV-licence, and punishable by a fine. However, it is possible to come to an agreement and pay the fee retroactively. Her husband registered ownership of a television five days before her appointment as minister. As Minister for Culture Stegö Chilò's responsibilities include oversight of the Swedish public service corporations. Stegö Chilò expressed an ambition to repay what she owed with interest. However, on 12 October 2006 Radiotjänst i Kiruna AB, a private agency tasked with collecting the licence fees, filed criminal charges against Stegö Chilò together with two other ministers in the Reinfeldt Cabinet: Tobias Billström and Maria Borelius.

In November 2006, she sent a letter to Radiotjänst saying that she had just paid in SEK 22.656. In the letter she refers to an agreement made with the MD of Radiotjänst before the criminal charges were filed. According to the agreement the amount should equal unpaid license fees plus interest and that paying would close the issue.

=== Resignation ===
On 16 October 2006, Stegö Chilò tendered her resignation to Prime Minister Reinfeldt. Lars Leijonborg, Minister for Education and Research in the Cabinet of Fredrik Reinfeldt, took over the responsibilities for Stegö Chilò's portfolio until her successor Lena Adelsohn Liljeroth was appointed on 24 October 2006.

In November 2006, she sent a letter to the salary unit within the government. She clarified that even though she might be entitled to keep her salary for some time after her resignation, she did not wish to receive any money.

== Bibliography ==
- Stegö-Chilò, Cecilia (1993). Systemskiftet: en 1800-talshistoria [The System Shift: a 19th century history] (in Swedish). Stockholm: Nerenius & Santérus. ISBN 978-91-88384-19-5.

Preceded by Leif Pagrotsky; Minister for Education and Culture	Minister for Culture; 6 October 2006 - 16 October 2006	Succeeded by Lars Leijonborg; Acting Minister for Culture
