= K-World =

Swedish education company

K-World was a Swedish educational company and owner of a television channel of the same name. The company was founded in 1998 and went bankrupt in 2002. It distributed educational content for internet and television. Conceived as an "IKEA for education", its slogan was "Kunskap åt tv-tittarna" (Knowledge for TV viewers).

== History ==
The company was founded by Swedish television executives Annie Wegelius and Maria Borelius. Their plan was to create an educational company which would use both internet and television as its platforms. For this end they would end up acquiring a private high school (Mobila Gymnasiet) in 2000, with 950 students spread over four schools in Stockholm, Gothenburg and Malmö. Its main investors were Investor and the Rausing family.

Their TV channel was originally going to be named Kunskaps-TV (Knowledge TV) and became one of the new channels that would make up the digital terrestrial platform in Sweden, when the government granted licenses on 25 June 1998. By spring 1999, the company employed 20 staff, which ballooned to 100 within a few months. The eponymous K-World channel started broadcasting on 31 October 1999; the web portal launched on the same day. Its director-in-chief from 1 January 2000 was Albert Bonnier (no relation to the 19th century press magnate of the same name, who fled Dagens Nyheter. When the channel launched, it opted for a model similar to that of Discovery Channel, with high-quality documentaries and informative programmes, as well as music and travel fillers. On launch night, the founders expected to have the channel available in one million households and believed that digital television would witness a fast rise, however, as of January 2000, only 3,000 families had a digital terrestrial decoder, far below their expectations. It was also made available on conventional cable (mostly analogue networks), where it reached, at most, a cumulative audience of 300,000 viewers. With a limited audience, there was no advertising revenue.

In 2000, K-World appointed car manufacturer Volvo to begin an e-training plan, but its staff learned that they had no internet connection before it began.

In August 2001, K-World acquired the Swiss education company Viviance, after which 3i became one of its shareholders.

K-World quickly understood that using television was a strategic failure for delivering e-learning content, causing the company to put up the channel for sale (suggestions included the owners of TV3, TV4 and Kanal 5. That year alone, the channel earned SEK 30 million in earnings thanks to distribution fees from the cable companies that carried it. It also changed its graphics, from yellowish-orange to cherry red. However, no buyer was found and the company was forced to close the channel on 31 March 2002. CEO Patrick Ståhle suggested that, with the closure of the channel, the company should focus on e-learning instead. On 6 May 2002, K-World declared itself bankrupt by orders of the Stockholm District Court. The company lost SEK 700 million in investments. Its founders had also left.
