= Television licensing in Sweden =

Overview of the television licensing system of Sweden

Sweden introduced its first television licence fee in 1956 costing 25 SEK annually, the same year television was introduced to Sweden. Until 1988, the licence fee was administered by a division of the Swedish state-owned telecommunications company Televerket, when that function was taken over by Radiotjänst i Kiruna AB which was jointly owned by the three public broadcasters Sveriges Television, Sveriges Radio and Sveriges Utbildningsradio.

The fee paid for five TV channels, 45 radio channels as well as TV and radio on the Internet. In Sweden, the term "television licence" (Swedish: TV-licens) was replaced by the term "television fee" (Swedish: TV-avgift) in 1967, although Swedish people sometimes still refer to it by the former term. Upon the introduction of colour television in Sweden in 1970, an extra surcharge of 100 SEK per annum was levied on households with at least one colour television set. The colour television surcharge was abolished in 1990 and the annual television fee was therefore increased to compensate for revenue shortfall.

The fee was collected by Radiotjänst from every household containing a TV set, and possession of such a device must be reported to Radiotjänst as required by law. One fee is collected per household regardless of number of TV sets, in the home or in alternate locations owned by the household such as summer houses. Although the fee also pays for radio broadcasting, there is no separate fee for radios; the radio license fee, originally introduced in 1907, was abolished on 1 April 1978.

Suggestions of replacing the fee with a mandatory tax which is collected together with electricity and water bills occurred sometimes in the media. One important argument in favour of replacing the fee with said mandatory tax was that the television fee (in the form it existed from 1956–2019) was effectively a regressive tax, since lower income households paid a larger share of their income to the fee as compared to wealthier households. An important rebuttal against implementing the mandatory tax however was that all public TV (and radio) channels in Sweden are neither owned by the state nor are they directly controlled by the government; instead, since 1997, these channels share a common ownership under an independent non-profit foundation called Förvaltningsstiftelsen för Sveriges Radio, Sveriges Television och Sveriges Utbildningsradio.

Around 90% of households have reported that they have a television set and thereby need to pay the fee. However, the number of households not containing a TV set was considered by Radiotjänst to be a lot fewer than the 10% that do not pay licences. The personnel of Radiotjänst i Kiruna AB had no authority to investigate inside households (for instance apartment units on higher floor levels), although from the 1970s until the 1990s, staff from Televerket and subsequently Radiotjänst i Kiruna utilised portable antennas attached to portable signal strength meters to detect analogue television signals emitting from houses and apartment units as a means of detecting suspected non-payment of the television fee from households.

On 14 November 2018, the Riksdag voted to change the licensing system to a general public service tax on personal income, instead of a fee on people owning television sets, which took effect on 1 January 2019. Under the new tax, the maximum possible fee to be charged by said tax is 1300 SEK per person per year (compared with the annual 2400 SEK annual license fee per household for 2018), while people who earn less than 13600 SEK per month will pay a reduced amount, subject to means testing. Companies, legal entities, minors under the age of 18 and people without any regular or taxable source of income (e.g. higher education students receiving financial aid through CSN) will not need to pay any fee at all under the new tax system. Radiotjänst i Kiruna has thus refunded all those who had already paid the old television fee for the year 2019. Also, with said resulting change in the funding of Sweden's public broadcasting system, Radiotjänst i Kiruna as an agency was thus made redundant, where over a transition period lasting until 31 December 2019, Radiotjänst's functions were taken over by the Swedish Tax Agency and the Legal, Financial and Administrative Services Agency.

== Requirement to pay TV fee for Internet access ==
In February 2013, Radiotjänst i Kiruna AB changed their interpretation of the Swedish television fee law. In their new interpretation any personal computer, smartphone or tablet connected to the Internet is also considered a TV set and requires payment of the TV fee. Between then and 13 June 2014, when the Supreme Administrative Court reversed the decisions by lower courts, who agreed with Radiotjänst's interpretation internet connected devices were supposed to be reported as TV sets. The reasoning is that the purpose of a computer is not to receive television broadcasts nor are there any broadcasts on Internet since you have to request that the content is streamed to you.

Radiotjänst on 13 June 2014 stated that no fees for internet connected devices will be repaid. The reason being that until then the legal system supported Radiotjänst's interpretation, even though a superior court had nullified the support.
