= Radiotjänst i Kiruna =

Defunct TV licensing body in Sweden

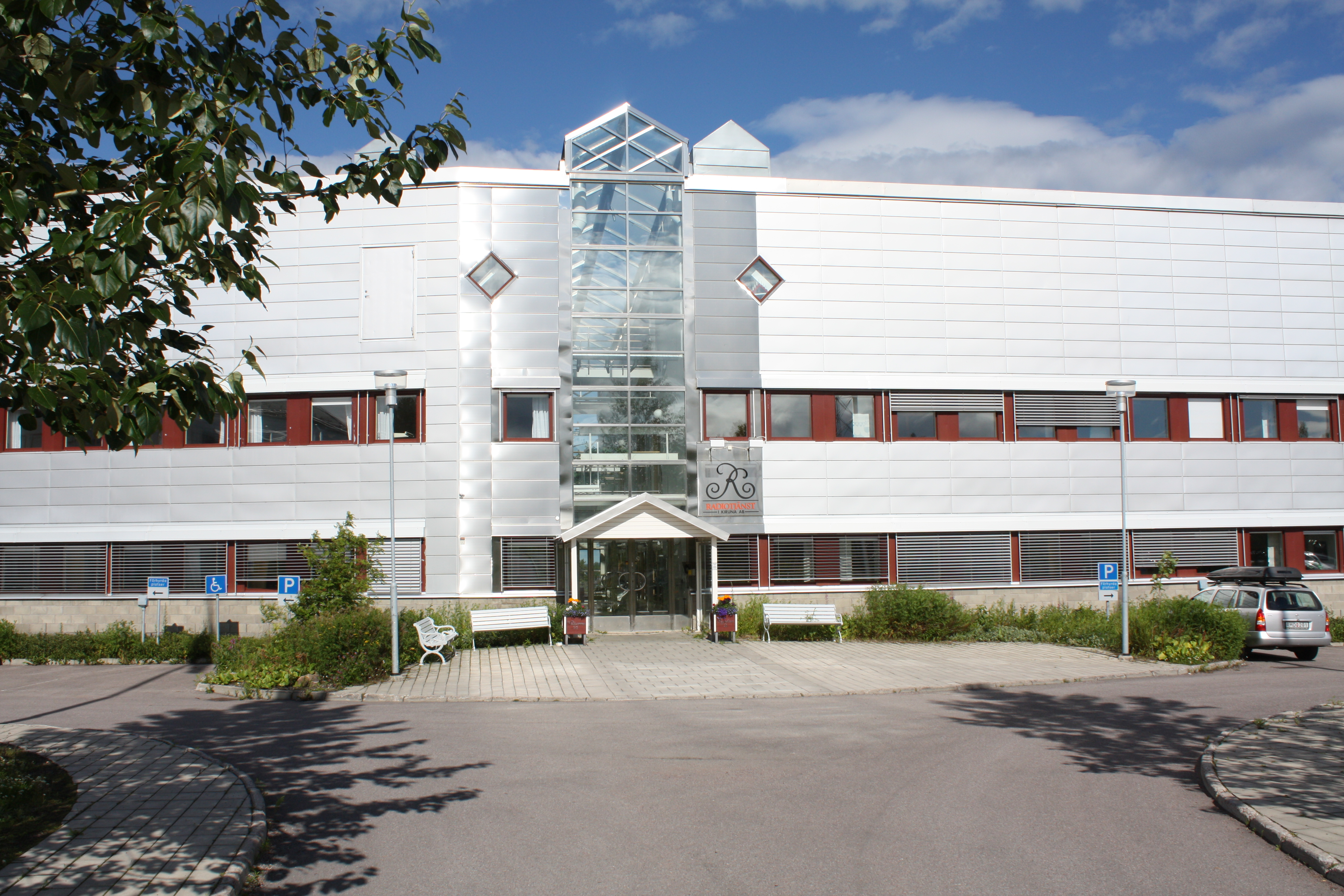
Radiotjänst i Kiruna AB's office building.

Radiotjänst i Kiruna AB (literally "Radio Service in Kiruna") was Sweden's TV licensing body. It was a private corporation, formed in 1988 and based in Kiruna, and upon its formation took over the administration and handling of TV licences from the state-owned telecommunications company Televerket. The company was a subsidiary of the three Swedish public service broadcasters Sveriges Television, Sveriges Radio and Sveriges Utbildningsradio. Under Swedish law, from 1956 until 2019, everyone who owned a television receiver was required to pay the license fee; the last figure was 2400 SEK per annum for the year 2018. The fee was collected by Radiotjänst but administered by the Swedish National Debt Office (Riksgäldskontoret) by means of a special account, the so-called “rundradiokontot”.

This fee previously applied to any household with a television set; even if the device was not used to view television. Even if a household had no way to receive television broadcasts, but owned a device which could theoretically receive a signal (if said signal was present) it was still required to pay the fee.

Radiotjänst claimed that the current regulation for TV tax included any device that could theoretically be configured to receive a streamed video signal since at least one channel of Swedish public service TV was on the Internet in its entirety, but this interpretation was struck down by the Supreme Administrative Court of Sweden on 13 June 2014.

Radiotjänst employed around 120 people, most of whom were located in Kiruna, along with several hundred licensing inspectors stationed around the country, and additional inspectors employed on freelance basis. The TV-license collected around 7 000 million SEK a year (roughly 800 million EUR). The cost of running Radiotjänst amounts to 146 million SEK (2014).

After the Riksdag voted on 14 November 2018 to change the licensing system from a television licence fee to a general public service tax on personal income, Radiotjänst i Kiruna was gradually wound down from then until its formal dissolution on 31 December 2019, with its functions being eventually taken over by the Swedish Tax Agency and the Legal, Financial and Administrative Services Agency.

== See also ==
- Television licence
- Television licensing in Sweden
