= Television licence =

Payment for receiving audiovisual broadcasts

A television licence or broadcast receiving licence is a payment required in many countries for the reception of television broadcasts or the possession of a television set. In some countries, a licence is also required to own a radio or receive radio broadcasts. In such countries, some broadcasts are funded in full or in part by the licence fees. Licence fees are effectively a hypothecated tax to fund public broadcasting.

== History ==
Broadcasting TV financing models in Europe: TV licence + ads TV licence + ads + other public funding TV licence on tax of the electricity bill + ads TV licence on tax of the electricity bill + ads + other public funding public funding + ads public funding without ads specific public tax + ads specific public tax without ads specific public tax + ads + other public funding

Radio broadcasters in the early 20th century needed to raise funds for their services. In some countries, this was achieved via advertising, while others adopted a compulsory subscription model with households that owned a radio set being required to purchase a licence. The United Kingdom was the first country to adopt compulsory public subscription with a licence, originally known as a wireless licence, used to fund the BBC. In most countries that introduced radio licensing, possession of a licence was simply an indication of having paid the fee.

With the arrival of television, some countries created separate television licences. Other countries increased radio licence fees to cover the additional cost of television broadcasting, changing the name from "radio licence" to "TV licence" or "receiver licence". Today, most countries fund public radio broadcasting from the same licence fee that is used for television, although a few still have separate radio licences. Some countries, such as the United Kingdom and Japan, have lower fees for households that only own monochrome television sets. In many countries, elderly and disabled consumers have a reduced or zero licence fee.

Faced with licence fee evasion, some countries chose to fund public broadcasters directly from taxation or via methods such as a co-payment with electricity billing. In some countries, national public broadcasters carry advertising.

In 1989, the Council of Europe created the European Convention on Transfrontier Television. Among other things, this regulates advertising. The treaty came into force in 1993 when it had been ratified by seven countries, including five EU member states. As of 2010, 34 countries have acceded to the treaty.

== Television licensing by country ==
Usage and costs of television licences vary greatly between countries. The Museum of Broadcast Communications in Chicago reports that two-thirds of countries in Europe and half of countries in Asia and Africa use television licences to fund public television. Television licensing is rare in the Americas, largely confined to British Overseas Territories. In some countries, radio channels and broadcasters' websites are also funded by a licence, giving access to radio and online services free of advertising.

== Television licences in Europe ==
Country	TV licence required?	Price per month and notes
Albania	yes	100 Lek (€ 1,05)
Andorra	no	
Armenia	no	
Austria	yes	€15.30–€20 regardless of actual TV ownership
Belarus	no	
Belgium	no	Abolished in 2001 (Brussels and Flanders) and in 2018 (in Wallonia)
Bosnia and Herzegovina	yes	KM 7.50 (€3.83)
Bulgaria	no	Fee in law, never implemented
Croatia	yes	€10.62
Cyprus	no	
Czech Republic	yes	150 Kč (€ 6,17)
Denmark	no	Abolished in 2022
Estonia	no	
Finland	yes	Up to €13.33 (€160 per year) regardless of actual TV ownership
France	no	Abolished in 2022
Georgia	no	
Germany	yes	€18.36 regardless of actual TV ownership.
Greece	yes	€3
Hungary	no	Abolished in 2002
Iceland	no	Abolished in 2007
Ireland	yes	€13.33 (€160 per year)
Italy	yes	€7.50 (€90 per year)
Kosovo	no	
Latvia	no	
Liechtenstein	no	Abolished in 1999
Lithuania	no	
Luxembourg	no	
Malta	no	Abolished in 2012
Moldova	no	
Monaco	no	
Montenegro	no	Abolished in 2008
Netherlands	no	Abolished in 2000
North Macedonia	no	Abolished in 2018
Norway	no	Abolished in 2020
Poland	yes	PLN 294.50 (€69.50) in 2025 (PLN 24.55 (€5.79) per month)
Portugal	yes	€3.02
Romania	no	Abolished in 2017
Russia	no	
Serbia	yes	din. 349 (€2.97)
Slovakia	no	Abolished in 2023
Slovenia	yes	€14.02
Spain	no	
Sweden	no	Abolished in 2019
Switzerland	yes	27.92 Fr (€26.08) (335 Fr per year) regardless of actual TV ownership
Turkey	yes	Electricity bill share abolished, product value-added share ongoing
Ukraine	no	
United Kingdom	yes	colour: £15P/M (€17.58P/M) £180 P/A(€210.95P/A) black and white: £4.88P/M (€5.48P/M) £60.50 P/A (€70.90P/A) from April 1, 2026

=== Albania ===
The Albanian licence fee is 100 lekë per month, paid as part of the electricity bill. This makes up part of RTSH's funding: 58 per cent comes directly from the government through taxes with the remainder from commercials and the licence fee.

=== Austria ===
Under Austria's TV and Radio Licence Law (Fernseh- und Hörfunklizenzrecht), all operational broadcast reception equipment must be registered. Since 1998, the Gebühren Info Service (GIS) has been responsible for licence administration. GIS was renamed ORF-Beitragsservice (OBS) in 2024. It is a fully owned subsidiary of the Austrian public broadcaster, (ORF) and an agency of the Federal Ministry of Finance. GIS aims to inform people about licensing, using a four-channel communication strategy consisting of:

- advertising campaigns in printed media, radio and television,
- direct mail,
- outlets such as post offices, banks, tobacconists and the five GIS Service Centres where people can register,
- field service customer consultants visiting households not yet registered.

In 2007 the total licensing income was €682 million, 66 per cent of which was allocated to the ORF. The remaining 34 per cent was allocated to the federal government and local governments to fund cultural activities. GIS employs 191 people and has approximately 125 freelancers in the field service. 3.4 million Austrian households are registered with the GIS with 2.5 per cent evading the licence.

The television & radio licence fee varies between states. As of 2022, Styria has the highest annual television licence cost, at €343.80, and Salzburg and Burgenland have the highest annual radio licence cost, at €94.92. Annual fees from July 2022 are:

State	Television	Radio
Burgenland	€341.40	€94.92
Carinthia	€330.60	€92.52
Lower Austria	€339.00	€93.72
Upper Austria	€269.40	€75.72
Salzburg	€325.80	€94.92
Styria	€343.80	€94.92
Tyrol	€317.40	€88.92
Vorarlberg	€269.40	€75.72
Vienna	€339.00	€94.20

In 2024, the broadcasting fee was replaced by a household tax that every household pays, currently €15.30 per month. In the federal states of Burgenland, Carinthia, Styria and Tyrol, an additional state tax must be paid - this amounts to between €3.10 and €4.70 per month.

State	Monthly ORF contribution	Monthly State tax	Total
Burgenland	€15.30	€4.60	€19.90
Carinthia	€15.30	€4.60	€19.90
Lower Austria	€15.30	-	€15.30
Upper Austria	€15.30	-	€15.30
Salzburg	€15.30	-	€15.30
Styria	€15.30	€4.70	€20.00
Tyrol	€15.30	€3.10	€18.40
Vorarlberg	€15.30	-	€15.30
Vienna	€15.30	-	€15.30

=== Bosnia and Herzegovina ===
The licence fee in Bosnia and Herzegovina is approximately €46 per year. The Bosnian War and associated collapse of infrastructure caused very high evasion rates. This has partly been resolved by collecting the licence fee as part of each household's monthly telephone bill. The licence fee is divided between three broadcasters:

- 50 per cent to BHRT (Radio and Television of Bosnia and Herzegovina), the main radio and television broadcaster in Bosnia and Herzegovina at national level, and Bosnia's only member of the European Broadcasting Union.
- 25 per cent to RTVFBiH (Radio-Television of the Federation of Bosnia and Herzegovina), a radio and television broadcaster that primarily serves the Federation of Bosnia and Herzegovina.
- 25 per cent to RTRS (Radio-Television of the Republika Srpska), a radio and television broadcaster which primarily serves the Republika Srpska.

=== Croatia ===
The licence fee in Croatia is regulated by the Croatian Radiotelevision Act. This legislation ensures compliance with European broadcasting standards and regulates advertising, limiting HRT to 9 per cent of airtime for commercials.

The fee is mandatory for all owners of broadcast receiving equipment and is legally set at 1.5 per cent of the average national salary. It is the main source of revenue for the national broadcaster Hrvatska Radiotelevizija (HRT). Within HRT, 66 per cent of the licence fee income goes to television and 34 per cent to radio.

=== Czech Republic ===
The licence fee in the Czech Republic is 150 Kč per month for television and 55 Kč per month for radio, amounting to 2460 Kč per year. Paid advertisements are not permitted on television except in narrowly defined circumstances during a transitional period. Each household that owns at least one television pays for one licence, regardless of how many televisions they own. Corporations and the self-employed must pay for a licence for each television and radio.

=== Germany ===
The licence fee in Germany is €18.36 per month (€220 per annum) for all apartments, secondary residences, holiday homes and summer houses. Since 2003 it has been payable regardless of possession or use of television and radio. Businesses and institutions must pay, based on factors including numbers of employees, vehicles and, for hotels, beds. The fee is billed monthly but typically paid quarterly or yearly. It is collected by Beitragsservice von ARD, ZDF und Deutschlandradio which is sometimes criticised for its enforcement measures. Since 2013, only recipients of certain social benefits such as Arbeitslosengeld II or student loans and grants are exempt from the licence fee. People with certain disabilities can apply to pay a reduced fee of €5.83. Low income, in general, is no longer a reason for exemption. Since the fee is billed to a person and not to a dwelling, empty dwellings are exempt.

Nine members of ARD

The licence fee is used to fund the public broadcasters ZDF and Deutschlandradio, as well as the nine regional broadcasters of the ARD network. Together, they run 22 television channels (10 regional, 10 national, 2 international: Arte and 3sat) and 61 radio stations (58 regional, 3 national). Two national television stations and 32 regional radio stations carry limited advertising. The 14 regional regulatory authorities for private broadcasters are also funded by the licence fee, and in some states, non-profit community radio stations get small amounts of the licence fee. Germany's international broadcaster, Deutsche Welle, is fully funded by the German federal government, though much of its new content is provided by the ARD.

Germany's per capita budget for public broadcasting is close to the European average but the total is one of the largest in the world. In 2006, annual income from licence fees was more than €7.9 billion.

The board of public broadcasters sued the German states for interference with their budgeting process, and on 11 September 2007, the Supreme Court decided in their favour. This effectively rendered the public broadcasters independent and self-governing. Public broadcasters have announced that they are determined to use all available ways to reach their "customers" and as such have started a very broad Internet presence with media portals, news and TV programs. National broadcasters abandoned an earlier pledge to restrict their online activities. This resulted in newspapers taking court action against the ARD, claiming that its Tagessschau smartphone app was unfairly subsidised by the licence fee, to the detriment of free-market providers of news content apps. The case was dismissed with the court advising the two sides to find a compromise.

=== Greece ===
The licence fee in Greece is paid through electricity bills. It is charged to every electricity account, including private residences and businesses. There has been discussion of replacing it with a direct licence fee after complaints from people who do not own a television set. An often-quoted joke is that even the dead pay the licence fee, since graveyards have electricity bills.

Licensing income is paid to the state broadcaster, Ellinikí Radiofonía Tileórasi (ERT). In June 2013, ERT was closed down to save money for the Greek government and licence fees were temporarily suspended. Later, NERIT licence fees were reduced to 3 euros per month, a reduction from €4.24 paid before the shutdown. In June 2015, ERT reopened and the licence fee resumed at a rate of €36 per year.

=== Ireland ===
As of 2020, the cost of a television licence in Ireland is €160 per year. The licence applies to premises so a separate licence is required for holiday homes or motor vehicles which contain a television. The licence must be paid for premises that have any equipment that can potentially decode TV signals, regardless of whether they view RTÉ's content. The licence is free to anyone over the age of 70, to some people over 66, to people on a disability allowance, and people who are blind (these licences are paid for by the state). The Irish post office, An Post, is responsible for the collection of the licence fee and commencement of prosecution proceedings in cases of non-payment, but An Post has signalled its intention to withdraw from its licence fee business. The licence fee makes up 50 per cent of the revenue of RTÉ, the national broadcaster with the rest coming from radio and television advertisements. Some RTÉ services have not historically relied on the licence for income, such as RTÉ 2fm, RTÉ Aertel, RTÉ.ie but since 2012 RTÉ 2FM has had some financial support from the licence. The RTÉ Transmission Network operates on an entirely commercial basis.

Five per cent of the licence fee goes to the Broadcasting Authority of Ireland's "Sound and Vision Scheme", which provides funds for programme production and restoration of archive material. From 2011 until 2018, five per cent of RTÉ's licence income was granted to TG4. RTÉ is now required to provide TG4 with programming. The remainder of TG4's funding is from direct state grants and commercial income.

=== Italy ===
The licence fee in Italy is charged to each household with a television set, regardless of use, and to all public premises with one or more televisions or radios. In 2016, the government reduced the licence fee to €100 per household and incorporated it into electricity bills in an attempt to eliminate evasion, and as of 2018, the fee was €90.00.

Sixty-six per cent of RAI's income comes from the licence fee (up from about half of total income seven years ago), with another twenty-five per cent from advertising, which is aired pretty regularly every 20 minutes or so, with very few exceptions (football matches, special events, Eurovision Song Contest)

=== Montenegro ===
Under the Broadcasting Law of December 2002, each household and legal entity in Montenegro able to receive radio or television programmes is required to pay a broadcasting subscription fee. The monthly fee is €3.50, or €42.00 per annum. Funds are distributed,

- 75 per cent to the republic's public broadcasting radio and television services,
- 10 per cent to support local public broadcasting services
- 10 per cent to support commercial broadcasting services,
- 5 per cent to support the Broadcasting Agency of Montenegro.

The Broadcasting Agency of Montenegro collected the fee through telephone bills, but after the privatization of Telekom, the new owners, T-com, announced they would not administer the fee after July 2007.

=== Poland ===
As of 2026, the licence fee in Poland for a television set is 30.50 zł per month, or for radio only is 9.50 zł per month. One licence is required per household, irrespective of the number of sets. The fee is waived for people over 75. Public health institutions, nurseries, educational institutions, hospices and retirement homes need only one licence per building or building complex they occupy. Commercial premises need a licence for each set, including radios and televisions in company vehicles.

Around 60 per cent of the fee goes to Telewizja Polska with the rest going to Polskie Radio. Advertisements are allowed between programmes on public television but it is not permitted to interrupt its programmes for advertisements.

The licence is collected and maintained by the Polish post office, Poczta Polska. There is a major problem with licence evasion in Poland: in 2012 around 65 per cent of households evaded the licence fee (compared to an average of 10 per cent in the European Union), and in 2020, only 8 per cent of Polish households paid the licence fee. Reasons for non-payment include the opt-in system in which there is no effective means to compel people to register or to prosecute those who fail to do so. Licensing inspectors, who are usually postal workers, do not have the right of entry to inspect premises and must get the owner's or occupier's permission to enter. Also, the public media are frequently accused of producing pro-government propaganda and not being independent public broadcasters. Due to widespread non-payment of the licence fee, in 2020 the government gave a 2 billion złoty grant for public media.

=== Portugal ===
From September 2003, the Rádio e Televisão de Portugal (RTP) was financed through government grants and the "Taxa de Contribuição Audiovisual" (Portuguese for Broadcasting Contribution Tax), charged monthly through the electricity bills. Following the 2010–2014 Portuguese financial crisis, government grants ended and RTP was financed only through the "Taxa de Contribuição Audiovisual" and advertising. Since July 2016, the fee is €2.85 + VAT per month.

RTP1 can broadcast only 6 minutes of commercial advertising per hour (commercial channels can broadcast 12 minutes per hour). RTP2 and the public radios stations have no commercial advertising. RTP3 and RTP Memória can broadcast commercial advertising on cable, satellite and IPTV platforms but not on digital terrestrial television.

=== Serbia ===
Licence fees in Serbia are bundled together with electricity bills and collected monthly. Current fee is 349 RSD (the newest price, as of August 2024), which is about €3.

=== Slovenia ===
Since June 2013, the annual licence fee in Slovenia is €12.75 per household per month to receive both television and radio services, or €3.77 per month for radio only, regardless of the number of devices capable of receiving television or radio broadcasts. Businesses and the self-employed pay this amount for each set and pay higher rates where they are intended for public viewing rather than private use by employees.

The licence fee is used to fund the national broadcaster RTV Slovenija. In 2007, the licence fee raised €78.1 million, approximately 68 per cent of the broadcaster's operating revenue. RTV Slovenija's advertising income in 2007 was €21.6 million.

=== Switzerland ===
Any household that receives radio or television programs from the Swiss national public broadcaster SRG SSR must be registered and pay licence fees. The fee is CHF 335 per year for TV and radio for single households, and CHF 670 for multiple households, e.g. nursing homes. Swiss citizens living elsewhere in Europe are eligible to purchase a decryption card to view SRG SSR TV channels via satellite, but must also pay a reduced fee of CHF 120 per year to cover distribution costs. Residential licence fees are collected by Serafe AG, a wholly owned subsidiary of the insurance collections agency Secon. Non-payment of licence fees incurs fines of up to CHF 100,000. For businesses, the fee is on a scale based on the company's annual turnover and is collected by the Swiss Federal Tax Administration. The majority of the fee, CHF 1.2 billion, goes to SRG SSR, with the rest going to a collection of small regional radio and television broadcasters.

On 4 March 2018, there was a referendum on whether TV licensing should be scrapped, with the slogan "No Billag", a reference to the previous collector of the licence fees. Parliament have advocated a no vote. Voters overwhelmingly rejected the proposal by 71.6 to 28.4 per cent and in all cantons. Following the vote, the fee was significantly reduced.

=== Turkey ===
A licence fee of up to 16 per cent is paid to the state broadcaster TRT by the producer or importer of the equipment that can receive TRT's broadcasts or on-demand content in any manner including internet. Consumers indirectly pay this fee when purchasing equipment. No registration is required for television receiving equipment, except for cellular phones as mandated by a separate law.

TRT also receives funding via advertisements. Previously a 2 per cent tax was added to monthly electricity bills but this has been abolished.

=== United Kingdom ===
A television licence is required for each household where television programmes are watched or recorded as they are broadcast, irrespective of the signal method (terrestrial, satellite, cable or the Internet). As of September 2016, users of BBC iPlayer must also have a television licence to watch on-demand television content from the service. As of 1 April 2017, after a price freeze that began in 2010, the cost of a licence may now increase to account for inflation. As of April 2026, the licence fee is £180 for a colour and £60.50 for a black and white television licence As it is classified in law as a tax, evasion of licence fees is a criminal offence. 204,018 people were prosecuted or fined in 2014 for TV licence offences: 173,044 in England, 12,536 in Wales, 4,905 people in Northern Ireland and 15 in the Isle of Man.

The licence fee is used almost entirely to fund BBC domestic radio, television and internet services. Money received from the licence represents approximately 75 per cent of the cost of these services, with most of the remainder coming from the profits of BBC Studios, a commercial arm of the corporation which distributes content outside of the United Kingdom, and operates or licences BBC-branded television services and brands. The BBC also receives some funding from the Scottish Government via MG Alba to finance the BBC Alba Gaelic-language television service in Scotland. The BBC used to receive a direct government grant from the Foreign and Commonwealth Office to fund television and radio services broadcast to other countries, such as the BBC World Service radio and BBC Arabic Television. These services run on a non-profit, non-commercial basis. The grant was abolished on 1 April 2014, leaving these services to be funded by the UK licence fee, a move which has caused some controversy.

Channel 4 is also a public television service but it is funded through advertising. The Welsh language S4C is funded through a combination of a direct grant from the Department for Culture, Media and Sport and advertising, and receives some programming free of charge from the BBC. These other broadcasters are much smaller than the BBC.

In addition to public broadcasters, the United Kingdom has a wide range of commercial television funded by advertising and subscription. A television licence is still required of viewers who solely watch such commercial channels, although 74.9 per cent of the population watches BBC One in any given week, making it the most popular channel in the country. A similar licence existed for radio but was abolished in 1971.

== Television licences in Africa ==
=== Ghana ===
The licence fee in Ghana was reintroduced in 2015, and is used to fund the Ghana Broadcasting Corporation (GBC). Households have to pay between GH¢36 and GH¢60 per year for using one or more televisions at home.

=== Mauritius ===
The licence fee in Mauritius is Rs 1,800 per year, collected as part of the electricity bill. The fee provides approximately 60 per cent of the income for the Mauritius Broadcasting Corporation (MBC), with most of the remaining funds coming from television and radio commercials. The introduction of private broadcasting in 2002 has put pressure on MBC's commercial revenues, leading private stations to argue that MBC's dual funding affects their profitability.

=== Namibia ===
The licence fee in Namibia was N$204 (about €23) in 2001. The fee is used to fund the Namibian Broadcasting Corporation.

=== South Africa ===
The licence fee in South Africa is R265 (about €23) per annum (R312 per year if paid on a monthly basis) for television. A concessionary rate of R70 is available for those over 70, disabled persons and war veterans who are on social welfare. The licence fee partially funds the public broadcaster, the South African Broadcasting Corporation (SABC), providing R972 million (almost €90 million) in 2008–9. SABC derives much of its income from advertising. Proposals to abolish licensing have circulated since October 2009. The national carrier hopes to receive funding entirely from state subsidies and commercials.

== Television licences in Asia ==
=== Japan ===
In Japan, the annual licence fee (Japanese: 受信料, jushin-ryo) for terrestrial television broadcasts is ¥14,205 (about €88.34), and ¥24,740 (about €153.85) for those receiving satellite broadcasts. The fee is slightly less if paid by direct debit. There is a separate licence for monochrome TV, and fees are slightly less in Okinawa.

The Japanese licence fee pays for the national broadcaster, Nippon Hōsō Kyōkai (NHK). Every household in Japan with a television set is required to have a licence, but in 2006 non-payment was described as "epidemic" following a series of scandals involving NHK. In 2005, it was reported that "there is no fine or any other form of sanction for non-payment". The NHK Party, often called the Anti-NHK Party, was founded in 2013 as a single-issue political party to oppose the licence fee, with its only policy being to encrypt NHK's broadcast signal, meaning only those who watch NHK pay for it.

=== Pakistan ===
The television licence in Pakistan is Rs 420 (about €1.45) per year, collected as a monthly charge on all electricity bills. The fee plus advertising revenue fund the Pakistan Television Corporation (PTV).

=== South Korea ===
In South Korea, the television licence fee (Korean: 수신료 징수제) is collected for the Korean Broadcasting System and the Educational Broadcasting System. The fee is ₩30,000 per year (about €20.67), and is bundled with electricity bills. It has stood at this level since 1981, and now makes up less than 40 per cent of KBS's income and less than 8 per cent of EBS's income. Its purpose is to maintain public broadcasting in South Korea, and give public broadcasters the resources to do their best to produce and broadcast public interest programs.

== Countries where the TV licence has been abolished ==
The following countries have had television licences, but subsequently abolished them:

=== Australia ===
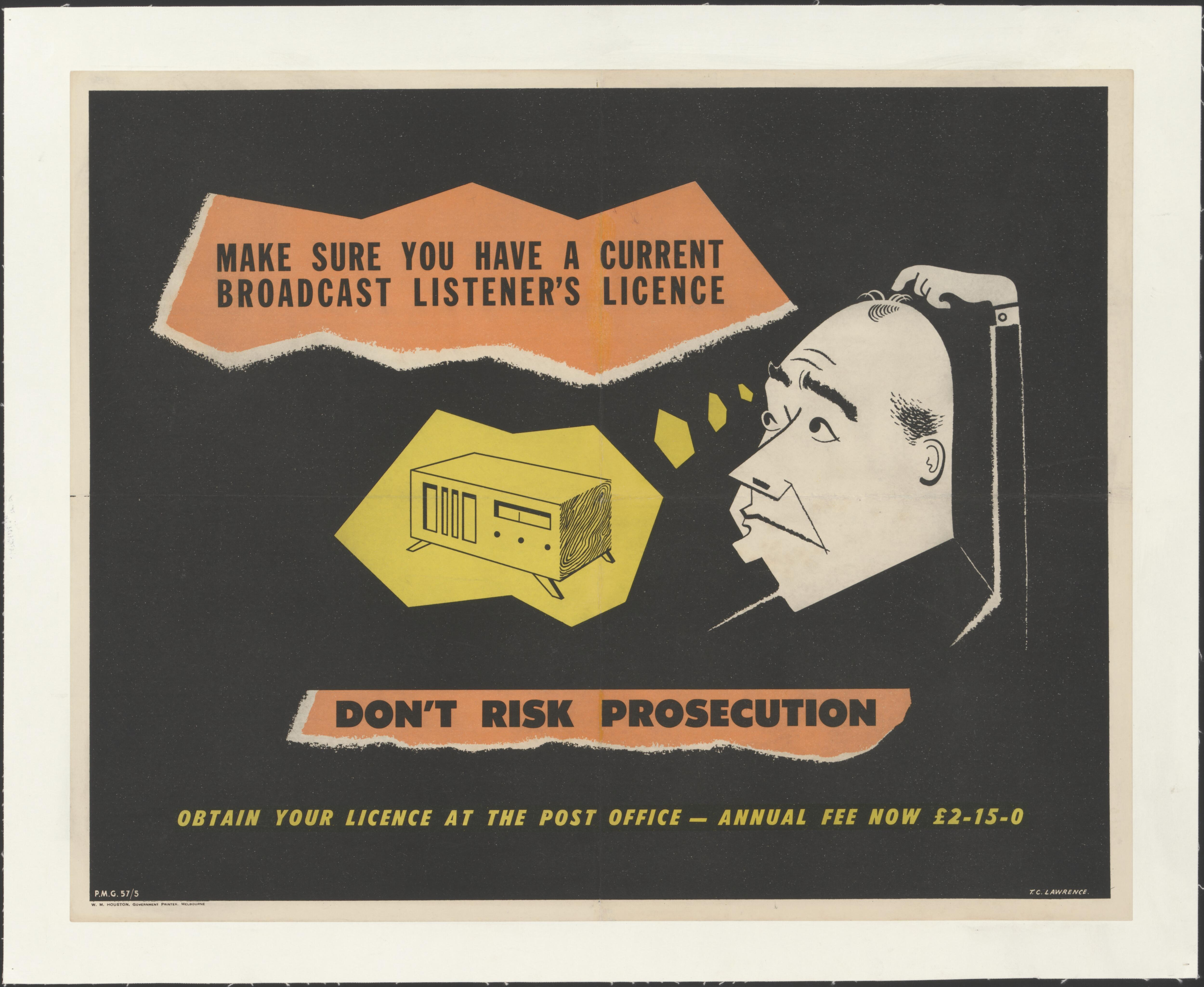
1950s Postmaster-General's Department advertisement regarding broadcast licences

Radio licence fees were introduced in Australia in the 1920s to fund privately owned broadcasters, which were not permitted to sell advertising. With the formation of the government-owned Australian Broadcasting Commission in 1932, licence fees were used to fund ABC broadcasts while privately owned stations were permitted to seek revenue from advertising and sponsorship. Television licence fees were introduced in 1956 when the ABC began television transmissions. In 1964 a television licence, issued on a punched card, cost £6 (A$12); the fine for not having a licence was £100 (A$200).

All licence fees were abolished on 18 September 1974 by the Whitlam government on the grounds that the near-universality of television and radio use meant that public funding was fairer. Since then, the ABC has been funded by government grants, now totalling around A$1.13 billion per year, plus its own commercial activities (merchandising, overseas sale of programmes, etc.).

=== Belgium ===
==== Flemish region and Brussels ====
The Flemish region of Belgium and Brussels abolished its television licence in 2001. The Flemish broadcaster VRT is now funded from general taxation.

==== Walloon region ====
From 1 January 2018, the licence fee in the Walloon region (encompassing the French and German-speaking communities) was abolished. Licences in effect at that time remained payable until their expiration but were not renewed thereafter.

Prior to its abolition, the fee in Wallonia was €100.00 for a television, while household radios were exempt. One licence was required per household, though each vehicle equipped with a radio required a separate car radio licence. Revenue was used to fund the region's French and German-language public broadcasters, RTBF and BRF.

=== Bulgaria ===
A fee for use of television and radio was included the fee in the Bulgarian Radio and Television Law passed in the 1990s. Following public criticism, the president vetoed the law. The Bulgarian National Assembly retained the power to impose a fee but added a temporary measure funding Bulgarian National Television (BNT) and Bulgarian National Radio (BNR) directly from the national budget. This funding mechanism has been retained since then.

=== Canada ===
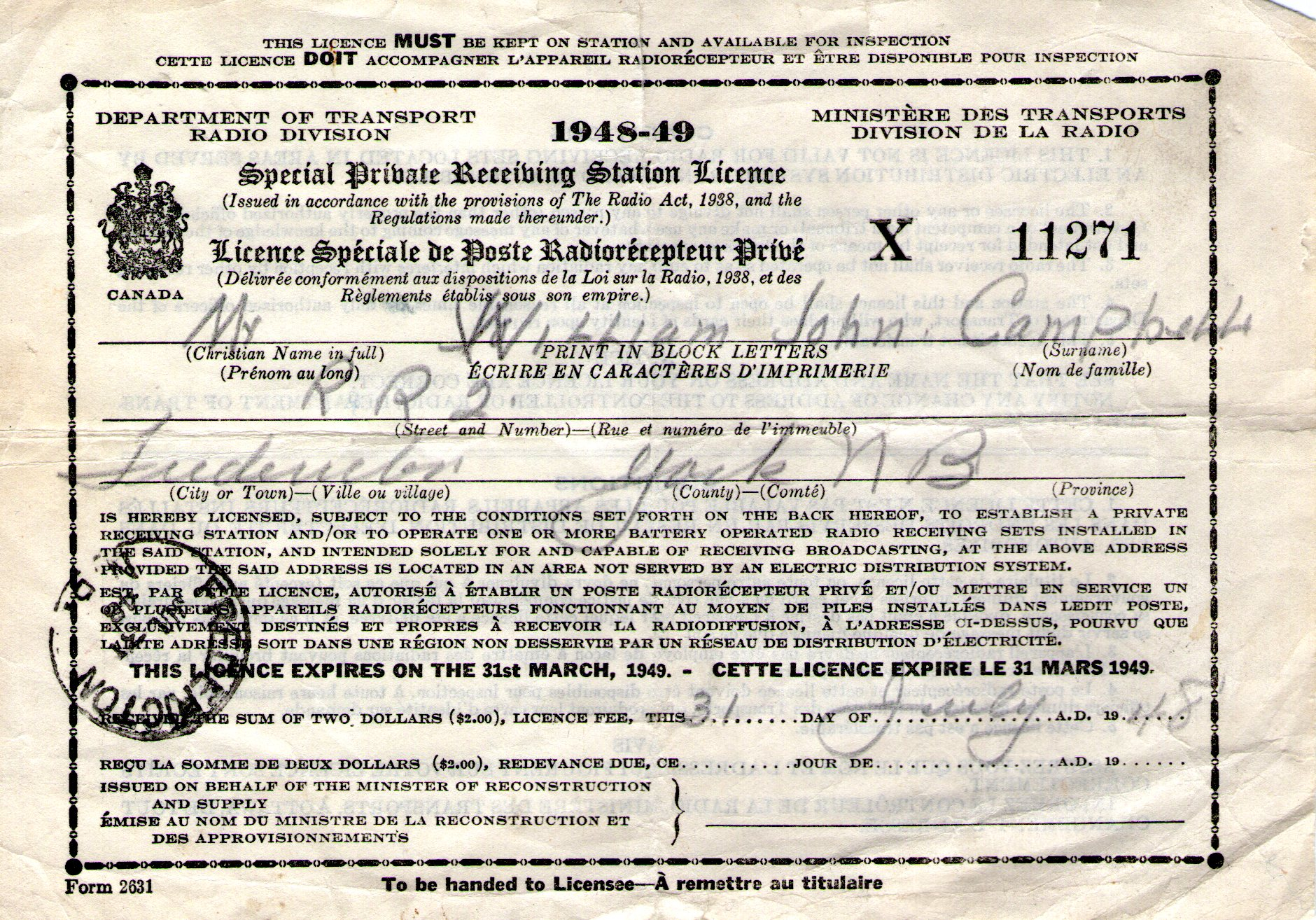
From 1922 to 1953 individual members of the public were required to pay for annual Private Receiving Station licences to legally receive broadcasting stations.

The Radiotelegraph Act 1913 required anyone possessing a radio receiver to hold an "Amateur Experimental Station" licence, and pass an "Amateur Experimental Certificate of Proficiency", demonstrating the ability to send and receive Morse code at five words per minute. In January 1922 the government introduced a Private Receiving Station licence for people who only intended to receive radio, rather than transmit. The receiving station licences initially cost $1 per year. Over time this increased to $2.50 to cover radio and television broadcasts by the Canadian Broadcasting Corporation (CBC). The licence fee was abolished in 1953 and replaced with a 15% excise tax on television equipment (including sets, picture tubes, and parts) to fund the CBC. This excise tax was phased out in 1958, with the CBC's funding shifting primarily to parliamentary appropriations.

=== Cyprus ===
Cyprus had an indirect tax for CyBC, its state-run public broadcasting service, paid through electricity bills dependent on home size. It was abolished in the late 1990s and CyBC is now funded by advertising and government grants.

=== Denmark ===
Until 2022 a Danish media licence fee of 1353 kr (€182) per year was charged for any devices that could receive broadcast television. The majority of the licence fee funded the national radio and television broadcaster DR, with a smaller proportion funding TV 2's regional services. The media licence was abolished in 2022. Funding for DR is now provided through general taxation. TV 2 is now funded through advertising revenue, and it receives indirect subsidies through favourable loans from the Danish state.

=== Finland ===
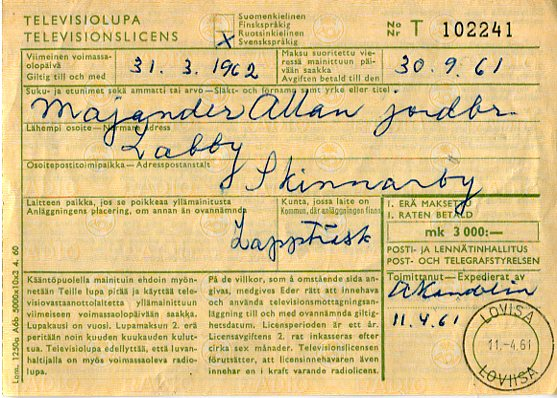
Stamped in Loviisa. The price for half a year was 3,000 Mk in 1960s.

The television fee in Finland was between €244.90 and €253.80 per year for each household with a television. It was the primary source of funding for Yleisradio (Yle). In 2013 it was replaced with the Yle public broadcasting tax (Finnish: yleisradiovero, Swedish: rundradioskatt), a progressive income tax up to €160 per person (2026). People with low incomes and under the age of eighteen years are exempt from the tax. Residents of Åland did not have to pay the tax until 2020, but have been paying a media tax since 2021, which is currently (2026) at 128 euros per year.

=== France ===
Until 2022 a broadcasting licence fee (contribution à l'audiovisuel public) funded Radio France and France Télévisions. People under the age of 21, under 25 and in full-time education, and those who had a household income below a certain threshold were exempt from the fee. The fee was abolished in 2022 and replaced with direct funding from the French Treasury.

=== Gibraltar ===
Until 2006 television licence fees provided funds to the Gibraltar Broadcasting Corporation (GBC). The licence fee was scrapped due to the low amount of fees. Even before the abolition of the licence fee, the majority of GBC's funding came as a grant from the government.

=== Hungary ===
In Hungary, licence fees nominally exist, but since 2002 residential fees have been paid from the state budget. This means that funding for Magyar Televízió and Duna TV comes directly from taxation. Commercial venues such as hotels and bars also had their fees paid between 2002 and 2007, but since then they have required a payment per television set.

=== Hong Kong ===
Hong Kong previously had a radio and television licence fee for Radio Television Hong Kong (RTHK) and Rediffusion Television, costing 36 Hong Kong dollars per year. RTHK is now funded by the Hong Kong Government.

=== Iceland ===
The television licence fee for Iceland's state broadcaster RÚV was abolished in 2007 and replaced with a poll tax of 22,200 kr. from everyone who pays income tax, regardless of whether they use television and radio. The tax must be paid only by persons between the ages of 16 and 69.

=== India ===
India introduced a radio receiver licence system in 1928 for All India Radio (AIR) Akashvani. Television licensing began in 1956–57. In 1976, public television was separated from AIR as a separate company, Doordarshan. In the 1970s and 1980s, radio licences cost INR 15 per year and television licences cost INR 50. The wireless licence inspector from the post office was authorised to check every house and shop for a Wireless Licence Book, and to issue penalties or seize the receiving equipment for non-payment. In 1984, the licensing system was withdrawn. AIR and Doordarshan are both funded by the Government of India and by income from advertising.

=== Indonesia ===
A radio tax for RRI funding was introduced in 1947, during the Indonesian National Revolution. The television fee was introduced soon after TVRI started broadcasting in 1962. The radio tax was abolished in the 1980s. The television fee continued into the 1990s. Its abolition started after public protests about the company that collected the fee, which was run by the Indonesian President's son, but areas such as Bandung and Surabaya continued to have a television fee throughout the 1990s. A "broadcasting fee" (Indonesian: iuran penyiaran) was included in legislation in 2002 but has not been implemented. Public radio and television are currently funded through a combination of advertising and funds from the state budget.

=== Israel ===
Licence fees were the primary source of revenue for the Israel Broadcasting Authority when it was the state broadcaster. Every household was charged ₪ 345 (€73) for a television licence and car owners were charged ₪ 136 (€29) for a radio licence. The television licence was abolished in 2015, but a radio licence is still required of car owners. Since the 1980s, the television programs of the Israeli Broadcasting Authority were sponsored by commercial entities, and the airing of Public service announcements in a pseudo-commercial format became widespread. Both of these practices, while forbidden by the BBC model of television licence, were also found in continental European public broadcasters, albeit in a smaller scope than under the IBA. Their use in Israel caused a widespread public sentiment that the licence fee failed in its goal of ensuring that public broadcasting is free of commercial interests.

The Israel Broadcasting Authority was replaced by the Israeli Broadcasting Corporation in May 2017. Its radio stations carry advertising and some of its television programmes are sponsored by commercial entities.

=== Liechtenstein ===
An annual licence was required between 1978 and 1998 for households with broadcast receiving equipment. The income was divided between PTT and the Swiss national broadcaster, SRG. Since 1998, an annual government grant for public media is administrated by the Mediakommision.

The sole radio station in the principality, Radio Liechtenstein, was founded as a private commercial music station in 1995. It was nationalised in 2004 under Liechtensteinischer Rundfunk to create a domestic public broadcasting station. It is funded by commercials and the public broadcasting grant.

=== Malaysia ===
The annual television licence fee for television in 1990 was at RM 24, previously RM 36 in 1986 and RM 12 in 1985, while the radio licence fee in 1990 was at RM 12; unchanged since the 1960s. The licence fee for the former was also the lowest in the world as of 1989. The licence fee for monochrome televisions in 1985 was at RM 24.

Licences for home-use radios were abolished by late 1985 with the amendments to the Telecommunications Act 1960, while radio licences were abolished on 1 January 1991, due to Malaysia's improved economic performance.

46.5% of television owners did not pay for the television licence in 1995.

In 1995, the government had planned to introduce pre-payment of television licence fees for people who have purchased a new television once every ten years, amounting RM 240 for each, replacing the annual payment which caused the government to lose millions of ringgit every year.

The government planned to add a separate licence for cable and satellite television owners and an increase of television licence fee for such users in 1996; it also had planned to increase the television licence fee to RM 36 in 1998.

The television licence fees were abolished in April 1999; however people still paid for the fees. The government decided to refund the fees that amounted to RM 67 million, becoming just RM 21 million in 2000.

Until April 2000, Malaysia had an annual television licence fee of MYR 24 (MYR 2 per month), one of the lowest television licence fees in the world. Now, RTM is funded by the government and advertising.

=== Malta ===
The licence fee in Malta funded Television Malta (TVM), and the radio stations Radio Malta and Radju Parliament run by Public Broadcasting Services. Approximately two-thirds of TVM's funding came from the licence fee, with much of the remainder coming from commercials. Malta's television licence was abolished in 2011 when the free-to-air system was introduced.

=== Netherlands ===
Advertising on public television and radio started in 1967 but was tightly regulated. Initially there was only a small advertising segment before and after news broadcasts. In the late 1980s, commercial breaks of 1 to 3 minutes were allowed between programmes. Advertising on Sundays was not permitted until 1991. Due to excessive collection costs, the fee was abolished around 2000. Income tax was increased and the maximum duration of commercial breaks was extended to 5 and 7 minutes. The Netherlands Public Broadcasting is now funded by government subsidy and advertising. The amount of time used by commercial breaks may not exceed 15 per cent of daily broadcasting time or 10 per cent of total annual broadcasting time.

=== New Zealand ===
Licence fees were first used in New Zealand to fund the radio services of what was to become the New Zealand Broadcasting Corporation. Television was introduced in 1960 and with it the television licence fee, later known as the public broadcasting fee. This was capped at NZ$100 a year in the 1970s, and the country's two television channels, while still publicly owned, became increasingly reliant on advertising. From 1989, it was collected and disbursed by the Broadcasting Commission (NZ On Air) on a contestable basis to support local content production. The public broadcasting fee was abolished in July 1999. NZ On Air was then funded by a direct appropriation from the Ministry for Culture and Heritage.

=== North Macedonia ===
The licence fee in the Republic of North Macedonia was around €26 per year. Until 2005 it was collected monthly as part of the electricity bill. From November 2005, Macedonian Radio-Television (MRT) collected the fee until this responsibility was taken over by the Public Revenue Office. The fee was paid per household, with exemptions for households not covered by a broadcasting signal, and households of people with severe vision or hearing impairment. Hotels and motels were charged one broadcasting fee for every five rooms, legal persons and office space owners paid for one broadcasting fee for each 20 employees or other users of the office space, and owners of catering and other public facilities paid per television set. MRT also received income from advertising and sponsorship.

In January 2017, the licence fee was abolished. MRT, Macedonian Broadcasting and the Agency for Audio and Audiovisual Media Services are now financed directly from the Budget of the Republic of North Macedonia.

=== Norway ===
The licence fee in Norway was abolished in January 2020. Before that, every household with a television needed to pay a fee of c. 3000 kr (c. €305). The fee was charged per household. People in a house who had a separate television and were not in the parental care of the householders needed to pay a separate licence fee. The fee was the primary source of income for Norsk Rikskringkasting (NRK). Since 2020, funding for NRK comes through taxation from each individual liable for income taxes in Norway.

=== Romania ===
Until 2017 a licence fee was collected as part of the electricity bill. It made up part of Televiziunea Română's (TVR) funding, with the rest coming from advertising and government grants. Everyone with a television receiver or a computer needed to pay. In 2016, the Parliament of Romania decided to abolish the fee from 1 January 2017. Since then, TVR's funding mainly comes from government grants and advertising.

=== Singapore ===
Residents of Singapore with televisions in their households, or televisions or radios in their vehicles, were required to acquire the appropriate licences from 1963 to 2010. The licence fee in 1963 was at $24 per year ($2 per month), touted at the time as being "one of the cheapest in this part of the world". The licence fees are channelled to the Singapore Broadcasting Authority where they would be used to fund minority and public service programmes.

As of 1991, the licence fee was at $100 per year.

The licence fees were abolished from 1 January 2011. Then Finance Minister Tharman Shanmugaratnam reported that he was abolishing the fees as they were "losing their relevance".

=== Slovakia ===
The TV licence fee in Slovakia was €4.64 per month (€55.68 per year). In addition to the licence fee, RTVS also received state subsidies and money from advertising. The licence fee was abolished from 1 July 2023.

=== Soviet Union ===
Until 1961, all radio and television receivers in the Soviet Union were required to be registered in local telecommunication offices and a subscription fee was to be paid monthly. Compulsory registration and subscription fees were abolished on 18 August 1961, with prices of radio and television receivers raised to compensate for the lost fees.

=== Sweden ===
On 1 January 2019, the television licence (Swedish: TV-avgift, literally TV fee) in Sweden was scrapped and replaced by a "general public service fee" (Swedish: allmän public service-avgift), which is a flat income-based public broadcasting tax of 1 per cent, capped at 1,300 Swedish kronor (approximately US$145 or €126) per person per year. The fee is administered by the Swedish Tax Agency (Swedish: Skatteverket), on behalf of the country's three public broadcasters Sveriges Television (SVT), Sveriges Radio (SR) and Sveriges Utbildningsradio (UR). The fee pays for 5 television channels, 45 radio channels, and online television and radio.

Previously the television licence was a household-based flat fee. Originally it was referred as the "television licence" (Swedish: TV-licens), but in the 2000s was renamed "television fee". It was last charged in 2018 at kr 2,400 per annum. It was payable in monthly, bimonthly, quarterly or annual instalments, to the agency Radiotjänst i Kiruna, which was jointly owned by SVT, SR and UR. The fee was collected by every household or company containing a television set, and possession of such a device had to be reported to Radiotjänst by law. One fee was collected per household regardless of the number of television sets in the home or at other locations owned by the household, such as summer houses. Although the fee also paid for radio broadcasting, there was no specific fee for radios since the radio licence was abolished in 1978. Television licence evasion was suspected to be around 11 to 15 per cent.

=== Taiwan ===
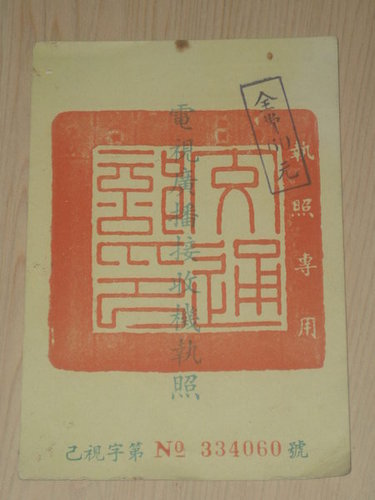
A Taiwanese TV licence

Between 1959 and the 1970s, all radio and TV receivers in Taiwan were required to have a licence with an annual fee of NT$60. This was to prevent influence from mainland China's (the People's Republic of China) channels.

=== Thailand ===
The Radio Broadcasting and Television Act, B.E. 2498 (1955) set a lifetime licence fee of 200 baht (equivalent to 2,334 baht in 2020) for ownership of radio and television sets or parts. It was abolished in 1959 as television and radio quickly became a vital source of information.

== Countries that have never had a television or broadcasting licence ==
=== Andorra ===
Ràdio i Televisió d'Andorra, the public broadcaster, is funded by advertising and government grants with no fee for viewers.

=== Brazil ===
The federal company Empresa Brasil de Comunicação, which manages TV Brasil and public radio stations (Rádio MEC and Rádio Nacional), is financed from the Federal Budget, besides profit from licensing and production of programs, institutional advertisement, and service rendering to public and private institutions.

The Padre Anchieta Foundation, which manages TV Cultura and the Cultura FM and Cultura Brasil radio stations in São Paulo, receives funds from the state government, advertisements and fundraising from the private sector. In December 1997, the "Education and Culture Tax", a state tax in São Paulo, was instituted to fund the state's public broadcasters, TV Cultura and Rádio Cultura. The tax was charged monthly through electricity bills according to consumers' energy consumption. However, the collection of the fee was declared unconstitutional by the Court of Justice of the State of São Paulo.

=== Chile ===
The state-owned Chilean television broadcaster, Televisión Nacional de Chile (TVN), founded in 1969, is financed by advertising, which can air between programs. Its autonomous financing allows the corporation to have economic independence from the State of Chile, being able to fully retain and take advantage of its annual profits only if the director in charge can esteem that way, as if it were a private company; however, TVN by a 1992 law cannot receive state financing under any circumstance. Its educational subchannel, NTV, is instead state-financed through a unique provision of funds courtesy of the Finance Ministry of Chile, and therefore cannot air advertisements, as well as have any commercial links.

=== China ===
The current state broadcaster, China Central Television (CCTV), established in 1958, is funded almost entirely through the sale of commercial advertising time, although this is supplemented by government funding and a tax of ¥2 per month from all cable television subscribers in the country.

=== Estonia ===
In Estonia there are three public TV channels: Eesti Televisioon ETV, ETV2, and ETV+ (ETV+ was launched on 27 September 2015 and mostly targets people who speak Russian). The funding comes from government grant-in-aid. ETV is currently one of only a few public television broadcasters in the European Union which has neither advertising nor a licence fee and is solely funded by national government grants. Commercials in public broadcasting television were stopped in 2002 over concerns that its low prices were damaging the ability of commercial broadcasters to operate. The introduction of a licence fee system was considered but ultimately rejected in the face of public opposition.

=== Iran ===
Iran has never levied television licence fees. After the 1979 Islamic Revolution, National Iranian Radio and Television was renamed Islamic Republic of Iran Broadcasting, and became the state broadcaster. In Iran, private broadcasting is illegal.

=== Latvia ===
Public Broadcasting of Latvia is a consortium of the public radio broadcaster Latvijas Radio and the public TV broadcaster Latvijas Televīzija, which operates the LTV1 and LTV7 channels. After years of debate, the public broadcasters ceased airing commercial advertising from January 1, 2021, and became fully government-funded by the national budget. The introduction of a television licence has been previously debated, but this was opposed by the government.

=== Luxembourg ===
Luxembourg has never had a television licence requirement, which made it a prime way for various multi-national stations to host their operations and transmitters in the country, which was the fate of Radio Télévision Luxembourg. Until 1993, it had no national public broadcaster, and it still has no public television broadcaster.

Radio 100,7 is a radio station funded by the country's Ministry of Culture and by sponsorship arrangements. Television in Luxembourg is provided by the commercial network RTL Télé Lëtzebuerg and channels serving nearby countries.

=== Monaco ===
Monaco has never had any listener or viewer broadcasting licence fee. Since the establishment of Radio Monte-Carlo in 1943 and Télévision Monte-Carlo in 1954, both have been funded on a commercial basis with no charge for the audience.

=== Nigeria ===
Television licences are not used in Nigeria, except in the sense of broadcasting licences granted to private networks. The federal government's television station, NTA (Nigerian Television Authority), has two broadcast networks: NTA 1 is partly funded by central government and partly by advertising revenue, and NTA 2 is wholly funded by advertisements. Almost all thirty-six states have their own television stations, funded wholly or substantially by their respective governments.

=== Philippines ===
Television licensing has never been enacted in the Philippines. The state-owned television (PTV and IBC) and radio (PBS) stations have been funded directly by the government's annual budget and by advertising.

=== Post-Soviet states ===
See #Soviet Union.

=== Spain ===
Spanish national public broadcasters had been funded by government grants and advertising income since Radio Nacional de España (RNE) radio service was launched in 1937 and Televisión Española (TVE) television service was launched in 1956. Although RNE removed advertising in 1986, TVE continued broadcasting commercials until 2009. Since 2010, Radiotelevisión Española (RTVE) –the corporation that absorbed the management of RNE and TVE in 2007– is funded by government grants and taxes paid by private nationwide television broadcasters and telecommunications companies.

=== United States ===
In the United States, privately owned commercial radio and television stations funded by advertising proved to be commercially viable. Some governments owned non-commercial radio stations (such as WNYC, owned by New York City from 1922 to 1997) or educational television stations, but most broadcasters were private companies or were owned by charitable organizations supported by donations.

The Corporation for Public Broadcasting (CPB) was created by the Public Broadcasting Act of 1967, and this led to the creation of the Public Broadcasting Service (PBS) and National Public Radio (NPR). These are loose networks of non-commercial educational (NCE) stations owned by state and local governments, educational institutions, and non-profit organizations. They are more similar to U.S. commercial networks than European public broadcasters.

Annual funding for public television in the United States was US$445.5 million in 2014 (including interest revenue). The CPB, and virtually all government-owned stations, are funded through general taxes, donations from individuals (usually in the form of "memberships"), and charitable organizations. Individual programs on public broadcasters may be supported by underwriting spots paid for by sponsors. Between 53 and 60 percent of public television's revenues come from private membership donations and grants, so most stations solicit individual donations by fundraising, pledge drives or telethons which can disrupt regularly scheduled programming. Normal programming can be replaced with specials aimed at a wider audience to solicit new members and donations.

In some rural areas of the United States, broadcast translator districts exist, which are funded by an ad valorem property tax on all property within the district, or by a parcel tax on each dwelling unit within the district. Failure to pay the TV translator tax has the same repercussions as failing to pay any other property tax, including a lien placed on the property and eventual seizure. In addition, fines can be levied on viewers who watch TV from the translator signals without paying the fee. As the Federal Communications Commission has exclusive jurisdiction over broadcast stations, whether a local authority can legally impose a fee merely to watch an over-the-air broadcast station is questionable. In some areas the tax is charged regardless of whether the resident watches TV from the translator. In other areas the property owner may certify that they do not use the translator district's services and get a waiver.

Cable television franchise fee agreements are added to cable TV bills to fund public, educational, and government access (PEG) television for the municipality that granted the franchise agreement. State governments may also add taxes. These taxes generate controversy since they sometimes go into the general taxation fund, or there is "double taxation" where public-access television is paid for by taxes but the cable television operator has to pay for equipment or facilities, or has to pay for local municipality projects that are not related to television.

=== Uruguay ===
Uruguay does not have a fee or TV licence. The two public broadcasters in the country, Canal 5 and RNU, are funded by government grants.

=== Vietnam ===
Vietnam has never had a television licence fee. Advertising was introduced in the early 1990s as a way to generate revenue for television stations. The current state broadcaster, Vietnam Television, receives the majority of its funds through advertising and some from government subsidies. Local television stations in Vietnam are operated in a similar way.

== Detection of television licence evasion ==
In many jurisdictions, television licences are enforced. Detection of illegal television sets can be as simple as observing the lights and sounds of a television used in a property without a licence.

Television detector vans have been employed by TV Licensing in the United Kingdom, with various detection techniques reported. An effort to compel the BBC to release key information about the television detection equipment under the Freedom of Information Act 2000 was rejected by the Information Commissioner's Office (ICO). The BBC stated, "Detection equipment is complex to deploy as its use is strictly governed by the Regulation of Investigatory Powers Act 2000 (RIPA) and the Regulation of Investigatory Powers (British Broadcasting Corporation) Order 2001. RIPA and the Order outline how relevant investigatory powers are to be used by the BBC and ensure compliance with human rights."

The BBC has also resisted further Freedom of Information Act requests seeking data on estimated evasion rates for each nation of the UK, citing the same exemptions.

== Opinions of television licensing systems ==
Advocates argue that a main advantage of television fully funded by a licence fee is that programming can be enjoyed without interruptions for advertisements. Europeans tend to watch television for one hour less per day than North Americans, but because of differences in advertising may be enjoying the same amount of television content in that shorter time. Television funded by advertising is not truly free of cost to consumers as the cost of advertising is passed on in the price of products.

Critics of receiver licensing point out that a licence is a regressive form of taxation. In contrast, costs from advertising are paid proportion to the consumption of advertised goods. The experience with broadcast deregulation in Europe suggests that demand for commercial-free content is not as high as once thought.

The Department concluded that the licence fee was "the least worse [sic] option", and in 2005 the British government described the system as "the best (and most widely supported) funding model, even though it is not perfect".

In 2018, Swiss voters rejected a referendum to scrap TV licensing by 71.6 per cent to 28.4 per cent. In Bulgaria, a fee is specified in the broadcasting law but has never been implemented. Lithuania and Latvia have debated a licence fee but not legislated for one, partly due to government reluctance to relinquish direct control of Latvijas Televīzija.

The Czech Republic increased the proportion of funding that the public broadcaster gets from licence fees, justifying the move with the argument that the existing public service broadcasters cannot compete with commercial broadcasters for advertising revenues.

== Internet-based broadcast access ==
The Internet allows television and radio programmes to be easily accessed outside their country of origin. Where national broadcasters have streaming services, there would be no technological difficulties in accessing these programmes internationally. However, countries with TV licensing systems often do not have a way for potential international viewers to pay for a licence. Instead, they work to prevent international access because licensing rules have not adapted to the possible global audience.
