= Maria Borelius =

Swedish politician

Minister for Foreign Trade
- In office 6 October 2006 – 14 October 2006
- Prime Minister: Fredrik Reinfeldt
- Preceded by: Thomas Östros
- Succeeded by: Sten Tolgfors

Personal details
- Born: 6 July 1960 (age 66) Täby, Sweden
- Party: Moderate Party
- Education: Lund University; New York University
- Occupation: Journalist, entrepreneur

Maria Sigrid Astrid Borelius (born 6 July 1960) is a Swedish former Minister for Foreign Trade, Science journalist and entrepreneur, working as advisor to global companies, academies and institutions. Maria is a member of the advisory council of Open Europe, a European think tank with offices in London, Brussels and Berlin promoting ideas for economic and political reform of the European Union. Maria is also a Partner with Living Waters, a London-based consultancy focusing on CSR, public affairs and developing fundraising strategies. She is an advisor to the Karolinska Institute, which awards the Nobel prize in medicine, and to Lund University and works as a columnist with the Swedish business daily, Dagens Industri, mainly covering areas of Entrepreneurship, Science, research, globalization and politics.

== Education and career ==
Between 2007 and 2012 Maria Borelius was the Vice Chairman and CEO of Hand in hand International, a UK based charity, working with partnering organisations in the developing world to promote enterprise and job-creation among marginalized women in the bottom billion. During these years the organisations in India, South-Africa, Afghanistan and India grew from 150,000 women in programs, to over 1 million women, with an international fundraising organization being created with UN partnership, and donors among businesses, private individuals and bilateral institutions.

Maria Borelius has been active on several boards of listed companies on the Swedish stock exchange, with a focus on technology companies such as Active Biotech, Sweco and Telelogic, and within academia, such as the Swedish National Science board.

In 2006 stood for Election for the Swedish Moderate Party, on an agenda of promoting entrepreneurship and strengthening schools and universities. Maria Borelius was elected a Member of Parliament from the Stockholm County, and became Minister for Foreign Trade in the centre-right government that was formed after the election. Just eight days after her appointment Borelius resigned from the office. Within a few weeks another minister also resigned. Borelius later admitted that she during the 1990s, when her four children were small, had used child-care without reporting to the tax authorities and paying the full 32% social fees, and in the media frenzy that followed, resigned. The Swedish Government has since then changed the system by which private child care is partly paid through the so-called “RUT” reforms.

Together with TV entrepreneur Annie Wegelius, she started the digital TV channel and learning portal K-World.

Before this Maria Borelius was active as science journalist, and editor for the evening news “Rapport” on Swedish national public TV, and the face of the science program NOVA for many years. She produced numerous TV-programs on popular science, such as “To give birth” which got record audiences. She has written several books on popular medicine, such as “Sedan du fött”, translated into German, Norwegian and Danish, and “Motboken” with Marie Bloom. In 2013 Maria joined the advisory council of Open Europe.

Maria Borelius has lived in Great Britain since 2000, is married to Greger Larson, and has four children born 1990, 1992, 1993 and 1995.

== Education ==
- New York University 1986 (Master of Science Reporting)
- Lund University 1984 (Fil.kand in Biology, mathematics and physics)

== Awards ==
- 2001 The honorary “Hierta” scholarship from the Swedish Journalist Association.
- 1994 Great Journalist prize from the Swedish Cancerfund.
- 1984 Scholarship Swedish Science Association.

Preceded by Thomas Östros	Minister for Foreign Trade; 2006	Succeeded by Sten Tolgfors
