= Ministry for Rural Affairs (Sweden) =

Swedish government ministry

- Landsbygdsdepartementet

Agriculture ministry overview
- Formed: 31 March 1900
- Dissolved: 31 December 2014
- Superseding Agriculture ministry: Ministry of Enterprise and Innovation
- Headquarters: Stockholm, Sweden
- Annual budget: SEK 12,212,700 (1911)
- Minister responsible: Minister for Rural Affairs (2011–2014) Minister of Agriculture (1900–2010)
- Parent agency: Government Offices (Note: Before 1 January 1975, the Government Offices was called the Royal Chancery.)

The Ministry for Rural Affairs (Swedish: Landsbygdsdepartementet), known between 1900 and 2010 as the Ministry of Agriculture (Note: The ministry has been translated as the Ministry of Agriculture, Food and Fisheries and earlier as the Ministry of Agriculture.) (Swedish: Jordbruksdepartementet, Jo), was a ministry within the government of Sweden. The ministry was responsible for matters relating to rural areas, food and land- and water-based industries, regional development, transport and infrastructure, housing, and community planning. The ministry was headed by the minister for rural affairs (2011–2014) and the minister of agriculture (1900–2010). The ministry was disbanded on 31 December 2014, and from 1 January 2015, the matters was handled by the Ministry of Enterprise and Innovation.

== History ==
The Ministry of Agriculture was formed in 1900 as the first new ministry after the departemental reform of 1840. The ministry was established according to the 1900 Riksdag decision and royal decree on 31 March of the same year. The department was created by merging mainly the agricultural affairs of the Ministry for Civil Service Affairs at the time with the Ministry of Finance's affairs concerning the royal demesne and forests. According to the royal decree of 31 March 1900, with amendments on 30 January 1903, and 30 September 1904, this department was responsible for matters related to agriculture, farming, handicrafts, forestry, along with the associated educational institutions, as well as hunting and fishing. It included the crown's immovable property, which was not held with a stipulated right of residence or allocated for a specific state purpose, and therefore either leased for immediate use or placed under the care of a special government authority. It also covered state and other public forests, as well as excess crown lands. The department oversaw veterinary services and animal diseases, state stud farming, and the improvement of horse breeding. It managed land surveying, land partitioning, consolidation, and land division. Additionally, it was responsible for the Geographical Survey Office of Sweden (Rikets allmänna kartverk) and the Geological Survey of Sweden, the system of public conveyance, inns, and road maintenance, ferry and bridge obligations, public log driving, support, loan grants, and allocations from the relief fund, cultivation loan fund, and frost reduction fund. It also handled temporary matters related to public poorhouses.

In the 1950s, the Ministry of Agriculture handled matters related to agriculture and farming, including associated research, experiments, and educational systems. It also managed fisheries, stud farming, horse breeding, the civilian veterinary service, homeownership programs, agricultural credit operations, and cooperative movements. The ministry oversaw state-owned immovable properties, forests, and forestry, as well as hunting and game conservation, natural landmarks, land surveying, and the Geographical Survey Office. It was responsible for the application of water laws and regulations on property rights and restrictions on land acquisition, along with matters related to the Sámi people. The Ministry of Agriculture also addressed issues related to legislation on forests and forest management, timber measurement, common land rights, as well as hunting and fishing.

The ministry's head officially held the title "Minister for Agriculture and Chief of the Royal Ministry of Agriculture," but in everyday language, they were commonly referred to as the minister of agriculture. For the preparation of matters and the processing of decisions, the ministry head had at their disposal a department of the Royal Chancery (Kunglig Majestäts kansli), which, in 1910, consisted of one director general for administrative affairs (expeditionschef), two deputy directors (kansliråd) and directors (byråchef), three administrative officers (kanslisekreterare), one registrar, and a number of assistants (acting officials). In the 1950s, the ministry was divided into two main departments: one under the state secretary and the other under the director general for administrative affairs. Under the former, there was the legal department, while under the latter, there were three offices with deputy directors as chiefs: one for agriculture and related matters, one for state domains and forestry, and one for agricultural rationalization, acquisition of agricultural property, land surveying, and more.

The Ministry of Agriculture changed its name to the Ministry for Rural Affairs on 1 January 2011. The ministry was disbanded on 31 December 2014, and from 1 January 2015, the matters was handled by the Ministry of Enterprise and Innovation. On 1 January 2023, the Ministry of Rural Affairs and Infrastructure was established which handles some of the ministry's old tasks.

== Location ==
From at least 1967 to 1971, the ministry was located at Riddarhustorget 7-9. In 1972 it moved to Departementets hus at Jakobsgatan 26 where it remained until 1976. Between 1977 and 1982, a new building for the Government Offices was constructed at Drottninggatan 21. The ministry moved there in 1983 and remained at this address until 1998. Between 1999 and 2000, the ministry was located at Vasagatan 8-10. From 2001 until at least 2010, the ministry was located at Fredsgatan 8.

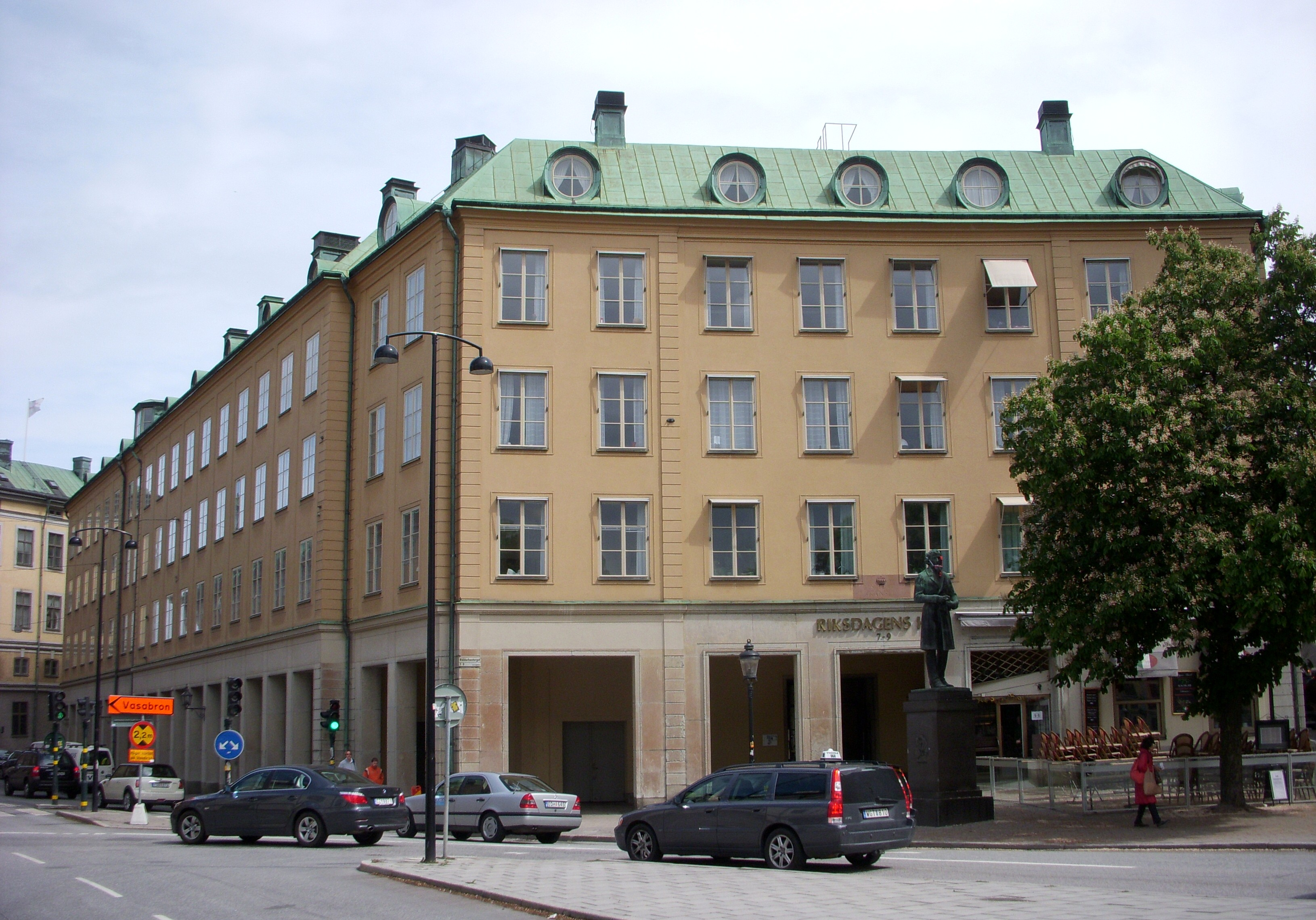
Riddarhustorget 7-9

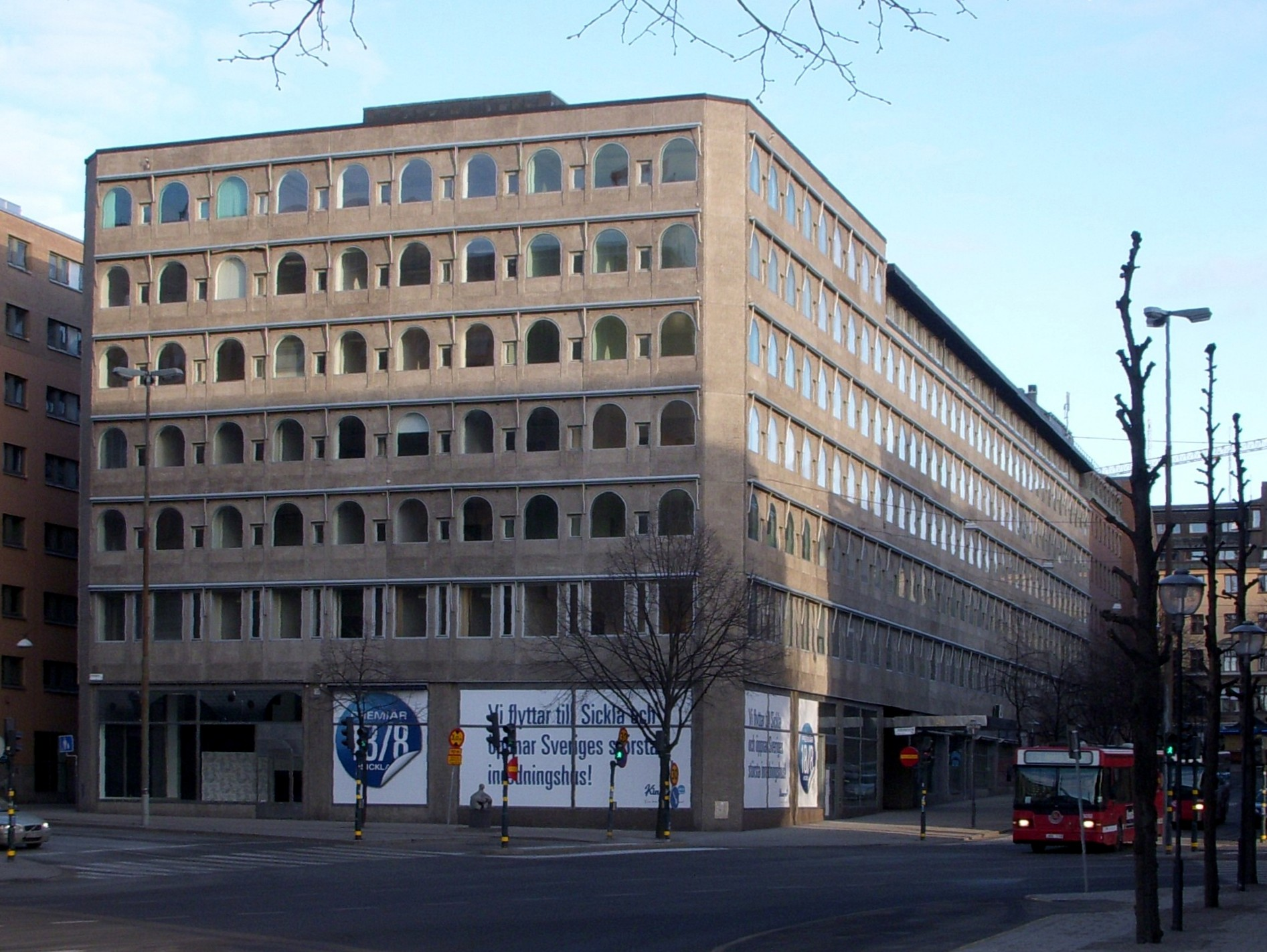
Jakobsgatan 26

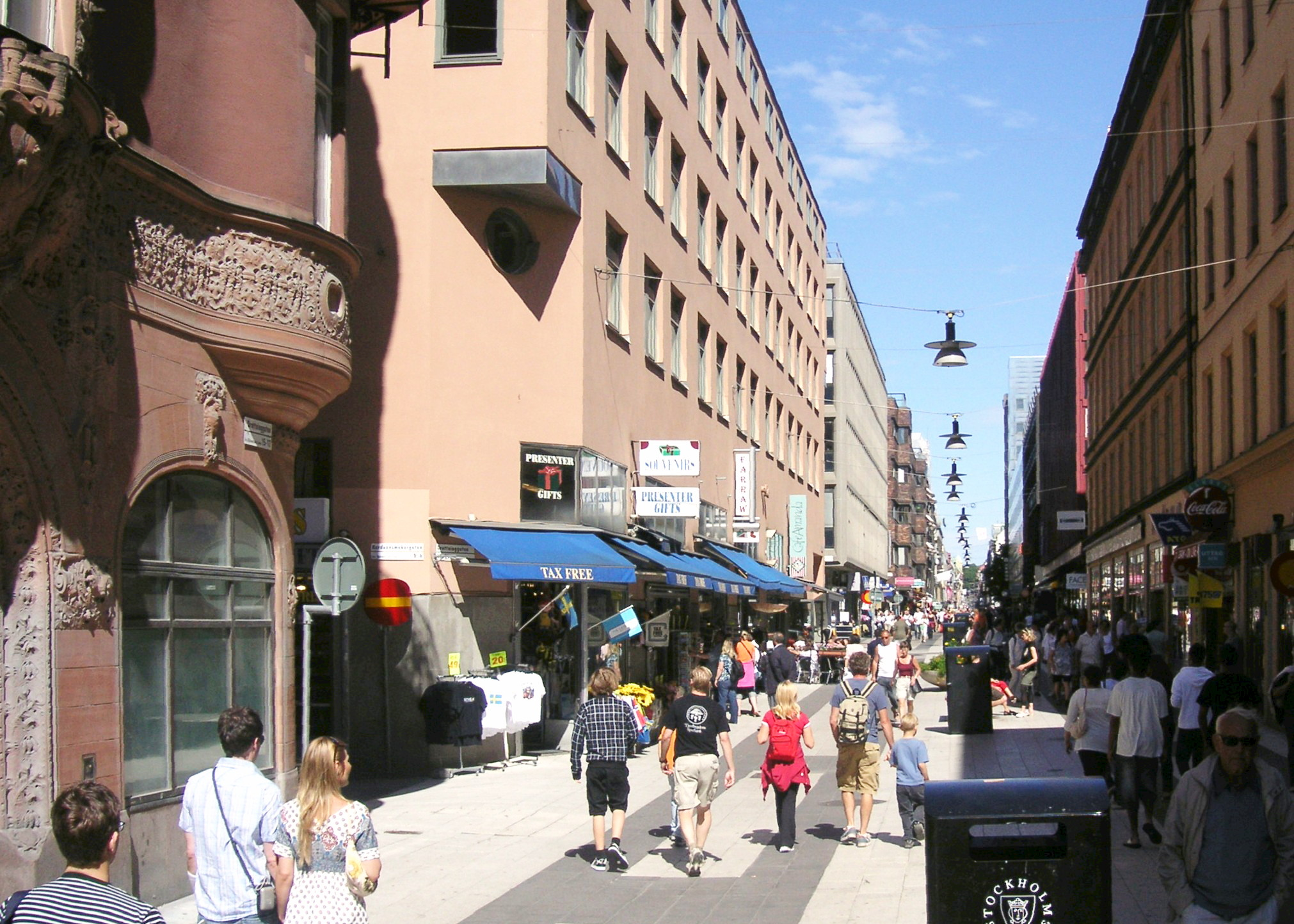
Drottninggatan 21

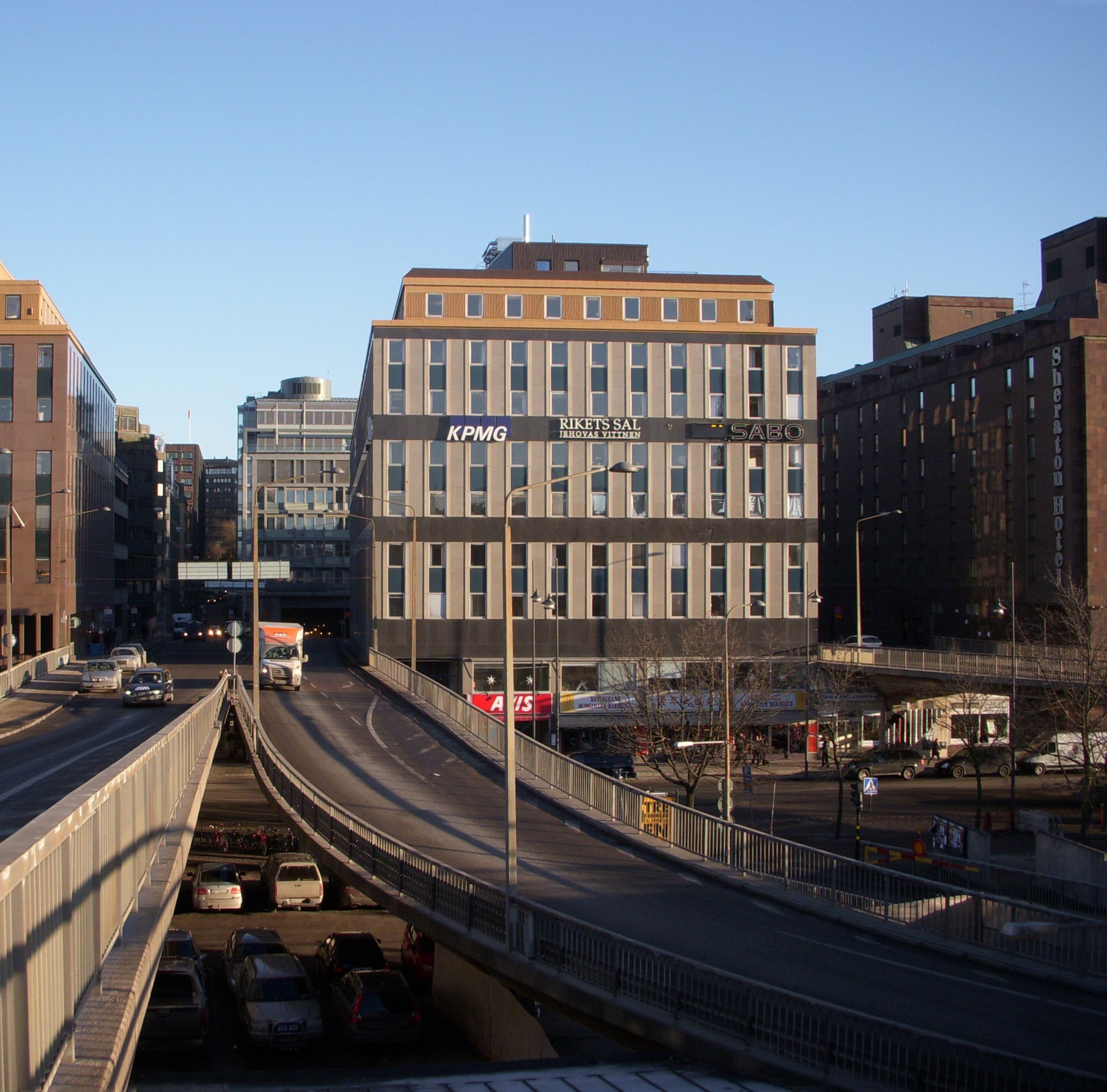
Vasagatan 8-10

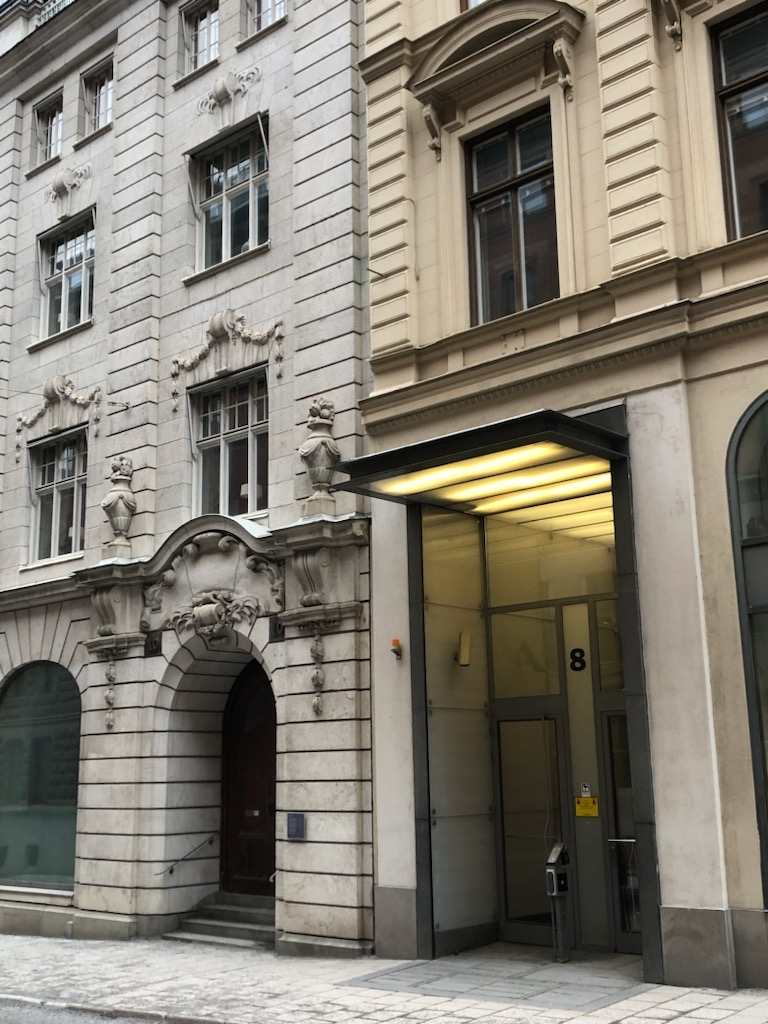
Fredsgatan 8

== Central boards and agencies ==
=== 1910s ===
In 1910, among other things, the following central boards and agencies (centrala ämbetsverk) belonged to the ministry: Royal Swedish General Land Survey Office (Rikets generallandtmäterikontor), National Swedish Land Survey Board with the land surveying service (lantmäteristaten); National Swedish Board of Horse-Breeding (Stuteriöverstyrelsen) with the Stud Commission (stuterikommissionen) and the stud service (stuteristaten); Geological Survey of Sweden; National [Swedish] Board of Crown Forests and Lands (Domänstyrelsen) with the forestry service, forestry schools and the Superintendents of Crown Lands and Forests (domänintendenter): National [Swedish] Board of Agriculture (Lantbruksstyrelsen) with national agricultural engineers (statens lantbruksingenjörer), instructors, the Fisheries Administration (fiskeriadministrationen), and the Central Institution for the experimental system in the field of agriculture (Centralanstalten för försöksväsendet på jordbruksområdet) as well as the agricultural teaching institutions; Hydrographic Bureau (Hydrografiska byrån); veterinary schools; Commission for the Geographical Survey (Kommissionen för de allmänna kartarbetena); Geographical Survey Office of Sweden (Rikets allmänna kartverk); agricultural societies (hushållningssällskapen); the chemical stations and the seed testing stations (frökontrollanstalterna); county veterinarians; Royal Swedish Academy of Agriculture.

=== 1920s ===
In 1920, among other things, the following central boards and agencies (centrala ämbetsverk) belonged to the ministry: National Swedish Land Survey Board, National Swedish Board of Horse-Breeding, Geological Survey of Sweden, National [Swedish] Board of Crown Forests and Lands, National [Swedish] Board of Agriculture, Commission for the Geographical Survey, Swedish Meteorological and Hydrological Institute.

=== 1930s ===
In 1930, among other things, the following central boards and agencies (centrala ämbetsverk) belonged to the ministry: National Swedish Land Survey Board, National Swedish Board of Horse-Breeding, Geological Survey of Sweden, National [Swedish] Board of Crown Forests and Lands, National [Swedish] Board of Agriculture, Commission for the Geographical Survey, Swedish Meteorological and Hydrological Institute, National Swedish Warehouse and Cold Storage Board (Statens lagerhus- och fryshusstyrelse, and the National [Swedish] Rural Resettlement and Home Ownership Board (Statens egnahemsstyrelse).

=== 1940s ===
In 1940, among other things, the following central boards and agencies (centrala ämbetsverk) belonged to the ministry: National Swedish Land Survey Board, Geographical Survey Office of Sweden, Geological Survey of Sweden, National [Swedish] Board of Crown Forests and Lands, Swedish Meteorological and Hydrological Institute, Cartographic Commission (Kartverkskommissionen), National [Swedish] Board of Agriculture, National Swedish Warehouse and Cold Storage Board, and the Rural Resettlement and Home Ownership Board (Egnahemsstyrelsen).

=== 1950s ===
In 1950, among other things, the following central boards and agencies (centrala ämbetsverk) belonged to the ministry: National Swedish Land Survey Board, Geographical Survey Office of Sweden, National [Swedish] Board of Crown Forests and Lands, Cartographic Commission, National [Swedish] Board of Agriculture, National [Swedish] Board of Forestry (Skogsstyrelsen), National [Swedish] Veterinary Board (Veterinärstyrelsen), and the National [Swedish] Board of Fisheries with the national's fisheries trials.

=== 1960s ===
In 1960, among other things, the following central boards and agencies (centrala ämbetsverk) belonged to the ministry: National Swedish Land Survey Board, Geographical Survey Office of Sweden, National [Swedish] Board of Crown Forests and Lands, Cartographic Commission, National [Swedish] Board of Agriculture, National [Swedish] Board of Forestry, National [Swedish] Veterinary Board, National [Swedish] Board of Fisheries and the Water Protection Service (Fiskeristyrelsen med statens vatteninspektion), National [Swedish] Agricultural Marketing Board (Statens jordbruksnämnd), and the Swedish National FAO [Food and Agriculture Organization] Committee (Svenska FAO-kommittén).

=== 1970s ===
In 1970, among other things, the following central boards and agencies (centrala ämbetsverk) belonged to the ministry: National [Swedish] Board of Agriculture, National [Swedish] Board of Forestry, National [Swedish] Veterinary Board, National [Swedish] Board of Fisheries (Fiskeristyrelsen), National [Swedish] Agricultural Marketing Board, National Swedish Environment Protection Board, Swedish National FAO [Food and Agriculture Organization] Committee, Environmental Advisory Council (Miljövårdsberedningen), and the National [Swedish] Franchise Board for Environment Protection (Koncessionsnämnden för miljöskydd).

=== 1980s ===
In 1980, among other things, the following central boards and agencies (centrala ämbetsverk) belonged to the ministry: National [Swedish] Board of Agriculture, Reindeer Board (Rennämnden), Swedish Veterinary Services Responsibility Council (Veterinärväsendets ansvarsnämnd), Agriculture Council (Lantbruksråd), National [Swedish] Board of Forestry, National Swedish Food Administration, National [Swedish] Board of Fisheries, National [Swedish] Agricultural Marketing Board, National Swedish Environment Protection Board, Swedish Products Control Board (Produktkontrollnämnden), Swedish National FAO [Food and Agriculture Organization] Committee, Environmental Advisory Council, Swedish Mountain Safety Council (Fjällsäkerhetsrådet), National [Swedish] Franchise Board for Environment Protection, National [Swedish] Institute of Radiation Protection (Statens strålskyddsinstitut), Joint Council of Farm Economics (Lantbruksekonomiska samarbetsnämnden), Finsk-svenska gränsälvskommissionen, Swedish Council of Environmental Information (Miljödatanämnden) and Livsmedelsberedningen.

=== 1990s ===
In 1990, among other things, the following central boards and agencies (centrala ämbetsverk) belonged to the ministry: Committee for Food and Nutrition Issues (Beredningen för livsmedels- och näringsfrågor), Swedish National Board for Laboratory Animals (Centrala försöksdjursnämnden), Permanent committee according to the Swedish-Norwegian reindeer herding convention (Fasta utskottet enligt svensk-norska renbeteskonventionen), Fishery Boards (Fiskenämnderna), National [Swedish] Board of Fisheries, Swedish Institute for Forest Improvement (Institutet för skogsförbättring), National Institute of Agricultural Engineering (Jordbrukstekniska institutet), Joint Council of Farm Economics, Agriculture Boards (Lantbruksnämnderna), Agriculture Council, National [Swedish] Board of Agriculture, Swedish Council for Forestry and Agricultural Research (Skogs- och jordbrukets forskningsråd), Royal Swedish Academy of Agriculture and Forestry, National [Swedish] Board of Forestry, Local Forest Conservation Boards (Skogsvårdsstyrelserna), National [Swedish] Agricultural Marketing Board, National [Swedish] Laboratory for Agricultural Chemistry (Statens lantbrukskemiska laboratorium), National Swedish Food Administration, National [Swedish] Testing Institute for Agricultural Machinery (Statens maskinprovningar), Swedish Seed Testing and Certification Institute, National [Swedish] Veterinary Institute (Statens veterinärmedicinska anstalt), National [Swedish] Plant Variety Board (Statens växtsortnämnd), Sami Foundation Board (Styrelsen för samefonden), Swedish National FAO [Food and Agriculture Organization] Committee, Swedish Testing Station for Dairy Products and Eggs (Svenska kontrollanstalten för mejeriprodukter och ägg), Svensk matpotatiskontroll, Swedish University of Agricultural Sciences, Swedish Veterinary Authority (Veterinärstaten) and the Swedish Veterinary Services Responsibility Council.

=== 2000s ===
In 2000, among other things, the following central boards and agencies (centrala ämbetsverk) belonged to the ministry: Swedish National Board for Laboratory Animals, Permanent committee according to the Swedish-Norwegian reindeer herding convention, National Swedish Board of Fisheries (Fiskeriverket), National Institute of Agricultural Engineering, Royal Swedish Academy of Agriculture and Forestry, Agriculture Council, Swedish Institute for Food and Agricultural Economics (Livsmedelsekonomiska institutet), Sámi Parliament of Sweden, Swedish Council for Forestry and Agricultural Research, Swedish Board of Agriculture, National Swedish Food Administration, Swedish Seed Testing and Certification Institute, National [Swedish] Veterinary Institute, National [Swedish] Plant Variety Board, Sami Foundation Board, Swedish National FAO [Food and Agriculture Organization] Committee, Swedish University of Agricultural Sciences, Veterinary Disciplinary Board, and some local veterinary services.

=== 2010s ===
In 2010, among other things, the following central boards and agencies (centrala ämbetsverk) belonged to the ministry: Ansvarsnämnden för djurens hälso- och sjukvård, National Swedish Board of Fisheries, Royal Swedish Academy of Agriculture and Forestry, Agriculture Council and agriculture attachées, Swedish National Food Agency, Sámi Parliament of Sweden, National [Swedish] Board of Forestry, Swedish Board of Agriculture, National [Swedish] Veterinary Institute, Sami Foundation Board, Swedish National FAO [Food and Agriculture Organization] Committee, Swedish University of Agricultural Sciences, and some local veterinary services.
