= Government agencies in Sweden =

The government agencies in Sweden are state authorities that act independently to carry out the policies of the Government of Sweden. The ministries are relatively small and merely policy-making organizations, allowed to monitor the agencies and preparing decision and policy papers for the government as a collective body to decide upon.

A Cabinet Minister is explicitly prohibited from interfering with the day-to-day operation in an agency or the outcome in individual cases. The cardinal rule is that Ministers are not allowed to issue orders to agencies in their portfolio personally (with only a few exceptions) as the government agencies are subject to decisions made by the government, although the government cannot even directly overrule an agency in the handling of an individual case.

Other than the executive branch, the Riksdag also has a number of independent agencies.

== Riksdag ==
- Riksbank, Sweden's central bank.
- National Audit Office (Riksrevisionen) — the supreme audit institution of Sweden.
- The Parliamentary Ombudsman (Justitieombudsmannen).

== Ministry of Justice ==
- Chancellor of Justice (Justitiekanslern)
- Commission on Security and Integrity Protection (Säkerhets- och integritetsskyddsnämnden)
- Crime Victim Authority (Brottsoffermyndigheten)
- Authority for Privacy Protection (Integritetsskyddsmyndigheten)
- Economic Crime Authority (Ekobrottsmyndigheten)
- Migration Agency (Migrationsverket)
- Board of Forensic Medicine (Rättsmedicinalverket)
- Council for Crime Prevention (Brottsförebyggande rådet)
- Courts Administration (Domstolsverket)
- Police Authority (Polismyndigheten)
- Security Service (Säkerhetspolisen)
- Prison and Probation Service (Kriminalvården)
- Prosecution Authority (Åklagarmyndigheten)
- Inspectorate of Auditors (Revisorsinspektionen)
- Gene Technology Advisory Board (Gentekniknämnden)
- Legal Aid Authority (Rättshjälpsmyndigheten)
- Judges Proposals Board (Domarnämnden)
- Council on Legislation (Lagrådet)

== Ministry for Foreign Affairs ==
- Legations and embassies in foreign countries
- Export Credits Guarantee Board (Exportkreditnämnden)
- Folke Bernadotte Academy (Folke Bernadotteakademin
- Inspectorate of Strategic Products (Inspektionen för strategiska produkter)
- Board of Trade (Kommerskollegium)
- Nordic Africa Institute (Nordiska Afrikainstitutet)
- SWEDAC (Styrelsen för ackreditering och teknisk kontroll)
- Sida (Styrelsen för internationellt utvecklingssamarbete)
- Swedish Institute (Svenska institutet)
- Swedish Institute Alexandria (Svenska institutet i Alexandria)
- Business Sweden (Sveriges export- och investeringsråd).

== Ministry of Defence ==
- Armed Forces (Försvarsmakten)
- Defence Materiel Administration (Försvarets materielverk)
- Defence Conscription and Assessment Agency (Totalförsvarets plikt- och prövningsverk)
- National Defence Radio Establishment (Försvarets radioanstalt)
- Defence Research Agency (Totalförsvarets forskningsinstitut)
- Foreign Intelligence Inspectorate (Statens inspektion för försvarsunderrättelseverksamheten)
- Foreign Intelligence Court (Försvarsunderrättelsedomstolen)
- Agency for Defence Analysis (Myndigheten för totalförsvarsanalys)
- Coast Guard (Kustbevakningen)
- Psychological Defence Agency (Myndigheten för psykologiskt försvar)
- Civil Defence and Resilience Agency (Myndigheten för civil försvar)
- Accident Investigation Authority (Statens haverikommission)

== Ministry of Employment ==
- Gender Equality Agency (Jämställdhetsmyndigheten)
- Delegation against segregation (Delegationen mot segregation)
- Agency for Work Environment Expertise(Myndigheten för arbetsmiljökunskap)
- Public Employment Service (Arbetsförmedlingen)
- Work Environment Authority (Arbetsmiljöverket)
- Labour Court (Arbetsdomstolen)
- Unemployment Insurance Board (Inspektionen för arbetslöshetsförsäkringen)
- Council for Employee Representation on Boards of Directors (Nämnden för styrelserepresentationsfrågor)
- Council for the European Social Fund in Sweden (Swedish ESF Council)
- Institute for Evaluation of Labour Market and Education Policy (Institutet för arbetsmarknads- och utbildningspolitisk utvärdering)
- Advisory Board on Patent Rights and Compensation Settlements for Inventions at Work (Statens nämnd för arbetstagares uppfinningar)
- National Mediation Office (Medlingsinstitutet)
- ILO committee (Svenska ILO-kommittén)
- Board against Discrimination (Nämnden mot diskriminering)
- Ombudsman for Children (Barnombudsmannen)
- Equality Ombudsman (Diskrimineringsombudsmannen)

== Ministry of Enterprise and Innovation ==
- Competition Authority (Konkurrensverket)
- Patent and Registration Office (Patent- och registreringsverket)
- National Space Agency (Rymdstyrelsen)
- Geological Survey (Sveriges geologiska undersökning)
- Vinnova (Verket för innovationssystem)
- Agency for Economic and Regional Growth (Tillväxtverket)
- Companies Registration Office (Bolagsverket)
- Growth Policy Analysis (Myndigheten för tillväxtpolitiska utvärderingar och analyser)
- Board for Accreditation and Conformity Assessment (Styrelsen för ackreditering och teknisk kontroll)
- Energy Agency (Energimyndigheten)
- Energy Markets Inspectorate (Energimarknadsinspektionen)
- National Electrical Safety Board (Elsäkerhetsverket)
- Svenska kraftnät (Svenska kraftnät)
- Oil Crisis Committee (Oljekrisnämnden)
- Meteorological and Hydrological Institute (SMHI)
- Radiation Safety Authority (Strålsäkerhetsmyndigheten)
- Formas (Forskningsrådet för miljö, areella näringar och samhällsbyggande (FORMAS))
- Agency for Marine and Water Management (Havs- och vattenmyndigheten)
- Environmental Protection Agency (Naturvårdsverket)
- Geotechnical Institute (Statens geotekniska institut)
- Chemicals Agency (Kemikalieinspektionen)
- Board of Agriculture (Jordbruksverket
- Swedish Forest Agency (Skogsstyrelsen)
- Food Agency (Livsmedelsverket)
- National Board of Fisheries (Fiskeriverket)
- University of Agricultural Sciences (Sveriges Lantbruksuniveristet)
- Swedish Veterinary Agency (Statens veterinärmedicinska anstalt)
- Veterinary Disciplinary Board (Veterinära ansvarsnämnden)

== Ministry of Health and Social Affairs ==
- Alcoholic Beverages Product Range Board (Alkoholsortimentsnämnden)
- eHealth Agency (eHälsomyndigheten)
- Public Health Agency (Folkhälsomyndigheten)
- Swedish Research Council for Health, Working Life (Forskningsrådet för arbetsliv, hälsa och välfärd)
- Social Insurance Agency (Försäkringskassan)
- Medical Responsibility Board (Hälso- och sjukvårdens ansvarsnämnd)
- Social Insurane Inspectorate (Inspektionen för socialförsäkringen)
- Health and Social Care Inspectorate (Inspektionen för vård och omsorg)
- Dental and Pharmaceutical Benefits Agency (Tandvårds- och läkemedelsförmånsverket)
- Medical Products Agency (Läkemedelsverket)
- Agency for Participation (Myndigheten för delaktighet)
- Family Law and Parental Support Authority (Myndigheten för familjerätt och föräldraskapsstöd)
- Agency for Health and Care Services Analysis (Myndigheten för vård- och omsorgsanays)
- Pensions Agency (Pensionsmyndigheten)
- Board of Health and Welfare (Socialstyrelsen)
- Agency for Health Technology Assessment and Assessment of Social Services (Statens beredning för medicinsk och social utvärdering)
- Board of Institutional Care (Statens institutionsstyrelse)
- Ombudsman for Children in Sweden (Barnombudsmannen)
- Agency for Support to Faith Communities (Myndigheten för stöd till trossamfund)
- Agency for Youth and Civil Society (Myndigheten för ungdoms- och civilsamhällesfrågor)

== Ministry of Finance ==
- Legal, Financial and Administrative Services Agency (Kammarkollegiet)
- Institute of Economic Research (Konjunkturinstitutet)
- Fiscal Policy Council (Finanspolitiska rådet)
- Financial Management Authority (Ekonomistyrningsverket)
- Tax Agency (Skatteverket)
- Enforcement Authority (Kronofogdemyndigheten)
- Customs Service (Tullverket)
- Financial Supervisory Authority (Finansinspektionen)
- National Debt Office (Riksgäldskontoret)
- County administrative boards (Länsstyrelserna)
- Statistics Sweden or (Statistiska Centralbyrån)
- National Property Board (Statens fastighetsverk)
- Fortifications Agency (Fortifikationsverket)
- Consumer Agency (Konsumentverket)
- Gambling Authority (Spelinspektionen)
- Lantmäteriet
- National Board of Housing, Building and Planning (Boverket)
- National Government Service Pension and Group Life Insurance Board (Statens tjänstepensions- och grupplivnämnd)
- Special Board for the Public Sector (Offentliga sektorns särskilda nämnd)
- Agency for Government Employers (Arbetsgivarverket)
- Agency for Public Management (Statskontoret)
- Government Service Centre (Statens servicecenter)
- Government Employee Pensions Board (Statens tjänstepensionsverk)
- National Board of Appeal (Statens överklagandenämnd)
- Government Disciplinary Board for Higher Officials (Statens ansvarsnämnd)
- Arbitration Tribunal for Occupational Injury Compensation (Skiljenämnden i vissa trygghetsfrågor)
- Accounting Standards Board (Bokföringsnämnden)
- Estate Agents Inspectorate (Fastighetsmäklarinspektionen)
- Board for Consumer Disputes (Allmänna reklamationsnämnden)
- The National Agency for Public Procurement (Upphandlingsmyndigheten)

== Ministry of Education and Research ==
Schools, children and youth

- National Agency for Education, or (Skolverket)
- Schools Inspectorate (Skolinspektionen)
- Agency for Special Needs Education and Schools (Specialpedagogiska skolmyndigheten)
- Sami Education Board (Sameskolstyrelsen)
- Board of Appeal for Education (Skolväsendets överklagandenämnd)

Higher education

- Public universities and colleges
- Council for Higher Education, or (Universitets- och högskolerådet)
- Board of Student Finance, or (Centrala studiestödsnämnden)
- Higher Education Appeals Board (Överklagandenämnden för högskolan)
- National Board of Appeal for Student Aid (Överklagandenämnden för studiestöd)
- Office of the Chancellor of the Swedish Universities (Universitetskanslersämbetet)
- Agency for Higher Vocational Education (Myndigheten för yrkeshögskolan)

Research

- Institute of Space Physics, or (Institutet för rymdfysik)
- National Library, or (Kungliga biblioteket)
- Polar Research Secretariat, or (Polarforskningssekretariatet)
- Space Agency, or (Rymdstyrelsen)
- Research Council, or (Vetenskapsrådet)
- Institute for Educational Research (Skolforskningsinstitutet)
- Royal Academy of Science (Kungliga Vetenskapsakademie)
- Ethical Review Authority (Etikprövningsmyndigheten)

== Ministry of Culture ==
- Election Authority (Valmyndigheten)
- Sámi Parliament (Sametinget)
- Swedish Arts Council (Statens kulturråd)
- Swedish Media Council (Statens medieråd)
- Public Art Agency (Statens konstråd)
- National Archives (Riksarkivet)
- National Heritage Board (Riksantikvarieämbetet)
- Agency for Support to Faith Communities (Myndigheten för stöd till trossamfund)
- Agency for Youth and Civil Society (Myndigheten för ungdoms- och civilsamhällesfrågor)
- Press and Broadcasting Authority (Myndigheten för press, radio och tv)
- Agency for Accessible Media (Myndigheten för tillgängliga medier)
- Agency for Cultural Policy Analysis (Myndigheten för kulturanalys)
- Handicraft Council (Nämnden för hemslöjdsfrågor)
- Arts Grants Committee (Konstnärsnämnden)
- Forum for Living History (Forum för levande historia)

Academies and institutes

- Royal Academy (Kungliga Akademien för de fria konsterna)
- Royal Swedish Academy of Music (Kungliga Musikaliska Akademien)
- Royal Academy of Letters (Kungliga Vitterhets Historie och Antikvitets Akademien)
- Institute for Language and Folklore (Institutet för språk och folkminnen)
- Swedish Film Institute (Svenska filminstitutet)

Public museums

- National Historical Museums (Statens historiska museer)
- Swedish National Museum of Fine Arts (Nationalmuseum)
- Moderna Museet
- Swedish Museum of Natural History (Naturhistoriska riksmuseet)
- Nordic Museum (Nordiska museet)
- Skansen
- National Swedish Museums of Military History (Statens försvarshistoriska museer)
- Swedish Centre for Architecture and Design (Statens centrum för arkitektur och design)
- Museum of Science and Technology (Tekniska museet)
- Museum of Work (Arbetets museum).

Performing arts

- Royal Dramatic Theatre (Dramaten)
- Royal Swedish Opera (Kungliga Operan)
- National Swedish Touring Theatre
- Performing Arts Agency (Statens musikverk)

== Ministry of the Environment ==
- Formas (Forskningsrådet för miljö, areella näringar och samhällsbyggande)
- Chemicals Agency (Kemikalieinspektionen)
- Nuclear Waste Fund (Kärnavfallsfonden)
- Environmental Protection Agency (Naturvårdsverket)
- Geotechnical Institute (Statens geotekniska institut)
- Radiation Safety Authority (Strålsäkerhetsmyndigheten)
- Water Supply and Sewage Tribunal (Statens va-nämnd)
- Swedish Meteorological and Hydrological Institute (Sveriges meteorologiska och hydrologiska institut)
- Agency for Marine and Water Management (Havs- och vattenmyndigheten)

== Ministry of Infrastructure ==
- Svenska kraftnät
- Electrical Safety Board (Elsäkerhetsverket)
- Energy Markets Inspectorate (Energimarknadsinspektionen)
- Civil Aviation Administration (Luftfartsverket)
- Agency for Digital Government (Myndigheten för digital förvaltning)
- Oil Crisis Board (Oljekrisnämnden)
- Post and Telecom Authority (Post- och telestyrelsen)
- Maritime Administration (Sjöfartsverket)
- Energy Agency (Statens energimyndighet)
- Road and Transport Research Institute (Statens väg- och transportforskningsinstitut)
- Transport Analysis (Trafikanalys)
- Transport Administration (Trafikverket)
- Transport Agency (Transportstyrelsen)

== Defunct agencies ==
Some historic government agencies have been merged with other agencies or simply closed down.

- Aliens Appeals Board of Sweden, or Utlänningsnämnden, UN. Discontinued and replaced by Migration Courts on 31 March 2006, when the new Aliens Act entered into force.
- Swedish National Board of Education, or Skolöverstyrelsen, governed primary and secondary schools. Was replaced by the Swedish National Agency for Education in 1991 when the responsibility for schools was transferred from the state to the municipalities.
- Swedish National Board of Universities and Colleges, or Universitets- och högskoleämbetet, was responsible for higher education until 1992 when the central agency was abolished. It was replaced with an agency with a considerably more limited field of operations, the Office of the Chancellor of the Swedish Universities, or Kanslersämbetet. The Swedish National Agency for Higher Education was set up on 1 July 1995, incorporating the Office of the Chancellor, the Council for the Renewal of Undergraduate Education (Grundutbildningsrådet) and parts of the Swedish National Agency for Services to Universities.
- Swedish National Integration Board, or Integrationsverket. Located in Norrköping. Field of operations: The Swedish Integration Board to ensure that the visions and goals of Sweden's integration policies have an impact in the various areas of society. Closed down on 1 July 2007.
- Swedish National Plant Variety Board, or Statens växtsortnämnd. Field of operations: issues relating to plant breeding and the admission of plants into the different classification lists. Made a part of the Swedish National Board of Agriculture on 1 January 2006.
- Swedish National Public Transport Agency, or Rikstrafiken on 1 April 2010.
- The Railway Safety Fencing Board (Swedish: Stängselnämnden) was a government agency responsible for settling conflicts between municipalities and rail transport companies regarding the building of fences along railways. The board existed 1976—2008. It only decided in one case, which occurred in 1977.
- Swedish Seed Testing and Certification Institute, or Statens utsädeskontroll. Field of operations: seed testing. Made a part of the Swedish National Board of Agriculture on 1 January 2006.
- The State Institute for Racial Biology or Statens institut för rasbiologi. Field of operations: studying eugenics and human genetics. Established in 1922 and changed to State Institute for Human Genetics in 1958 and merged into Uppsala University.

== See also ==
- List of Swedish government enterprises
- Government agencies in Iceland
- Government agencies in Norway
