= Agriculture in Sweden =

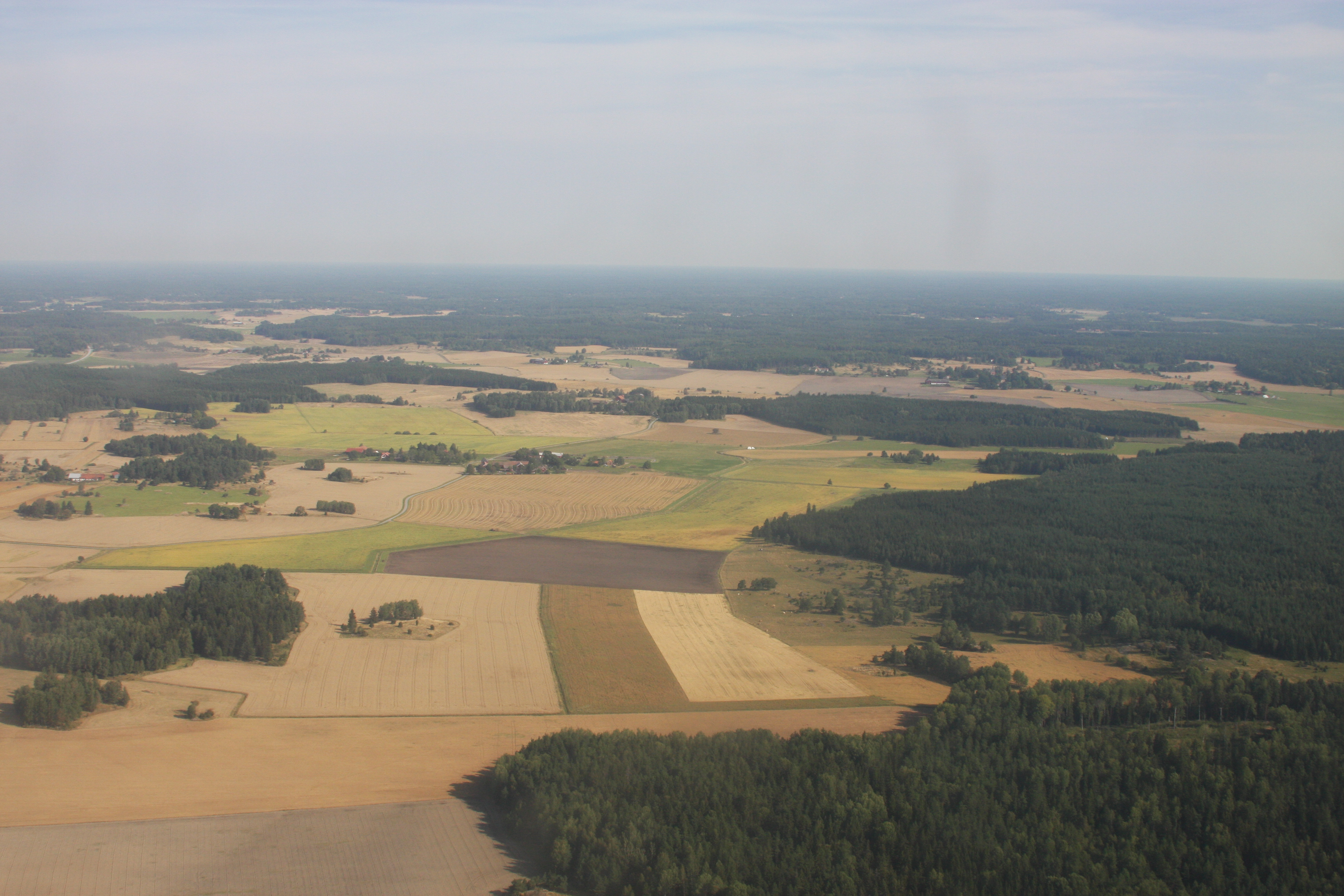
Mixed arable and woodland areas in Sigtuna Municipality, close to Arlanda Airport.

Köppen climate classifications applied to Sweden. Tundra (grey), Sub-arctic (dark blue), Humid Continental (light blue), Oceanic (green).

Agriculture in Sweden differs by region. This is due to different soils and different climate zones, with many parts of the country being more suitable to forestry. It makes more economic sense to dedicate land to forestry than agriculture in the northern and mountainous parts of the country.

The southern tip of Sweden is the most agriculturally productive region. Sweden has quite short growing seasons in most parts of the country and that limits the species and productivity of agriculture. The south has the longest growing season, which in some parts of the south is in excess of 240 days. Wheat, rapeseed and other oil plants, together with sugar beet are common in southern Sweden, while barley and oat are more important further north. Barley and oats are grown mostly for animal feed, especially for pigs and poultry. The Central Swedish lowland is the traditional centre of agriculture in Sweden. Historically, agriculture has been one of the principal sectors of the Swedish economy.

Agricultural production statistics are available online. In the 21st century the Swedish government has committed to securing elimination of carbon emissions from the agricultural industry by 2030.

The food production represented by fishing and aquaculture is not significant in economic terms to the Swedish economy as a whole. However, these activities are important to coastal towns.

== Geographical factors ==
The climate of Sweden is, for the central and southern areas, milder and drier than some countries to the immediate south. This clemency is due to a prevailing west wind and to the influence of the Gulf Stream. The climate in Northern Sweden is largely classified as sub-arctic or tundra.

Approximately one quarter of Sweden's landmass comprises Lapland. Norrland as a whole amounts to 60% of the landmass but contains around 12% of the population. These areas, characterised by lakes, mountains, forests and tundra, are dominated by forestry, logging and mining. The northernmost regions are also inhabited by the Sámi peoples, whose traditional animal husbandry strengths were and are in connection with herding reindeer.

Central and southern Sweden provide the areas of key agricultural importance.

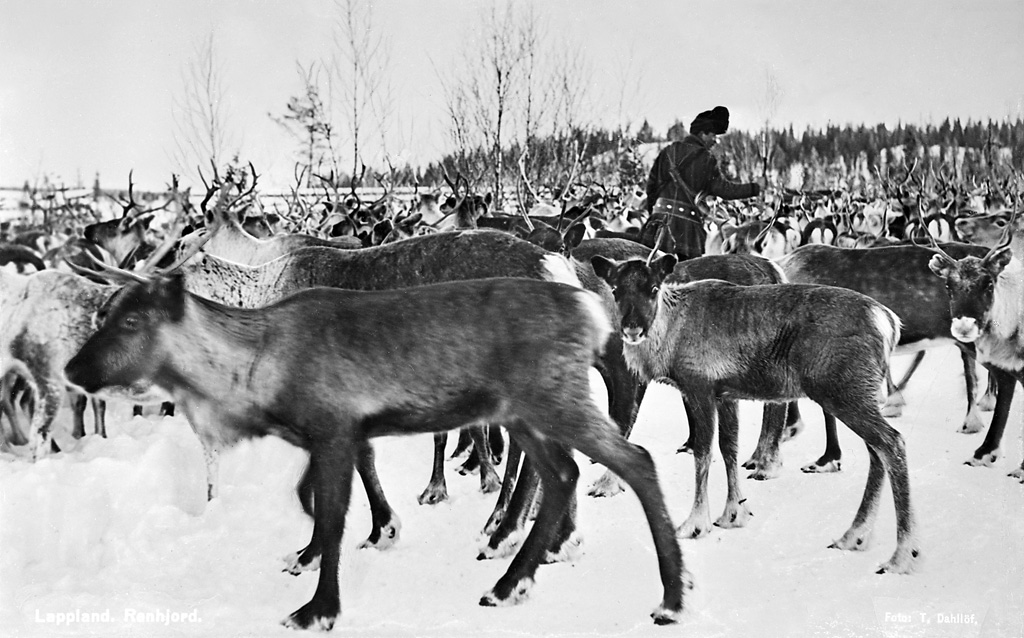
Jukkasjärvi, Swedish Lapland sometime in the mid 20th century (1930 -1949): animal management by Sámi herders in the northern wintertime.

The island of Gotland, off the eastern coast, is Sweden's largest island and is an important centre for food processing and agriculture.

== Current summary ==
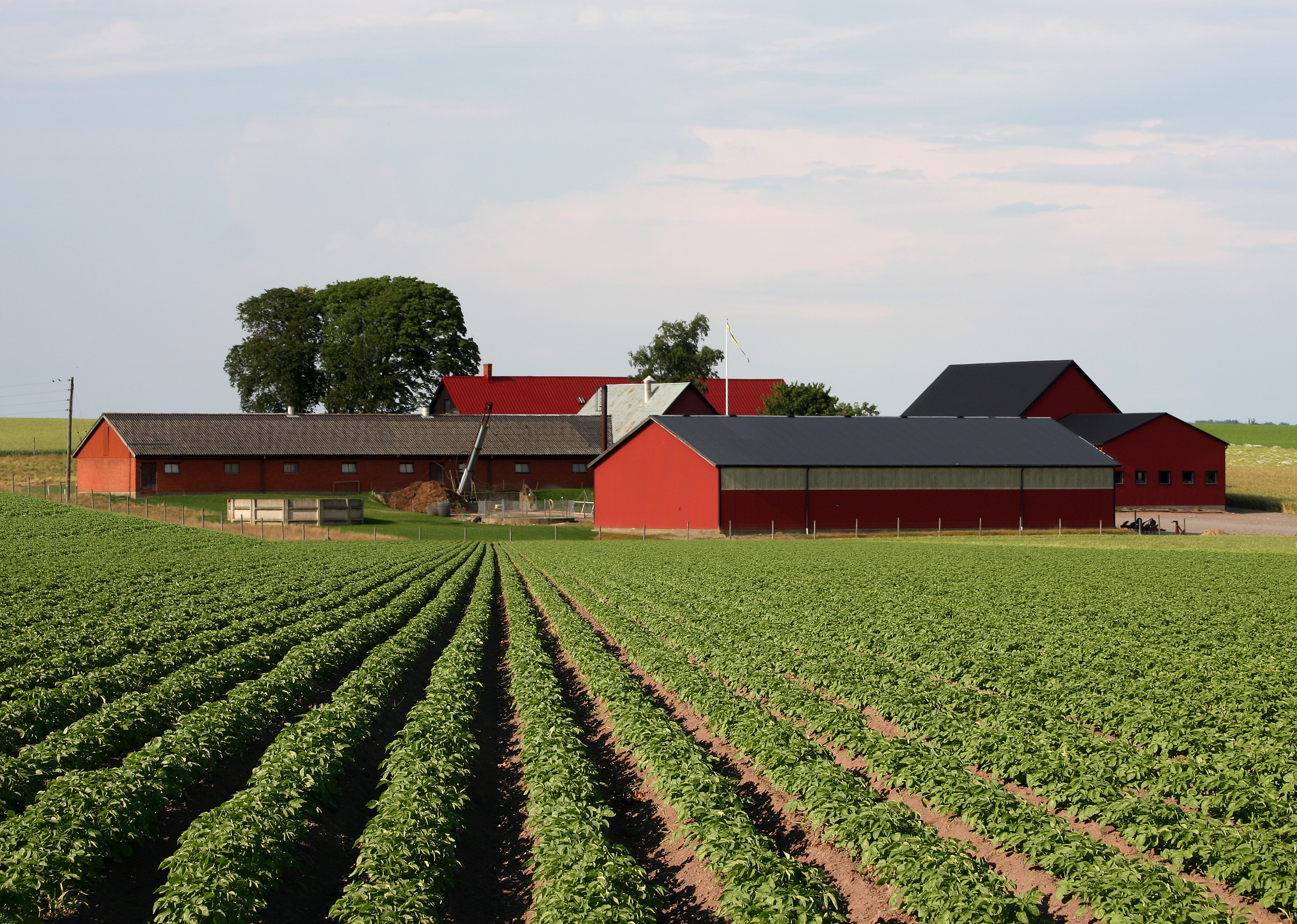
Potato field in Sweden (2009) with experimental cropping of the Amflora potato variety.

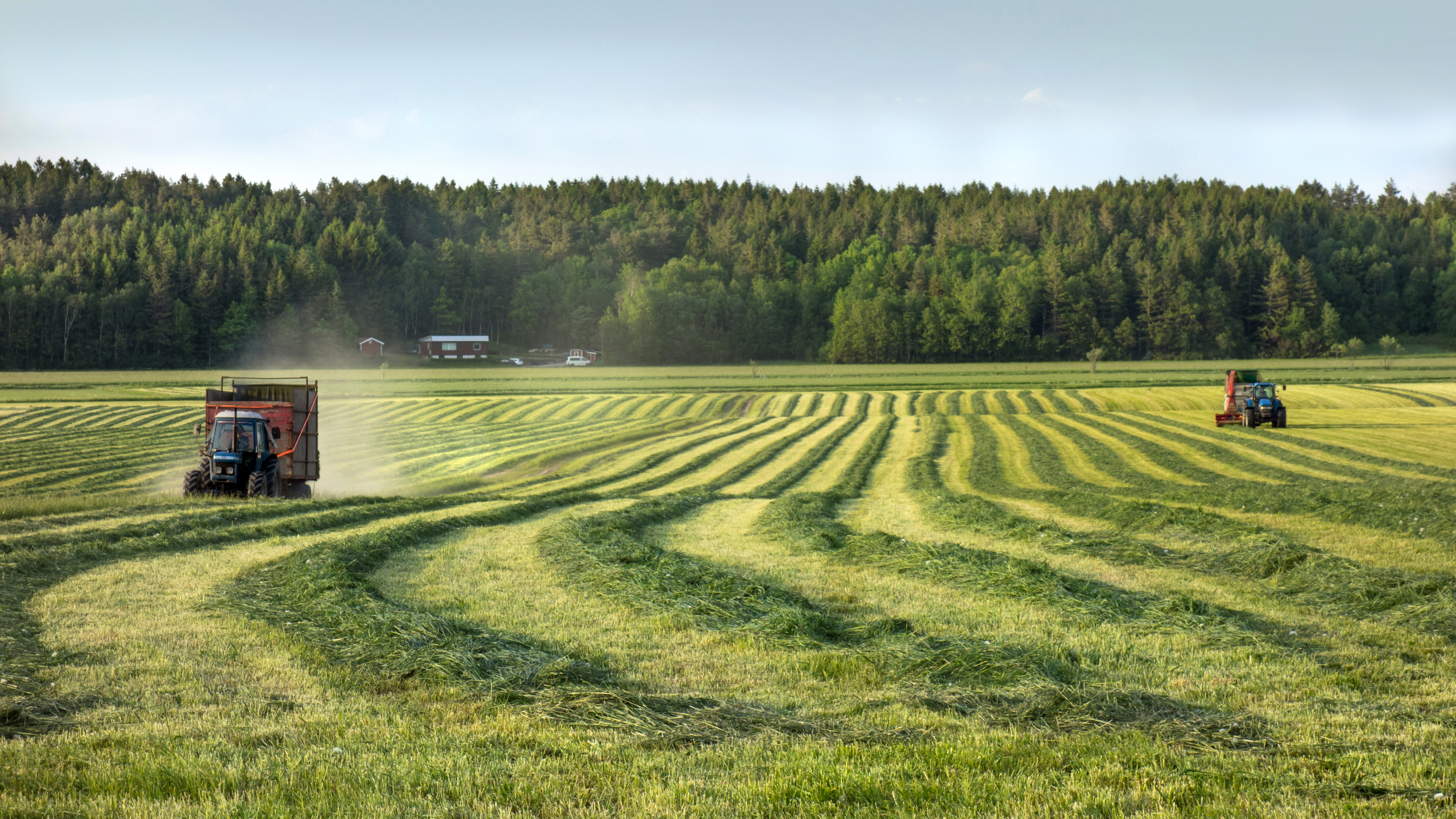
Mechanised silage production in southwestern Sweden: dry, flat arable land with adjoining woodlands sheltering well-maintained buildings (2017)

In 2023 overall gross farm income was SEK 9.1 billion, establishing a 50% drop compared to the previous year. This difference is ascribed to falling grain prices and static production outlays. The overall gross farm income figure is, however, similar to that applying in the period 2019–2021.

Dairy farming is the largest sector in economic terms, and is responsible for 20 per cent of the value of all Swedish agricultural production. Pork and poultry production are also relatively large, while sheep and lamb production are quite limited. Sheep and lamb producers and wool production are not able to compete with countries (such as Australia and New Zealand) that have year-round green pastures.

The Swedish agricultural sector (excluding forestry and the food industry) employs 177,600 people, approximating to 1.5 percent of the Swedish workforce. There are 72,000 farms and other agricultural businesses, together representing half the 1970 equivalent. The average farm has 88 acres (36 ha) of fields.

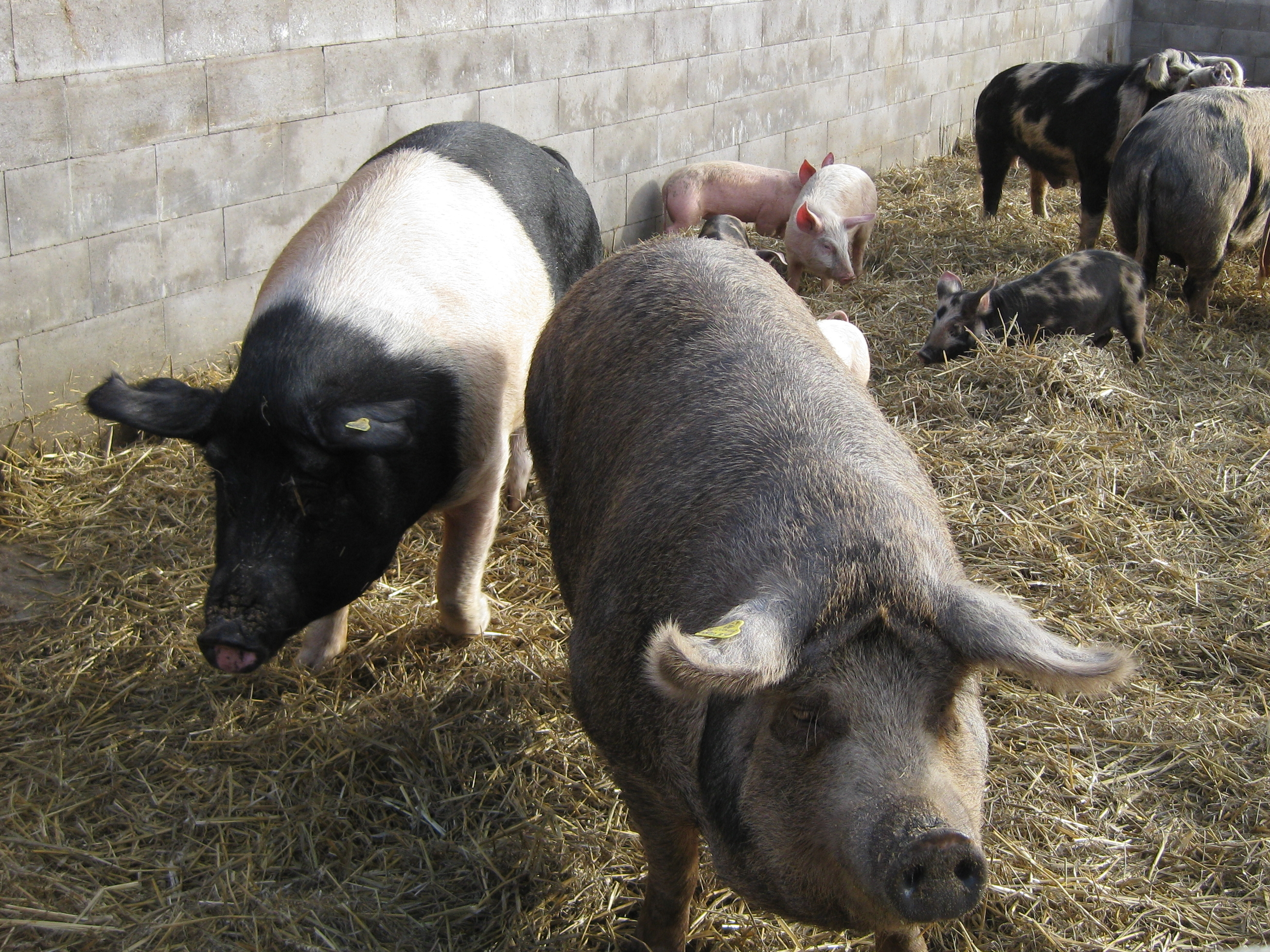
Mixed pig breeds enclosed together at a farm in Scania, southern Sweden. Front left is a rare Angeln Saddleback. Front right is a Swedish Linderödssvin.

== Policy ==
Government policy is under the control of the Swedish Board of Agriculture, which provides online information as to policy and statistics. Sweden's agricultural planning is in the context of the European Union Common Agricultural Policy. The most recent 5 year strategic Plan filed by Sweden runs from 2023. The Plan encompasses the fact that only 10% of the land surface is used for agriculture, with 70% being used for forestry.

== History ==
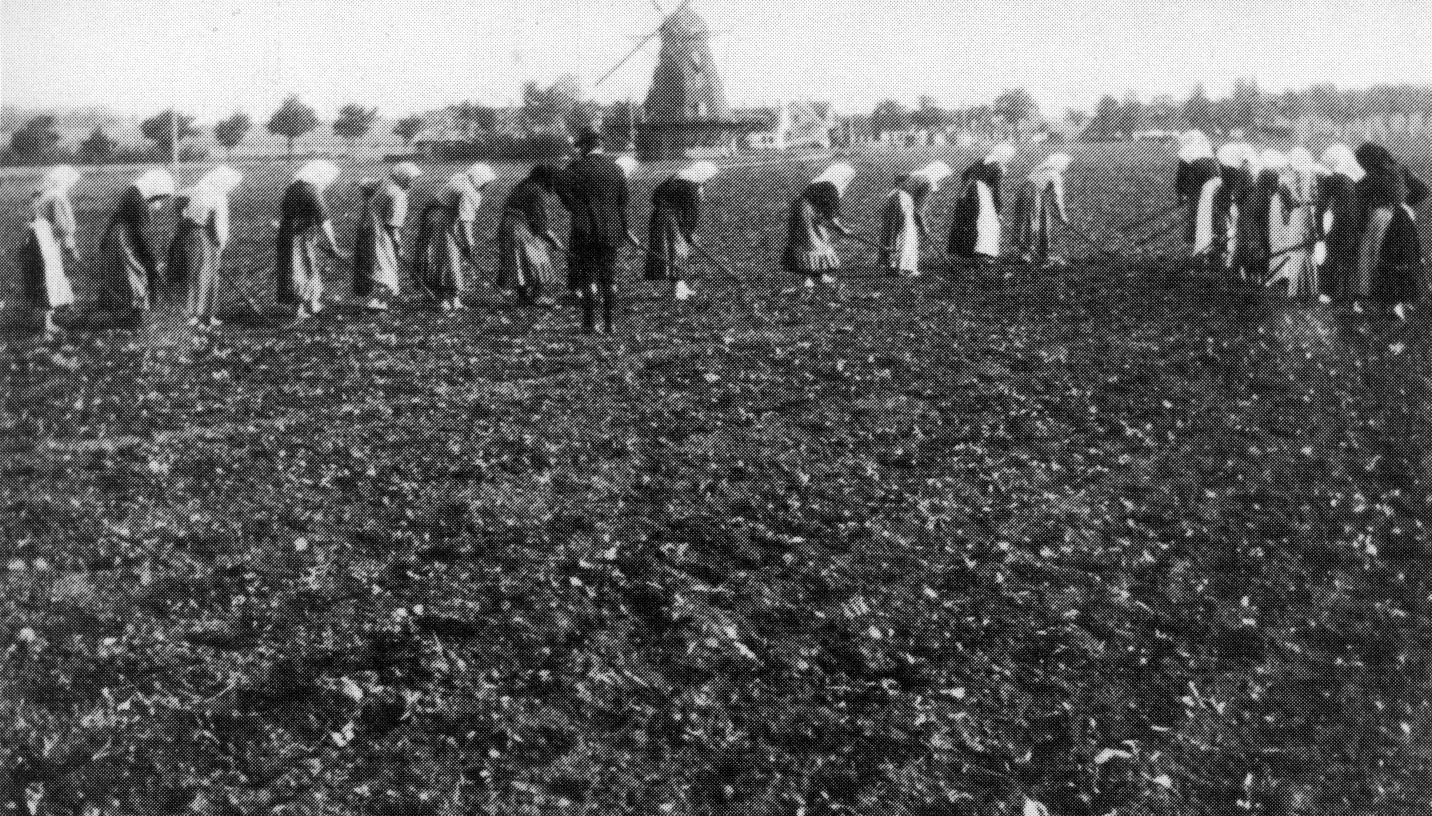
Sugar beet plantation at Säbyholm estate in the late 19th century.

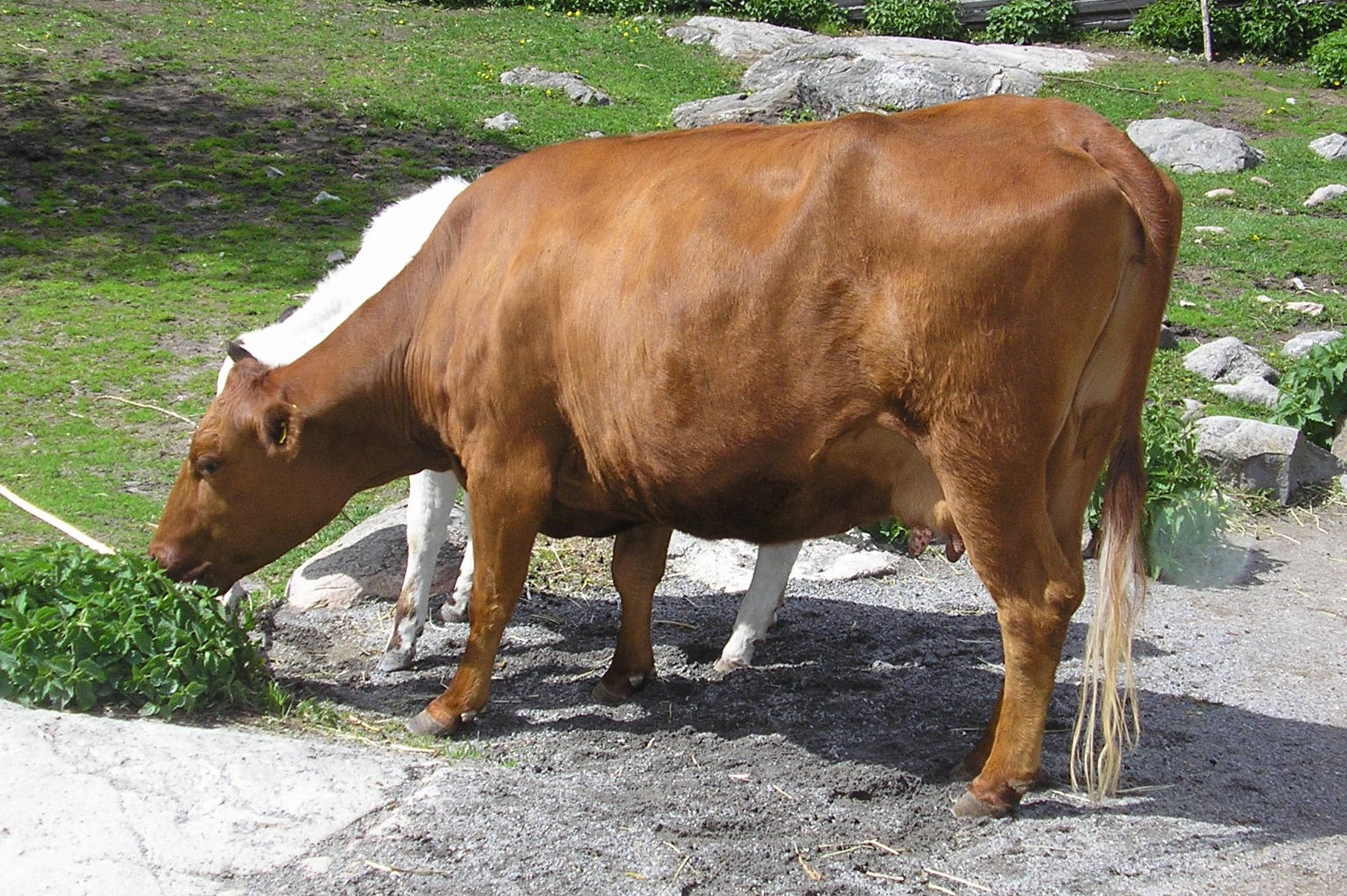
Swedish Red cattle are the most common dairy cattle in Sweden.

=== Origins ===
Agriculture and animal husbandry took place in the area of modern Sweden during the Stone Age. Barley was the most important crop, but wheat, millet and flax were also cultivated. The christianization of Sweden, around the year 1000, led to improvements in agriculture due to the influx of knowledge of more advanced cultivation methods from southern countries. During the entire medieval period, monastic gardens spread knowledge of foreign plants suitable for cultivation, and of agricultural methods.

=== 16th to 19th centuries ===
In the 16th century Gustaf Vasa took a personal interest in improvement of the royal estate, and his reign saw agriculture flourish. In particular, Sweden regularly exported cereals. This continued until the reign of Charles XII in the early 18th century, by which time wars had taken a heavy toll on the population and the cereal-producing Baltic provinces were lost.

By the mid-18th century land reforms were initiated (storskiftet) by means of which scattered land plots around villages were progressively redistributed into coherent holdings. This offered the possibility for a more rational approach to farming. Swedish scientists also gave attention to the improvement of agriculture, with botanist Carl Linnaeus and agricultural chemist Johan Gottschalk Wallerius as the foremost representatives of this trend. However, mercantilist views of the era guided most government activities.

Animal husbandry came increasingly into focus later in the century. Selected foreign breeds were purchased and made available in breeding stations (1702–1864).

All farms in Sweden were taxed based on their productive capacity, which caused a rise in manorial organisation. This was a social and economic system that allowed the nobility to control labourers whilst providing for their needs. In the early 18th century, according to mantel records, approximately one third of the land was owned in this way by the aristocracy. Due to two different enclosure movements, manorialism rapidly disappeared.

=== General ===
In the wake of the Finnish War of 1808–1809, agricultural improvements received significant interest from the Swedish government and from private actors. An important role was played by the Royal Swedish Academy of Agriculture (founded in 1811) as well as by the Rural Economy and Agricultural Societies. Such associations were founded in most Swedish counties at around this time. The production of distilled beverages, brännvin, was regulated and the land reforms were continued. New areas, especially wetlands, were used for cultivation, and cultivation methods were improved. This was especially true for the production of fodder, which benefited from the cultivation of nitrogen-fixing plants such as clover and alfalfa. Many meadows were converted to fodder crops, thereby increasing the amount of fodder available. Improved crop cultivation received attention in the first half of the 19th century. Grain quickly became Sweden's primary export (instead of being an import).

=== Southern Sweden ===
Jordmobilisering (soil mobilization) is the term given collectively to the changes during the 19th century in Skåne (or in English Scania) in southern Sweden whereby land use became increasingly rationalised and intensive. This included changes to the use of land, its drainage and exploitation of the greater areas that became available through whole lakes being drained. Several of these major projects took place, notably that in the 1860s of draining the vast lake Näsbyholmssjön west of Skurup. New agricultural techniques raised productivity, and new plant products became available. These changes resulted in increased production of potatoes, wheat and sugar beet. Land became more readily purchasable, and banks and savings societies grew up accordingly. Agriculture became more market-oriented and commercialised. This new prosperity changed the look of the countryside, where many new impressive residences were constructed for farmers and landowners. By contrast, labourers residing in clusters of modest cottages or scattered in the many small coastal villages provided a labour resource. The higher numbers of landless labourers amounted to more than all classes of landed households, meaning that poverty caused many to move away from the countryside whether to emigrate abroad or to take employment in the towns and cities.

=== Growth of the dairy sector and industrialization (1860–1960) ===
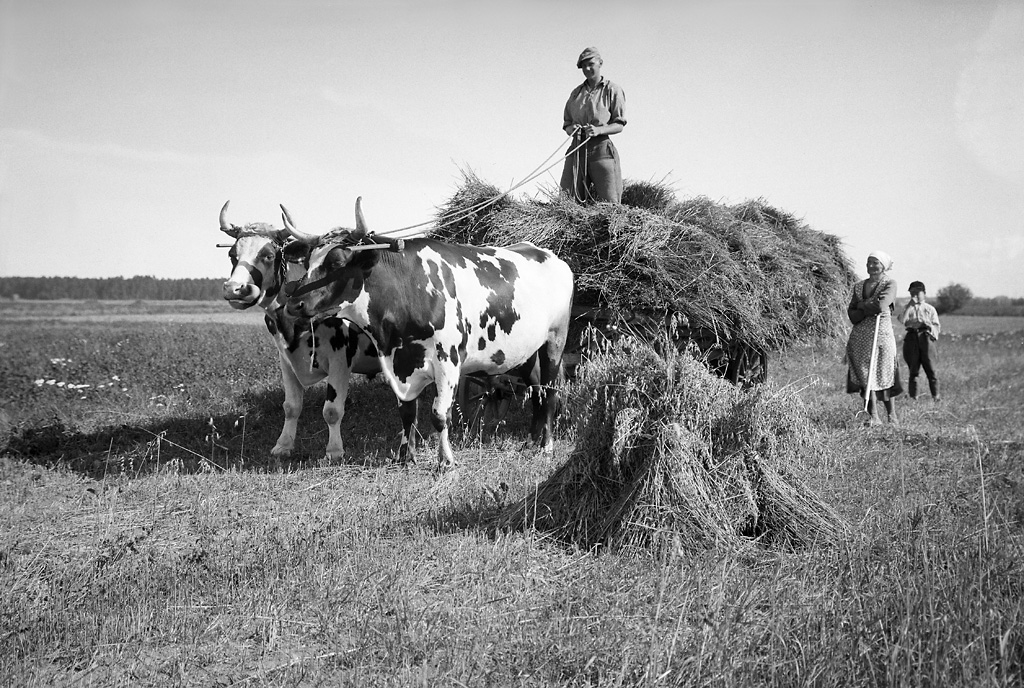
A team of oxen work the land and pull a heavy load of sheaves. The standing stooks are in a pattern as stacked manually (Örebro 1934)

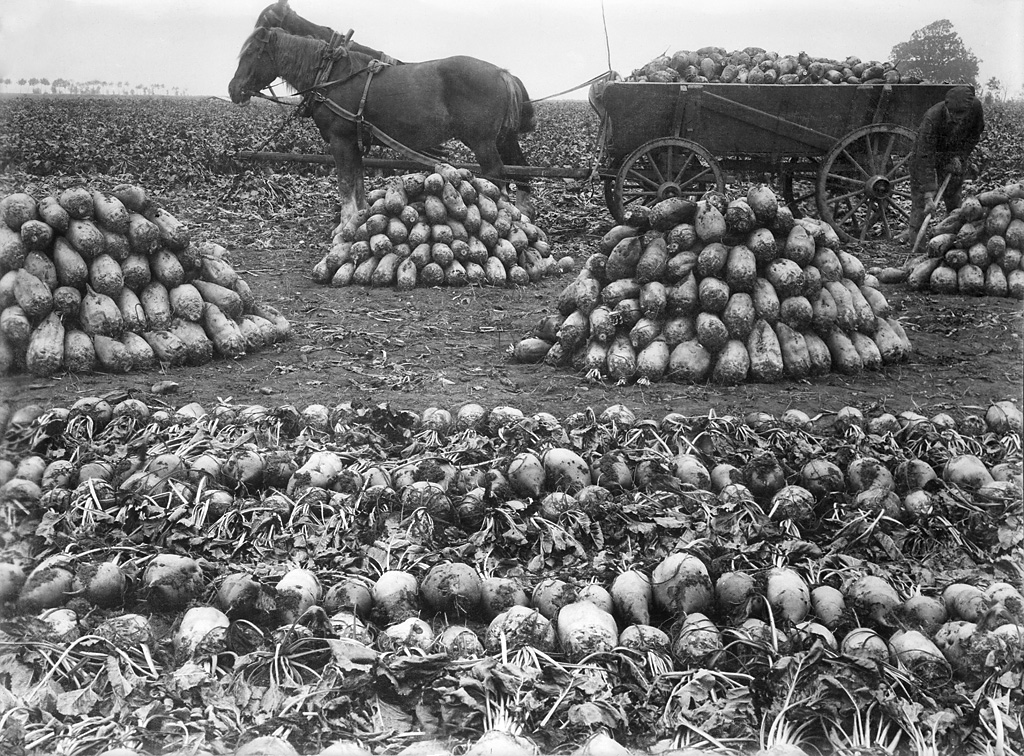
A team of horses pulls a wooden cart loaded with sugar beet, whilst in the foreground a worker spades the beet-heap. Southern Sweden, Skåne (Scania) or Halland (period 1910–1919).

From the late 1860s, dairy production, and in particular production of butter, became central to the Swedish agricultural economy. A progressively larger portion of farmland was devoted to fodder production, and the farmed area increased through to the 1920s. Milk- and dairy-related income was the most important source of income for Swedish agricultural businesses around the turn of the 20th century. Swedish cereal exports largely ceased, to be replaced by import of cereals for bread. Conversely, significant exports of butter commenced, followed later by exports of pork and live pigs. In the first years of the 20th century, Sweden exported 16,000-20,000 tons of butter a year.

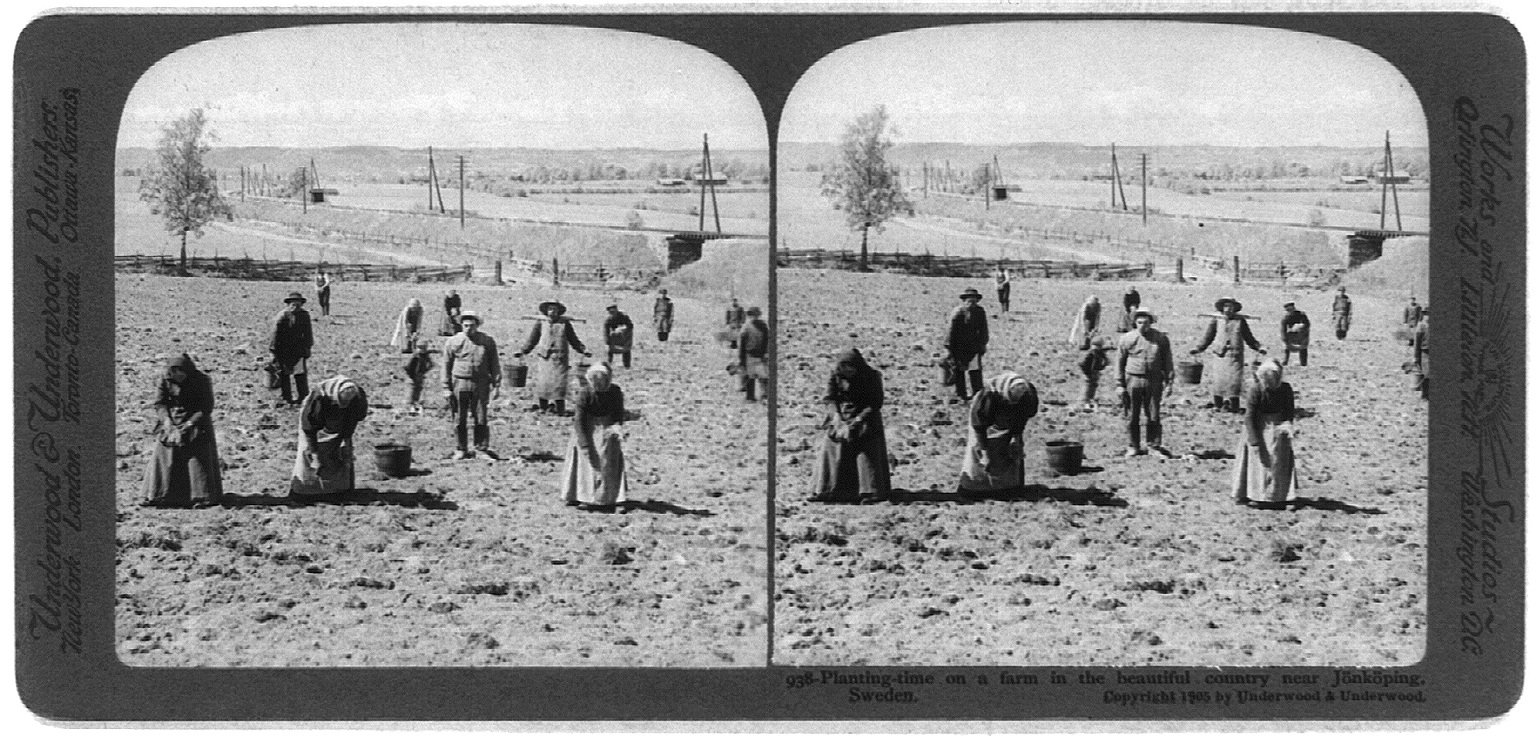
Highly labour-intensive planting exercise where labour includes both men and women. (Stereo image, Jönköping 1905)

In the late 1940s, milking machines replaced hand milking and tractors started to replace the use of oxen or horses. Alfa Laval became a well-known manufacturer and brand of milking machines. Whereas in the early part of the twentieth century farming powered by animals was commonplace, in the 1950s, large-scale mechanisation occurred due to cheap supplies of petrol. The Swedish agricultural workforce was reduced by 60 percent between 1945 and 1970, thereby freeing labour for employment in industry.

=== Deregulation and re-regulation (1989–2000) ===
In 1989, Sweden deregulated its agricultural policy and abolished many subsidies and price controls deriving from the 1930s when agriculture experienced an economic crisis. In 1995, on Sweden joining the European Union, Swedish agriculture became subject to regulation by means of the Common Agricultural Policy.

=== 2000 onwards ===
By 1998 Sweden had achieved full self-sufficiency for most animal products, though around 80% of artificial feedstuffs depended on imports. Soybean cake, mainly from Brazil, was a significant component in supply. The focus on environmental issues raised by farming practices dates from the beginning of the 21st century (see below). At that time, organic farming represented approximately 10% of Sweden's arable land in use for organic farming.

Swedish agricultural cooperatives, in particular in the dairy, meat and grain sectors, during the period 1990 to 2020 experienced a need for major change by establishing mergers or alliances to form larger businesses. Very large cooperatives in Sweden have been found to reflect high levels of satisfaction with the structure and functioning of the institution.

== Agricultural production statistics ==
=== Economic databases for agriculture ===
The Swedish Agency for Agriculture collects, and makes publicly available, statistical information to assess the impact of economic trends in the agricultural industry. The Agricultural Economic Survey (JEU) for the period 2014 - 2021 provides key figures and standardized revenues for selected major specialised sectors of the agricultural economy. In this period, the industries chosen were for milk, beef and pig enterprises. The underlying data selection and analysis differs from and are designed to supplement the more traditional compositions contained in the statistical report JO0202, Agricultural Economic Survey, which was published on February 24, 2023 (relating to 2021 data). These databases are for the purpose of showing revenues and costs annually for research and profitability studies. The information from over a thousand farms is annually transmitted under obligation to the Directorate-General for Agriculture and Rural Development (DG AGRI) at the EU Commission for its purposes.

=== Arable land ===
The total area of arable land was 2,537,900 hectares in 2022. This remained almost the same in 2023. There is in process of collection and updating a long time series arable statistics database JO1901 covering the years 1866 – 2020. The series indicates a progression from small-scale subsistence agriculture towards larger scale and more specialised commercial production. It shows a maximum of 3.7 million hectares under arable cultivation in the early 1950s. This had declined to approximately 2.5 million hectares in 2020.

There has been an average increase of approximately 7% in the price of arable land in the period 2021 – 2022. The price of arable and pasture land has doubled over a period of 10 years and in 2022 this resulted in per hectare prices of SEK 130,500 for arable and SEK 47,500 for pasture.

2021 total agricultural production was SEK 71.6 billion comparing to 2020 at SEK 64.7 billion. The difference is attributed to a 13% increase in vegetable production. These figures reflect increased prices for grain and oilseeds. Increases in the value of kitchen and nursery plants (at 11%) contrast to a 20% decrease in fruit growing values (due to lower prices).

In 2022 the total area in organic production (including land converting to organic production) was 597,400 hectares. These production areas in 2022 represented 77% arable and 23% pasture. Overall the areas cultivated show a decrease of 9,500 hectares from the previous year, itself a decline from the high-point of organic production in 2019. Around 12% of grain in Sweden is organically farmed, and so is approximately 25% of pasture and mowing land.

=== Animal production ===
The actual figures for 2020 and 2021 compared in respect of the value of animal products indicate a modest increase from SEK 28.8 billion (2020) to SEK 30.4 billion (2021). In 2021, beef accounted for SEK 6.7 billion; pigs for SEK 5.1 billion; milk for SEK 11.9 billion; eggs for SEK 1.9 billion (a 7% decrease); and poultry (a 15% increase) for SEK 2.6 billion. Preliminary figures for 2022-2023 suggest that 2022 was a year with 1% greater value of animal production than 2023. However, these predictive figures over a 5-year period have been an average of 24% adrift of the actual achieved figures.

Organic livestock production saw a slight decline over the years 2021 to 2022. 2022 saw the production of 459,100 tonnes of organic milk (a 5% decrease); 18,100 tonnes of organic eggs (a 2% decrease); 20,300 tonnes organic cattle slaughter (2% decrease); 850 tonnes of organic sheep and lambs (7% decrease); 6,400 tonnes pigs (4% decrease); and 1,280 tonnes for organic broilers (3% decrease).

== Environmental impact of farming ==
Sweden in the 21st century has committed to good environmental practice across a broad front of activity. In 1999 the Swedish Parliament approved 15 national environmental quality objectives, and in 2007 a further one was added. These key objectives to be supported by legislation, financial changes and education included: A Varied Agricultural Landscape, Zero Eutrophication, and A Non-Toxic Environment. By 2007, the main impacts of concern emanating from the agricultural sector were identified as eutrophication, global warming and resource use. In addition, loss of biodiversity due to farming methods was highlighted. The Parliamentary Committee on Environment and Agriculture is responsible for reporting to the Parliament on (amongst other things) agriculture, forestry and fishing. Policy attention (measured by Parliamentary bills for legislation) in linking agriculture with biodiversity and toxicity issues has been considered by some to be attributable to stakeholder pressure. A study in Öland (2021) suggested that the top-down governmental control model was found alongside farmers’ belief that agriculture did not contribute to climate or environmental problems. Such a combination was considered highly unsustainable.

Fossilfritt Sverige (Fossil-free Sweden) is a major programme of the Swedish government to remove altogether fossil fuels from the Swedish economy. Reports are made to the government as to problems and progress in reaching the targets chosen. Such a Report was filed in December 2022. The programme is focussed on 22 individual industries each with their own roadmap and sets of targets, which are monitored for progress. Agriculture is one such industry, where the target for reduction to zero by 2030 is specifically for carbon emissions, which in 2019 amounted to 6.9 million tonnes and 13% of the emissions for the entire Swedish economy. Additionally, the Federation of Swedish Farmers (LRF) has produced sustainability targets for the industry in respect of other kinds of environmental impact.

== Fisheries and aquaculture ==
=== Responsible departments and government agencies ===
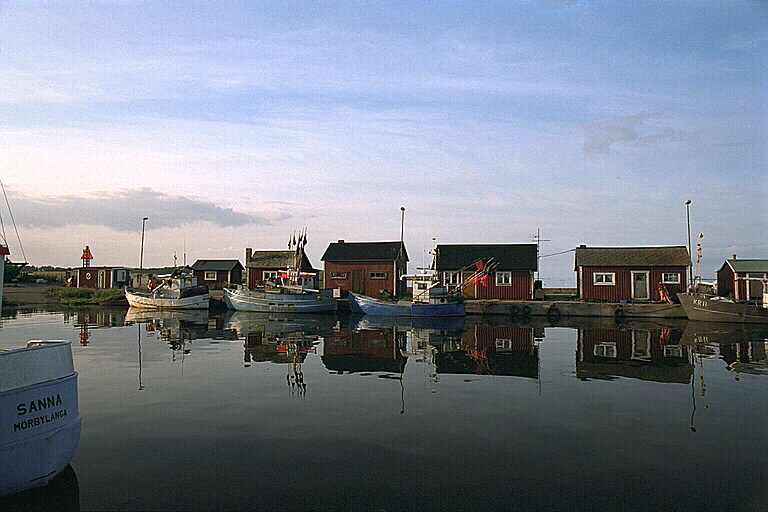
Fishing harbour at Gräsgårds (2000) by Bengt A. Lundberg. The small scale of the fishing boats is that of the majority of the Swedish-registered operators.

Between 1948 and 2011 fishing and aquaculture were controlled by the National Board of Fisheries operating from coastal Gothenburg. Since 2011 these matters fall to be controlled by the Swedish Agency for Marine and Water Management (SwAM). The organisation is supervised by the Ministry for Rural Affairs, which is responsible for the application by Sweden of the Common Fisheries Policy of the European Union.

=== Fishing ===
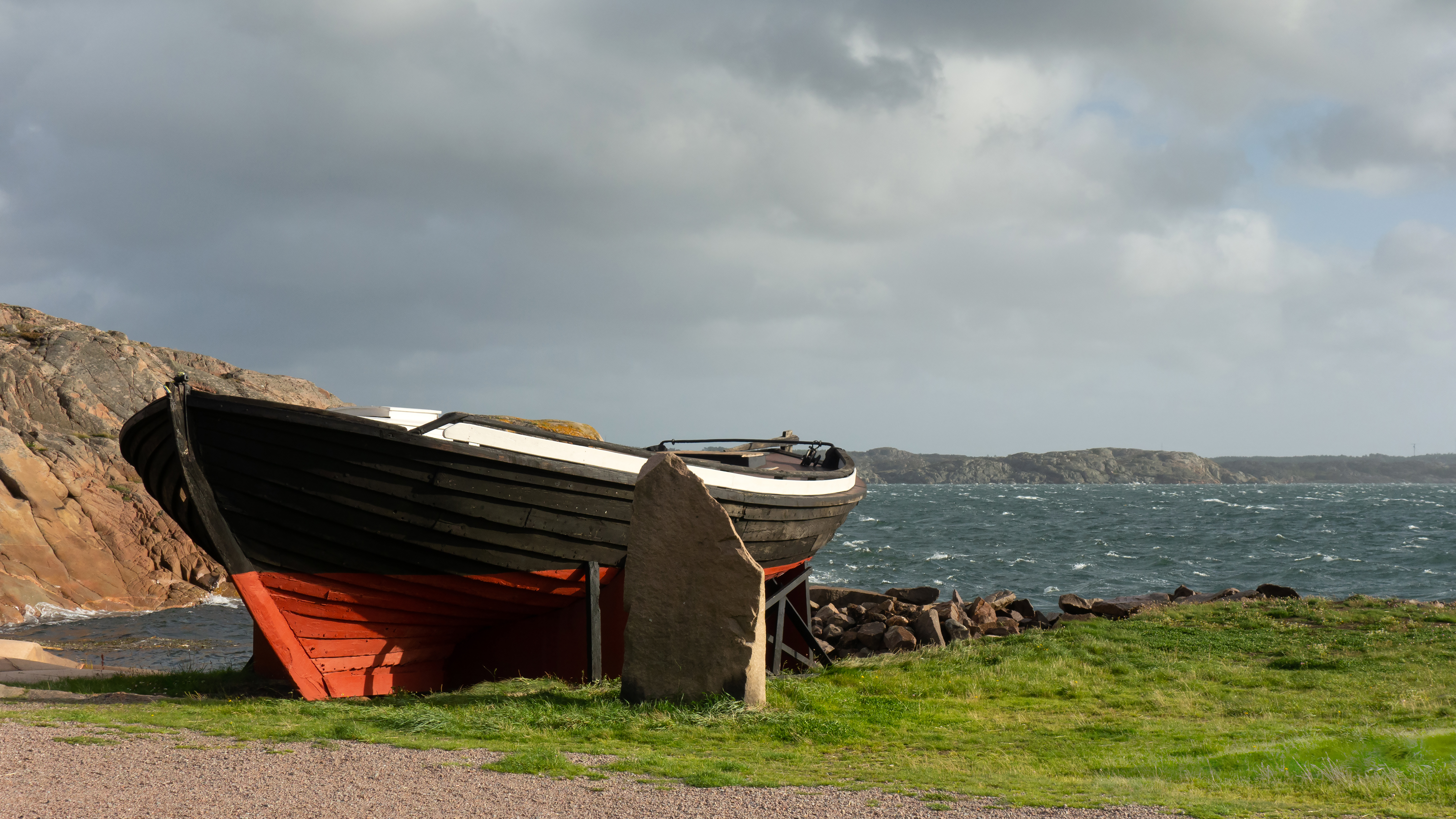
2019 Photograph of typical Swedish shallow fishing boat displayed at Vikarvet Museum close to Lysekil, a small town fishing port.

Sweden's long coastline and 90,000 lakes have generated fishing opportunities both inland and to the west. The eastern side borders the Baltic Sea (which presents eutrophication as a barrier to fishing). The key fishing centres on the western coast. In 2016, the majority of businesses involved in both the fishing and the aquaculture sectors in Sweden were small. Their contribution to the Swedish economy at 0.10% was limited but remained significant in terms of the livelihoods and aspect of coastal areas. As at 2017 there were 1232 Swedish-registered vessels involved in fishing, the majority of which (85%) were under 12m length. That year the sea-based catch was approximately 221800 tonnes, whereas that taken from lakes and inland waters was approximately 10 800 tonnes. In 2018, including shellfish, Sweden produced 0.2 million tonnes of fish, most of which related to fishing (73%) as opposed to aquaculture. Its value was 182.4 US dollars.

=== Aquaculture ===
As at 2017, aquaculture was responsible for approximately 6% of the total fish production of Sweden. Production of fish, mussels, oysters and crayfish requires a water use permit and compliance with environmental standards. Rainbow trout and blue mussels are key fish farming species in Sweden, and water recirculation systems allied with traditional box farming are regarded as creating an environmentally sustainable Swedish aquaculture. In 2022 Sweden produced by aquaculture 2300 tonnes of fish for human consumption (approximately 9500 live tonnes). This represents a drop of 20% in production compared to 2021.

=== Consumption ===
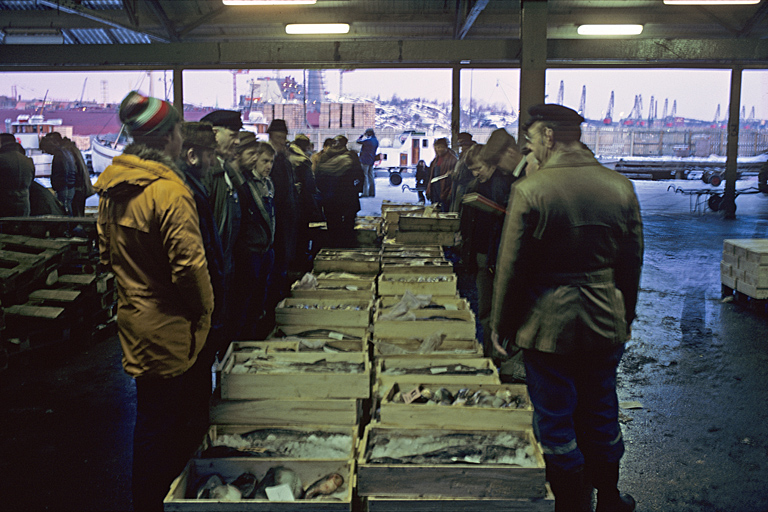
Gothenburg harbour where boxes of fish await sale (1977) by Pål-Nils Nilsson

As at 2017, the consumption of fish and fish products per person remained stable (25‒33 kg) over the whole period since 1987. In 2017 there was a surplus of imported fish and fish products to the value of 0.8 billion US dollars compared to Swedish exports.
