= Formas =

Formas is a surname. Notable people with the surname include:

- Emma Formas de Dávila (1883–?), a Chilean artist
- José Manuel Ortúzar Formas (1796–1848), a Chilean lawyer and politician
