= Finansdepartementet =

Finansdepartementet may refer to:

- Ministry of Finance (Sweden), the government office responsible for economic matters, such as central government budget and taxes, in Sweden
- Ministry of Finance (Norway), the government office responsible for state finance, including the state budget, taxation and economic policy, in Norway
