= VetBact =

Content
- Description: A database containing information about bacteria of interest in veterinary medicine
- Organisms: Bacteria

Contact
- Research center: SLU
- Laboratory: BVF
- Authors: Karl-Erik Johansson and Staffan Tamm
- Release date: 2006

Access
- Website: www.vetbact.org

Tools
- Web: VetBactLab

Miscellaneous
- Version: 2.0

The VetBact database contains information about bacteria that are of interest in veterinary medicine. The database was developed at the Swedish University of Agricultural Sciences and the National Veterinary Institute in Uppsala, Sweden.

VetBact is primarily intended as a tool for veterinary students and their teachers, but has also proved useful for veterinary practitioners and students attending other academic courses in bacteriology.

== History ==
The first version of the database appeared in Swedish on the website of the National Veterinary Institute in 2006. The database received a major update and was re-launched as 'VetBakt 1.0' under its own domain name, vetbakt.se, in the following year. In 2010, a bilingual (English/Swedish) version known as 'VetBact 2.0' was released and the domain name was changed to vetbact.org. In 2011, three additional modules (VetBactBlog, VetBactQuiz and VetBactLab) were added to the VetBact website.

== Contents of the database ==
This database contains information about over 200 species (and subspecies) of bacteria. These species belong to more than 80 genera and represent 9 of the 29 bacterial phyla. The information about each species comprises etymology, taxonomy, morphology, metabolism, biochemical reactions, host, disease, phylogeny etc. There are more than 300 images for which non-commercial use is permitted under a Creative Commons BY-NC-ND 2.5 license.

== The modules VetBactBlog, VetBactQuiz and VetBactLab ==
These course-oriented modules can be found under the heading 'Course material' on VetBact.

- VetBactBlog is, as the name suggests, a blog. It offers an RSS feed and provides space for discussions.
- VetBactQuiz contains a number of questions for veterinary students. Automatic feed-back is given as soon as an answer has been submitted.
- VetBactLab is intended to complement, but not replace, experiments in the laboratory. The purpose of these experiments in silico, or virtual experiments, is to teach students how to identify bacteria that cause various diseases in animals.

The VetBact database, and its modules, is based on Free and Open Source Software (FOSS) and is now an integral part of the curriculum at the Swedish University of Agricultural Sciences.
