= Pink Programming =

Nonprofit in Sweden

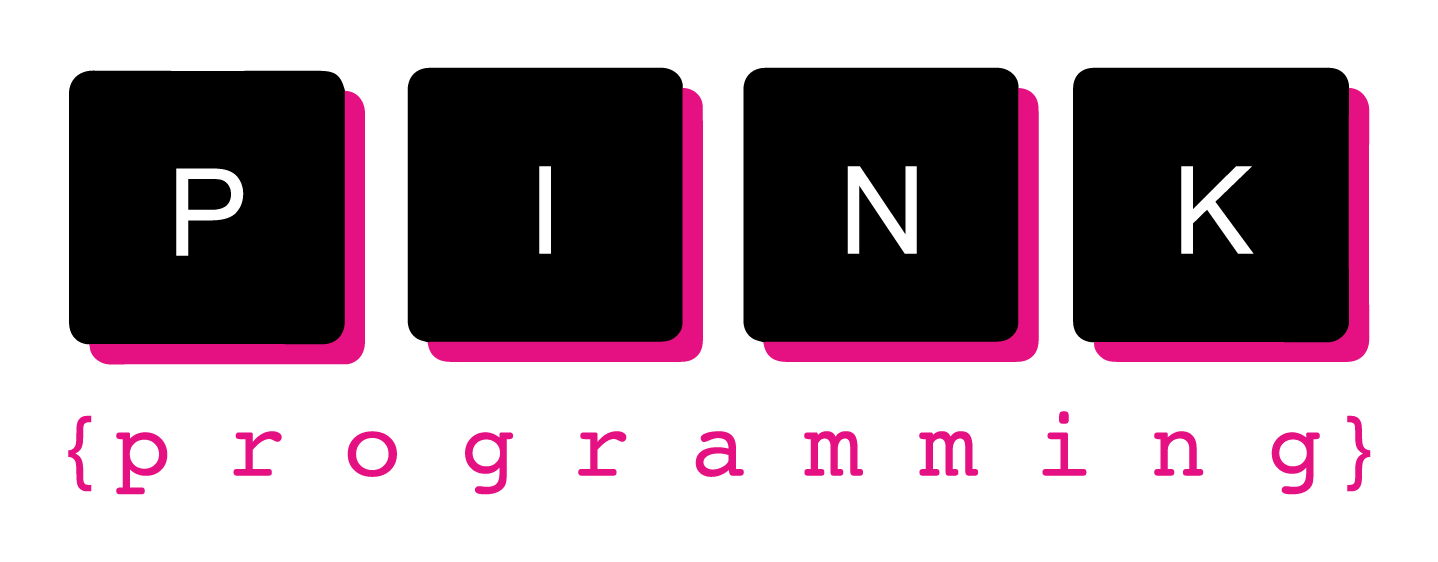
- Formation: 2015; 11 years ago
- Founder: Vanja Tufvesson; Tone Pedersen; Vibece Tengroth
- Founded at: Fyledalen
- Type: Nonprofit organization for gender equality within the IT industry
- Headquarters: Malmö
- Location: Sweden
- Chairperson of the Board: Frida Stjernholm
- Managing Director: Andrea Arvidsson
- Staff: 3
- Volunteers: 100 (2025)
- Website: https://pinkprogramming.se

Pink Programming is a Swedish non-profit organization that promotes gender equality within the tech industry, with the stated goal of attracting more women and non-binary people into IT professions by hosting women-only IT events.

Pink Programming was founded in 2015 by Vanja Tufvesson, Tone Pedersen and Vibece Tengroth as a summer camp in Fyledalen titled "Pink Programming Weekend". After its success, the concept was then expanded to Sunday events for programming in Malmö. Sigma became their first corporate sponsor in 2016, with Volvo Trucks also joining later that same year. They hosted a second camp in Äspö in 2016. By 2017, the organization had expanded to also hold events in Stockholm and Gothenburg, had plans to expand to Oslo, and were used events getting rapidly booked to capacity. By 2018, they were arranging over 25 workshops per year. By 2019, their events had attracted over 4,000 accumulated participants, and began work towards DE&I courses for companies. Tufvesson was awarded Female Founder of the Year by Dagens industri in 2019. By 2025, their cumulative attendee count was over 10,000.

Other corporate sponsors throughout the years include Axis Communications, Vattenfall, Unity, and Massive Entertainment. They also receive charitable subsidies from Malmö Municipality, Region Skåne, and the Swedish Gender Equality Agency.

Pink Programming caters to participants of any skill level, and its volunteers are all employed or studying within IT.
