= Swedish National Plant Variety Board =

The Swedish National Plant Variety Board (Swedish: Statens växtsortnämnd) was a Swedish government agency that answered to the Ministry of Agriculture, Food and Consumer Affairs. The agency handled issues related to plant breeders' rights, and was located in Solna.

The chairperson of the Board was the Swedish representative to the Council of the International Union for the Protection of New Varieties of Plants.

January 1, 2006, the Swedish National Plant Variety Board was made a part of the Swedish National Board of Agriculture and is thus no longer an independent agency.

== See also ==
- Government agencies in Sweden.
