= Swedish Agency for Economic and Regional Growth =

The Swedish Agency for Economic and Regional Growth (Swedish: Tillväxtverket) is a Swedish government agency organized under the Ministry of Enterprise, tasked to promote entrepreneurship and regional growth, and to implement structural funds programmes. The agency has broad mission. Some efforts are targeted directly to a specific company or prospective business; other times the aim is to influence and develop the business environment, often it's both. The agency has a mandate to manage and distribute funds from the European Social Fund and the European Regional Development Fund, to support projects that promote growth and jobs.

== History ==
The agency was established in 2009, when the Swedish Business Development Agency (Swedish: Verket för näringslivsutveckling, p.k.a. Nutek) and the Swedish National Rural Development Agency (Swedish: Glesbygdsverket) closed. Some work previously managed by the Swedish Consumer Agency (Swedish: Konsumentverket) was also transferred to the new agency.

== Organisation ==
The agency has about 370 employees, nine local offices and headquarters in Stockholm. It is led by Director-General Gunilla Nordlöf.

== See also ==
- Ministry of Enterprise, Energy and Communications (Sweden)
