= Aliens Appeals Board of Sweden =

Aliens Appeals Board (Swedish: Utlänningsnämnden, UN) was a Swedish government agency that answered to the Ministry for Foreign Affairs. The agency was located in Stockholm.

The Board's powers were similar to those of a court of law. It tried cases under the old Swedish Aliens Act of 1989 and the Swedish Citizenship Act. It also bore a responsibility for the development of case law in these areas. Its decisions could not be appealed, although in special cases the Board would submit an application to the Swedish Government for a decision.

The Aliens Appeals Board was discontinued and replaced by Migration Courts on 31 March 2006 when the new Aliens Act entered into force. The new rules of jurisdiction and procedure mean that individuals appealing against the decisions of the Swedish Migration Board (Migrationsverket) will be able to obtain an oral hearing in a Migration Court, in accordance with the provisions governing administrative courts. The opposite party in court proceedings will be the Swedish Migration Board.

== See also ==
- Government agencies in Sweden.
