= National Inspectorate of Strategic Products (Sweden) =

Swedish government agency

Inspectorate of Strategic Products
- Inspektionen för strategiska produkter

Agency overview
- Formed: 1 February 1996
- Preceding agency: Inspectorate for War Materiel
- Jurisdiction: Government of Sweden
- Headquarters: Stockholm
- Agency executive: Carl-Johan Wieslander, Director General
- Parent department: Ministry for Foreign Affairs
- Website: www.isp.se

Inspectorate of Strategic Products (Swedish: Inspektionen för strategiska produkter) is a Swedish government agency that answers to the Ministry for Foreign Affairs. The agency is located in Stockholm.

The agency controls the export of military equipment and dual-use products, ie products that may have both a civilian and a military use.

== See also ==
- Government agencies in Sweden
