= National Agency for Public Procurement =

- Upphandlingsmyndigheten

Agency overview
- Formed: 2015
- Jurisdiction: Government of Sweden
- Headquarters: Svetsarvägen 10, Solna
- Employees: 78 (2018)
- Minister responsible: Magdalena Andersson, Minister of Finance
- Agency executive: Inger Ek, Director-general
- Parent agency: Ministry of Finance
- Website: www.upphandlingsmyndigheten.se

The National Agency for Public Procurement (Swedish: Upphandlingsmyndigheten) is a government agency in Sweden that answers to the Ministry of Finance. The agency headquarters is located in Solna.

== See also ==
- Government agencies in Sweden
