= Swedish Seed Testing and Certification Institute =

Government agency in Sweden

The Swedish Seed Testing and Certification Institute (Swedish: Statens Utsädeskontroll) was a Swedish government agency that answered to the Ministry of Agriculture, Food and Consumer Affairs. The agency was the official authority in Sweden for controlling the quality of seeds used in agriculture. It was located in Svalöv. On January 1, 2006 it was made a part of the Swedish National Board of Agriculture and is thus no longer an independent agency.

== See also ==
- Government agencies in Sweden
