= SWEDAC =

Swedish Board for Accreditation and Conformity Assessment (Swedish: Styrelsen för ackreditering och teknisk kontroll, SWEDAC) is the national accreditation body, assessing the competence of laboratories, certification and inspection bodies in Sweden. It is also responsible for regulations and surveillance in the field of legal metrology.

It is one of the Government agencies in Sweden that answers to the Swedish Ministry for Foreign Affairs. The agency is located in Borås.
