= Swedish Agency for Government Employers =

The Swedish Agency for Government Employers (SAGE) (Swedish: Arbetsgivarverket) is a Swedish administrative authority organized under the Ministry of Finance. The agency acts like an employers' organization, responsible for central agreements and negotiations with trade unions on pay and employment conditions for approximately 250,000 employees in the government sector, like the overall pay structures and salary increases. SAGE is also responsible for the development and follow-up of employer policies in the government sector. SAGE is funded by membership fees collected from its 250 member agencies, which are based on the payroll expenditures of each member agency. The agency is led by a 15-member board (Swedish: arbetsgivarkollegium), appointed by the 250 heads of the member agencies, which in turn appoint a Director-General responsible for the daily operations of SAGE. The board is responsible for pay negotiations with the trade unions. SAGE was officially established in 1994, but similar organisations have existed under various names since 1965. It is led by Director-General Ulf Bengtsson.

== History ==
The agency was formed in the middle of the 1960s, as the National Swedish Collective Bargaining Office (Swedish: Statens avtalsverk). In 1979, the agency changed its name to National Swedish Agency for Government Employers (Swedish: Statens arbetsgivarverk). In 1994, it was reorganized into the Swedish Agency for Government Employers (Swedish: Arbetsgivarverket), which was organized as an administrative authority and a member organization.

== See also ==
- Ministry of Health and Social Affairs (Sweden)
