= Swedish International Development Cooperation Agency =

Swedish aid agency

- Styrelsen för internationellt utvecklingssamarbete

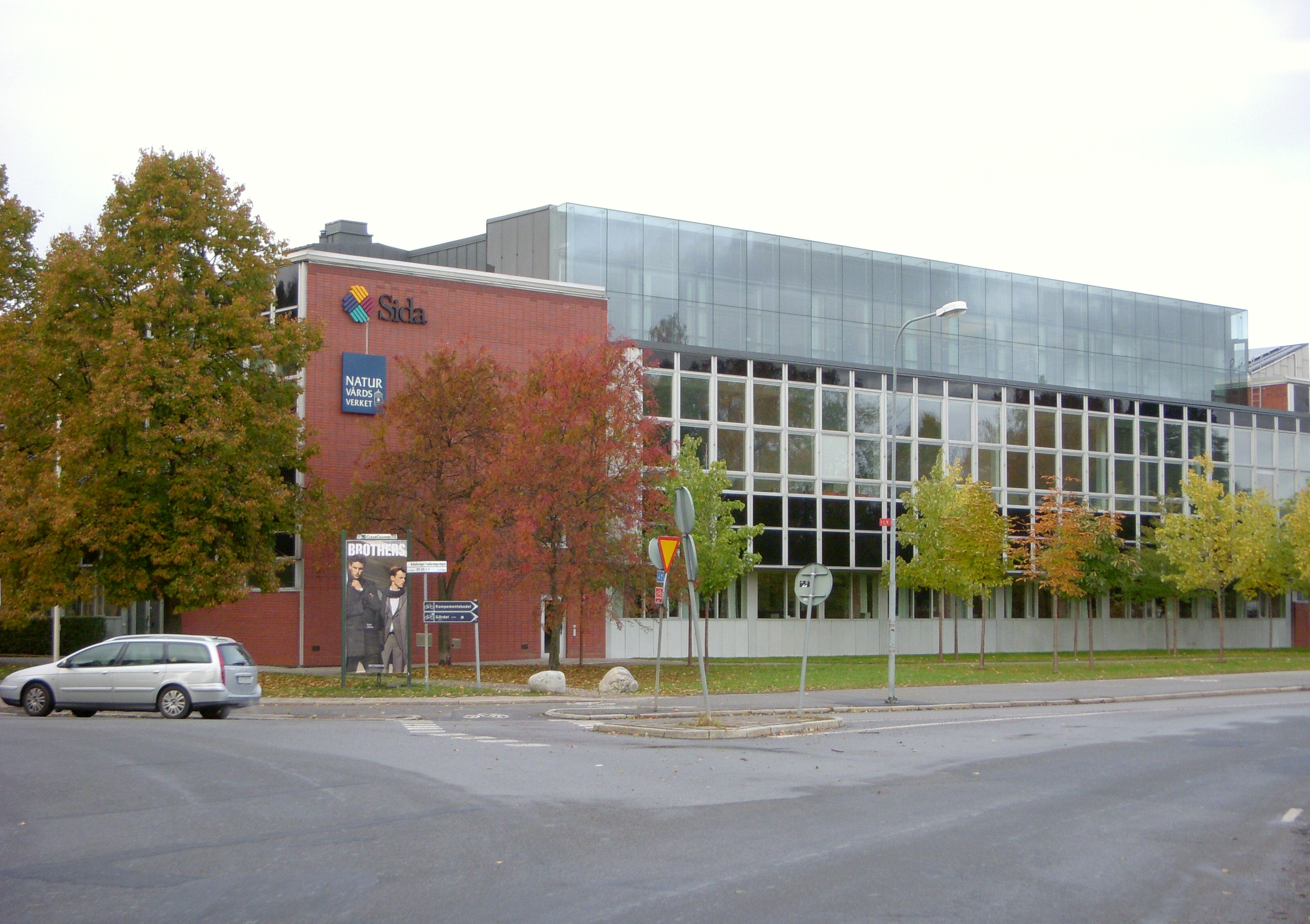
- Earlier main office on Valhallavägen in Stockholm.

Agency overview
- Formed: 1995
- Headquarters: Sundbyberg, Sweden
- Employees: about 900
- Parent department: Ministry for Foreign Affairs
- Website: www.sida.se

The Swedish International Development Cooperation Agency (Swedish: Styrelsen för internationellt utvecklingssamarbete, Sida) is a government agency of the Swedish Ministry for Foreign Affairs. Sida is responsible for organization of the bulk of Sweden's official development assistance to developing countries. According to the OECD, 2024 official development assistance from Sweden decreased to US$5 billion, representing 0.79% of their gross national income (GNI).

Sida is informed by the Yogyakarta Principles in Action the working for the rights for LGBTI and Swedish government mandated an "Action plan for Sida's work on sexual orientation and gender identity in international development cooperation 2007–2009". As well as directly funding a number of LGBTI groups, Sida has actively promoted LGBTI issues in its networking with other donors and international stakeholders.

== Research cooperation ==
A long-term development cooperation supported by Sida is its research cooperation, which aims at strengthening research in and by low-income countries, to reduce poverty and build sustainable societies. The budget was close to 1000 million SEK 2020.

== Annual budget ==
In 2024, Sida's annual budget was 26.5 billion SEK, similar to previous years. Sida has received criticism for being unable to manage the large amounts.

== Corruption issues ==
Sida has been embroiled in many corruption cases and typically discovers hundreds of suspected such cases every year.

== Criticism ==
Sida has received widespread criticism for:

- financial support to corruption-prone projects
- inefficient corruption prevention
- unsubstantiated financial decisions and lack of financial control
- weak results
- diffuse priorities and decisionmaking
- rampant conflict of interest
- sub-standard planning and coordination
- inefficient use of resources

In 2023, SIDA won a satyrical tax-wastefullness prize for long-lasting financial support to an organization that participated to the terrorist attack against Israel.
