= Swedish Enforcement Authority =

Government agency in Sweden

- Kronofogdemyndigheten (Swedish)

Agency overview
- Formed: 1 July 2006
- Jurisdiction: Government of Sweden
- Headquarters: Sundbyberg Municipality
- Minister responsible: Elisabeth Svantesson, Minister for Finance
- Agency executives: Fredrik Rosengren, Chief Enforcement Director; Cecilia Hegethorn Mogensen, Deputy Chief Enforcement Director
- Parent agency: Ministry of Finance
- Key document: SFS 2007:781
- Website: kronofogden.se
- Agency ID: 202100-5646

The Swedish Enforcement Authority (Swedish: Kronofogdemyndigheten, lit. 'the crown bailiff authority'; abbreviated as KFM; colloquially known as Kronofogden) is the government agency in Sweden responsible of debt collection, distraint, evictions, and enforcement of court orders. The authority also supervise trustees in bankruptcy.

== Authority ==
The Enforcement Authority is the only organization in Sweden empowered to withdraw money from bank accounts of debtors and, if necessary, visit the homes and companies of debtors to seize (distrain) property. The authority also has the right to withhold money directly from a debtor's income (wage garnishment). It collect debts for individuals and businesses as well as for the government.

== Payment order ==
A person or organization whose debtor refuses to pay an outstanding debt can submit a claim (payment order) to the Authority. The respondent is served the claim, and has to respond within a certain time. If there is no response and if there is proof that the claim has been served the recipient, the Authority is empowered to announce an enforceable verdict, which can be used for foreclosure. If the respondent disputes a debt claim, the claim must be tried by a court in a civil lawsuit. The payment order system is therefore a fast track to get an enforceable verdict in cases where the legal claim is not disputed, and in other cases an alternative to subpoena.

== See also ==
- Swedish government agencies
