= Ministry of Finance (Sweden) =

Government ministry of Sweden

Coordinates: 59°19′48.76″N 18°03′53.75″E

- Finansdepartementet

Agency overview
- Formed: 1840
- Employees: 554 (2024)
- Annual budget: SEK 694 million
- Ministers responsible: Elisabeth Svantesson, Head of the Ministry; Minister for Finance; Niklas Wykman, Minister for Financial Markets; Erik Slottner, Minister for Public Administration
- Parent agency: Government Offices (Note: Before 1 January 1975, the Government Offices was called the Royal Chancery.)
- Website: www.government.se

The Ministry of Finance (Swedish: Finansdepartementet) is a Swedish government ministry responsible for matters relating to economic policy, the central government budget, taxes, banking, security and insurance, international economic work, central, regional and local government.

The ministry has a staff of 490, of whom only 20 are political appointees. The political executive is made up of three ministers: the Minister for Finance – currently Elisabeth Svantesson (m), the Minister for Financial Markets – currently Niklas Wykman (m) and the Minister for Public Administration – currently Erik Slottner (kd).

The ministry offices are located at Drottninggatan 21 in central Stockholm.

== Government agencies ==
The Ministry of Finance is principal for the following government agencies:

- Legal, Financial and Administrative Services Agency (Kammarkollegiet)
- Institute of Economic Research (Konjunkturinstitutet)
- Fiscal Policy Council (Finanspolitiska rådet)
- Financial Management Authority (Ekonomistyrningsverket)
- Tax Agency (Skatteverket)
- Enforcement Authority (Kronofogdemyndigheten)
- Customs Service (Tullverket)
- Financial Supervisory Authority (Finansinspektionen)
- National Debt Office (Riksgäldskontoret)
- County administrative boards (Länsstyrelserna)
- Statistics Sweden or (Statistiska Centralbyrån)
- National Property Board (Statens fastighetsverk)
- Fortifications Agency (Fortifikationsverket)
- Consumer Agency (Konsumentverket)
- Gambling Authority (Spelinspektionen)
- Lantmäteriet
- National Board of Housing, Building and Planning (Boverket)
- National Government Service Pension and Group Life Insurance Board (Statens tjänstepensions- och grupplivnämnd)
- Special Board for the Public Sector (Offentliga sektorns särskilda nämnd)
- Agency for Government Employers (Arbetsgivarverket)
- Agency for Public Management (Statskontoret)
- Government Service Centre (Statens servicecenter)
- Government Employee Pensions Board (Statens tjänstepensionsverk)
- National Board of Appeal (Statens överklagandenämnd)
- Government Disciplinary Board for Higher Officials (Statens ansvarsnämnd)
- Arbitration Tribunal for Occupational Injury Compensation (Skiljenämnden i vissa trygghetsfrågor)
- Accounting Standards Board (Bokföringsnämnden)
- Estate Agents Inspectorate (Fastighetsmäklarinspektionen)
- Board for Consumer Disputes (Allmänna reklamationsnämnden)
- The National Agency for Public Procurement (Upphandlingsmyndigheten)

== Areas of responsibility ==
- Financial markets
- Central government budget
- International cooperation
- Local authorities
- Taxes

== See also ==
- Ministry of the Budget
- Ministry of Economics
