= Consumer Agency (Sweden) =

Swedish government consumer rights agency

Swedish Consumer Agency (Swedish: Konsumentverket)

The Swedish Consumer Agency (Swedish: Konsumentverket) is a Swedish government agency that answers to the Ministry of Finance. Its director general, Lena Aronsson (since 2025), is also designated Consumer ombudsman (Konsumentombudsmannen, KO).

The agency, with a staff of around 120 located in Karlstad, provides the Swedish general public with consumer affairs assistance, acting in the collective interest of consumers. It is active in the fields of advertising and contract terms, consumer information and product safety. The task of resolving individual consumer disputes is handled by the National Board for Consumer Complaints, but the Consumer Ombudsman sometimes files suits against companies whose business practices are believed to violate Swedish consumer laws.

== See also ==
- Government agencies in Sweden.
