= National Board of Fisheries (Sweden) =

Swedish administrative authority

Swedish National Board of Fisheries (Swedish: Fiskeriverket) was a Swedish government agency within the Ministry of Rural Affairs. It was located in Gothenburg and was the central government authority for fisheries in Sweden. It was established in 1948. It ceased to exist on 1 July 2011.

== See also ==
- Government agencies in Sweden.
