= National Board for Consumer Complaints (Sweden) =

The National Board for Consumer Disputes (Swedish: Allmänna reklamationsnämnden, ARN) is a Swedish government agency that answers to the Ministry of Finance. The agency is headquartered in Stockholm. Its main task is to issue non-binding recommendations on the resolution of disputes between consumers and business operators, based on what a court trial is assumed to result in. A person can file complaints against a company. If the company does not follow the recommendation from ARN, ARN will publish this to media, and the consumer has the possibility to take the matter to court.

== See also ==
- Government agencies in Sweden
