= Swedish Veterinary Agency =

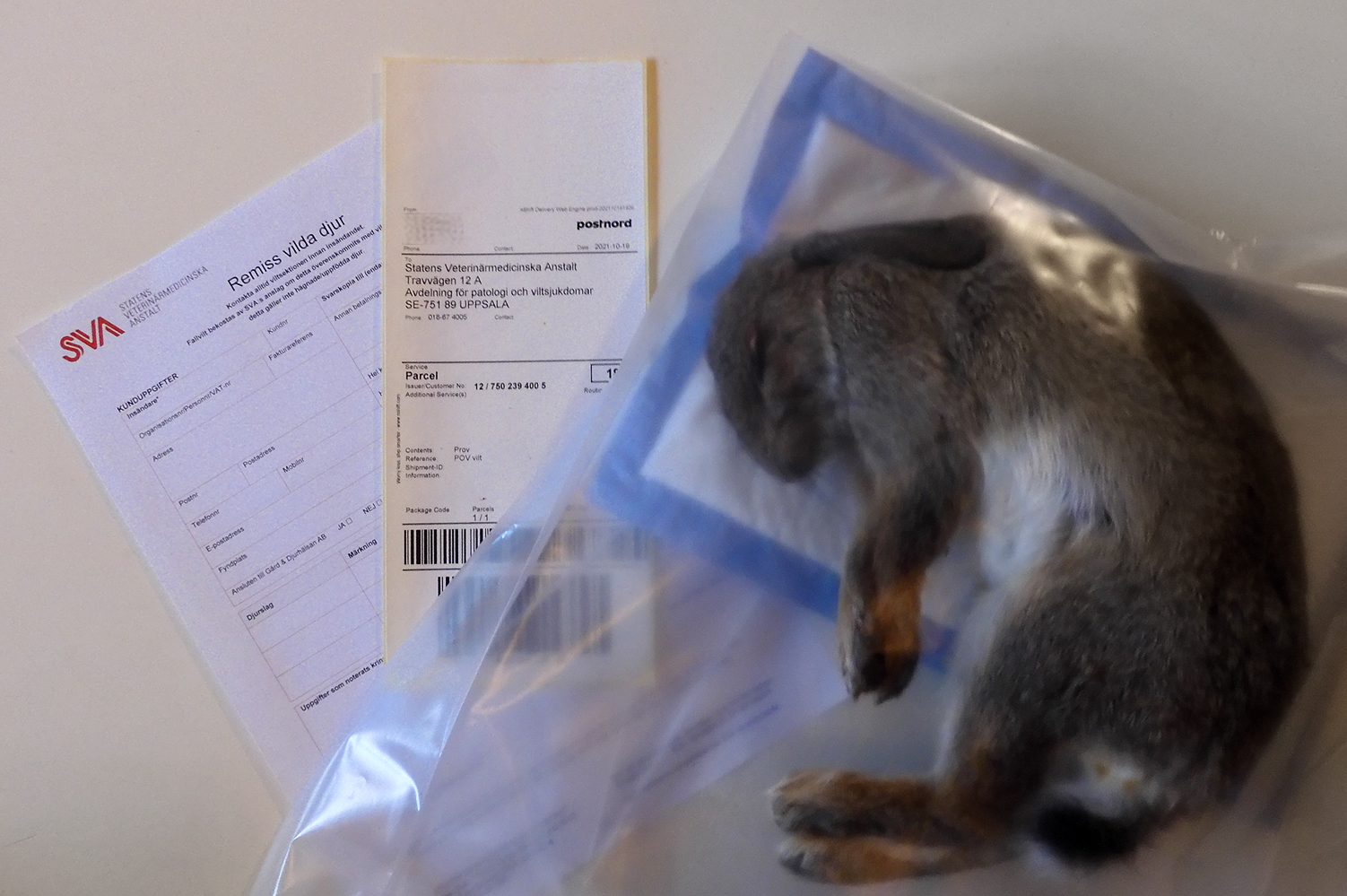
Frozen rabbit ready to be sent to the Swedish Veterinary Agency.

The Swedish Veterinary Agency (Swedish: Statens veterinärmedicinska anstalt, SVA) is a Swedish government agency that answers to the Ministry of Rural Affairs and Infrastructure. The agency was established in 1911 and is located in Uppsala.

The agency is an expert organisation for veterinary medicine, aiming to promote animal health by preventing, diagnosing and controlling infectious diseases in animals. It is specialised in virology, bacteriology, antibiotic resistance, parasitology, chemistry, feed safety, vaccinology, pathology and epidemiology. It provides advice and conducts commissioned investigations and programmes for controlling contagious diseases. One of the main commissions is zoonotic infections.

== See also ==
- Government agencies in Sweden
