= Emma Formas de Dávila =

Chilean artist

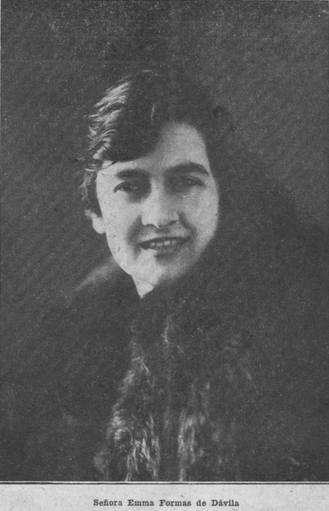
- Formas de Dávila in 1921
- Born: Emma Formas Domínguez c. 1876; Santiago, Chile
- Died: 17 March 1961; Santiago, Chile
- Education: Academy of Painting
- Occupations: Painter; sculptor
- Spouse: Ricardo Dávila Silva (m. 1900; died 1960)

Emma Formas de Dávila (née Formas Domínguez; c. 1876 – 17 March 1961) was a Chilean painter and sculptor. In 1920, Formas received the first prize medal at the Official Fine Arts Salon (Spanish: Salón Oficial de Bellas Artes).

== Early life and education ==
Formas was born around 1876 (Note: Also cited as 1886.) in Santiago to Adolfo Formas and Sabina Dominguez. Formas was educated at Colegio de los Sagrados Corazones de Santiago.

In 1898, Formas exhibited at the Official Fine Arts Salon as a student of Alberto Valenzuela Llanos, from which she received an honorable mention. In 1910, Formas enrolled at the Academy of Painting where she studied under Fernando Álvarez de Sotomayor y Zaragoza.

== Career ==
The same year Formas exhibited at Official Fine Arts Salon where she was awarded third prize medal. Formas received the second prize medal in 1915, with an honorable mention for sculpture. Formas won the portrait prize at the Edwards competition in 1919, and the first prize medal at the Official Fine Arts Salon in 1920.

In 1921, Formas held her first and only solo show at the Rivas Calvo Gallery in Santiago where she exhibited female nudes, children's portraits and a portrait of Alberto Valenzuela Llanos. In either 1923 or early 1924, traveled to Europe and later settled in Paris. Formas appears to have returned to Chile by 1929, as she participated in the Official Fine Arts Salon. Formas is known to have exhibited twice more during her life, in group shows in 1930 and 1949, both at the Chilean National Museum of Fine Arts.

== Personal life ==
On 24 June 1900, Formas married Ricardo Dávila Silva (1876–1960), a writer and lawyer.

Formas died on 17 March 1961 (Note: Also cited as 1959.) in Santiago.
