= Swedish Gender Equality Agency =

Swedish government agency

The Swedish Gender Equality Agency (Swedish: Jämställdhetsmyndigheten) is a Swedish government agency located in Angered, Gothenburg. It has about 50 employees and was formed in January 2018. The agency's responsibilities include gender equality in public administration (Swedish: offentlig förvaltning), other public financed activity and the civil society within the private sector. Lise Tamm is the current general director since 2024.

In November 2018, an internal employee health report concluded that bullying and harassment occurred at the agency. According to its findings, 70% of the staff were at risk of occupational burnout.

== History ==
The decision to establish the agency was taken by parliament in 2017 and October 26th the same year Lena Ag was appointed as the first director general of the agency by Stefan Löfvens parliament. The official date for the establishment of the agency was 1 January 2018. In the autumn of 2018 the agency was discontinued due to budget cuts by the Christian Democrats and Moderate Party. This decision was later changed, and the agency was restored by the coalition of the Swedish Social Democratic Party, Center Party, The Green Party and The Liberal Party of Sweden.

== Work ==
Today the Swedish Gender Equality Agency has roughly 60 employees working within five different departments. These include administration, analysis and monitoring, support and coordinator, national strategy to counteract men’s violence against women, and communication.

The overall goal of Sweden’s national gender equality work is for women and men to have the same ability/power to shape their lives as well as in society. This work is divided into different areas; influence, economy, health, education, work and bodily integrity. Amongst other areas this work takes place in the agency’s work against men’s violence against women. Which includes physical, psychological and sexual violence.

The agency is leading several different projects, including the operative network NMT which stands for National Method Support Team (Nationelly metodstödsteam). The network is working against prostitution and human trafficking. In doing this they are helping the European Public Prosecutor’s Office, the Social Service and the police amongst others to help work together with inputs aiming to work against prostitution and human trafficking.

== See also ==
- Swedish Ministry of Integration and Gender Equality, a former agency disbanded in 2010.
