= Veterinary Disciplinary Board (Sweden) =

Swedish government agency

The Swedish Veterinary Disciplinary Board (Swedish: Veterinära ansvarsnämnden) was a Swedish government agency that answered to the Ministry of Agriculture, Food and Consumer Affairs. The agency tried cases of professional misconduct among veterinarians. It was located in Jönköping.

== See also ==
- Government agencies in Sweden.
