= Ministry for Foreign Affairs (Sweden) =

Government ministry of Sweden

- Utrikesdepartementet
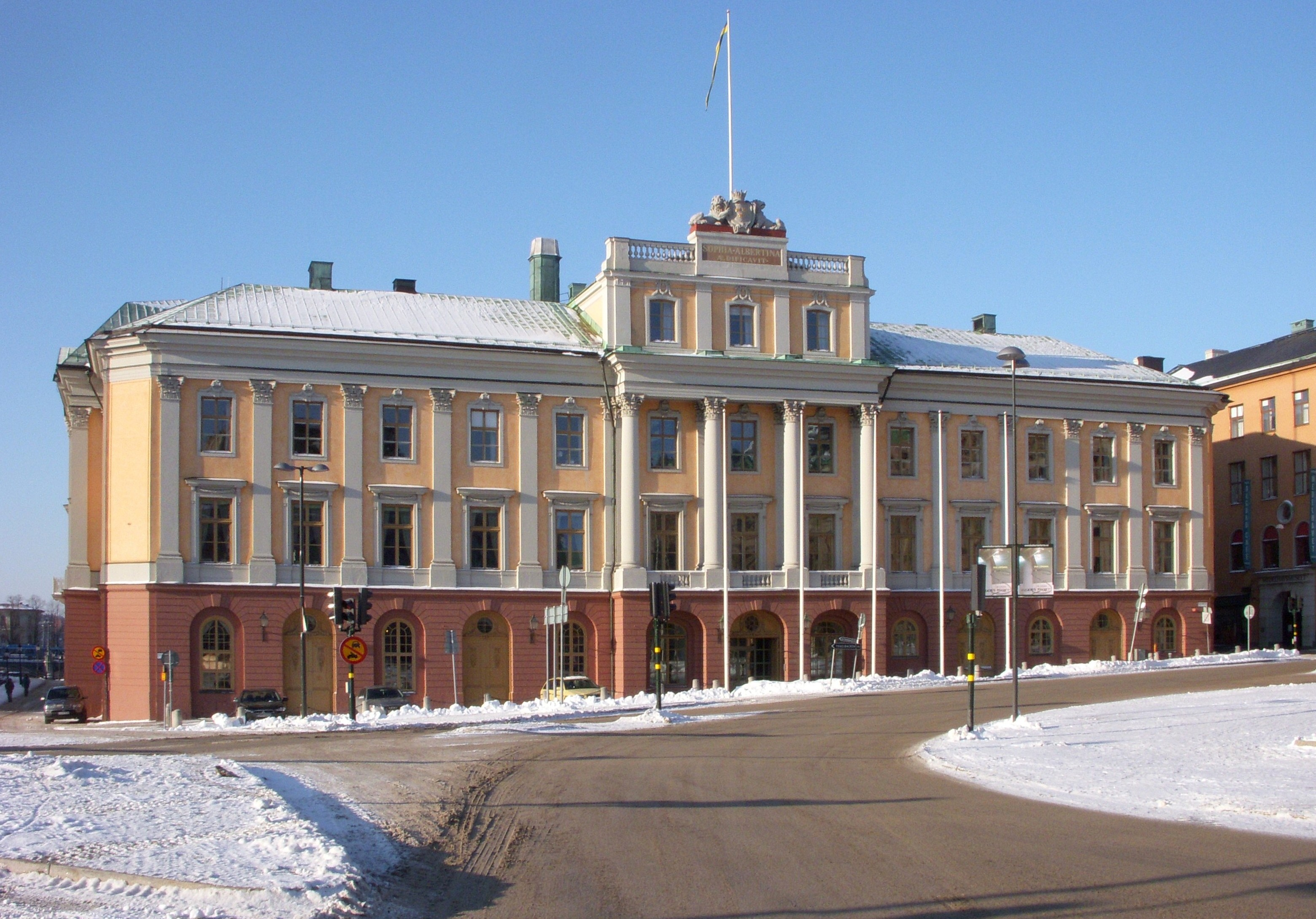
- Arvfurstens palats, the seat of the Ministry of Foreign Affairs, at Gustav Adolfs torg in Stockholm.

Agency overview
- Formed: 1791
- Employees: 1,284 (2024)
- Annual budget: SEK 3.342 billion (2025)
- Ministers responsible: Maria Malmer Stenergard, Head of the Ministry Minister for Foreign Affairs; Benjamin Dousa, Minister for International Development Cooperation and for Foreign Trade
- Parent agency: Government Offices (Note: Before 1 January 1975, the Government Offices was called the Royal Chancery.)
- Website: English-language website

The Ministry for Foreign Affairs (Swedish: Utrikesdepartementet, UD) is a ministry in the Government of Sweden responsible for policies related to foreign policy, democracy, human rights, international development cooperation and foreign trade.

The ministry is currently headed by the minister for foreign affairs, Maria Malmer Stenergard of the Moderate Party.

== History ==
The Ministry of Foreign Affairs was added in 1791, when Gustav III established the King's Cabinet for Foreign Correspondence. The organization that was formally named the Ministry of Foreign Affairs in 1840 was then created in practice.

It is possible to speak of a foreign administration to the function as soon as we can discern a Swedish central state administration, and from the end of the 13th century. Under Gustav Vasa, the chancellery developed into the body that handled and expedited government matters. With Gustav II Adolf's reforms in the 1620s, a specialization was carried out within the chancellery so that foreign affairs were distributed among secretaries according to country.

The head of the chancellery was the chancellor. In a way, he can be described as foreign minister. More famous holders of this position are Axel Oxenstierna and Magnus Gabriel De la Gardie. The title was changed during Charles XI's time to Chancellery President.

During the period of freedom, the chancellery was divided into various expeditions, including a foreign expedition. These can be seen as predecessors to the ministries. The head of each expedition was a state secretary. The Chancellery President was the head of the Chancellery. During the period of freedom, his power was further strengthened. One of the famous holders of the post was Arvid Horn.

== Government agencies and other bodies ==
The Ministry of Foreign Affairs is principal for 10 government agencies. The ministry is also responsible for Sweden's diplomatic missions around the world.

- Legations and embassies in foreign countries
- Export Credits Guarantee Board (Exportkreditnämnden)
- Folke Bernadotte Academy (Folke Bernadotteakademin
- Inspectorate of Strategic Products (Inspektionen för strategiska produkter)
- Board of Trade (Kommerskollegium)
- Nordic Africa Institute (Nordiska Afrikainstitutet)
- SWEDAC (Styrelsen för ackreditering och teknisk kontroll)
- Sida (Styrelsen för internationellt utvecklingssamarbete)
- Swedish Institute (Svenska institutet)
- Swedish Institute Alexandria (Svenska institutet i Alexandria)
- Business Sweden (Sveriges export- och investeringsråd).

== Areas of responsibility ==
- Democracy and human rights
- Foreign and security policy
- International development cooperation
- International law
- Trade and promotion of Sweden

== Cabinet ministers ==
=== Ministers for foreign affairs ===
For a full list of ministers for foreign affairs, see Minister for Foreign Affairs (Sweden).

=== Ministers for international development cooperation ===
For a full list of ministers for international development cooperation, see Minister for International Development Cooperation (Sweden).

=== Ministers for foreign trade ===
For a full list of ministers for foreign trade, see Minister for Foreign Trade (Sweden).
