= Swedish Radiation Safety Authority =

Nuclear safety regulatory body in Sweden

The Swedish Radiation Safety Authority (Swedish: Strålsäkerhetsmyndigheten) is the Swedish government authority responsible for radiation protection. It sorts under the Ministry of the Environment.

It was created on 1 July 2008 with the merging of the Swedish Nuclear Power Inspectorate and the Swedish Radiation Protection Authority. It employs 300 people and is located in Stockholm, with an annual budget of about 400 million Swedish krona.

Its Director-General is Nina Cromnier.

On the first of March 2022, the Swedish Radiation Safety Authority increased their readiness to handle an "radiological emergency" in the wake of Russian invasion of Ukraine.
