= José Manuel Ortúzar Formas =

Chilean politician (1796–1848)

Senator, Republic of Chile
- In office 1831–1840
- Preceded by: Gaspar Marín Esquivel
- Succeeded by: Ramón Subercaseaux Mercado
- Constituency: Coquimbo

Senator, Republic of Chile
- In office 1840–1846
- Preceded by: Juan José Manzano y Bustamante
- Succeeded by: Francisco Javier Ovalle Bezanilla
- Constituency: Ñuble

Senator, Republic of Chile
- In office 1846–1849
- Preceded by: José Miguel Irarrázaval Alcalde
- Succeeded by: Bernardo del Solar Marín
- Constituency: Santiago

Personal details
- Born: 1796 Santiago de Chile, Viceroyalty of Peru
- Died: 1848 (aged 51–52) Santiago de Chile, Chile
- Resting place: Vicuña
- Citizenship: Chilean
- Party: Liberal Party of Chile
- Spouse: Dolores Ramírez y Fernández Garzón
- Occupation: Lawyer

José Manuel Ortúzar Formas (1796–1848) was a Chilean lawyer and politician. He was born in Santiago in 1796. He died in the same city, in March 1848. He was the son of José Manuel Ortúzar e Ibanez de Ovalle and Maria del Carmen Formas Patiño. He married Dolores Ramírez y Fernández Garzón.

== Education and career ==
Ortúzar was educated at the National Institute and obtained his law degree in 1819. After the abdication of Bernardo O'Higgins, he joined with General Ramón Freire's pipiolas forces and went to the campaigns in Chiloé alongside the Chilean military. On his return he was honorably discharged from the army and went to the civilian world, working as a lawyer. During the Civil War of 1830, he was not with the pipiolo side. Subsequently, he joined the Liberal Party, for which he was elected Senator for the province of Coquimbo (1831-1840), of Ñuble (1840-1843) and Santiago (1843-1849). In these periods he joined the Standing Committee on Government and Foreign Affairs.
