= Swedish Institute Alexandria =

The Swedish Institute Alexandria (Swedish: Svenska institutet i Alexandria) was established in Alexandria, Egypt, in 1999, according to an agreement between the governments of Sweden and Egypt.

The institute was located in a building on the Corniche by the Eastern Harbour, which since 1925 has served as the Swedish Consulate and later also as a Seamen's Institute. It is an autonomous part of Sweden's Ministry for Foreign Affairs. Its Board and Advisory Committee are appointed by the Swedish government.

The creation of the institute was initiated in 1997 as part of an ongoing effort of Sweden in co-operation with countries of the South.

The Swedish Institute in Alexandria closed on 18 March 2019 and is now temporarily based in Stockholm. The institute is planned to relocate at a later time it to a new place in the Middle East or North Africa region.

== See also ==
- Swedish Institute
