= Swedish Gambling Authority =

Swedish government agency

- The logotype of Spelinspektionen

Gaming Commission overview
- Jurisdiction: Sweden
- Headquarters: Finningevägen 54 B Strängnäs
- Employees: 75
- Website: Authority website

Map

Swedish Gambling Authority (Swedish: Spelinspektionen, previously, Swedish: Lotteriinspektionen) is a state-owned gambling regulator in Sweden. The Authority is Sweden's state administrative body for gambling and lotteries, which regulates the Swedish gambling and gaming markets.

== Activity ==
The Authority a supervisory state body operating under the Swedish Gaming Act (2018: 1138), the Gaming Machines Act (1982: 636) and the Casino Act (1999: 355). The authority also monitors developments in the gambling and lottery market and advises the government on casinos. The Swedish Gambling Authority also issues permits for lotteries and examines the approval of various lotteries and games.

Since 2020, the Authority has been cooperating with its Dutch counterparts, the Kansspelautoriteit. A memorandum of understanding was signed to strengthen cooperation.

From January 1, 2021, new rules for the regulation of gambling are in effect in Sweden, in particular, Esports are being regulated. The rules prohibit placing bets on rules violations in sports matches (for example, yellow and red cards in football), as well as on individual results of players under the age of 18. The rules do not prohibit betting on double matches (i.e. tennis) if one of the members of the doubles team is older than 18 years. If the majority of players (three out of four) in a doubles match are under the age of 18, all bets will be void. The same rules apply to Esports.

In December 2020, the inspectorate fined ATG and Spooniker customers for depositing amounts that exceeded the limits of 5,000 kroner each week during the pandemic but later Spooniker won an appeal against the regulator. The Swedish Gambling Market Commission conducted a market study, suggesting that the inspectorate strengthen market regulation. In particular, it was proposed to ban gambling advertising from 6:00 a.m. to 9:00 p.m. and to approve a deposit limit of 5,000 kroner on a permanent basis.

== Organization ==
On 1 January 2019, the authority was renamed from "Swedish Lottery Inspectorate" to the "Swedish Gaming Inspectorate" in accordance with a 2018 Riksdag decision.

The gaming inspection is headed by the council, as of 2023, the minister responsible for the gambling market is Niklas Wykman, a Minister for Financial Markets.
