= Swedish Board of Agriculture =

Swedish government agency

- Statens jordbruksverk

Agency overview
- Formed: 1991
- Jurisdiction: Government of Sweden
- Headquarters: Vallgatan 8, Jönköping; 57°46′46.88″N 14°9′54.13″E
- Employees: About 1,180 (2008)
- Annual budget: SEK 415,988,000 (2008)
- Minister responsible: Eskil Erlandsson, Minister for Agriculture
- Agency executives: Mats Persson, Director-general; Christina Huhtasaari, Deputy Director-general
- Parent agency: Ministry of Agriculture
- Website: www.sjv.se

The Swedish Board of Agriculture (Swedish: Statens jordbruksverk, commonly known as Jordbruksverket) is a Government agency in Sweden that answers to the Ministry of Agriculture. The agency headquarters is located in Jönköping.

It is responsible for agriculture, horticulture and reindeer husbandry, and functions as the Swedish government's expert authority in the field of agricultural and food policy.

== See also ==
- Government agencies in Sweden
