= History of Sweden (1991–present) =

After a period of rapid growth and unprecedented economic prosperity during the late 1980s, by 1990 the Swedish economy overheated, and after a controversial bill freezing salaries and banning strikes failed in the Riksdag, the social democratic government led by Prime Minister Ingvar Carlsson resigned in February 1990. At this time the respected Finance Minister Kjell-Olof Feldt left the government in protest over what he saw as irresponsible economic policies. Carlsson soon formed a new government, but by the time of the general election in September 1991 the economy was in free fall, and with rapidly rising unemployment, the social democrats received the smallest share of votes in sixty years (37.7%), resulting in the loss of office to the opposition, a centre-right coalition led by Carl Bildt.

Göran Persson of the Social Democrats became Prime Minister in 1996, a post he would retain until after the 2006 elections which would allow for the return of the centre-right coalition parties to government as part of the Alliance.

The 2000s and 2010s, saw the Social Democratic party's further loss of influence, though it would return to government in 2014 under Stefan Löfven. The 2010s were politically turbulent; the European migration crisis saw the rapid rise of the right-wing populist Sweden Democrats, who would eventually become the balancing power between the two main blocs of left and right which had long been the dominant dynamic within Swedish politics. Opposition toward the Sweden Democrats from the traditional political parties caused lengthy government formation processes, especially following the 2018 general election.

== The Bildt Era ==
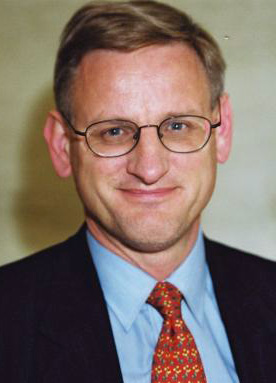
Carl Bildt, Prime Minister of Sweden between 1991-94

In response to the perceived failure of the Social Democrats to handle the economy and in protest over what was seen as outdated socialist policies (state-run monopolies in for example television, radio, telephone services & hospital care), newly formed reformist-populist party Ny demokrati made a successful surprise push for the Riksdag in the 1991 elections, enabling a new centre-right government to be formed. Under the leadership of Carl Bildt, the new government was determined to profile itself as anti-socialist and cosmopolitan, with the aim of initiating many reforms. Blaming some of the excesses of the Nordic model for the economic crisis, it wanted to initiate reforms and started dismantling of state-run monopolies, lowering of taxes, reshaping and internationalization of higher education, and laid the foundation for Sweden's subsequent entry into the European Union.

However, the new government had inherited the most serious economic crisis seen in fifty years, which meant that instead of focusing on reforms, it had to spend almost its entire period in office (1991–1994) in crisis management mode. Consumer prices went up, house prices down and unemployment rocketed. In late 1992, under the pressure of a flurry of financial speculation that shook several European currencies at this time, the Riksbank briefly raised its target rate to 500% in an effort to defend the fixed exchange rate of the Swedish krona, but it had to be set free against other currencies, and immediately dropped about 15% against the US Dollar. During 1991 and 1992, the housing bubble that had built up during the 1980s deflated, leaving many banks nearly insolvent, leading to the Swedish banking rescue, where the government had to guarantee all deposits in the nation's 114 banks and some nationalized at a cost of 64 billion SEK.

The drain on the state treasury from 1992 and onward, was overwhelming and the current account deficit and national debt surged. To solve this, bipartisan agreements were soon reached with the Social Democrats on measures to combat the crisis, but with even these agreements, the hard conditions and deep economic recession were to last throughout the 1990s. Because of this, the Bildt Cabinet is by many regarded as largely a failure, not only because the recession meant it was unable to do the reforms it set out to do, disenfranchising its core voters, but also because it wasn't seen as handling the crisis effectively, while making some obvious mistakes (such as the costly defence of the krona), sending swing voters into the arms of the opposition.

While the lasting policy impact was limited, with notable exceptions such as the introduction of commercial TV/Radio and school vouchers, the most profound impact of the Bildt era was that most people came to associate a non-Social Democrat run country with recession and general misery (a picture also skilfully painted in the next three general elections by the Social Democrats), thereby effectively locking out the center-right parties from cabinet positions for the next twelve years. In recent years however, the Bildt government reputation has been restored to some degree, not least through the international praise given for the model way it handled the bank bailouts.

== The Persson Era ==
The 1994 elections restored Ingvar Carlsson's Social democratic minority government. During the interregnum after the election, the car and passenger ferry MS Estonia was lost in the Baltic Sea on 28 September, killing 852 people, most of them Swedish (501 out of 852 victims), in one of the worst maritime disasters in modern history. One of the few positive events during the time was Sweden's surprise run at the 1994 FIFA World Cup, which earned Team Sweden a bronze medal. Göran Persson was appointed finance minister and saddled with the difficult task of balancing the budget by aggressively cutting social programs and benefits, something most Swedes initially intensely resented, but an achievement for which he eventually came to be respected. After Carlsson's retirement in 1996, Persson replaced him, and remained in power until he lost the 2006 elections, ending 12 years of Social Democrat rule.

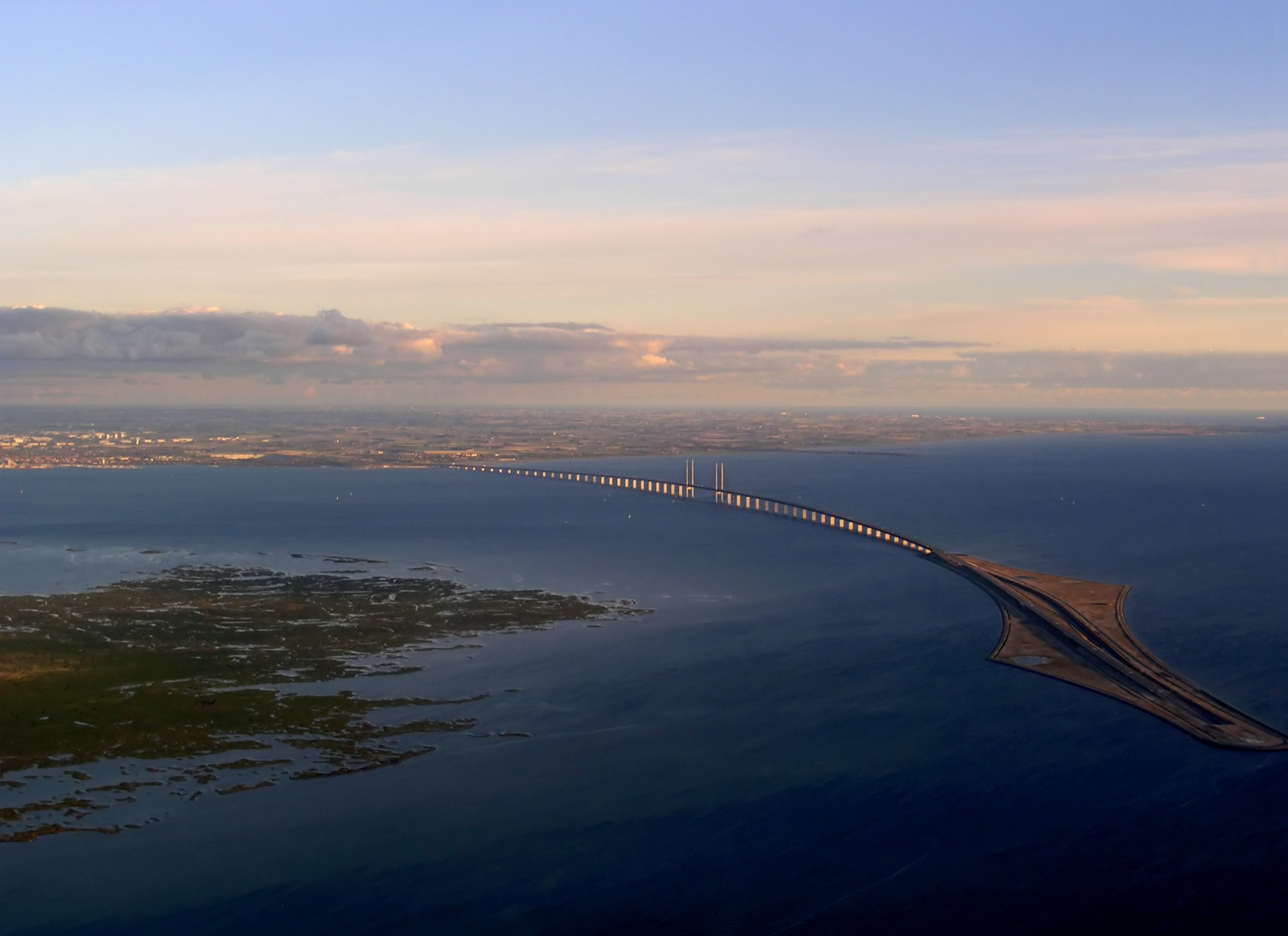
The Öresund Bridge, completed in 2000.

Sweden entered the European Union in 1995 after a consultative referendum the previous year. The entry into the EU in some ways turned a page in Swedish history and could be seen as signifying the end of Swedish exceptionality and neutrality. Twentieth century Sweden often took an insular view and kept Europe and what was going on "on the continent" at an arm's length. EU membership challenged this, but a majority of the electorate was still eurosceptic, and it is unlikely that a referendum at any other time but in conjunction with a very severe recession would have yielded a positive result. The Öresund Bridge between Malmö and Copenhagen, Denmark, opened in 2000, is sometimes seen as a symbol of Sweden's stronger ties to continental Europe.

During the late 1990s, the Swedish Armed Forces were severely downsized, with enlistment decreasing to 20% of all young men (from 90% at the height of the cold war), but remained present in UN peacekeeping forces, not least the Yugoslav wars, where former prime minister Carl Bildt was envoy for the EU, and later the UN.

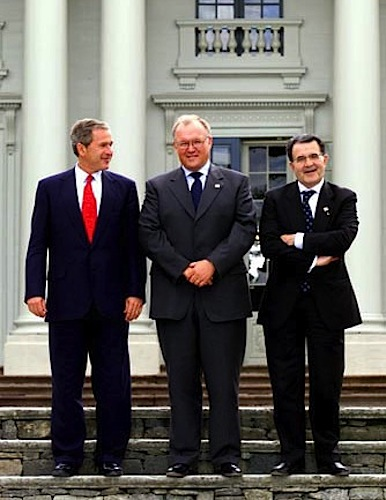
U.S. President George W. Bush poses with Swedish Prime Minister Göran Persson and European Commission President Romano Prodi at Gunnebo House near Gothenburg, on 14 June 2001.

In the first half of 2001, Sweden held the rotating EU Presidency, and hosted a series of high-profile meetings and workshops, culminating in June with a summit in Gothenburg visited by George W. Bush and all the major EU heads of government - this was the first visit of a sitting US President in Sweden. This summit was an important step for the eastward expansion of the EU three years later, but the event was challenged by protesting left-wing groups rioting and attacking police downtown. A referendum in 2003, after years of uneasy discussion, lead to a resounding no to the proposed adoption of the euro. The perplexing effect on the leading political strata, many business people and the media, in all of which groups the support for the adoption of the euro had been overwhelming, of this vote was increased by the bitter fact that the campaign had been disrupted four days prematurely by the assassination of Foreign Minister Anna Lindh, who, had she lived, would likely have succeeded Göran Persson within one or two years (as confirmed by the PM himself in later interviews and by her obvious standing within her party).

While the assassination of Minister for Foreign Affairs Anna Lindh in September 2003 was not connected to the campaigning on the Euro, or on EU issues in general, and while the trend toward a rejective vote was clear in polls weeks before the referendum, both the Gothenburg riots and the no to the euro showed that many Swedes, and in particular many young Swedes, felt disenfranchised by the new EU-oriented and less self-assured country they were living in.

On 26 December 2004, during a Christmas holiday and Boxing Day celebration, 543 of Swedish people in Thailand and the other parts across the region of South and Southeast Asia were among thousands of people killed by the catastrophic tsunami from the magnitude 9.0 undersea earthquake off Indonesian island's west coast of Sumatra. A memorial service was held at Storkyrkan in Stockholm in January 2005. On behalf of all Scandinavians.

The Ministry for Foreign Affairs was unmanned due to the holidays, and the lack of government action caused a political scandal which shook the confidence of Persson's cabinet, not least Swedish Foreign Minister Laila Freivalds. She resigned after another scandal, where she had been informed in advance of a Swedish Security Service shutdown of the Sweden Democrats' web site featuring the infamous Muhammad cartoons. Swedish press noted that this was the first case of Swedish government censorship due to foreign threat since World War II. Sweden is one of few western countries where these cartoons have not been published in any mainstream mass media, but was still affected though the proximity to Denmark and Norway - Norwegian-Danish-Swedish dairy producer Arla suffered from middle-eastern boycotts, and when Minister for International Development Cooperation Carin Jämtin went to Sudan to investigate the Darfur genocide, the governor of Darfur used the cartoons as a pretext not to receive her.

== The Reinfeldt Era ==
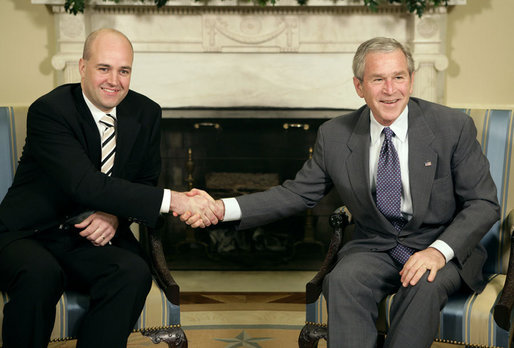
Swedish Prime Minister Fredrik Reinfeldt and U.S. President George W. Bush at the Oval Office in White House, on 15 May 2007.

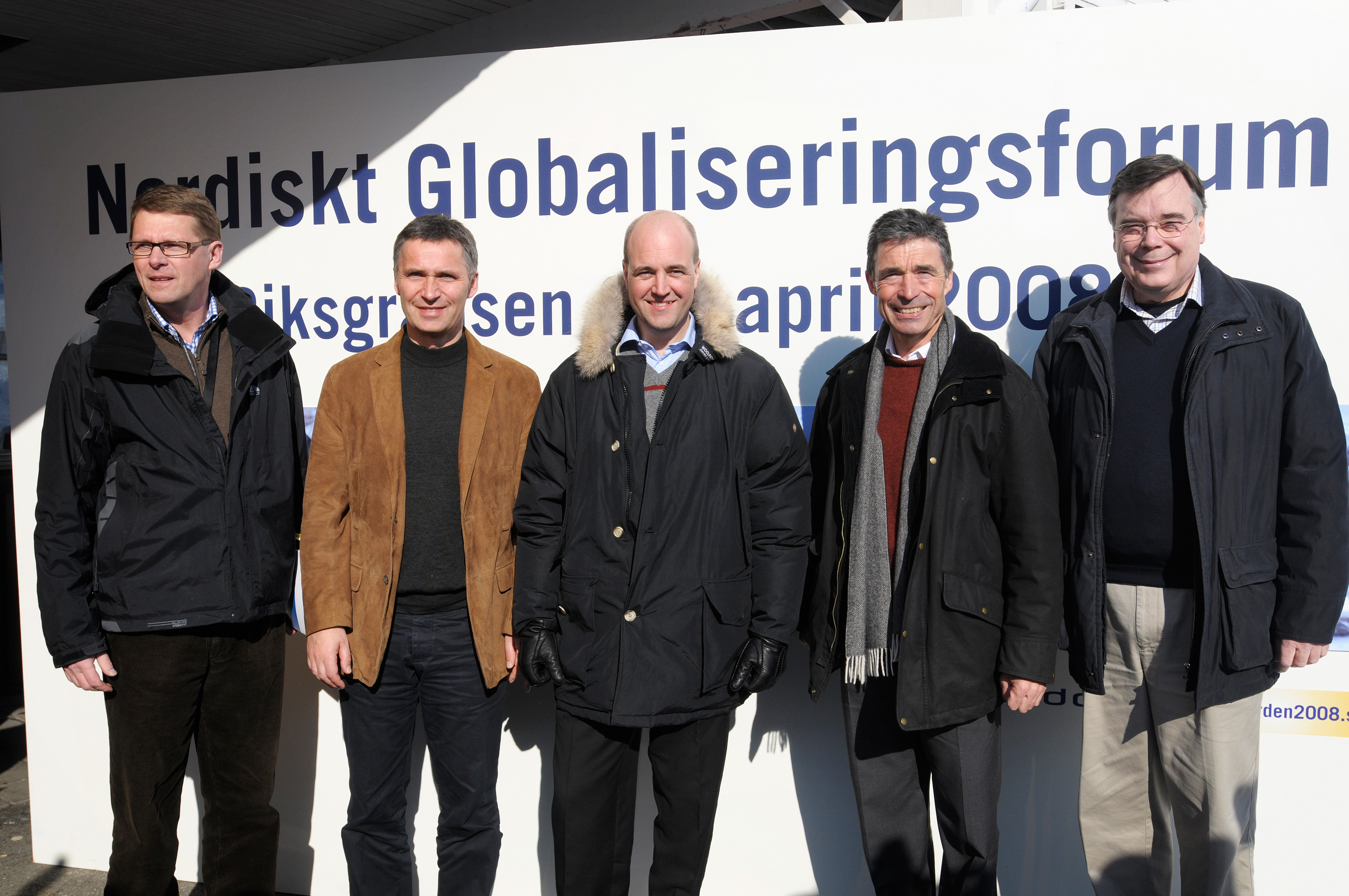
Five Nordic Prime Ministers: (Matti Vanhanen (left) from Finland, Jens Stoltenberg (second left) from Norway, Fredrik Reinfeldt (center) from Sweden, Anders Fogh Rasmussen (second right) from Denmark and Geir Haarde (right) from Iceland) gathered at the Nordic Globalization Forum in Riksgränsen, Sweden, on 8 April 2008.

Several new political parties - among them Feminist Initiative led by former leftist leader Gudrun Schyman, the euro-skeptical June List (originating in the 2004 European Parliament elections) and the anti-copyright Pirate Party ran for the Riksdag election of 2006 with attention from mass media, but with little success. In this election, the conservative coalition "Allians för Sverige" ("Alliance for Sweden") gained a majority in the riksdag and presented Fredrik Reinfeldt of the Moderates as their prime minister candidate. The success of the Sweden Democrats, who gained seats in several municipal councils, and got 2.9% of the Riksdag votes (though not meeting the 4% threshold), intimidated the established parties. During the first week, there was a series of scandals, where some of the cabinet ministers from the Moderate Party turned out to have dodged the television license fee, and paid maids under the table. Ministers Maria Borelius and Cecilia Stegö Chilo stepped down after only a few days in office. The cabinet was criticised for lack of gender equality and diversity because it contained only nine women (out of 22 ministers). On the other hand, defenders of the cabinet pointed out that Sweden now had their first African-born minister (Nyamko Sabuni) and their first openly homosexual minister (Andreas Carlgren) ever. Foreign minister Carl Bildt was questioned for his former directorship in Vostok Nafta, and his possible bias in the question of the planned Nord Stream 1 pipeline. The pipeline in question was intended to reach between Russia and Germany on the floor of the Baltic sea, through Swedish territorial waters.

Reinfeldt's policy was focused at lowering unemployment, by lowering taxes, as well as allowances for sick and unemployed. Until the onset of the subprime crisis employment rose, though the red-green opposition claimed that the main cause has been the current global prosperity.

During the second half of 2009, Sweden held the rotating EU Precedency, during which Reinfeldt represented the EU at several high-profile summits with Barack Obama and other world leaders, including the 2009 United Nations Climate Change Conference in Copenhagen. Reinfeldt also presided over the final negotiations surrounding implementation of The Lisbon Treaty, which entered into force on 1 December 2009, resulting in the appointment of Herman Van Rompuy as President of the European Council and Catherine Ashton as High Representative of the Union for Foreign Affairs and Security Policy.

The boost in perceived statesmanship that Persson enjoyed hosting the EU Presidency in 2001 largely evaded Reinfeldt however, and in opinion polls ahead of the 2010 general election support for his government continuously trailed that of the Social Democratic opposition. The Social Democrats joined forces in December 2008 with the Greens to form a Red-Green coalition to challenge the ruling liberal alliance. Starting in 2009, the Sweden Democrats consistently enjoyed support of over 4% in the opinion polls, and along with the Pirate Party, which got 7.1% in the 2009 EU Parliament election, had the potential to become kingmakers and alter the political landscape at the 2010 general election. However, despite a 5.7% result for the Sweden Democrats and a 49.7% result for the Reinfeldt government, the sitting government could remain as a significantly weaker minority government. The hopes of the Sweden Democrats to become kingmakers were ultimately turned down when both prospective prime ministers publicly announced that they would never cooperate with the Sweden Democrats. Instead both the Social Democrats and the Green party have been giving passive or sometimes active support to the liberal alliance to assure the stability of the government.

In December 2009, Cecilia Malmström was nominated new EU Commissioner, to succeed Margot Wallström, who was appointed UN Special Representative on Sexual Violence in Conflict.

Following in her father's footsteps marrying a commoner, on 24 February 2009 the Royal Court of Sweden officially announced the engagement of Crown Princess Victoria to Daniel Westling. The wedding took place on 19 June 2010 in Stockholm. On 11 August 2009, her sister, Princess Madeleine, announced her engagement to Jonas Bergström. However, their planned wedding was called off in 2010. Princess Madeleine married New York banker Christopher O'Neill in June 2013.

On 11 December 2010, the Swedish capital of Stockholm was attacked by a suicide bomber, killing himself and injuring two others. Minister for Foreign Affairs Carl Bildt described the event as the "Most worrying attempt at terrorist attack in crowded part of central Stockholm. Failed — but could have been truly catastrophic." Although Swedish citizens of foreign background have committed suicide attacks abroad, this was the first time such an incident took place on Swedish ground. The incident is known as the 2010 Stockholm bombings.

After the 2010 Riksdag election, the Alliance formed the new government with Reinfeldt continuing as prime minister. His cabinet has 24 ministers, three more than the previous one. The Moderates received 13 posts, an increase of three from their previous count, with the Liberals (4), Centre (4) and Christian Democrats (3) not gaining or losing ministers. Jan Björklund, the leader of the Liberal Party, was promoted to Deputy Prime Minister replacing Maud Olofsson. Carl Bildt remained Foreign Minister and Anders Borg remained Minister for Finance. The new ministers are Stefan Attefall, the Minister for Public Administration and Housing at the Ministry of Health and Social Affairs; Ulf Kristersson, replacing Cristina Husmark Pehrsson as Minister for Social Security; Erik Ullenhag, the Minister for Integration at the Ministry of Employment; Hillevi Engström, the Minister for Employment; Anna-Karin Hatt, the Minister for Information Technology and Regional Affairs at the Ministry of Enterprise, Energy and Communications; Peter Norman, replacing Mats Odell as Minister for Financial Markets; and Catharina Elmsäter-Svärd, replacing Åsa Torstensson as Minister for Communications. Tobias Krantz, former Minister of Higher Education at the Ministry of Education and Research, is leaving with no successor having been named.

Reinfeldt issued a 30-page statement of government policy, saying it would "seek a broad-based and responsible solutions (sic)", and that it would "be natural...to hold regular discussions with the Green Party, in the first instance and also the Social Democratic Party where appropriate." In practice, this meant the end of the more far reaching reforms carried out by the Reinfeldt government as all decisions needed to be approved by one of the opposition parties. It also meant that the opposition, when supported by the Sweden Democrats, could get a majority in the Riksdag. This happened for example in the sensitive issues of unemployment subsidies and healthcare.

== The Löfven Era ==
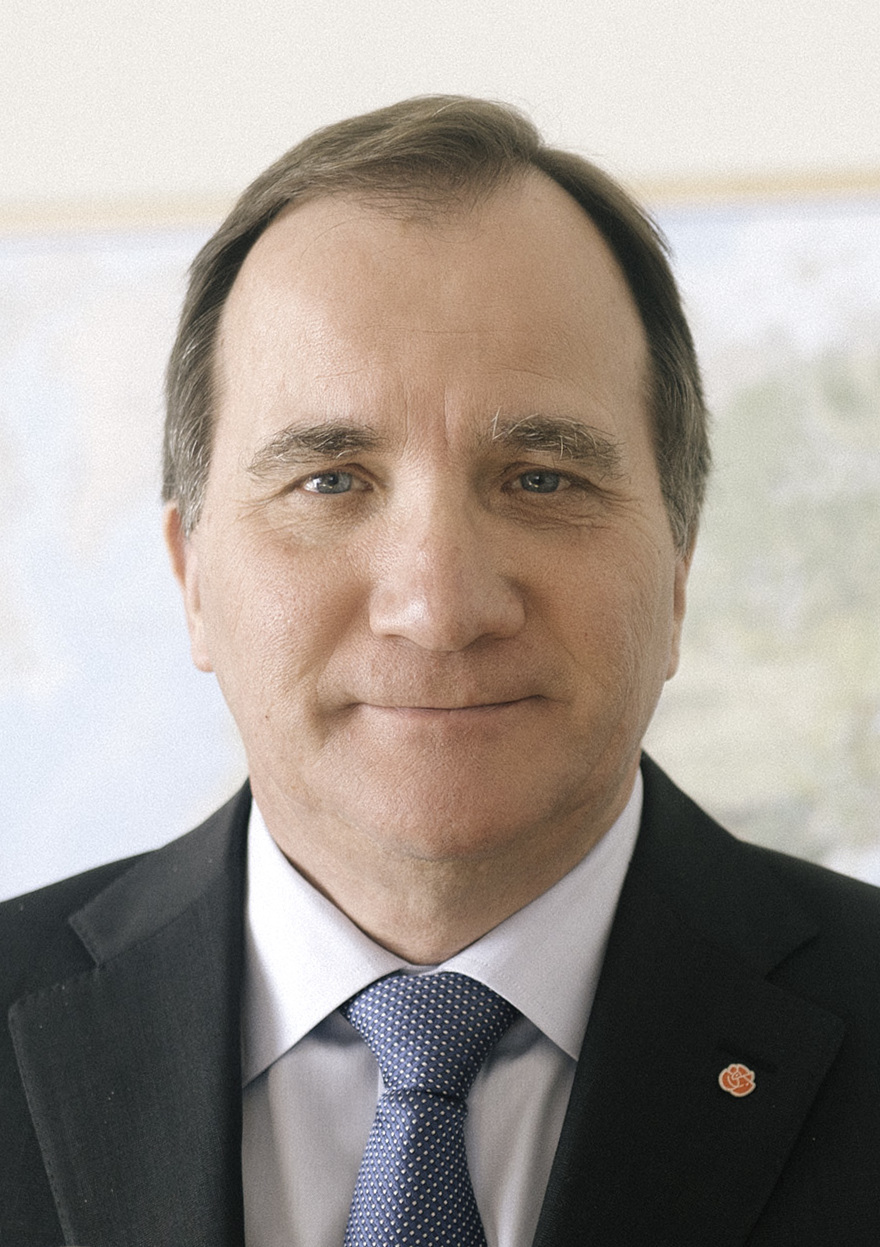
Former Swedish Prime Minister Stefan Löfven in 2017

Stefan Löfven won the 2014 Swedish general election and formed a new government and in his first few months was challenged after the Sweden Democrats voted against his budget. During 2015, the number of asylum seekers, mainly from Syria, Iraq and Afghanistan, reached its highest level of all time.

In 2019, Löfven was re-elected for a second four-year term and formed a coalition government together with the Greens. Löfven this time secured fewer seats than during the previous term, and the government relied upon the support of the Greens, the Centre Party and the Liberals. The Alliance between the four centre-right parties, (the Moderates, Centre Party, Liberals and the Christian Democrats) effectively ceased to exist during the attempts at forming a government. Differences regarding the potential involvement of the right-wing Sweden Democrats in a proposed centre-right government coalition split the Alliance. This eventually led to the Centre Party and Liberals signing an agreement with the Social Democrats and Greens in January 2019. This was much to the dissatisfaction of the more conservative Moderates and Christian Democrats, with the latter party's leader Ebba Busch Thor calling the Alliance a "closed chapter". The January Agreement was the document that kept Löfven's minority government in power. The Centre Party and Liberals would tolerate the election of Stefan Löfven as Prime Minister as long as the policies of the two centre-right parties got to play a role in government. The agreement contained numerous liberal economic reforms - the most notable of which include the abolishing of some taxes (such as the värnskatt) and a guarantee that the government would not seek to limit or prevent the ability of private companies to generate profits from their work in the public welfare system. The agreement also affirmed that the socialist Left Party would not have any influence over Swedish politics during the next few years.

A government crisis ensued when, following a vote of no-confidence, Löfven was ousted by parliament in June 2021. The Left Party opposed a proposed reform to allow for freely-set market-based rents on newly built residential developments: they had vowed to initiate a vote of no-confidence against the government unless the proposal was withdrawn. The Sweden Democrats initiated the vote and, together with the Left and the opposition parties of the right, a majority was formed against the Prime Minister. After being given one week either to call a snap election or resign, Löfven chose the latter on 28 June. The Speaker of the Riksdag Andreas Norlén then tasked Moderate Party leader and leader of the opposition Ulf Kristersson with forming a government, giving him until 2 July. However, Kristersson failed to win enough support. On 7 July 2021, Sweden's parliament backed the return of Stefan Löfven as prime minister, weeks after he became the first Swedish leader to lose a no-confidence vote.

== The Andersson Era ==
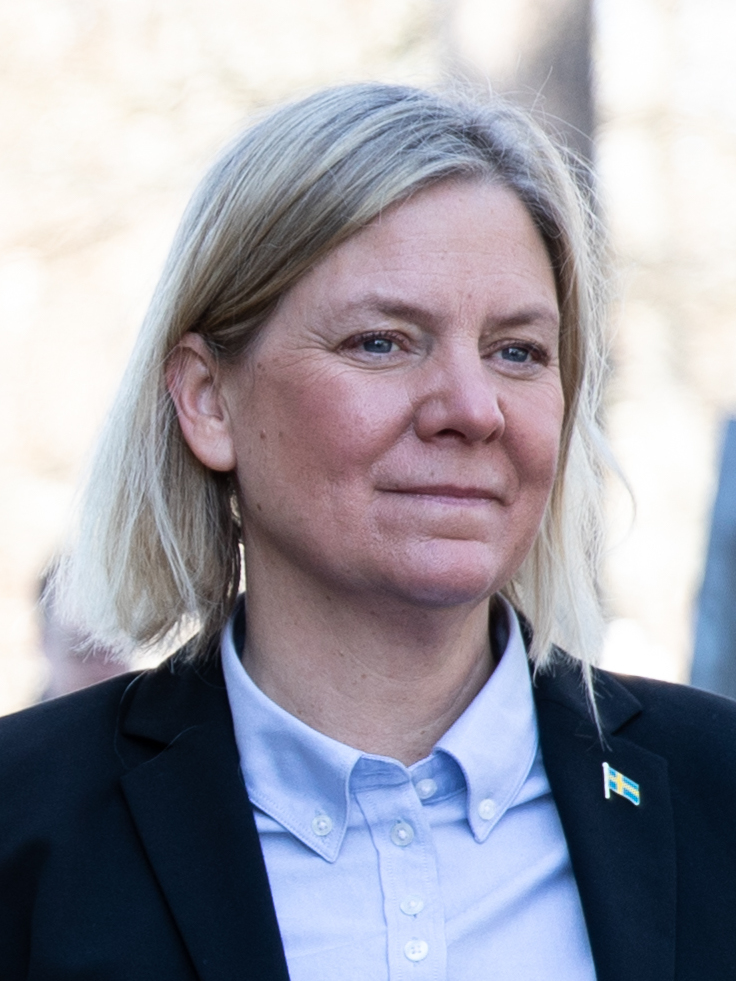
Former Swedish Prime Minister Magdalena Andersson in 2022

In August 2021, Prime Minister Stefan Lofven announced his resignation and finance minister Magdalena Andersson was elected as the new head of Sweden's ruling Social Democrats in November 2021. On 30 November 2021, Magdalena Andersson became Sweden's first female prime minister. She formed a minority government made up of only her Social Democrats. Her plan for forming a new coalition government with the Green Party was unsuccessful because her budget proposal failed to pass.

In May 2022, Sweden formally applied to join the NATO alliance. Public opinion in the Nordic region had changed in favour of joining NATO since Russia's 24 February invasion of Ukraine.

The September 2022 general election ended in a narrow win to a bloc of right-wing parties, meaning the resignation of Magdalena Andersson's government.

== The Kristersson Era ==
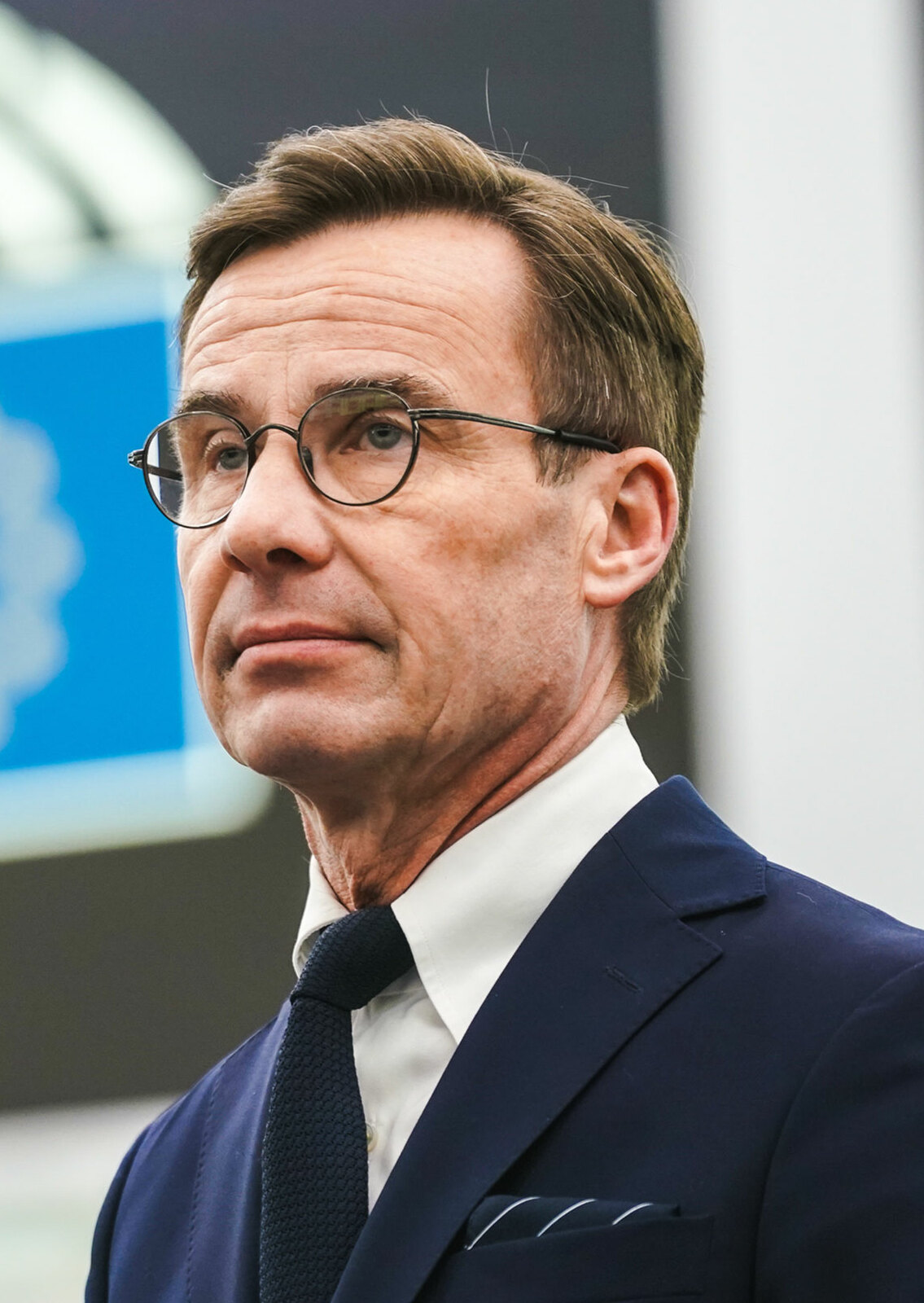
Ulf Kristersson, current Prime Minister of Sweden

On 18 October 2022, Ulf Kristersson of the Moderate Party became the new Prime Minister of Sweden. Kristersson's Moderates formed a centre-right coalition with the Christian Democrats and the Liberals. The new government was backed by the biggest right-wing party, Sweden Democrats (SD) led by Jimmie Åkesson, meaning tougher immigration policies as a crucial part of a policy deal with the SD. Soon after his appointment, new foreign minister, Tobias Billström, announced that Sweden would renounce "feminist foreign policy", implemented by the previous left-wing government.

On 7 March 2024, Sweden became NATO’s 32nd member country.

== Culture and mass media ==
During the 1990s Sweden became a leading power in information technology. Swedish Prime Minister Carl Bildt (M) and American President Bill Clinton were the world's first heads of government to exchange e-mail. Mobile telephony spread fast during the same decade, thanks to fruitful cooperation between the manufacturer Ericsson and government-owned network operator Televerket (which is now part of TeliaSonera). Sweden has converted to digital terrestrial television and is expanding the 3G network.

Since the 1990s, Sweden has been relatively tolerant of homosexuality and in 2002 outlawed hate speech against it. The first prosecution for this crime was in 2004–5 against Pentecostal Åke Green, a case which brought international attention. However, Åke Green was eventually acquitted. Same-sex marriage was legalized in 2009.

Another criminal case that brought international attention was The Pirate Bay trial in 2009, where four individuals was charged with promoting copyright infringement with the popular torrent tracking website The Pirate Bay. This perceived unfair prosecution of file sharers and general curtailment of freedom and privacy on the Internet gave rise to the Pirate Party, which gained a lot of traction ahead of the 2009 EU Parliament elections. This was in the wake of the contested Enforcement Directive (IPRED) and legislative changes regulating the National Defence Radio Establishment (FRA).

== Popular culture ==
In 1997 SVT introduced Expedition Robinson, the origin of the Survivor format, which launched the reality television genre worldwide. The show was one of the biggest and most controversial successes in Scandinavia: the final episode of season four was viewed by 4,045,000 people out of a total population of 8.8 million.

Several Swedish recording artists and bands gained international success during the period, such as Ace of Base, The Cardigans, Dr. Alban, Army of Lovers, Stakka Bo, Rednex and Robyn. In 1993, Ace of Base had the world's biggest-selling debut album with a 23 million album sales for 'Happy Nation'. In addition, Swedish Songwriter/Producer Denniz Pop and Max Martin have written worldwide hits for pop artists like Britney Spears, Backstreet Boys and Celine Dion. Heavy metal bands such as Dismember, Entombed and At the Gates in the 1990s has had a huge influence on metal music worldwide, while bands such as In Flames, Opeth, Dark Tranquillity and Amon Amarth are well known worldwide and help to spread the good image of Sweden to the rest of the world. In the last couple of years, many Swedish indie pop/rock acts have become widely known outside the country, for example Lykke Li, The Knife and Mando Diao.

Sweden won the Eurovision Song Contest five times, these being in 1991 with Carola, in 1999 with Charlotte Nilsson, in 2012 and 2023 with Loreen and in 2015 with singer Måns Zelmerlöw.

== Sports ==
Sweden has continued its success in sports such as alpine skiing (Pernilla Wiberg and Anja Pärson), golf (Annika Sörenstam), ice hockey (Mats Sundin, Nicklas Lidström and Peter Forsberg), and football (Tomas Brolin, Henrik Larsson and Zlatan Ibrahimović). Sweden has also emerged as a great power in track and field with world champions as Carolina Klüft, Kajsa Bergqvist, Stefan Holm, Christian Olsson and Susanna Kallur, and hosting of the World Championships in 1995 and the European Championships in 2006, both in Gothenburg. The national swimming team has boasted champions like Anders Holmertz, Therese Alshammar and Emma Igelström. In 2006, the ice hockey team won gold at the Turin Olympics and also at the World Championship in Riga, becoming the first hockey team ever to win at both the Winter Olympics and the World Championships in the same year.

Sweden is eighth in the all-time Olympic Games medal count (ninth for the Summer Olympic Games and sixth for the Winter Olympic Games). Although this success can be partly explained by competing countries' casualties in the World Wars, and boycotts during the Cold War, Sweden remains a great power in sports despite its small size.

In 2001, having successfully managed Roma, Fiorentina, Benfica, Sampdoria and Lazio, Sven-Göran Eriksson controversially became the first foreign manager of the English national team, managing the team for two World Cups and Euro 2004. He made it to spot 97 on the 100 Greatest Swedes list published by the daily DN in 2009. Elin Nordegren married professional golfer Tiger Woods in 2004 and gained worldwide attention during their public falling out in late 2009.
