= Eva Nordmark =

Swedish politician (born 1971)

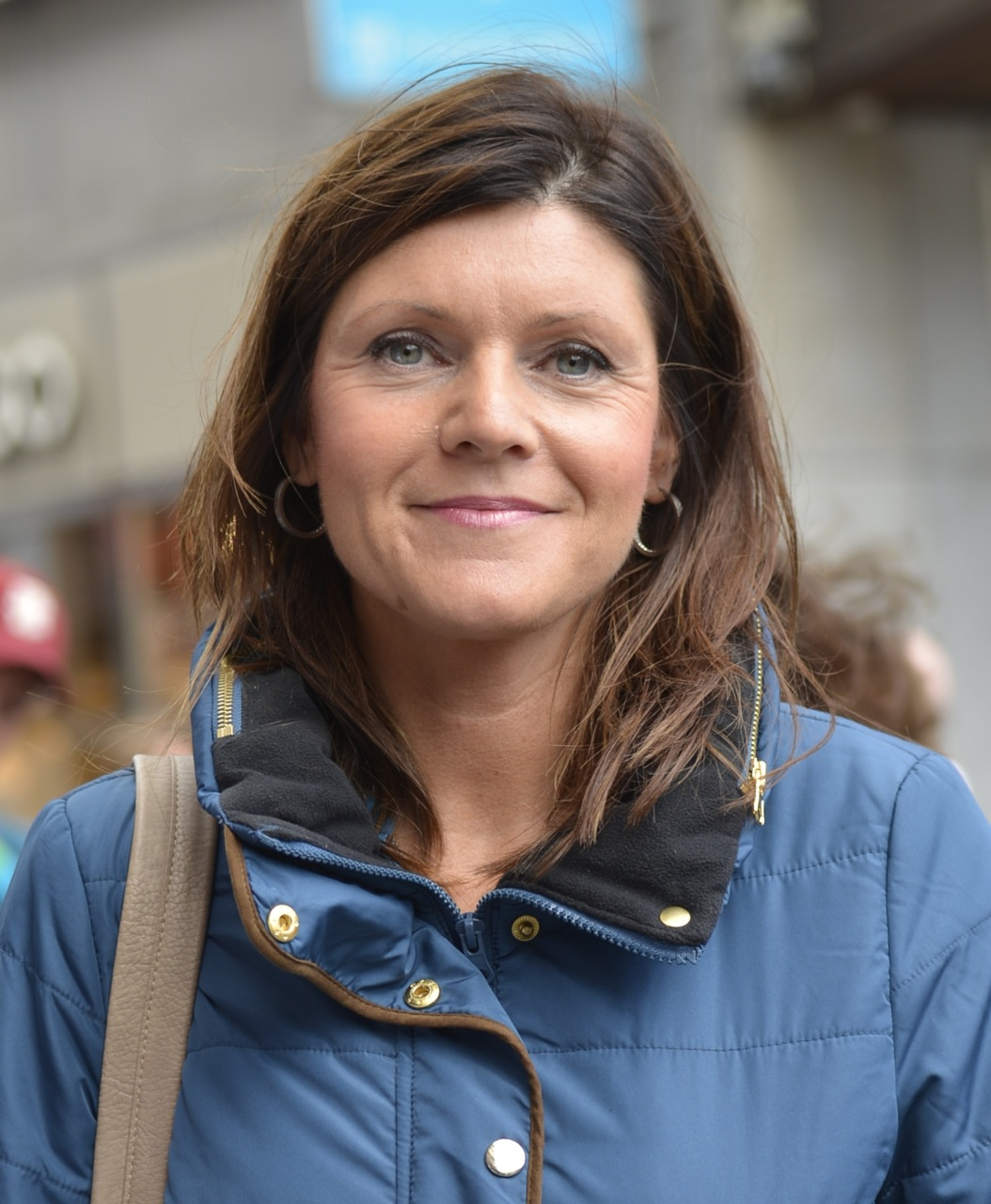

Minister for Employment
- In office 10 September 2019 – 18 October 2022
- Monarch: Carl XVI Gustaf
- Prime Minister: Stefan Löfven; Magdalena Andersson
- Preceded by: Ylva Johansson
- Succeeded by: Johan Pehrson

Minister for Gender Equality
- In office 30 November 2021 – 18 October 2022
- Monarch: Carl XVI Gustaf
- Prime Minister: Magdalena Andersson
- Preceded by: Märta Stenevi
- Succeeded by: Paulina Brandberg

Member of the Riksdag
- In office 10 January 1995 – 5 October 1998
- Constituency: Norrbotten County

Personal details
- Born: 21 February 1971 (age 55) Luleå, Sweden
- Party: Social Democrats
- Profession: Union leader

Eva Nordmark (born 21 February 1971) is a Swedish Social Democratic politician and union leader. She served as Minister for Employment in the Löfven cabinet as well as the Andersson Cabinet from September 2019 to October 2022. Previously she was head of the union TCO from 2011 to 2019, and served as a member of Riksdag from 1995 to 1998.

She was born in Luleå and started her political career by joining the Swedish Social Democratic Youth League, SSU, in Norrbotten. At 20, she became a local councillor and was elected an MP at 24. After graduating, Eva Nordmark started working for the Swedish Social Insurance Agency, while becoming increasingly active at the then SKTF trade union, now called Vision. She made a name for herself as a rejuvenator of the union, partly by aiming for 30% of all elected representatives to be younger than 35.
