= 2022 Swedish general election =

- 11 September 2022

All 349 seats in the Riksdag 175 seats needed for a majority
- Opinion polls
- Registered: 7,775,390
- Turnout: 84.2% (▼2.9 pp)
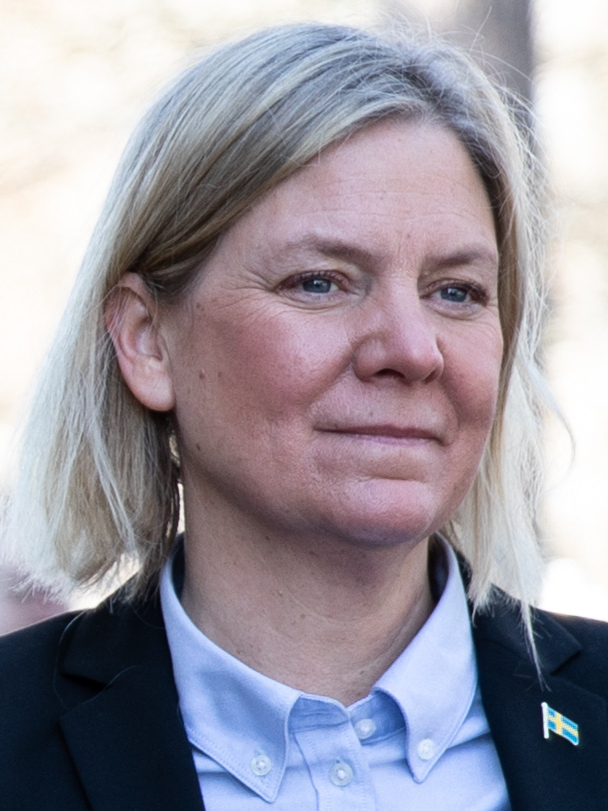

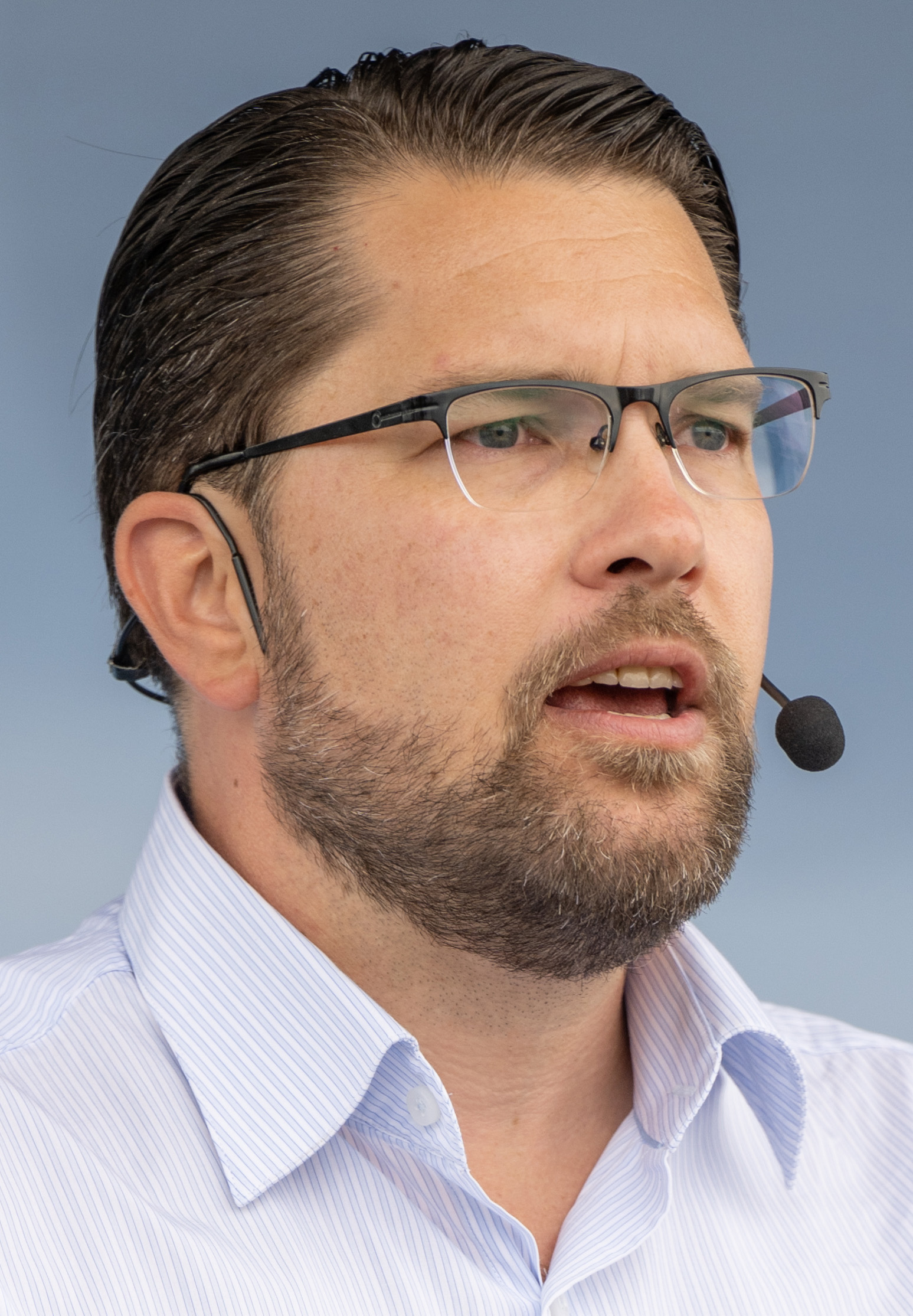

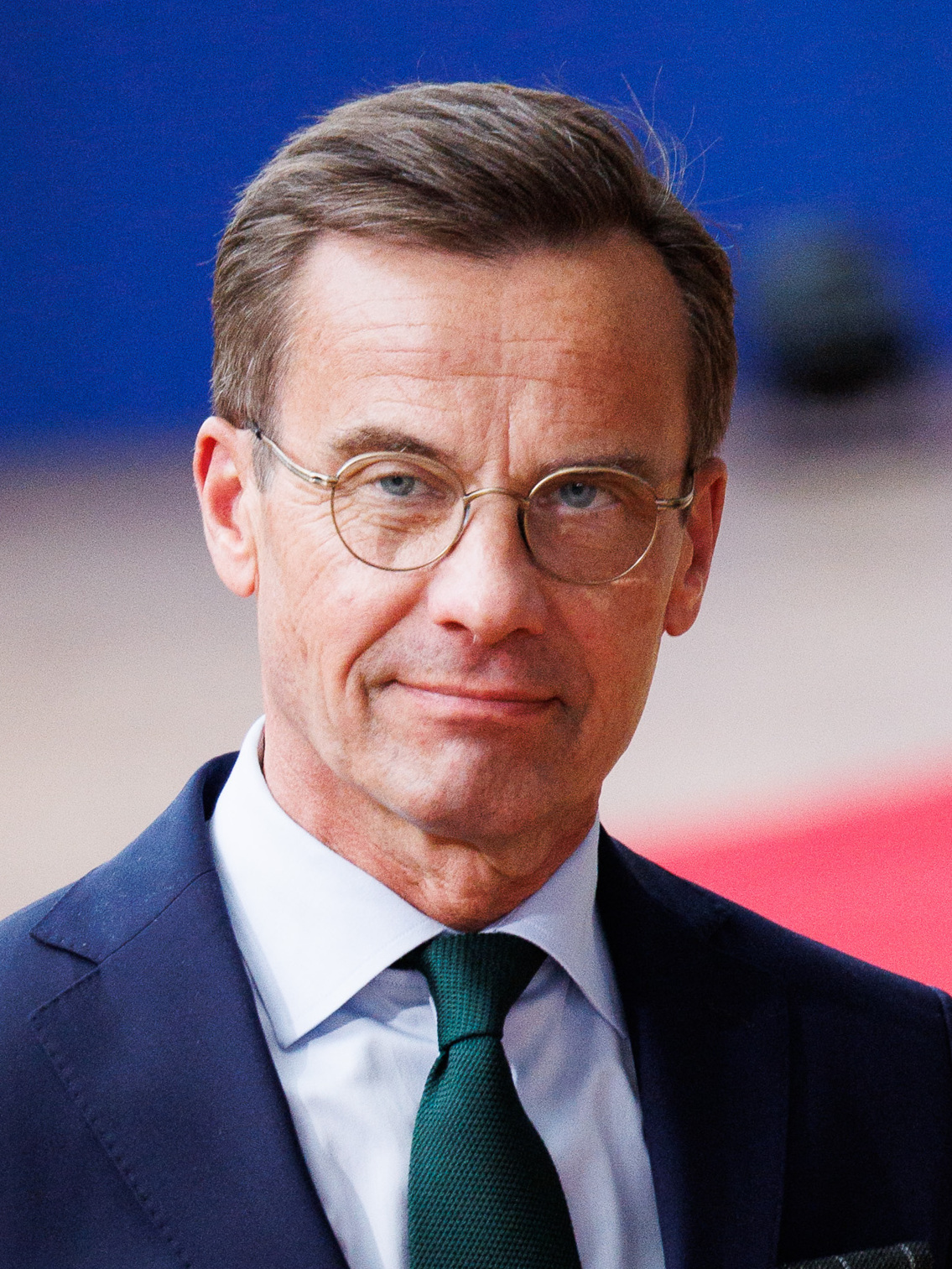

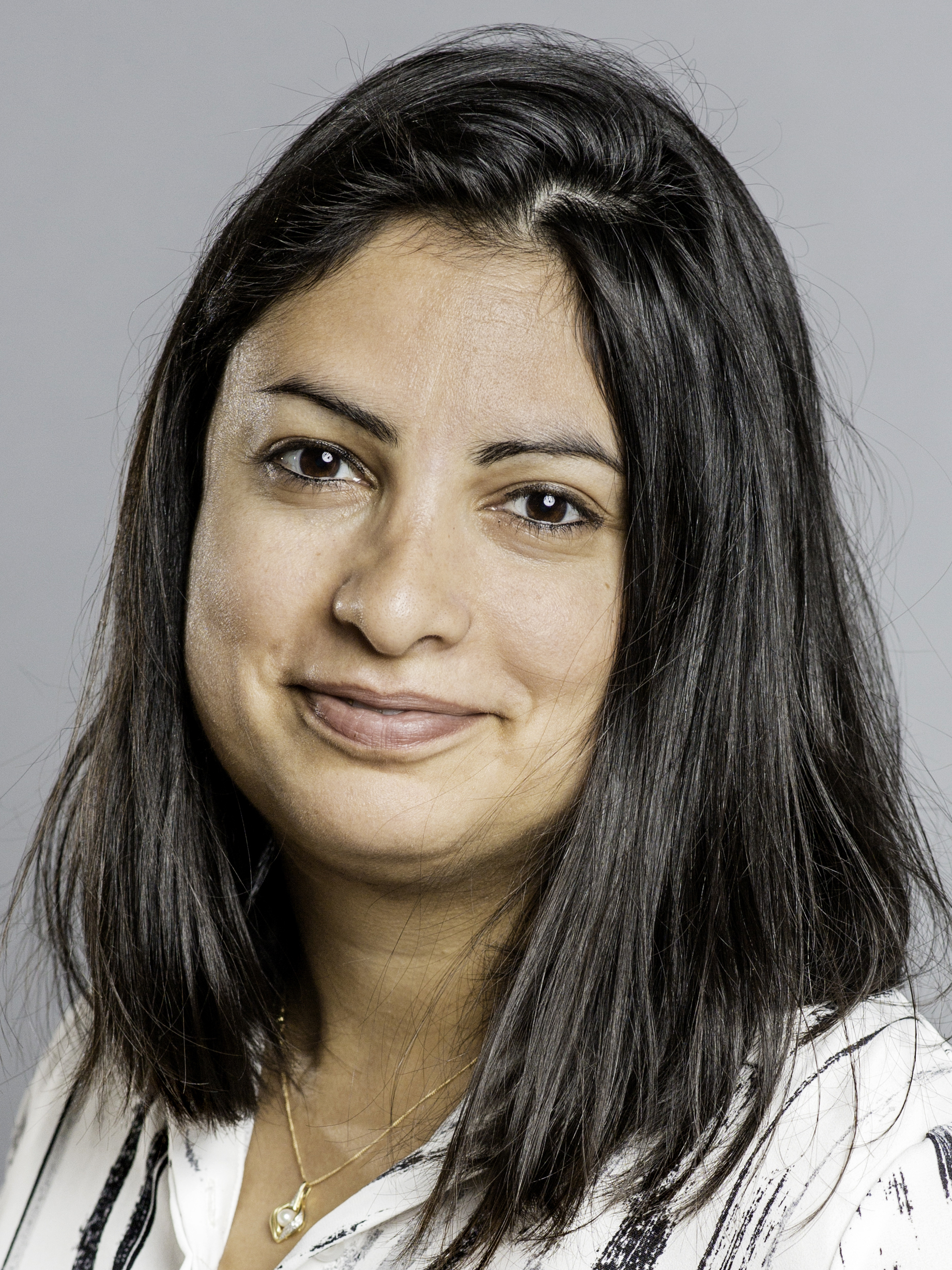

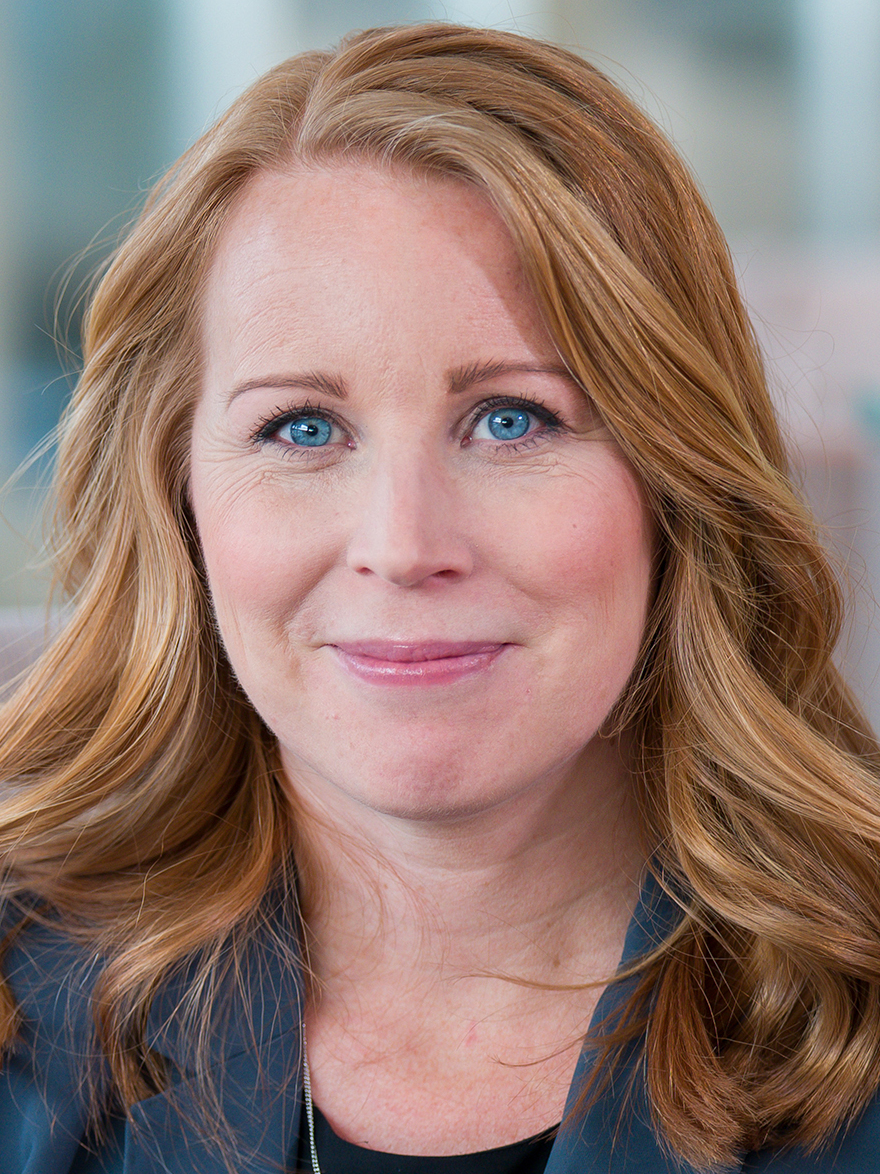

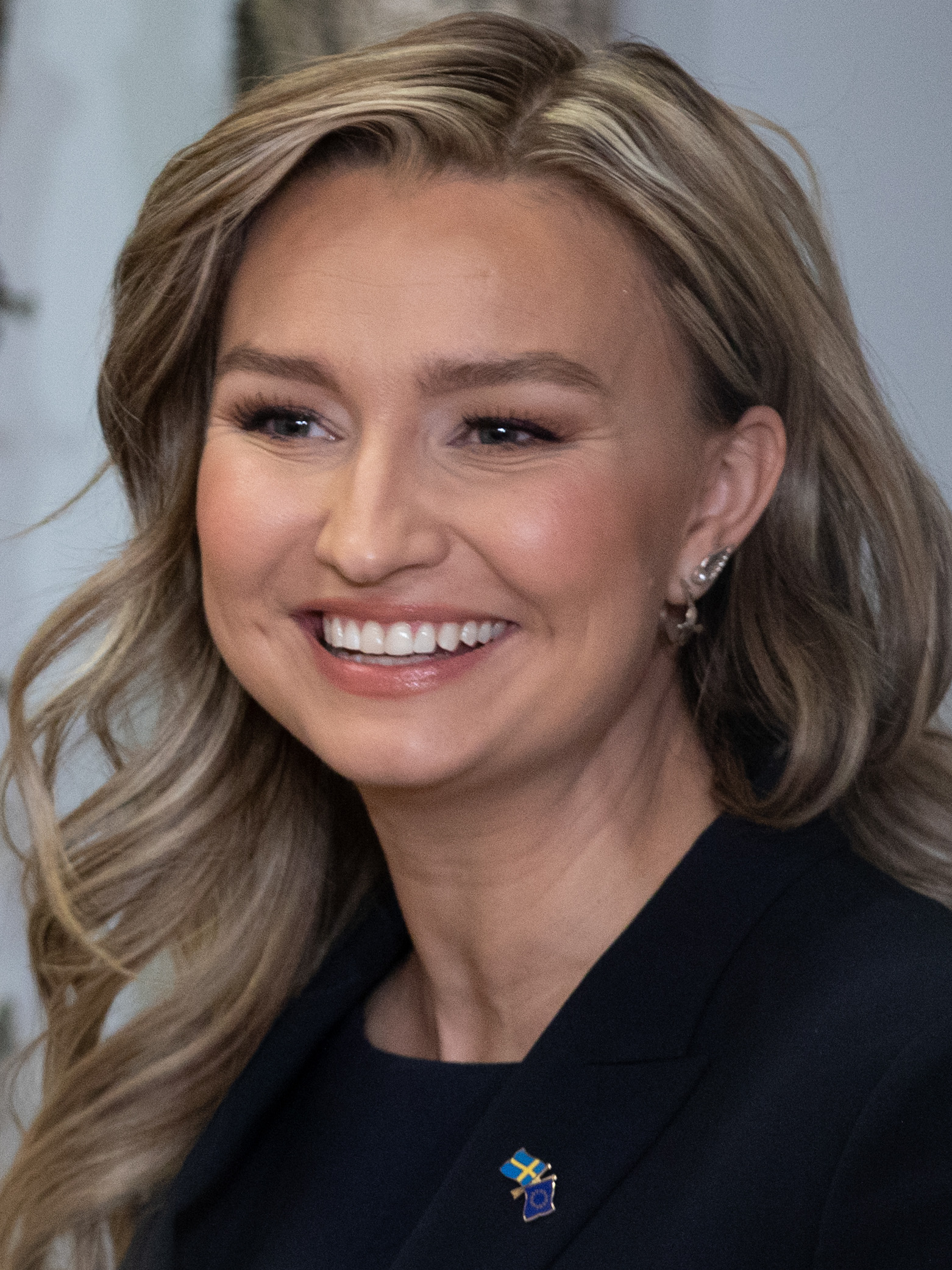

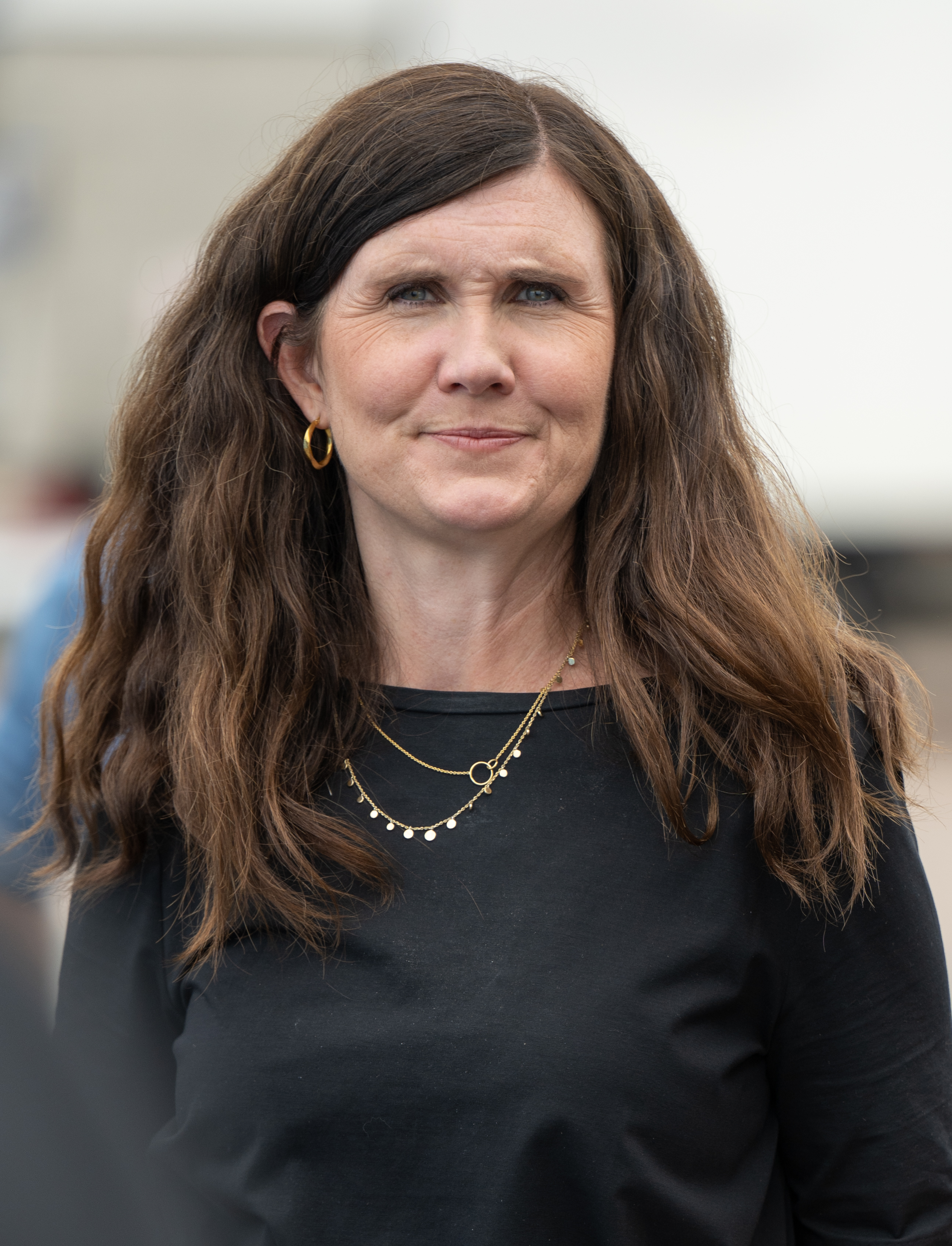

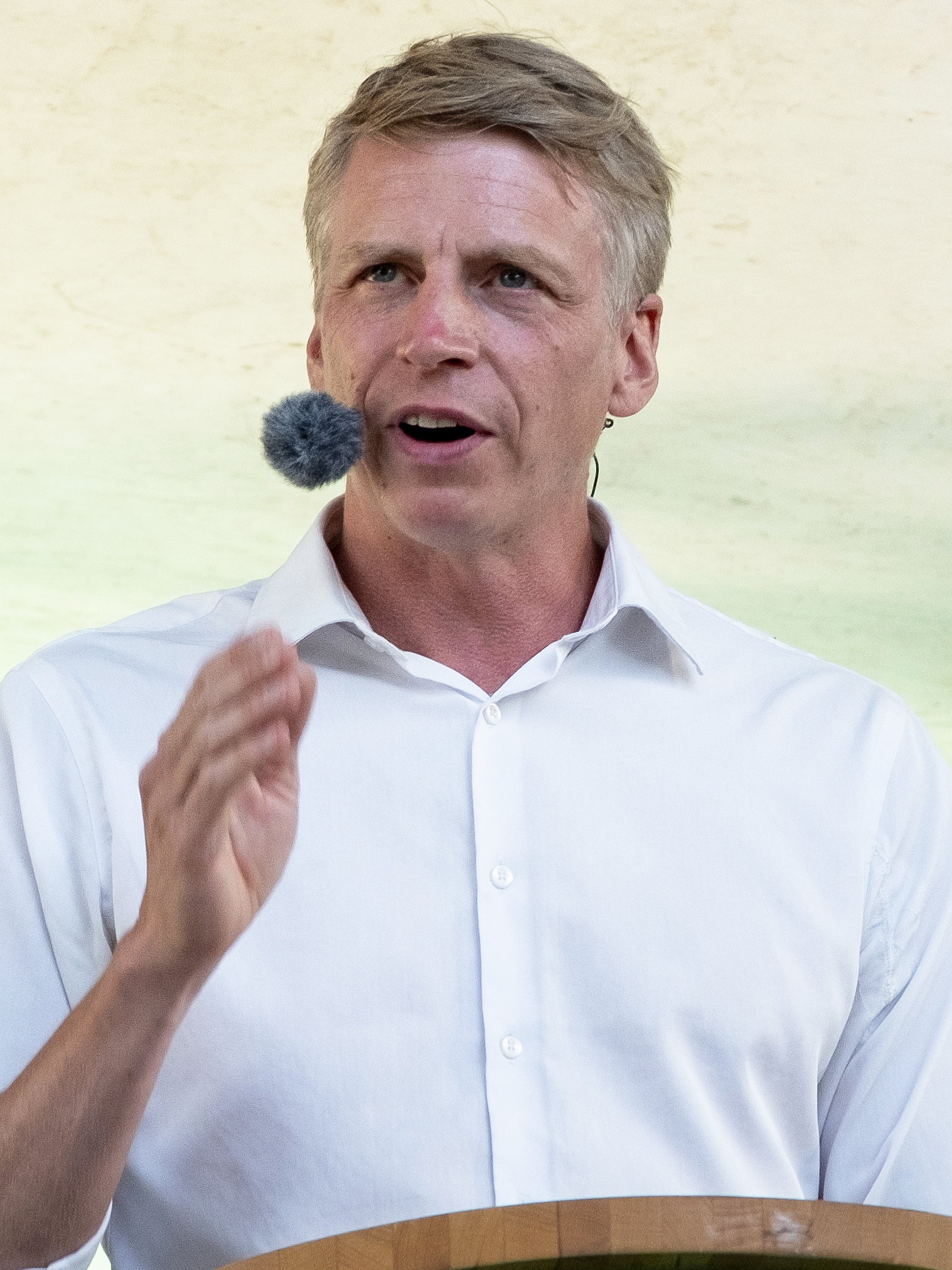

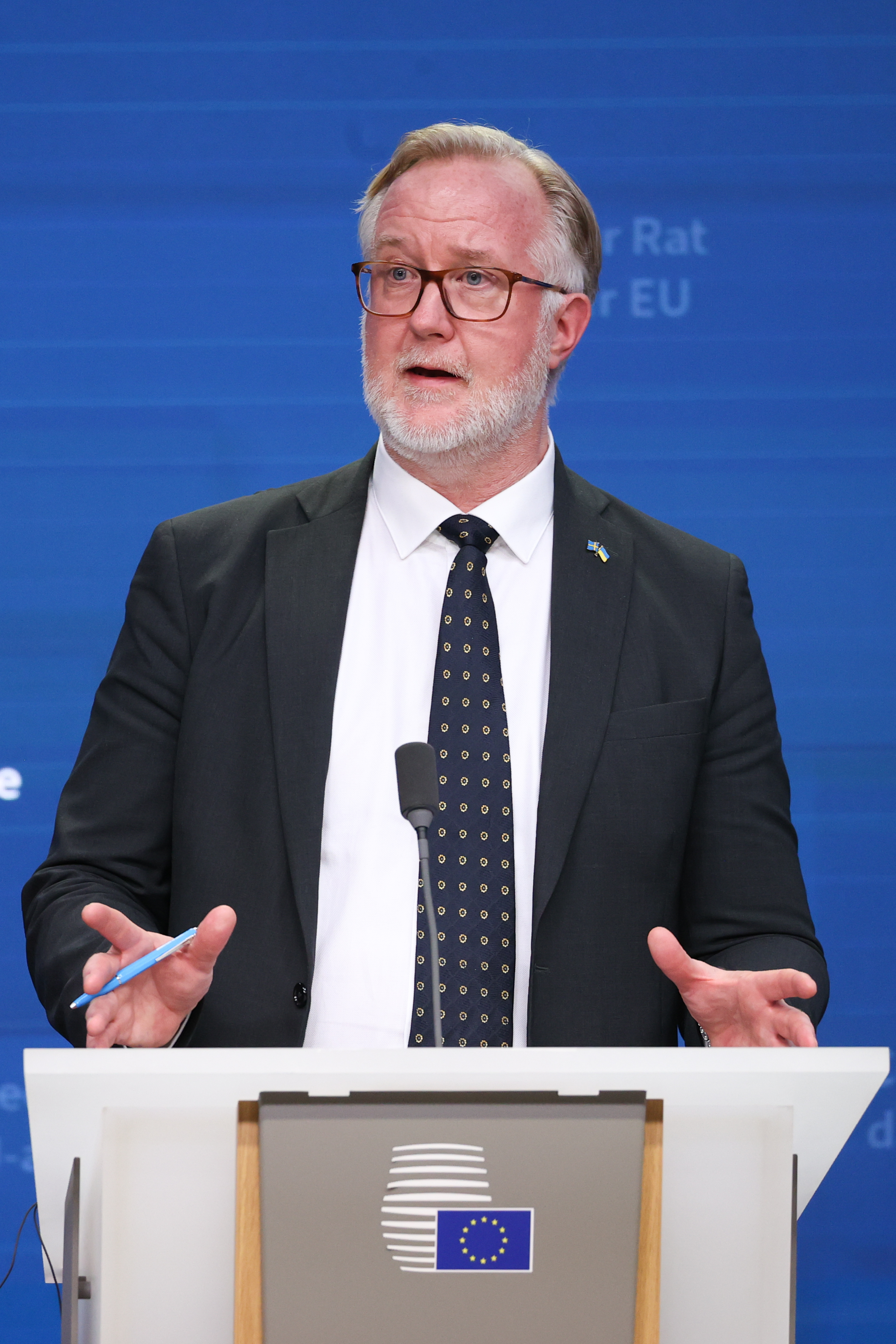
	First party	Second party	Third party
Leader	Magdalena Andersson	Jimmie Åkesson	Ulf Kristersson
Party	Social Democrats	Sweden Democrats	Moderate
Last election	28.3%, 100 seats	17.5%, 62 seats	19.8%, 70 seats
Seats won	107	73	68
Seat change	▲7	▲11	▼2
Popular vote	1,964,474	1,330,325	1,237,428
Percentage	30.3%	20.5%	19.1%
Swing	▲2.0 pp	▲3.0 pp	▼0.7 pp
	Fourth party	Fifth party	Sixth party
Leader	Nooshi Dadgostar	Annie Lööf	Ebba Busch
Party	Left	Centre	Christian Democrats
Last election	8.0%, 28 seats	8.6%, 31 seats	6.3%, 22 seats
Seats won	24	24	19
Seat change	▼4	▼7	▼3
Popular vote	437,050	434,945	345,712
Percentage	6.8%	6.7%	5.3%
Swing	▼1.3 pp	▼1.9 pp	▼1.0 pp
	Seventh party	Eighth party
Leader	Märta Stenevi; Per Bolund	Johan Pehrson
Party	Green	Liberals
Last election	4.4%, 16 seats	5.5%, 20 seats
Seats won	18	16
Seat change	▲2	▼4
Popular vote	329,242	298,542
Percentage	5.1%	4.6%
Swing	▲0.7 pp	▼0.9 pp
Prime Minister before election
Magdalena Andersson
Social Democrats
Prime Minister after election
Ulf Kristersson
Moderate

General elections were held in Sweden on 11 September 2022 to elect the 349 members of the Riksdag who in turn elected the Prime Minister of Sweden. Under the constitution, regional and municipal elections were also held on the same day. The preliminary results presented on 15 September showed the government parties lost their majority, which were confirmed by the final results published on 17 September. After a month of negotiations following the elections that led to the Tidö Agreement among the right-wing bloc, Moderate Party (M) leader Ulf Kristersson was elected prime minister on 17 October. The Kristersson cabinet is a minority government of the Moderates, Christian Democrats (KD) and Liberals (L) that relies on confidence and supply from the Sweden Democrats (SD).

The campaign period was met with issues regarding Sweden's accession to NATO due to the 2022 Russian invasion of Ukraine, as well as crime, energy, the economy, and immigration. Parliamentary parties campaigned through July and August, while in late August SD surpassed M in opinion polls. Exit polls showed that S and its confidence-and-supply parties Left Party, Centre Party and Green Party had a narrow lead against the right-leaning bloc (SD, M, KD, L). During the counting of the preliminary results and later on, Sweden's Election Authority said that the right overtook the left (S, V, C, MP) by three seats. Andersson conceded the election three days later, and resigned the day after that.

The election saw massive swings between the two blocs in different regions. The left-leaning bloc won the most votes in large cities and several university towns with unprecedented massive margins. Stockholm city went red by 18 points, Gothenburg by 11 points and the left also flipped two suburban municipalities in Stockholm County. Meanwhile, the right managed to overturn dozens of municipalities that had historically been dominated by S, especially in the central interior Bergslagen region. In this historically industrial area, the county of Dalarna was won by the right-leaning coalition for the first time in history, while the left held on by just 373 votes in Värmland. Likewise, some municipalities that the outright leftist parties (S, V, MP) had won with an overall majority of 50 points in the 1994 Swedish general election, flipped to the right. In middle Sweden, the right won Eskilstuna, Gävle, Norrköping, Södertälje and Västerås. All five had been historical leftist strongholds.

Major gains in minority were also made by the right-leaning bloc in Northern Sweden, leading the vote in eight municipalities compared to none four years prior. In the lower east, the historically leftist swing counties Kalmar, Södermanland, Västmanland and Östergötland all went to the right to seal the parliamentary majority. S won 30% of the popular vote, with a net increase in spite of the election loss. SD became the second-largest party with above 20% of the popular vote, surpassing M at 19%. The blocs were separated by a thin margin of about half a percentage point. The parties aligned with the outgoing government did somewhat better in the regional and municipal elections.

== Background ==
The Swedish Social Democratic Party (S) regained power after the 2014 Swedish general election, with the Green Party (MP) taking part in Stefan Löfven's coalition government. S retained the position as the largest parliamentary party after the 2018 general election, despite losing 13 seats in comparison with the previous election. The election resulted in a hung parliament, as neither the Red-Greens nor the Alliance had enough seats to form a government, and the Sweden Democrats (SD), which had been subject to a cordon sanitaire by all other parties as an anti-immigration or far-right party, won 62 seats.

Ulf Kristersson, leader of the Moderate Party (M), was given the task of forming the government, and opened up to SD after previously ruling out an alliance with them upon assuming the party leadership in 2017 and during the 2018 election campaign. In turn, the Centre Party (C) and Liberals (L) declined to back his candidacy, as Kristersson wanted SD to take part in the government. Löfven was later given the task, although he also failed to form a government. Speaker of the Riksdag, Andreas Norlén, set another vote to be held in January, and Löfven formed a deal between S, MP, C, L, and the Left Party (V). Löfven was re-elected on 18 January 2019 with S and MP voting in favour, while C, L, and V abstained.

=== Löfven's government ===
The first confirmed case of COVID-19 in Sweden became known on 31 January 2020. The government later ordered 100,000 people a week to be tested to curb the spread of the disease; with insufficient healthcare resources and unclear responsibilities, the goal was not met. In contrast to the World Health Organization, the government did not recommend the use of face masks during the COVID-19 pandemic. During the COVID-19 pandemic, the government did not impose national lockdowns but rather limits on the number of people that were allowed to meet at public places. In December 2019, Kristersson held a meeting with SD leader Jimmie Åkesson, and said that he would cooperate with SD in the Riksdag. According to Ann-Cathrine Jungar of Södertörn University, this put Sweden in line with several other European countries in which centre-right and radical-right parties cooperate. In August 2020, the right-wing opposition criticised the Löfven government for a perceived failure to deal with rising crime including gun violence, which Kristersson called a "second pandemic".

During his premiership, Löfven abolished the austerity tax (Värnskatten), a top tax rate of 5% points for incomes above €6,000 a month, as was requested by the then Liberals leader Jan Björklund in turn for allowing his premiership. V opposed this move and later also stated it would initiate a vote of no confidence due to the government's policies the party saw as "unacceptable". In 2021, S proposed to abolish rent controls for new housing; V responded by initiating a vote of no confidence against the government. Löfven's government was dismissed on 21 June 2021; only S and MP voted in favour of his government. After the dismissal, Nyamko Sabuni, the new leader of the Liberals, stated that her party would not cooperate with S any more. Speaker Norlén proposed Löfven to form a government, and on 7 July the government was re-established. A month later, Löfven announced that he would step down as leader of S and as prime minister in autumn of 2021. Following the disappointing results in the 2018 general election that once again relegated the party to the opposition and saw the dismissal of the centre-right Alliance, M broke the cordon sanitaire in Swedish politics and opened up to SD. By autumn 2021, the right-wing opposition (M, SD, KD, L) formed an informal agreement for a future M–KD government headed by Kristersson of the Moderate Party as prime minister with the external support of L and SD.

=== Andersson's government ===
The Social Democrats held a party congress on 4 November 2021, to elect a new leader; former Minister for Finance, Magdalena Andersson, succeeded Löfven as the leader of the party. Speaker Norlén proposed Andersson to form a government, and after securing a deal with V, Andersson was elected as prime minister on 24 November. MP pulled out of confidence and supply for her government, which led to Andersson's resignation seven hours after her election as prime minister. MP quit the government due to the passage of the opposition's budget in place of that of the government.

Speaker Norlén nominated Andersson again, and on 29 November she was re-elected with 101 votes in favour and 75 abstentions. Considering that MP did not vote in favour of the government, the Andersson Cabinet would be only composed of members of S. Heading into the 2022 general election, Andersson's leadership moved the Social Democrats to the left after the publication of a May 2021 party report, "Distributional Policies for Equality and Fairness", which criticised the rising inequalities that emerged from political decisions by previous left and right governments.

Following the beginning of the 2022 Russian invasion of Ukraine, Andersson's government applied with Finland to join NATO on 18 May 2022, despite the historical opposition of Social Democrats to NATO. During the vote in the Riksdag, only MP and V voted against joining NATO. In July the government signed the accession protocol to join NATO. Andersson's government received high approval ratings.

== Electoral system ==
The Riksdag is made up of 349 seats, and all are elected through open list and proportional representation on multi-member party lists. Of the 349 seats, 310 are elected within the 29 constituencies. The number of members per district ranges from 2 to 40. The remainder – the 39 other members – are apportioned nationally as levelling seats to ensure a proportional result. They are allocated to particular districts. Were a party to win more constituencies than it is entitled to overall, a redistribution of constituency seats may occur to reduce the number of constituency seats won by that party. Sweden has the distinction of having elections on a fixed date with a parliamentary system in which early elections can be called. In the latter case, the newly elected legislature would serve the remainder of the four-year term begun by the previous legislature. Elections are organised on the second Sunday of September every four years, at the same time as the municipal and regional elections.

Each of the 29 constituencies has a set number of parliamentarians that is divided through constituency results to ensure regional representation. The other members of parliament (MPs) are then elected through a proportional balancing, to ensure that the numbers of elected MPs for the various parties accurately represent the votes of the electorate. The Swedish constitution (Regeringsformen) 1 Ch. 4 § says that the Riksdag is responsible for taxation and making laws, and 1 Ch. 6 § says that the government is held responsible to the Riksdag. This means that Sweden has parliamentarism in a constitutional monarchy – ensuring that the government is responsible to the people's representatives. A minimum of 4% of the national vote, or alternatively 12% or more within a constituency, is required for a party to enter the Riksdag. Were the latter to occur, the party only gains representation within that constituency's seat share. In previous Swedish elections, voters could openly pick up several party-specific ballots and then, in the voting booth, use the ballot they chose. Two election observers of the OSCE who were present at the 2018 general election criticised this system, saying that the open selection of party-specific ballots could endanger ballot secrecy. This was changed in the 2022 election. Election officials are responsible for party-specific ballot papers being present in the voting places for parties that have obtained more than one per cent of the votes in the previous parliamentary election. A voter may write in the party name of choice on a blank ballot paper to cast a vote if there is no access to the desired party-specific ballot paper.

=== Political parties ===
The table below lists political parties represented in the Riksdag after the 2018 general election.

Name	Ideology	Political position	Leader	2018 result		Pre-election
Name	Ideology	Political position	Leader	Votes (%)	Seats	
Swedish Social Democratic Party	Social democracy	Centre-left	Magdalena Andersson	28.26%	100 / 349	100 / 349
Moderate Party	Liberal conservatism	Centre-right	Ulf Kristersson	19.84%	70 / 349	70 / 349
Sweden Democrats	Right-wing populism	Right-wing to far-right	Jimmie Åkesson	17.53%	62 / 349	61 / 349
Centre Party	Liberalism	Centre to centre-right	Annie Lööf	8.61%	31 / 349	31 / 349
Left Party	Socialism	Left-wing	Nooshi Dadgostar	8.00%	28 / 349	27 / 349
Christian Democrats	Christian democracy	Centre-right to right-wing	Ebba Busch	6.32%	22 / 349	22 / 349
Liberals	Conservative liberalism	Centre-right	Johan Pehrson	5.49%	20 / 349	20 / 349
Green Party	Green politics	Centre-left	Märta Stenevi; Per Bolund	4.41%	16 / 349	16 / 349
Independents (Note: Amineh Kakabaveh (formerly Left Party); Roger Richthoff (formerly Sweden Democrats))	—N/a					2 / 349

== Campaign ==
=== Issues ===
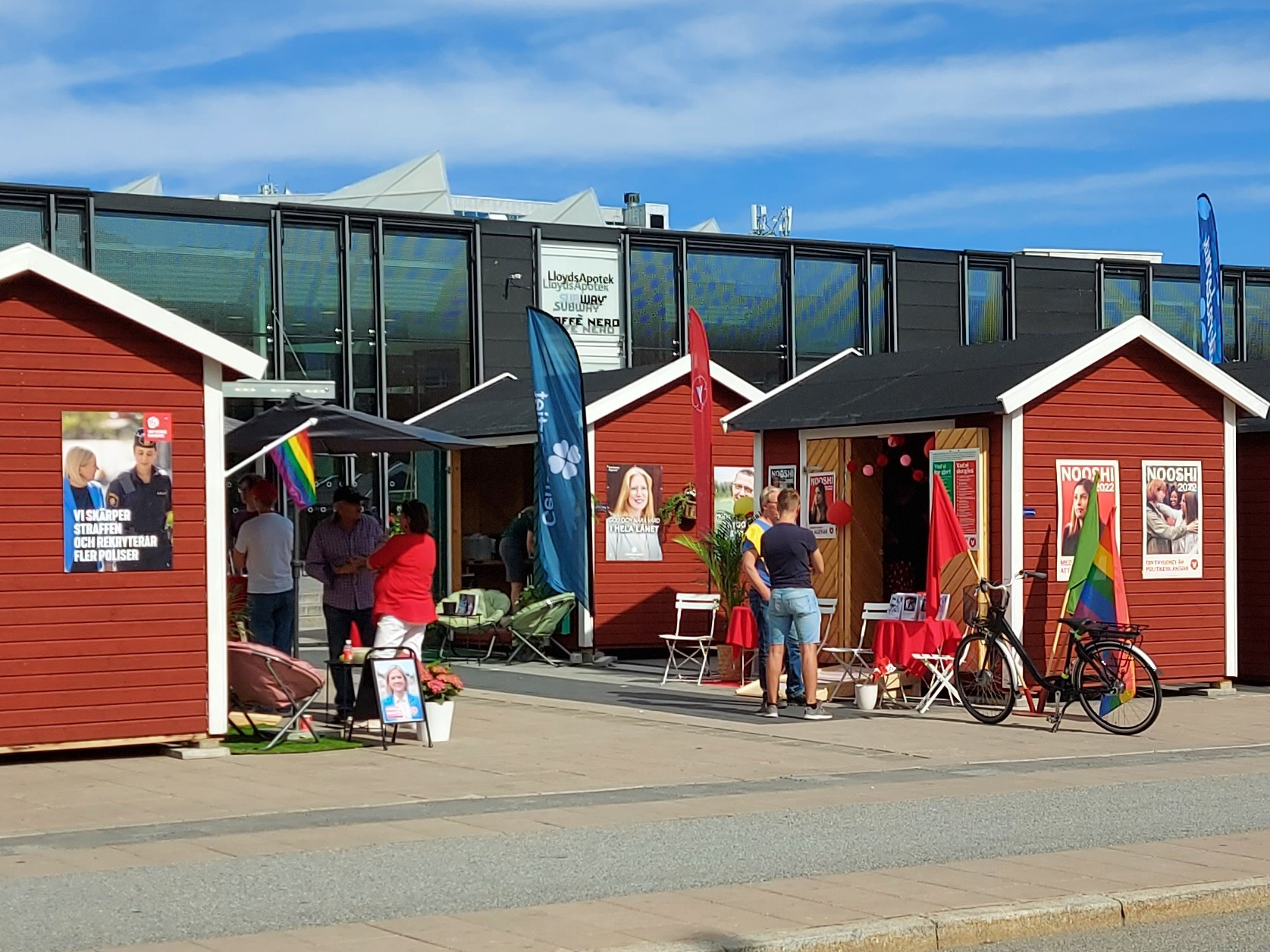
Political parties campaigning in Uppsala

After the beginning of the 2022 Russian invasion of Ukraine, campaign issues shifted towards the NATO accession of Sweden, as well as of neighbouring Finland. Opinion polls after the invasion showed that a majority of respondents supported the accession of Sweden, a militarily non-aligned country, to NATO for the first time. The Swedish Social Democratic Party (S) and Sweden Democrats (SD), who had historically favoured neutrality, revised their stance on the issue and stated their support for joining NATO. The Green Party (MP) remained opposed, while the Left Party (V) stated that they would opt for a referendum on the subject.

Crime was a key campaign issue. Issues regarding immigration also played a key role during the campaign period, and issues related to gang crime were talked about the most. Additionally, issues regarding energy, healthcare, law and order, education, economy, and environment were also talked about during the campaign period.

=== Party campaigns ===
The Social Democrats published their election manifesto, in which the party had promised to tackle issues regarding crime, welfare, climate, green industry, and rising prices. It had also called for automatic preschool for three-year-old children. During their campaign, the Social Democrats voiced support for nuclear power. Andersson criticised the Moderate Party's proposal regarding property tax warnings. The Moderate Party stated that it would want to reduce immigration to the "same levels as Denmark and Norway"; additionally, it would want to make asylum laws more restrictive and to abolish the "track change system", which allows rejected asylum seekers to apply for work permits. Kristersson proposed that the state should set a price threshold for energy bills. The Sweden Democrats campaigned on lowering asylum migration to "close to zero", as well as introducing longer prison sentences. Åkesson also stated his support for stricter work permits. In August the Sweden Democrats surged in opinion polls due to their tough stance on crime and immigration, surpassing the Moderate Party.

In August Lööf stated that she would want the Centre Party (C) to be part of a Social Democrat-led government (S, C, V, MP). Lööf was later a target of attack by a former member of the Nordic Resistance Movement, a neo-Nazi political party. During the election campaign, the Left Party campaigned on "taking back control over welfare" and climate issues. Dadgostar stated her support for investing in green technology and infrastructure, and also criticised the parties on the right. She also stated that the Left Party would work with parties on the left to form a government. The Christian Democrats (KD) campaigned on installing more security cameras and increasing funding in resources for the police to fight gang crime. Busch called for the re-opening of Ringhals Nuclear Power Plant, as well as expanding water and wind production. The Liberals (L) stated their support for more investments into solar, wind, and nuclear power. Additionally, the Liberals stated that they would want to lower taxes on electricity, especially VAT and excise taxes. In August 2022 there was an internal conflict among the Liberals regarding campaigning on a bus tour that would have included SD. Pehrson responded by stating that the four parties (M, SD, KD, L) would visit a nuclear power plant together, and described it as "hardly a big ideological question". There was also internal criticism regarding cooperating with SD on the budget. The Green Party campaigned on climate and social issues, including investment and expansion of rail/train transport in Sweden, and replacing fossil fuels and diesel with renewable fuels, as well as protecting free media and initiating a citizenship initiative system to allow in part for legislation proposed by citizens.

=== Slogans ===
Party	Original slogan	English translation
Swedish Social Democratic Party	Tillsammans kan vi göra vårt Sverige bättre	Together we can make our Sweden better
Moderate Party	Nu får vi ordning på Sverige	Let's get Sweden in order
Sweden Democrats	Sverige ska bli bra igen... och inget snack	Sweden will be good again... and no empty words
Centre Party	För Sveriges bästa	For the good of Sweden
Left Party	Andra lovar, vi agerar	Others promise, we act
Christian Democrats	Redo att göra Sverige tryggare	Ready to make Sweden safer
Liberals	Utan oss inget maktskifte	Without us, no change of power
Green Party	Alla ska med när Sverige ställer om	Everyone will join when Sweden transitions

=== Debates ===
2022 Swedish general election debates
Date	Time (CEST)	Organizers	Moderator	P Present I Invitee N Non-invitee								Ref.
Date	Time (CEST)	Organizers	Moderator	S	M	SD	C	V	KD	L	MP	Ref.
16 Aug	20:00	Expressen	Helena Gissén; Viktor Barth-Kron	P Magdalena Andersson	P Ulf Kristersson	P Jimmie Åkesson	P Annie Lööf	P Nooshi Dadgostar	P Ebba Busch	P Johan Pehrson	P Märta Stenevi	
17 Aug	21:00	Aftonbladet	Robert Aschberg	P Magdalena Andersson	P Ulf Kristersson	P Jimmie Åkesson	P Annie Lööf	P Nooshi Dadgostar	P Ebba Busch	P Johan Pehrson	P Märta Stenevi	
31 Aug	11:45	Sveriges Radio	Dave Russell; Kris Boswell	P Hans Dahlgren	P Tobias Billström	P Markus Wiechel	P Martin Ådahl	P Ali Esbati	P Jakob Forssmed	P Maria Nilsson	P Maria Ferm	
2 Sep	15:00	Sveriges Radio	Lasse Johansson; Katherine Zimmerman	P Magdalena Andersson	P Ulf Kristersson	P Jimmie Åkesson	P Annie Lööf	P Nooshi Dadgostar	P Ebba Busch	P Johan Pehrson	P Märta Stenevi	
7 Sep	20:00	SVT	Karin Magnusson; Fouad Youcefi	P Magdalena Andersson	P Ulf Kristersson	N	N	N	N	N	N	
8 Sep	20:00	TV4	Ann Tiberg; Jenny Strömstedt	P Magdalena Andersson	P Ulf Kristersson	P Jimmie Åkesson	P Annie Lööf	P Nooshi Dadgostar	P Ebba Busch	P Johan Pehrson	P Märta Stenevi	
9 Sep	20:00	SVT	Karin Magnusson; Fouad Youcefi	P Magdalena Andersson	P Ulf Kristersson	P Jimmie Åkesson	P Annie Lööf	P Nooshi Dadgostar	P Ebba Busch	P Johan Pehrson	P Märta Stenevi	
10 Sep	20:00	TV4	Anders Pihlblad; Jenny Strömstedt	P Magdalena Andersson	P Ulf Kristersson	N	N	N	N	N	N	

== Opinion polls ==
Local regression trend line of poll results from September 2018 to the election in September 2022. Each line corresponds to a political party.

== Results ==

Graphical summary of the election results

As of 15 September 2022, the results remained preliminary after a first tally was presented. The official results were announced about a week after the election, showing very minor changes.

Party	Votes	%	Seats	+/–
By party
Social Democrats (S)	1,964,474	30.33	107	+7
Sweden Democrats (SD)	1,330,325	20.54	73	+11
Moderate Party (M)	1,237,428	19.10	68	−2
Left Party (V)	437,050	6.75	24	−4
Centre Party (C)	434,945	6.71	24	−7
Christian Democrats (KD)	345,712	5.34	19	−3
Green Party (MP)	329,242	5.08	18	+2
Liberals (L)	298,542	4.61	16	−4
Nuance Party (PNy)	28,352	0.44	0	New
Alternative for Sweden (AfS)	16,646	0.26	0	0
Citizens' Coalition (MED)	12,882	0.20	0	0
Pirate Party (PP)	9,135	0.14	0	0
Human Rights and Democracy (MoD)	6,077	0.09	0	New
Christian Values Party (KRVP)	5,983	0.09	0	0
Knapptryckarna (Kn)	5,493	0.08	0	New
Feminist Initiative (FI)	3,157	0.05	0	0
Independent Rural Party (LPo)	2,215	0.03	0	0
Direct Democrats (DD)	1,755	0.03	0	0
Climate Alliance (KA)	1,702	0.03	0	New
Unity (ENH)	1,356	0.02	0	0
Communist Party of Sweden (SKP)	1,181	0.02	0	0
68 other parties (fewer than 1,000 votes)	4,318	0.07	–	–
Total	6,477,970	100.00	349	0
Valid votes	6,477,970	98.93		
Invalid votes	6,998	0.11		
Blank votes	62,833	0.96		
Total votes	6,547,801	100.00		
Registered voters/turnout	7,775,390	84.21		
Source: Election Authority
Graph of the party split among 349 seats.
By bloc
Kristersson's Bloc (M+SD+KD+L)	3,212,007	49.58	176	+2
Andersson's Bloc (S+MP+V+C)	3,165,711	48.87	173	−2
Others	100,252	1.55	0	0
Total	6,477,970	100.00	349	0
Valid votes	6,477,970	98.93		
Invalid votes	6,998	0.11		
Blank votes	62,833	0.96		
Total votes	6,547,801	100.00		
Registered voters/turnout	7,775,390	84.21		
Source: Election Authority

=== Voter demographics ===
Sveriges Television exit polling (VALU) suggested the following demographic breakdown based on preliminary results to the nearest integer.

Cohort	Percentage of cohort voting for										
Cohort	S	SD	M	V	C	KD	MP	L	Others	Left	Right
Total vote	30	21	19	7	7	5	5	5	1	49	50
Gender
Females	34	16	17	8	8	6	6	4	1	56	43
Males	26	25	21	6	6	5	4	5	2	42	56
Age
18–21 years old	20	22	26	10	6	5	5	5	1	41	58
22–30 years old	23	17	24	11	8	6	6	5	0	48	52
31–64 years old	30	21	19	6	6	6	5	4	3	47	50
65 years old and older	38	20	16	4	7	5	4	6	0	53	47
Work
Blue-collar workers	32	29	14	9	4	5	4	2	1	49	50
White-collar workers	32	15	21	6	8	5	6	6	1	52	47
Entrepreneurs and farmers	19	24	25	3	9	6	6	6	2	37	61
Ethnic Background
Swedish Background	29	21	20	6	7	6	5	5	1	47	52
European Background	29	21	16	8	7	5	7	5	2	51	47
Non-European Background	39	12	12	17	7	3	4	2	4	67	29
Source: Sveriges Television

Cohort	Percentage of cohort voting for									Lead
Cohort	S	SD	M	V	C	KD	MP	L	Others	Lead
Total vote	30	21	19	7	7	5	5	5	1	9
Gender
Females	35	17	17	8	7	6	5	6	1	18
Males	25	25	21	5	6	6	6	5	2	Tie
Age
18–29 years old	25	15	21	11	7	6	6	7	2	4
30–49 years old	25	22	20	8	7	6	5	5	2	3
50–64 years old	32	25	18	4	7	5	4	5	1	7
65 years old and older	40	19	17	5	5	5	4	5	1	21
Area type
Urban	26	17	22	7	8	5	6	7	2	4
Suburban	32	22	18	7	6	5	4	4	1	10
Rural	36	23	17	6	6	5	3	3	1	13
Source: Demoskop

=== By constituency ===
Constituency	Land	Turnout	Share	Votes	S	SD	M	V	C	KD	MP	L	Other	Left	Right	Majority
Constituency	Land	Turnout	Share	Votes	%	%	%	%	%	%	%	%	%	%	%	Majority
Blekinge	G	86.09	1.58	103,580	31.14	28.53	17.86	4.44	4.84	5.54	2.91	3.51	1.22	43.33	55.44	12,544
Dalarna	S	85.38	2.85	186,598	31.66	25.69	16.43	5.33	6.50	6.02	3.80	3.10	1.47	47.29	51.24	7,377
Gothenburg	G	80.71	5.30	347,101	27.65	14.66	18.48	12.85	5.86	4.37	7.92	5.85	2.35	54.28	43.36	37,877
Gotland	G	87.10	0.63	41,459	34.6	15.7	16.8	6.4	11.7	4.0	6.5	2.8	1.5	59.2	39.3	8,257
Gävleborg	N	83.46	2.79	182,587	34.7	24.1	16.2	5.9	6.2	5.1	3.5	3.0	1.2	50.3	48.4	3,491
Halland	G	86.63	3.4	221,675	28.3	22.6	22.5	4.0	7.0	6.0	3.6	4.8	1.1	42.9	55.9	28,741
Jämtland	N	84.96	1.3	85,024	36.1	20.1	14.8	5.6	9.1	5.4	5.0	2.6	1.3	55.8	42.9	10,966
Jönköping	G	85.28	3.5	229,125	29.1	23.3	18.7	4.0	7.5	9.3	3.2	3.7	1.3	43.7	55.0	25,965
Kalmar	G	86.01	2.5	161,267	31.7	24.5	17.8	4.6	6.5	7.0	3.4	3.2	1.3	46.3	52.4	9,927
Kronoberg	G	85.45	1.9	124,992	31.0	23.6	19.5	5.0	6.0	6.8	3.5	3.1	1.5	45.5	53.0	9,364
Malmö	G	77.22	3.0	192,043	29.6	16.4	17.9	12.5	5.5	3.0	7.5	4.5	3.2	55.0	41.8	25,502
Norrbotten	N	84.58	2.5	161,455	41.6	20.3	13.6	7.0	5.3	5.1	3.4	2.5	1.1	57.4	41.5	25,549
Skåne NE	G	83.92	3.1	202,890	25.2	32.2	19.5	3.9	4.9	6.2	3.0	3.8	1.3	37.1	61.6	49,858
Skåne S	G	87.32	4.0	259,333	25.4	23.4	22.1	5.0	6.6	4.8	5.5	6.2	1.2	42.5	56.3	35,918
Skåne W	G	81.89	3.0	191,655	27.3	28.8	19.8	4.6	5.0	4.7	3.5	4.5	1.8	40.5	57.8	33,196
Stockholm	S	84.04	9.4	606,751	28.1	10.7	19.1	11.7	8.5	3.2	10.0	6.9	1.9	58.3	39.9	112,381
Stockholm County	S	82.49	12.7	822,510	27.1	17.5	24.0	6.3	7.4	4.9	5.1	6.0	1.7	45.9	52.4	53,198
Södermanland	S	83.52	2.9	184,880	32.9	23.0	19.2	5.2	5.9	4.7	4.0	3.6	1.4	48.1	50.5	4,581
Uppsala	S	85.99	3.8	248,888	29.1	18.2	18.3	7.9	7.2	5.9	6.7	5.0	1.7	51.0	47.4	8,907
Värmland	S	85.20	2.8	182,231	34.6	22.8	17.0	5.0	6.3	5.8	3.6	3.7	1.0	49.6	49.4	373
Västerbotten	N	85.79	2.7	177,543	40.7	14.5	14.1	8.5	7.8	4.7	5.4	3.1	1.1	62.5	36.4	46,196
Västernorrland	N	85.16	2.5	158,721	39.4	20.7	14.0	5.7	7.4	5.4	3.4	2.7	1.2	56.0	42.8	21,000
Västmanland	S	82.95	2.6	170,749	32.0	23.7	19.1	6.1	5.4	5.0	3.2	4.2	1.3	46.7	52.0	8,931
Västra Götaland E	G	86.14	2.7	176,526	31.4	24.1	18.6	4.5	6.6	7.0	3.3	3.4	1.3	45.7	53.0	12,878
Västra Götaland N	G	84.41	2.7	173,655	31.3	25.4	17.5	5.2	5.7	6.2	3.6	3.6	1.5	45.8	52.8	12,110
Västra Götaland S	G	84.41	2.2	141,906	29.1	23.6	18.9	5.3	7.1	7.0	3.6	3.8	1.6	45.1	53.3	11,590
Västra Götaland W	G	87.56	3.8	247,863	28.0	21.2	20.5	5.7	6.4	6.3	5.2	5.4	1.3	45.3	53.4	20,019
Örebro	S	84.69	3.0	194,187	33.2	22.1	16.7	6.1	6.3	5.3	4.1	4.5	1.6	49.7	48.7	1,855
Östergötland	G	85.32	4.6	300,600	30.6	21.2	19.8	5.6	6.5	6.0	4.6	4.4	1.3	47.3	51.4	12,453
Total		84.21	100.0	6,477,794	30.3	20.5	19.1	6.8	6.7	5.3	5.1	4.6	1.5	48.8	49.5	46,296
Source: Sweden's Election Authority

=== Seat distribution ===
Constituency	S	SD	M	V	C	KD	MP	L	Left	Right	Total
Blekinge	2	2	1	0	0	0	0	0	2	3	5
Dalarna	3	3	2	1	1	1	0	0	5	6	11
Gävleborg	4	2	2	1	1	1	0	0	6	5	11
Gothenburg	5	3	3	2	1	1	2	1	10	8	18
Gotland	1	0	1	0	0	0	0	0	1	1	2
Halland	3	3	2	0	1	1	1	1	5	7	12
Jämtland	2	1	1	0	0	0	0	0	2	2	4
Jönköping	4	3	2	1	1	1	0	1	6	7	13
Kalmar	3	2	2	0	0	1	0	0	3	5	8
Kronoberg	2	2	2	0	0	0	0	0	2	4	6
Malmö	3	2	2	1	1	0	1	1	6	5	11
Norrbotten	4	2	1	1	0	0	0	0	5	3	8
Skåne NE	3	4	2	0	0	1	0	0	3	7	10
Skåne S	3	3	3	1	1	1	1	1	6	8	14
Skåne W	3	3	2	0	1	0	0	1	4	6	10
Södermanland	4	2	2	1	1	0	1	0	7	4	11
Stockholm	9	4	6	4	3	1	4	3	20	14	34
Stockholm County	11	8	10	3	3	2	3	3	20	23	43
Uppsala	4	2	2	1	1	1	1	1	7	6	13
Värmland	4	2	2	1	1	1	0	0	6	5	11
Västerbotten	4	1	1	1	1	0	1	0	7	2	9
Västernorrland	4	2	1	1	1	0	0	0	6	3	9
Västmanland	3	2	2	1	0	0	0	0	4	4	8
Västra Götaland E	3	2	2	0	1	1	0	0	4	5	9
Västra Götaland N	3	2	2	0	0	1	0	0	3	5	8
Västra Götaland S	2	2	2	0	1	1	0	0	3	5	8
Västra Götaland W	3	3	3	1	1	1	1	1	6	8	14
Örebro	3	2	2	1	1	1	1	1	6	6	12
Östergötland	5	4	3	1	1	1	1	1	8	9	17
Total	107	73	68	24	24	19	18	16	173	176	349
Source: Sweden's Election Authority

=== Maps ===
Map of the 2022 Swedish general election shaded by party strength

Map of the 2022 Swedish general election shaded by coalition strength

Coalition results, red (S, V, C, MP) to blue (SD, M, KD, L), shaded by strength

Largest bloc in each electoral district

Largest party in each electoral district

== Aftermath ==
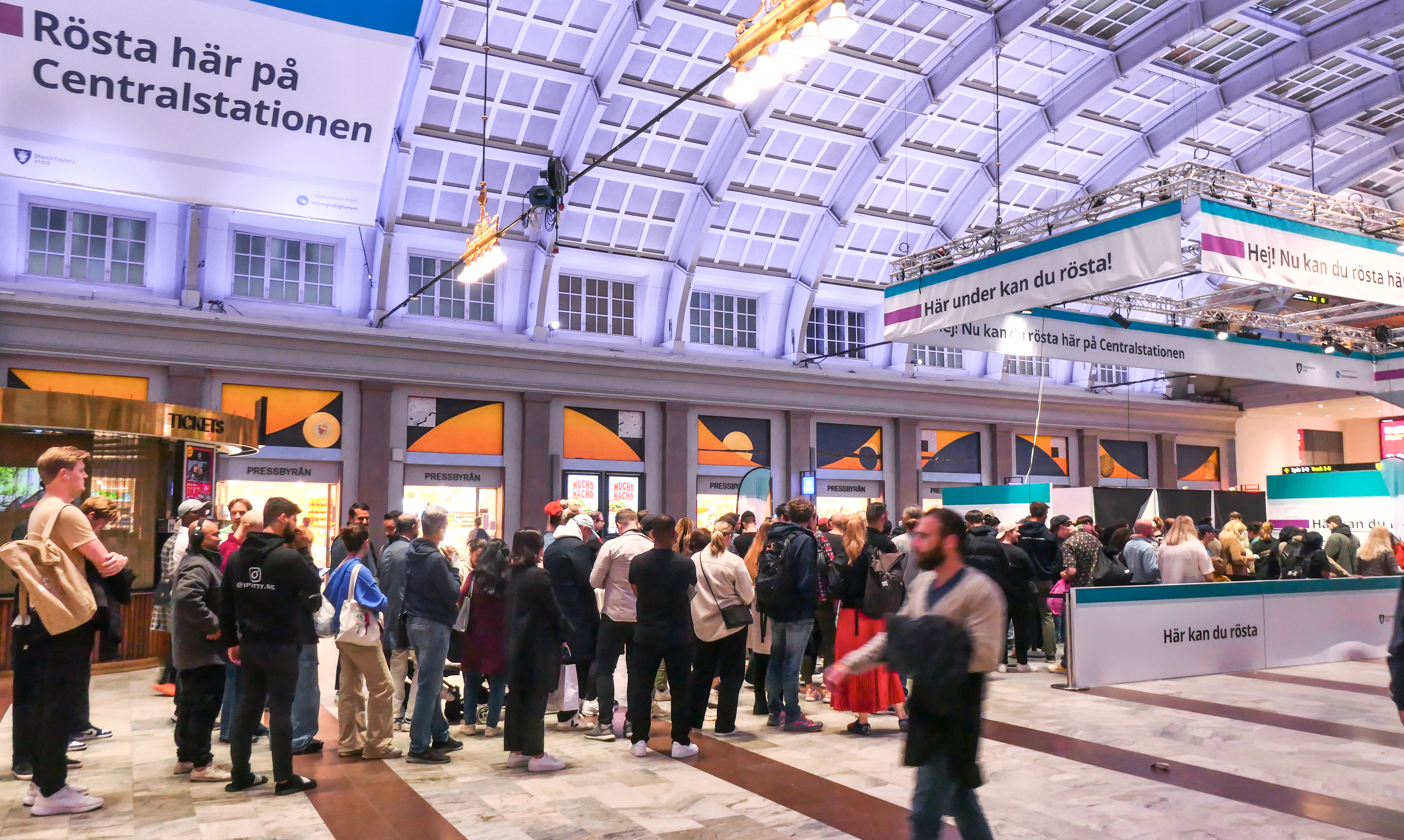
Hundreds queue to vote at Stockholm Central Station, 35 minutes before closing time, on election day, 11 September 2022

Voting stations were opened from 08:00 (CEST) to 20:00, and there were 7,772,120 Swedish nationals in total that had the right to vote in the 2022 general election. According to exit polls that were published by Sveriges Television and TV4, the bloc around the Swedish Social Democratic Party (S) showed a tight lead against the bloc around the Moderate Party (M). It was also reported that the Sweden Democrats (SD) surpassed M in the number of votes, and suggested that it could become the second-largest parliamentary party. S also won more votes in comparison with the 2018 Swedish general election.

Sweden's Election Authority stated that the bloc that composed of M, SD, Christian Democrats (KD), and Liberals (L) overtook the bloc around S by one to three seats during the counting of the preliminary results. The gap between the two blocs was around 50,000 votes. Ulf Kristersson, the M leader, stated that "the results would be likely known by Wednesday" and he thanked his voters, while Jimmie Åkesson, the SD leader, stated that SD would play a "central role" in the power shift. Kristersson also said that a change in the numbers of seats is possible. As overseas and some postal votes were to be counted, the incumbent prime minister Magdalena Andersson stated that "it is too close to call the election". Some analysts have seen the rise of the Nuance Party, mainly aimed at the country's Muslim population, as one of the causes of the losses in the left bloc.

SD's election night vigil in Stockholm attracted controversy after the party refused to grant access to several foreign language media and after the party's chief of staff Linus Bylund joked that he was looking forward to "journalist rugby", where "you push journalists around". The election vigil also attracted controversy after SD politician Rebecka Fallenkvist proclaimed "Helg Seger" while raising her arm in an interview with far-right blog Samnytt, which is phonetically similar to "Hell Seger", the Swedish translation of the Nazi "Sieg Heil" chant. Fallenkvist subsequently told Expressen that she had aimed to provoke the media into overinterpretations before later telling Dagens Nyheter that she had misspoke and meant to say "segerhelg", which would translate to "victory weekend". In late October, an SD candidate who had been elected to the Nynäshamn City Council resigned as a councillor after a media investigation found that she had been an active member of the neo-Nazi Nordic Resistance Movement for two decades.

On 13 September Annie Lööf, the leader of the Centre Party (C), sent an internal email to the party's elected politicians in which she called the results for the party "very disappointing" and stated that C's board would conduct an investigation into the party's campaign. Two days later, Lööf announced her resignation as party leader. Andersson conceded on 14 September, and announced her resignation as prime minister, paving the way for Kristersson to attempt to form a new government. Andersson called upon M, KD, and L to reject SD, and said she was open to a government with M that would exclude SD. Some Liberals in particular have been wary of a government with SD. Renew Europe, the European parliamentary group of which L is part, has been critical of the Liberals being part of a government including SD.

Despite the right-wing majority, no government had been formed by the opening of the newly elected Riksdag on 26 September. Moderate Party leaders raised concerns that SD would hold a disproportionate amount of influence over a new government, and would use the committee chairmanships allocated to them to block or delay government policy. On 26 September Andreas Norlén of the Moderate Party was re-elected as Speaker of the Riksdag by acclamation. The election of Julia Kronlid of the Sweden Democrats as Second Deputy Speaker of the Riksdag required a second ballot after the first ballot fell three votes short of the required majority.

=== Government formation ===
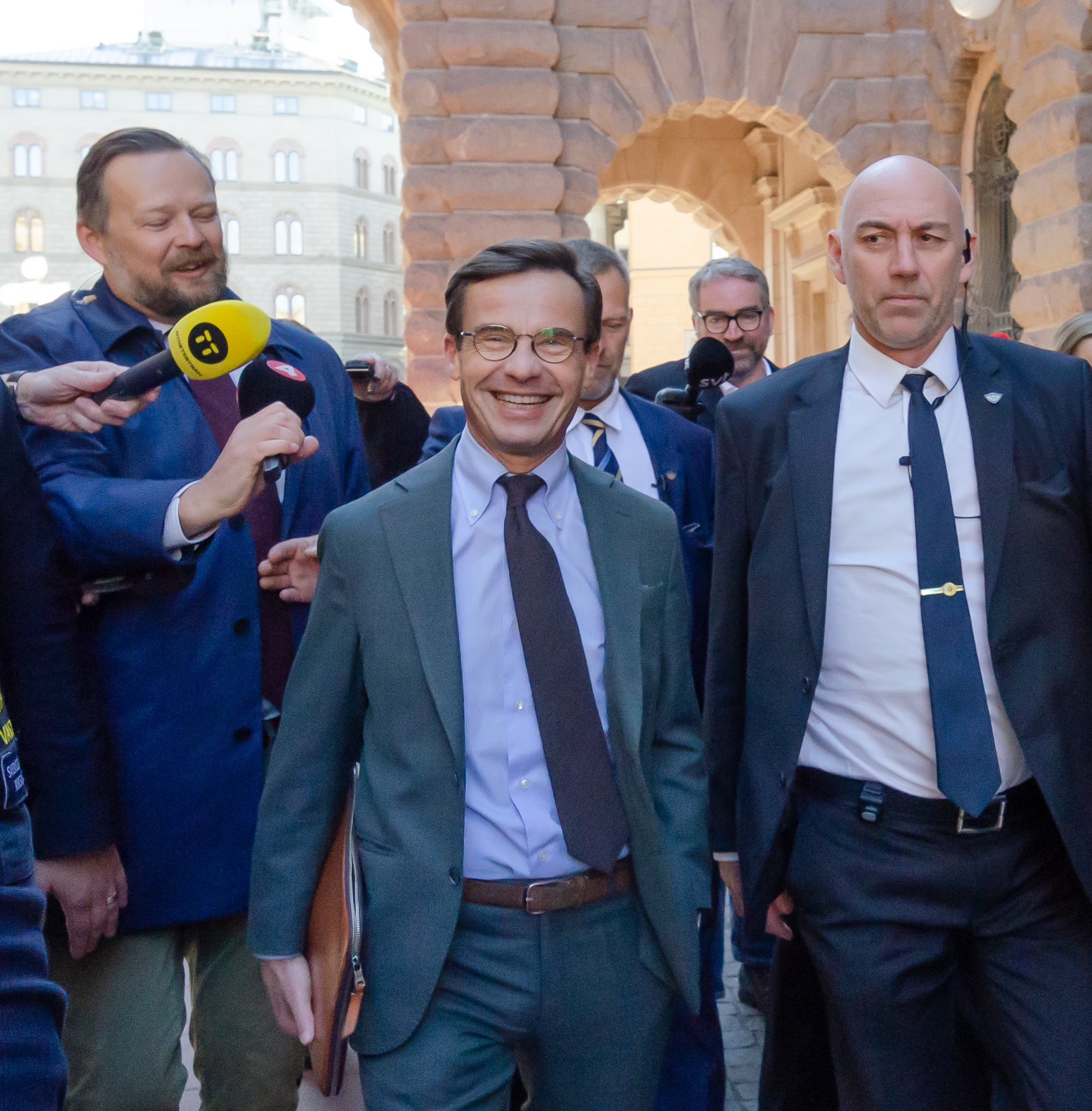
Kristersson on his way to the Speaker, October 2022

On 19 September, Speaker Andreas Norlén, after talks with representatives of the Riksdag parties and a discussion with the Deputy Speakers, tasked Ulf Kristersson of the Moderate Party (M) with probing the conditions for forming a government. On 12 October, Kristersson reported to the speaker and requested two more days to get his government documents together. On 14 October, Kristersson announced to the Speaker of the Riksdag that he was ready to form a government with the Christian Democrats (KD) and the Liberals (L), with the support of the Sweden Democrats (SD). The four parties' written agreement with Kristersson as Prime Minister for the 2022–2026 term is called the Tidö Agreement. With the agreement, named after the place where it was negotiated, this is the first time SD have formalised influence over a government's policy.

On 17 October, the Riksdag voted 176 to 173 in favour of Kristersson becoming prime minister under the four parties' agreement. As a government, M, KD, and L together have fewer seats than the Swedish Social Democratic Party (S) and must rely on SD for every vote. This means that M, KD, and L are part of a minority government, while SD gets civil servants in the government office (despite internal opposition from L, the more vocal anti-SD party within the right-wing bloc, and it being one of the red lines the party had drawn prior to the election) and gives external support through confidence and supply to assure the Kristersson-led government of its absolute majority. It is the first time SD will hold direct government influence. Two European Union lawmakers, one from the Left Party, criticised the centre-right and M in particular, as a member of the European People's Party, for allying with the far right, as did opposition leaders led by S.

Investiture Ulf Kristersson (Moderate Party)
Ballot	17 October 2022	
Required majority	175 (including abstentions) out of 349	
Votes	Yes: SD (73); M (68); KD (19); L (16)	176 / 349
Votes	No: S (107); C (24); V (24); MP (18)	173 / 349
Votes	Abstentions	0 / 349
Votes	Absentees	0 / 349
Result	Yes	

== See also ==
- List of members of the Riksdag, 2022–2026
- Basic Laws of Sweden
- Cordon sanitaire in Sweden
- County councils of Sweden
- History of Sweden (1991–present)
- Municipalities in Sweden
- Politics of Sweden
