= Swedish Work Environment Authority =

- Arbetsmiljöverket (AV)
- The coat of arms of the Swedish Work Environment Authority

Agency overview
- Formed: 2001
- Preceding agencies: Regional Labour Inspectorate districts, The National Board of Occupational Safety and Health
- Jurisdiction: Government of Sweden
- Headquarters: Lindhagensgatan 133; Stockholm
- Employees: 555 (2013)
- Annual budget: SEK 505M (2013)
- Minister responsible: Mats Persson, (Ministry of Employment)
- Agency executive: Lars Lööw, (Director-General)
- Parent agency: Ministry of Employment
- Key document: Regleringsbrev
- Website: av.se

The Swedish Work Environment Authority (SWEA; Swedish: Arbetsmiljöverket, AV) is a Swedish administrative authority sorting under the Ministry of Employment, responsible for issues relating to the working environment and work injury statistics. It is led by Director General Lars Lööw since 2024.

== Task ==
The agency is tasked by the Government with issuing regulations, should spread information and furnish advice on occupational safety and health (OSH), and the relating labour laws, in particular the Work Environment Act (AML). This is primarily done with the Work Environment Authority's Statute Book (AFS), which contains provisions and general recommendations specifying the requirements to be met by the work environment.

The agency also publishes other books, brochures, reports and should promote collaboration between parties on the labour market, on issues relating to OSH. Furthermore, the agency has a supervisory role for the compliance of the occupational health legislation, the Working Hours Act (SFS 1982:673) and, in certain aspects, the Tobacco Act (SFS 1993:581) and the Environmental Code (SFS 1998:808). This is usually done with inspections, and for this purpose, the agency has the right to issue stipulations and injunctions to any non-compliant employer.

== See also ==
- European Agency for Safety and Health at Work
- International Labour Organization
- Occupational safety and health
