= Erik Ullenhag =

Swedish politician and diplomat

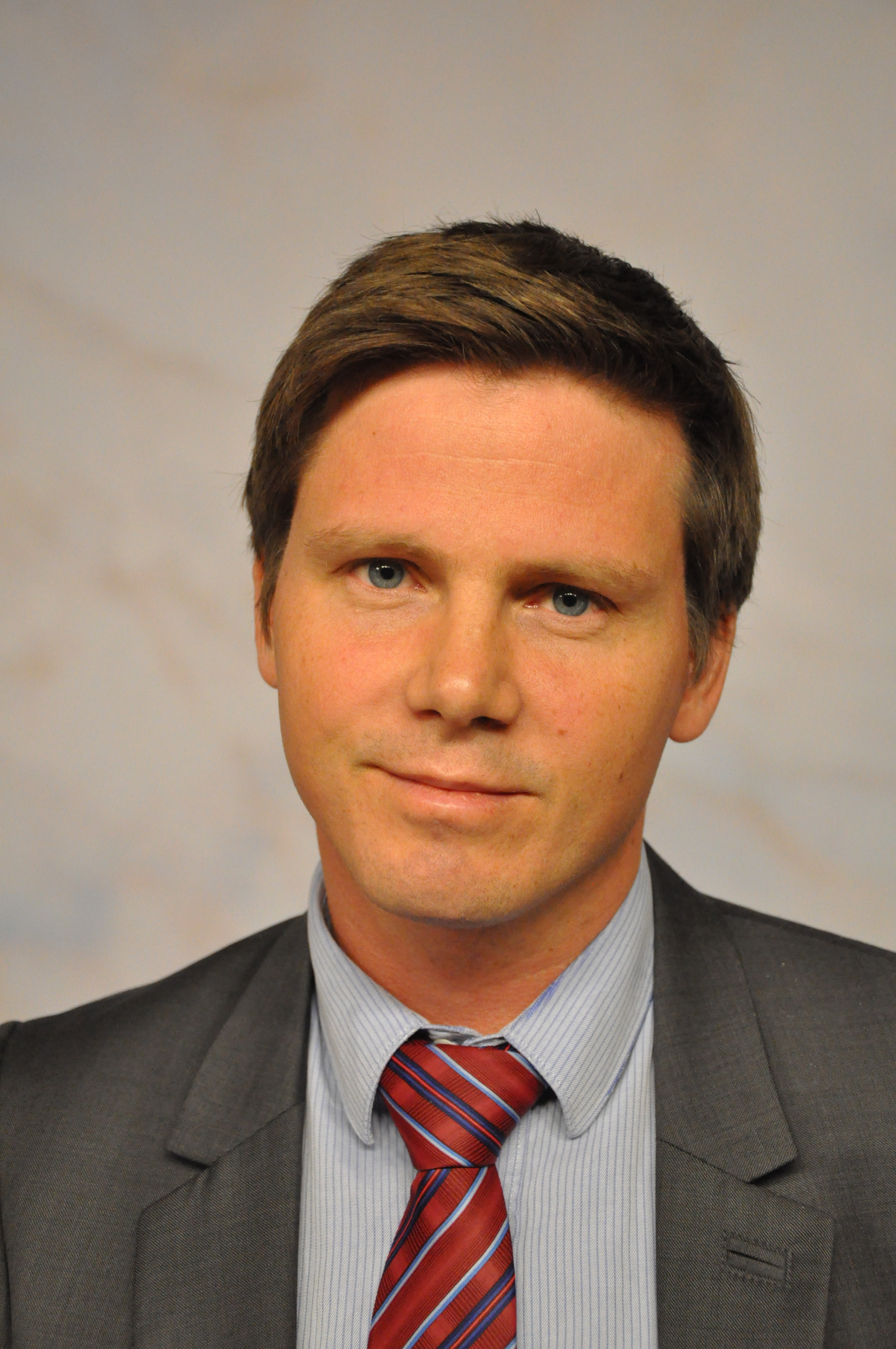
- Erik Ullenhag in 2011.

Ambassador of Sweden to Israel
- In office 1 September 2020 – 2024
- Preceded by: Magnus Hellgren
- Succeeded by: Alexandra Rydmark

Ambassador of Sweden to Jordan
- In office 1 September 2016 – 31 August 2020
- Preceded by: Helena Gröndahl Rietz
- Succeeded by: Alexandra Rydmark

Leader of the Liberals in the Riksdag
- In office 3 October 2014 – 7 June 2016
- Leader: Jan Björklund
- Preceded by: Johan Pehrson
- Succeeded by: Christer Nylander

Minister for Integration
- In office 5 October 2010 – 3 October 2014
- Prime Minister: Fredrik Reinfeldt
- Preceded by: Nyamko Sabuni
- Succeeded by: Office abolished

Member of the Swedish Riksdag
- In office 3 October 2014 – 2016
- Constituency: Stockholm County
- In office 14 July 2009 – 5 October 2010
- Constituency: Stockholm County
- In office 30 September 2002 – 2 October 2006
- Constituency: Stockholm County

Leader of the Liberal Youth of Sweden
- In office 1999–2002
- Preceded by: Karin Karlsbro
- Succeeded by: Birgitta Ohlsson

Personal details
- Born: 20 July 1972 (age 54) Uppsala, Sweden
- Party: Liberals
- Education: Uppsala University
- Profession: Jurist
- Website: www.folkpartiet.se/ullenhag

Erik Jörgen Carl Ullenhag (born 20 July 1972, in Uppsala) is a Swedish politician and diplomat who is currently serving as Consul General of Sweden to New York City since 2024.

Ullenhag served as Minister for Integration from 2010 to 2014 and was party secretary for the Liberal People's Party from 2006 to 2010 and parliamentary group leader of his party in the Riksdag from 2014 to 2016. He was Ambassador of the Kingdom of Sweden to the Hashemite Kingdom of Jordan from 2016 to 2020.

Erik Ullenhag is the son of politician Jörgen Ullenhag.

Party political offices
Preceded by Karin Karlsbro	Chairman of the Liberal Youth of Sweden; 1997–1999	Succeeded by Birgitta Ohlsson
Preceded by Helena Dyrssen	Secretary for the Liberal People's Party; 2006–2010	Succeeded by Nina Larsson
Preceded by Johan Pehrson	Leader of the Liberals in the Riksdag; 2014–2016	Succeeded by Christer Nylander
Political offices
Preceded by Nyamko Sabuni	Minister for Integration; 2010–2014	Succeeded by Anders Ygeman (2021)
Diplomatic posts
Preceded by Helena Gröndahl Rietz	Ambassador of Sweden to Jordan; 2016–2020	Succeeded by Alexandra Rydmark
Preceded by Magnus Hellgren	Ambassador of Sweden to Israel; 2020–2024	Succeeded by Alexandra Rydmark
Preceded by Camilla Mellander	Consul General of Sweden to New York City; 2024–present	Succeeded by Incumbent
