= Johan Pehrson =

Swedish politician (born 1968)

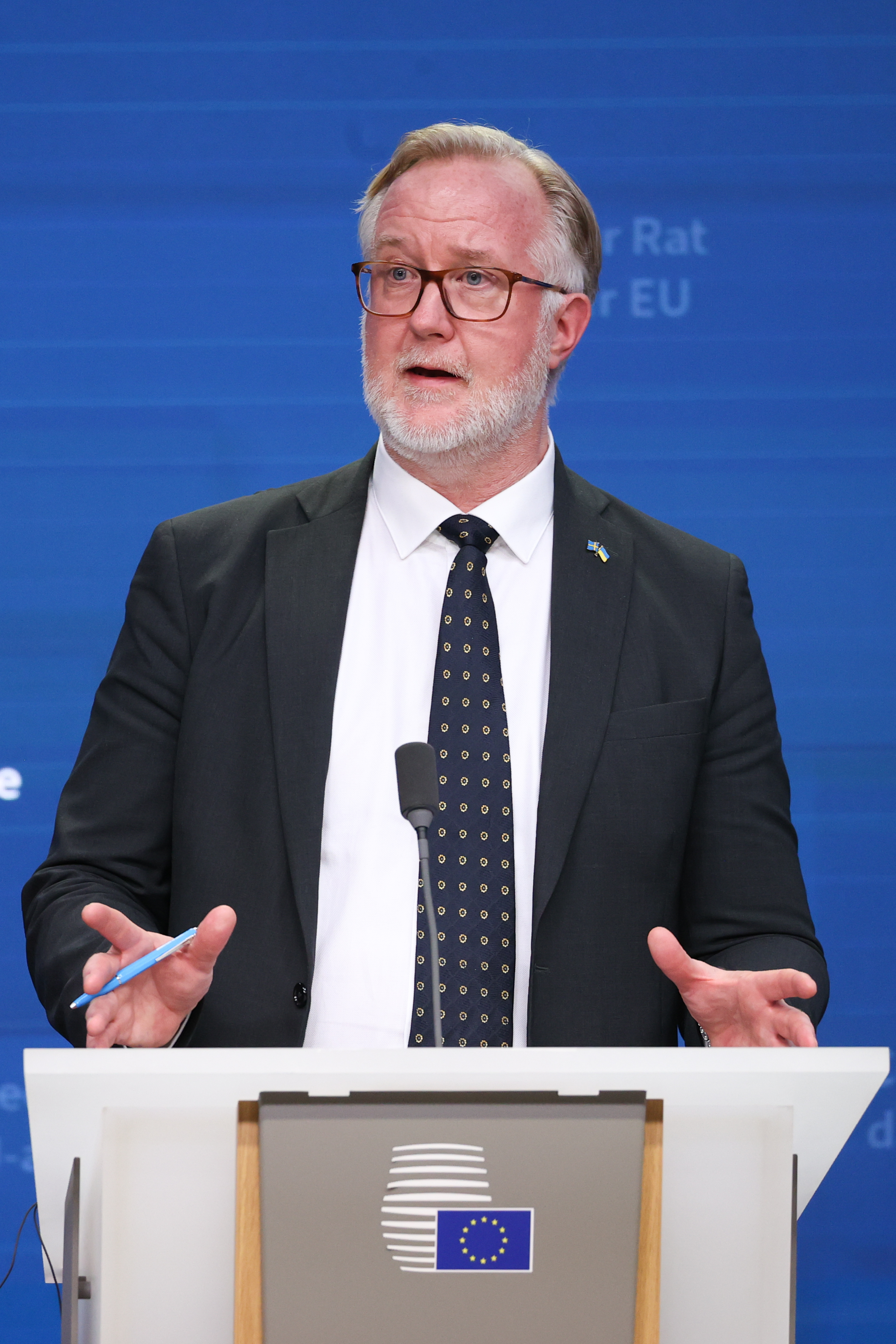
- Pehrson in 2023

Minister for Education
- In office 10 September 2024 – 28 June 2025
- Monarch: Carl XVI Gustaf
- Prime Minister: Ulf Kristersson
- Preceded by: Mats Persson
- Succeeded by: Simona Mohamsson

Minister for Employment and Integration
- In office 18 October 2022 – 10 September 2024
- Prime Minister: Ulf Kristersson
- Preceded by: Eva Nordmark (Employment); Anders Ygeman (Integration)
- Succeeded by: Mats Persson

Leader of the Liberals
- In office 8 April 2022 – 24 June 2025
- Preceded by: Nyamko Sabuni
- Succeeded by: Simona Mohamsson

Leader of the Liberals in the Riksdag
- In office 28 June 2019 – 8 April 2022
- Leader: Nyamko Sabuni
- Preceded by: Christer Nylander
- Succeeded by: Mats Persson
- In office 11 October 2006 – 28 September 2014
- Leader: Lars Leijonborg; Jan Björklund
- Preceded by: Anna Grönlund Krantz
- Succeeded by: Erik Ullenhag

Member of the Riksdag
- In office 24 September 2018 – 27 June 2025
- Constituency: Örebro County
- In office 5 October 1998 – 19 April 2015
- Constituency: Örebro County

Personal details
- Born: Carl Johan Georg Pehrson; 8 May 1968 (age 58) Örebro, Sweden
- Party: Liberals
- Spouse: Marie Brodin (m. 2025)
- Children: 4
- Education: Uppsala University (LL.M.)

Carl Johan Georg Pehrson (born 8 May 1968) is a Swedish politician who served as leader of the Liberals Party from 2022 to 2025, as Minister for Employment and Integration from 2022 to 2024 and as Minister for Education from 2024 to 2025.

Pehrson was Member of Parliament from 1998 to 2015 and from 2018 to 2025, representing Örebro County both times.

== Biography ==
=== Early life and career ===
Pehrson was born in Längbro in Örebro County. He has a Master of Laws degree from Uppsala University. He became a member of the Liberal People's Party in 1985 with a previous background from the Liberal Youth of Sweden. Before being elected to the parliament in 1998, Pehrson worked as a court clerk at the Örebro district court. From 2001 to 2002 Pehrson was Party Secretary of the Liberal People's Party.

=== Leader of the Liberals (2022–2025) ===
On 8 April 2022, Nyamko Sabuni resigned as party leader. On the same day, the Liberals announced that Pehrson, as the first deputy chairman, would take over as acting party leader. He led the Liberals over the 2022 Swedish general election. At an extraordinary party meeting in December, Pehrson was elected as party leader on a permanent basis.

Following the election the Liberals joined a coalition government with the Moderates and Christian Democrats, with Pehrson becoming Minister for Employment and Integration in the Kristersson Cabinet.

In August 2024, Pehrson's Ministry of Employment reported the highest number of unemployed for the past decade, excluding the years of the COVID-19 pandemic.

On 10 September 2024, Kristersson reshuffled his cabinet during his Declaration of Government speech held at the Opening of the Riksdag. During this reshuffle Pehrson was appointed Minister for Education and was replaced as Minister for Employment and Integration by Education Minister Mats Persson. As Minister of Education, Pehrson has stated that he is paying attention to a 2024 law passed by Australia that restricts minors' social media usage.

On 28 April 2025, Pehrson announced his resignation as leader of the Liberals. His decision was announced weeks following the resignations of several top-level Liberal politicians on 31 March. Pehrson was succeeded as party leader by Simona Mohamsson on 24 June, who also took over as minister four days later.

== Personal life ==
Johan Pehrson 2012

Pehrson lives in Örebro with his wife and four children.

Party political offices
Preceded by Nyamko Sabuni	Leader of the Liberals Party; 2022–2025	Succeeded by Simona Mohamsson
Political offices
Preceded by Eva Nordmark	Minister for Employment; 2022–2024	Succeeded by Mats Persson
Preceded by Anders Ygeman	Minister for Integration; 2022–2024	Succeeded by Mats Persson
Preceded by Mats Persson	Minister for Education; 2024–2025	Succeeded by Simona Mohamsson
Diplomatic posts
Preceded by Elisabeth Eklund	Ambassador of Sweden to Portugal; 2026–present	Succeeded by Incumbent
