= Paulina Brandberg =

Swedish politician (born 1983)

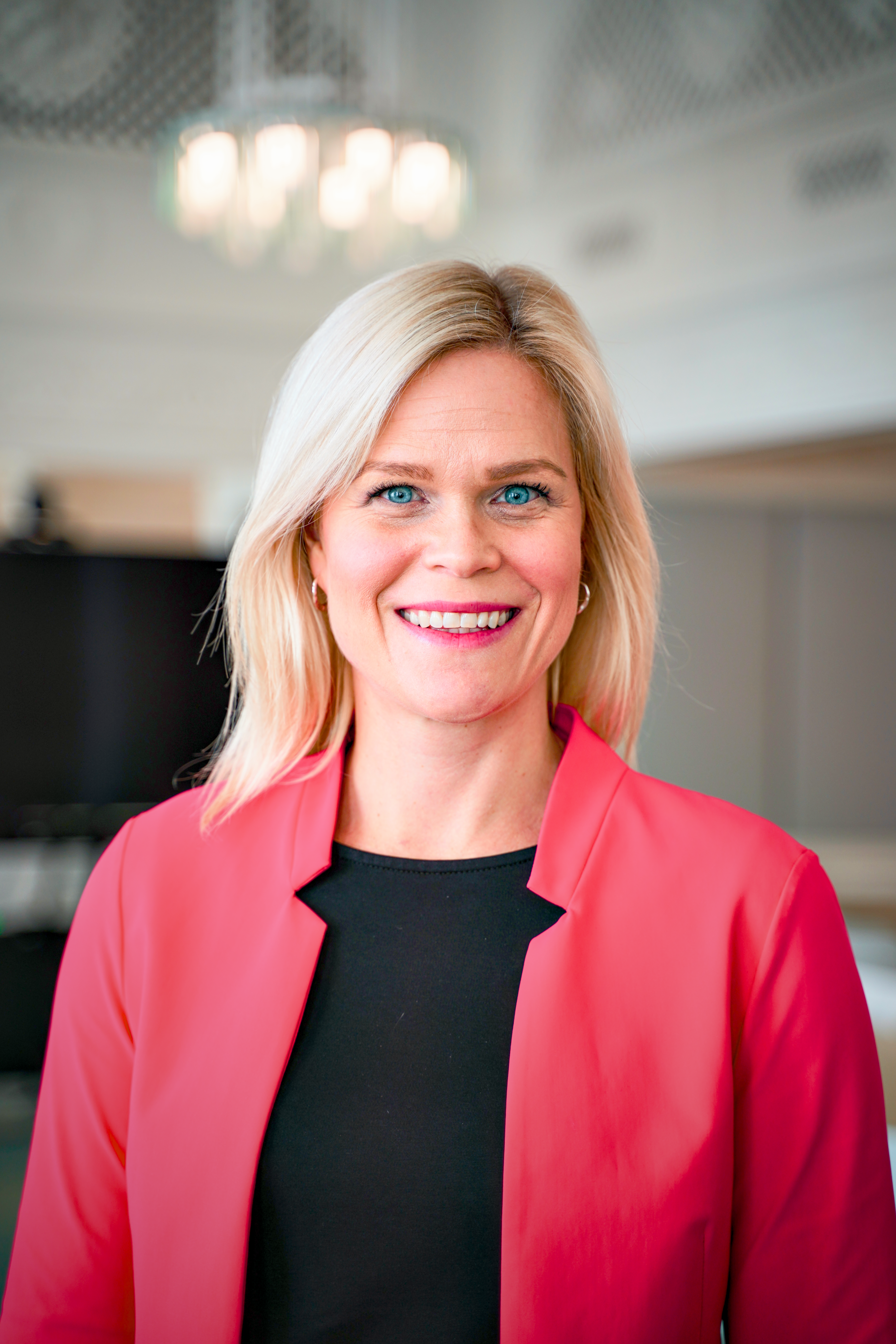
- Brandberg in 2024

Minister for Gender Equality
- In office 18 October 2022 – 1 April 2025
- Monarch: Carl XVI Gustaf
- Prime Minister: Ulf Kristersson
- Preceded by: Eva Nordmark
- Succeeded by: Nina Larsson

Personal details
- Born: Paulina Brandberg; 11 November 1983 (age 42) Lund, Sweden
- Party: Liberals
- Education: Lund University

Paulina Brandberg (born 11 November 1983) is a Swedish politician for the Liberals. She was Minister of Equality in the cabinet of Ulf Kristersson from 2022 to 2025.

== Personal life ==
In 2020, Brandberg posted on Twitter she had a phobia of bananas. Bananaphobia can trigger nausea and anxiety. In 2024, Expressen reported her colleagues must ensure any room the minister is due to visit is banana free. Swedish prime minister Ulf Kristersson said that Brandberg's phobia had not affected government work. Brandberg has said that she is getting professional help. Fellow Swedish politician Teresa Carvalho, a Social Democrat who shares the same phobia, has said "on this issue we stand united against a common enemy".
