= Nina Larsson =

Swedish politician

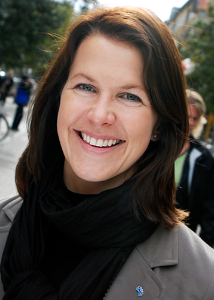
- Larsson in 2009

Minister for Gender Equality
- Incumbent
- Assumed office 1 April 2025
- Monarch: Carl XVI Gustaf
- Prime Minister: Ulf Kristersson
- Preceded by: Paulina Brandberg

Party secretary of the Liberal People's Party
- In office 2010–2014
- Party leader: Jan Björklund
- Preceded by: Erik Ullenhag
- Succeeded by: Maria Arnholm

Member of the Riksdag
- In office 2006–2014
- Constituency: Värmland County

Personal details
- Born: 28 September 1976 (age 49) Trollhättan, Sweden
- Party: Liberal People's Party
- Occupation: Politician; Military officer

Nina Larsson (born 28 September 1976) is a Swedish Liberal People's Party politician. She was a member of the Riksdag from 2006 to 2014 and party secretary of her party from 2010 to 2014.

She has been the Minister of Equality in the cabinet of Ulf Kristersson since 1 April 2025.
