= Jack Latham =

British documentary photographer (born 1989)

Jack Latham (born 1989) is a British documentary photographer. His books include A Pink Flamingo (2015), made along the route of the Oregon Trail in the USA at a time of national financial hardship; and Sugar Paper Theories (2016) about the Guðmundur and Geirfinnur case in Iceland—a case of memory distrust syndrome in which six people confessed to murders they did not commit.

In 2015 Latham was awarded the Bar-Tur Photobook Award, funding the production of Sugar Paper Theories, a solo exhibition of which was held at Reykjavík Museum of Photography in Iceland. In 2019 he won the British Journal of Photography International Photography Award for the series Parliament of Owls.

== Life and work ==
Latham was born in Cardiff, Wales. He studied documentary photography at University of Wales, Newport.

=== A Pink Flamingo ===
A Pink Flamingo (2015) "constitutes an exploration of the aspiration of the American Dream from an outsider's perspective". Beginning in 2012, in a time of economic hardship after the 2008 financial crisis and the 2010 United States foreclosure crisis, Latham retraced the Oregon Trail in the USA. The Trail is a 2,170-mile (3,490 km) historic East–West, large-wheeled wagon route and emigrant trail, "travelled by thousands of migrants from the 1830s to 1860s to find financial success on the West Coast." A Pink Flamingo's portraits, landscapes and still life photographs, were made with a large format view camera against this historic backdrop, during several trips of up to a month, over nearly three years. Latham has said "I was interested in this idea of travelling west as a metaphor for the hope that things will get better."

The title refers to the plastic flamingo designed in 1957 by Don Featherstone, "gloriously kitsch and garishly pink, the garden ornament fast became an icon of Americana."

=== Sugar Paper Theories ===
Sugar Paper Theories (2016) is about the Guðmundur and Geirfinnur case in Iceland, a case of memory distrust syndrome. Six people were convicted of the alleged murders of two men on the basis of confessions extracted by the police after intense interrogations and lengthy periods of solitary confinement, despite the lack of bodies, witnesses or any forensic evidence.

Latham's book, published in 2016, is made up of new photographs, archival imagery and text. His portraits, landscapes, and still life photographs of evidence and materials were taken between 2014 and June 2016. The text is an account of the case written by Gísli Guðjónsson, Icelandic Professor of forensic psychology at the Institute of Psychiatry, Psychology and Neuroscience of King's College London. Excerpts from the diaries of Guðjón Skarphéðinsson are also included.

Latham "says he likes exploring the grey area between truth and fiction, photojournalism and conceptual art"; "for me, Sugar Paper Theories was an attempt of telling a very complicated case about false memories in a way that reflected the notions of memory. ... The ultimate goal was to make more people outside of Iceland aware of the case".

At the time Latham made his book, many Icelanders believed there had been a miscarriage of justice. In February 2017, the state concluded that the cases of the five men should be reheard by the Supreme Court of Iceland. In February 2018, the State Prosecutor requested that the Supreme Court acquit all six, and in September 2018 it acquitted the five men but not the woman.

=== Parliament of Owls ===
Latham's series Parliament of Owls is concerned with a private men's club, the Bohemian Club, and its annual two-week-long camp at Bohemian Grove in Monte Rio, California.

== Publications ==
=== Publications by Latham ===
- A Pink Flamingo. Self-published / Dive Bar, 2015. ISBN 978-0-9933591-0-1. With a foreword by Dai George.
- Sugar Paper Theories. London: Here; The Photographers' Gallery, 2016. Photographs by Latham, text by Gísli Guðjónsson. ISBN 978-0-9935853-2-6. Includes excerpts from the diary of Guðjón Skarphéðinsson.
- Beggar's Honey. London: Here; Vevey, Switzerland: Images Vevey, 2023. With text by Shawn Sobers. Edition of 750 copies.

=== Zines by Latham ===
- Space Cowboy. Self-published, 2015. With a poem by Sofia Smith.
- The Saints. Valongo: Valongo Festival Internacional, 2017.

=== Publications with contributions by Latham ===
- The Renaissance Photography Prize 2013. London: Wapping Project Bankside, 2013.
- Common Ground. Document Scotland, 2014. Includes work by each Document Scotland member as well as by members of Welsh photography collective A Fine Beginning, including Latham.
- Taylor Wessing Photographic Portrait Prize 15. London: National Portrait Gallery, 2015. ISBN 978-1-85514-551-1.
- Flash Forward 2016: Emerging Photographers from Canada, the United Kingdom & the United States. 2016. ISBN 978-1-926856-09-4.

== Awards ==
- 2015: Selected, Taylor Wessing Photographic Portrait Prize, National Portrait Gallery, London for "Polish Docker, Keflavik Harbour, 2014", from Sugar Paper Theories
- 2015: Bar-Tur Photobook Award, The Photographers' Gallery, London. A prize of £20,000 to produce the book Sugar Paper Theories.
- 2017: Sugar Paper Theories was 1 of 33 selected, Kassel Photobook Award
- 2018: BPF18 Worthing Artist Residency, Brighton Photo Fringe, Worthing
- 2019: Winner, British Journal of Photography International Photography Award, for the series Parliament of Owls
- 2019: One of four runners-up, Aperture Portfolio Prize, for the series Parliament of Owls

== Exhibitions ==
=== Solo exhibitions ===
- A Pink Flamingo, Tilt & Shift, Llanrwst, Wales, February–March 2016.
- Sugar Paper Theories, Reykjavík Museum of Photography, Reykjavík, Iceland, September 2017 – January 2018.

=== Group exhibitions or exhibitions during festivals ===
- Common Ground: New Documentary Photography from Scotland & Wales, Street Level Photoworks, Glasgow, August–October 2014; Wales Millennium Centre, Cardiff, February–April 2016. Work by collectives A Fine Beginning and Document Scotland.
- A Pink Flamingo, Diffusion: Cardiff International Festival of Photography, Stadium Plaza, Cardiff, Wales, October 2015. Organised by Ffotogallery.
- Sugar Paper Theories, Guernsey Photo Festival, Guernsey Photo Festival Exhibition Centre, Saint Peter Port, Guernsey, Channel Islands, September 2016.
- Artist in residence exhibition, Brighton Photo Fringe, Colonnade House, Worthing, UK, October 2018.
