= List of governors of Kronoberg County =

Governor of Kronoberg County
- Landshövding i Kronobergs län
- Coat of arms of Kronoberg County.

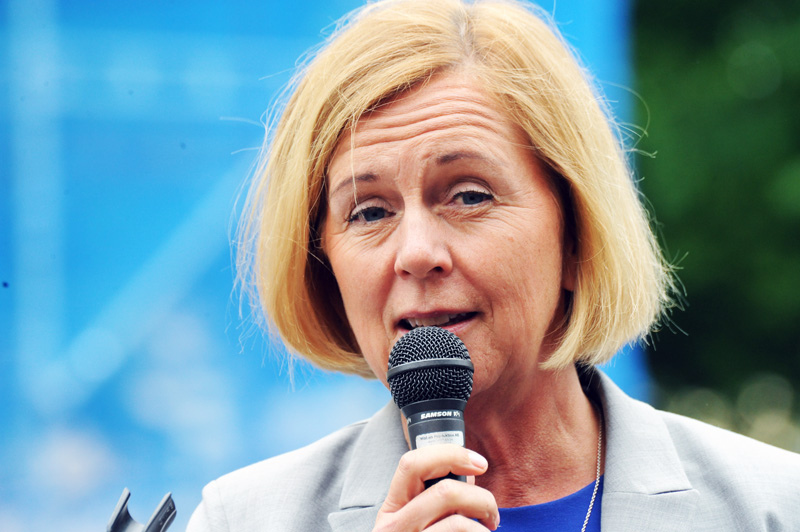
- Incumbent; Maria Arnholm since 1 February 2020
- Kronoberg County Administrative Board
- Residence: The residence in Växjö, Växjö
- Appointer: Government of Sweden
- Term length: Six years (Note: The governor is often appointed for a six-year mandate. It can be extended if the person has not reached retirement age.)
- Formation: 1634
- First holder: Bengt Kafle
- Deputy: County Director (Länsrådet)
- Salary: SEK 97,800/month (2017)
- Website: Governor and County Director

This is a list of governors for Kronoberg County of Sweden, from 1634–to present.

1. Bengt Kafle (1634–1636)
2. Bengt Bagge av Berga (1636–1653)
3. Mauritz Holst (1653–1654)
4. Gabriel Gyllenankar (1655–1657)
5. Mauritz Posse (1657–1664)
6. Jakob Flemming (1674–1676)
7. Gustaf Lilliecrona (1676–1679)
8. Jonas Klingstedt (1687–1687)
9. Åke Ulfsparre (1687–1701)
10. Gustaf von Fatzburg (1701–1710)
11. Axel Banér (1710–1718)
12. Olof Törnflycht (1718–1719)
13. Jakob Cronstedt (1719–1727)
14. Johan Brauner (1727–1729)
15. Anders Koskull (1729–1746)
16. Gustaf Henrik Rothlieb (1747–1758)
17. Peter von Psilander (1758–1763)
18. Joakim Beck-Friis (1763–1769)
19. Adam Johan Raab (1769–1776)
20. Olof von Nackreij (1776–1782)
21. Salomon Hedenstierna (1782–1787)
22. Göran Henrik Falkenberg (1787–1793)
23. Carl Stellan Mörner (1793–1827)
24. Carl Mörner (1827–1863)
25. Carl Johan Thyselius (1863–1864)
26. Gustaf Munthe (1864–1875)
27. Gunnar Wennerberg (1875–1888)
28. Gustaf H. Spens (1888–1898)
29. Charles E. Oelreich (1898–1909)
30. Alexis Hammarström (1909–1925)
31. August Beskow (1925–1944)
32. Erik Lundh (1944–1946)
33. Thorwald Bergqvist (1946–1965)
34. Gunnar Helén (1965–1970)
35. Lars Eliasson (1971–1977)
36. Astrid Kristensson (1977–1982)
37. Britt Mogård (1983–1988)
38. Sten Wickbom (1988–1995)
39. Wiggo Komstedt (1995–2002)
40. Lars-Åke Lagrell (2002–2006)
41. Claes Sjöblom (2006–2007, acting)
42. Kristina Alsnér (2007–2016)
43. Anders Flanking (2016–2017, acting)
44. Ingrid Burman (2017–2019)
45. Kristina Zetterström (2019–2020, acting)
46. Maria Arnholm (2020– )
