= Maria Arnholm =

Swedish politician (born 1958)

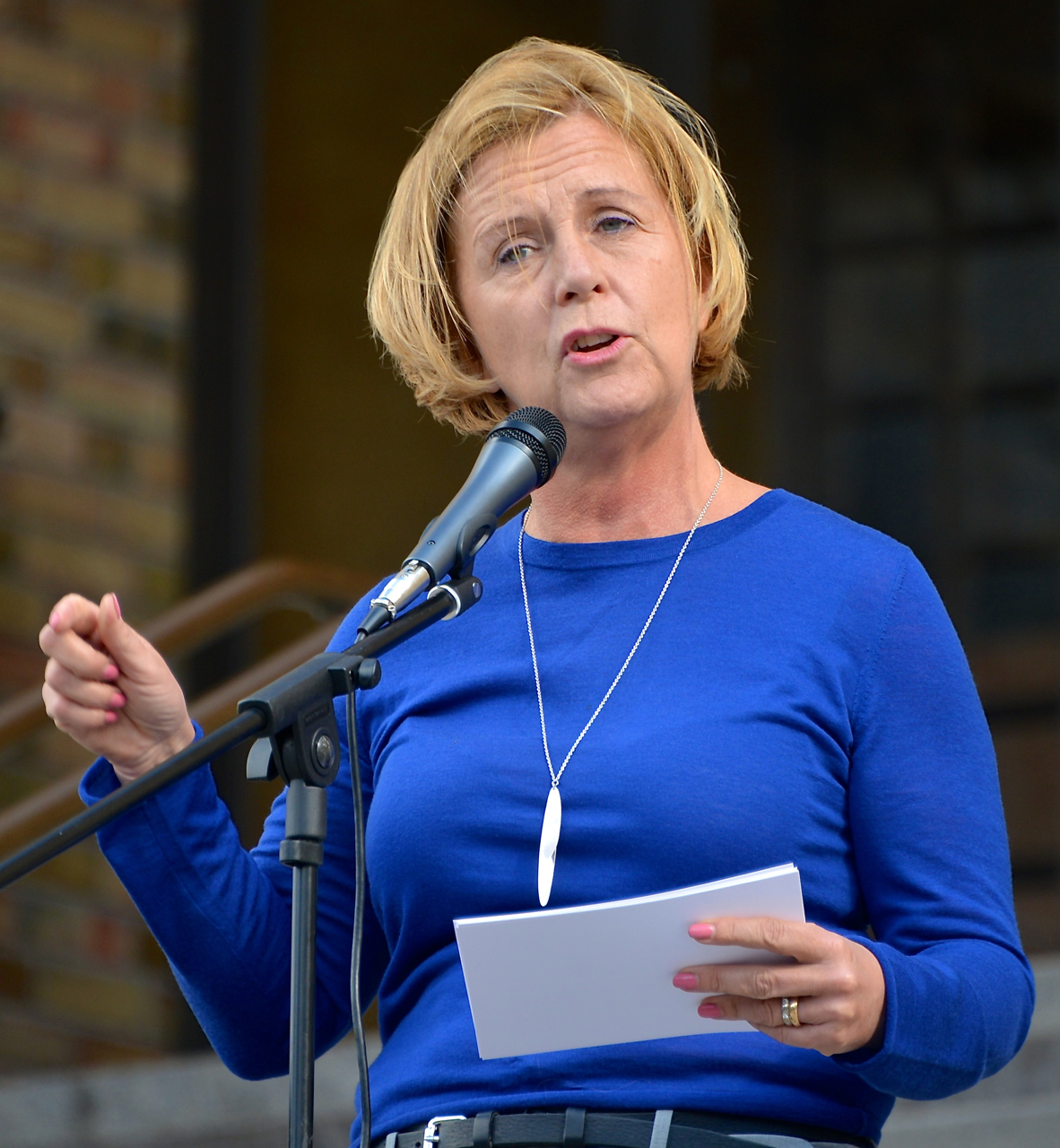

Governor of Kronoberg County
- Incumbent
- Assumed office 1 February 2020
- Appointed by: Stefan Löfven
- Preceded by: Ingrid Burman

Secretary of the Liberals
- In office 3 October 2014 – 28 June 2019
- Party leader: Jan Björklund
- Preceded by: Nina Larsson
- Succeeded by: Juno Blom

Member of the Riksdag
- In office 3 October 2014 – 31 January 2020
- Constituency: Stockholm County

Minister for Gender Equality
- In office 21 January 2013 – 3 October 2014
- Prime Minister: Fredrik Reinfeldt
- Preceded by: Nyamko Sabuni
- Succeeded by: Åsa Regnér

Personal details
- Born: 16 March 1958 (age 68) Partille, Sweden
- Party: Liberals
- Education: Stockholm University

Maria Elisabet Wallgren Arnholm (born 16 March 1958) is a Swedish politician who has served as Governor of Kronoberg County since 1 February 2020.

Arnholm served as Minister for Gender Equality and as deputy Minister for Education in the Swedish Government from 2013 to 2014 and as Party Secretary of the Liberals from October 2014 to June 2019.

== Education and career ==
Arnholm is an educated jurist, and studied at Stockholm University from 1978 to 1983. Arnholm was chief of staff to Bengt Westerberg during his tenure as Minister for Health and Social Affairs from 1991 to 1994. She went on to be communications director for Coop Norden AB from 2002 to 2006, and was CEO for PR agency Springtime from 2006 to 2012. Arnholm was appointed to become Nyamko Sabuni's State Secretary on 25 May 2012 and served in that position until 21 January 2013.

In the morning of 21 January 2013, Arnholm was appointed Minister for Gender Equality following the sudden resignation of Nyamko Sabuni. She also took office as deputy Minister for Education.

Following the 2014 defeat, Arnholm was appointed Secretary of the Liberal People's Party, now the Liberals, as the cabinet of Reinfeldt left office on 3 October 2014.

Government offices
Preceded by Nyamko Sabuni	Minister for Gender Equality; 2013–2014	Succeeded by Åsa Regnér
Preceded by Nyamko Sabuni	Deputy Minister for Education; 2013–2014	Succeeded by Helene Hellmark Knutsson
Party political offices
Preceded by Nina Larsson	Secretary of the Liberals; 2014–2019	Succeeded by Juno Blom
Civic offices
Preceded by Ingrid Burman	Governor of Kronoberg County; 2020–	Incumbent
