= Eliasson =

Eliasson or Elíasson is a surname. Notable people with the surname include:

- Ásgeir Elíasson (1949–2007), Icelandic football manager and coach
- Anders Eliasson (1947–2013), Swedish composer
- Dan Eliasson (born 1961), Former Swedish National Police Commissioner and former head of Swedish Civil Contingencies Agency
- Emma Eliasson (born 1989), Swedish ice hockey player
- Gyrðir Elíasson (born 1964), Icelandic author
- Håkan Eliasson (born 1952), Swedish mathematician
- Jan Eliasson (born 1940), Swedish diplomat and Social Democratic politician
- Lars Eliasson (1914–2002), Swedish politician
- Lena Eliasson (born 1981), Swedish orienteering and ski-orienteering competitor
- Marthe Eliasson (born 1969), Norwegian team handball player and Olympic medalist
- Mattias Eliasson (born 1975), Swedish golfer
- Niclas Eliasson (born 1995), Swedish footballer
- Nökkvi Elíasson (born 1966), Icelandic photographer
- Olafur Eliasson (born 1967), Danish-Icelandic artist known for sculptures and large-scale installation art
- Sigurlaugur Elíasson (born 1957), Icelandic artist and poet

== See also ==
- List of exhibitions by Ólafur Elíasson
