= Memory distrust syndrome =

Psychological condition

Memory distrust syndrome is a condition first described by Gísli Guðjónsson and James MacKeith in 1982, in which an individual doubts the accuracy of their memory concerning the content and context of events of which they have experienced. Since the individual does not trust their own memory, they will commonly depend on outside sources of information rather than using their ability for recollection. Some believe that this may be a defense or coping mechanism to a preexisting faulty memory state such as Alzheimer's disease, amnesia, or possibly dementia.

The condition is generally considered to be related to source amnesia, which involves the inability to recall the basis for factual knowledge. The main difference between the two is that source amnesia is a lack of knowing the basis of knowledge, whereas memory distrust syndrome is a lack of trust in the knowledge that exists. The latter implies an individual’s reason or belief that would prevent them from trusting their recollections. Cases concerning memory distrust syndrome have led to documented false confessions in court cases.

== Symptoms ==
The main symptom of memory distrust syndrome is the lack of belief in one's own memory, and, a reliance on outside sources for information as a side effect. The individual may have their own memory, but will readily change it depending on chosen outside sources. Individuals may alter their recollections when contrary information is suggested, even though their memory may be true, due to the distrust in their memory.

For example, a person has a memory of a house and recalls it to be white. Then, a trusted family member begins talking with them and suggests that it was red instead. The afflicted individual will then believe the house was red despite their recollection of it being white. It is unknown if the person's memory of the house is permanently altered; however, they will say that the house was red regardless of the memory's condition.

Also, this does not necessarily allow for confabulatory memory fabrication. Currently it is not believed that an afflicted individual will readily believe an outside source on a memory of which the person is not involved, such as a randomly shared story. This further suggests that memory distrust syndrome solely alters the individual's currently retrievable memories, and not randomized information.

== Causes ==
It is normal to have some level of memory distrust, or the lack of trusting in one's own memory. This may occur when speaking with your parents about your childhood, for example. However it seems that everyone has their own level of memory distrust, and memory distrust syndrome seems to be a severe case.

The direct cause is unknown; however, it is possibly a defense or coping mechanism to a preexisting condition that would alter one's memory. This could involve frontal lobe lesions, Alzheimer's disease, amnesia, dementia, or other conditions. Any condition that would alter either existing memories or the formation of new memories could cause a coping scheme such as memory distrust syndrome. Alternatively, an individual may have learned over time to not trust their own memory from conditioning, and as such the individual would develop a defense mechanism to remove themselves from potential abuse.

== Mechanisms ==
Not to be confused with false memory syndrome which involves the creation of memory which are factually incorrect, but strongly believed by the individual. Memory distrust syndrome (MDS) is the doubt of one's own memory surrounding the content and context of events. Because of this, individuals rely on external sources of information as opposed to assuming their recollection is correct. It would seem as though some individuals have a tendency toward memory distrust to some degree naturally; however, MDS is a form of memory distrust heightened to the point that the individual will reject their own memory completely if provided with conflicting information. It has been connected to obsessive-compulsive disorder in that repeated checking of information would result in a distrust of the individual's confidence of their memory.

The suggestibility of memory alteration provides the potential for radical mood alterations and feelings of inadequacy or futility. Typically, however, the individual will be aware of their condition and will be prepared for situations that may be difficult. A tendency to avoid memory recollection is possible due to the desire to avoid embarrassment or ridicule.

== Types of false memory ==
=== Spontaneous confabulation ===
These occur typically in cases of amnesia and frontal lobe disorders. In "spontaneous" confabulations, there is a persistent, unprovoked outpouring of false memories in which intrusion errors or distortions are seen in response to a challenge to memory. They occur most commonly during autobiographical recall, but can occur other times as well. These errors occur in one of two ways: either there is an "editing error" or there is a "source" error.

There are several ideas as to why this editing error may occur.

- an issue with the rules of plausibility and association during memory retrieval, leaving the retrieved memory to be "uninhibited" or "suppressed".
- a failure in the evaluation process of accessed memories. This is similar to Moscovitch's idea, although his focuses on one's capability of judgment while this one focuses on the judgment itself.
- spontaneous confabulation occurred due to "the completely incoherent and context-free retrieval of memories and associations.”
- a deficit in three processes (description, editing, and mediator) which all contributed to confabulations in different ways.

Source errors are focused around the creation of the original memory or the memory storage process rather than the processes discussed above. These are less studied because they involve several variables including how an individual learns and perceives their environment, the environment itself, distractions, the individual's weighing of important information, etc.

=== Delusional memories and delusions ===
These occur in psychiatric patients or individuals with psychiatric conditions. Delusional memories consist of either a true memory that gives rise to a deluded interpretation These can closely resemble spontaneous confabulations resulting from frontal lobe disease. They are also an absolute conviction and not up for debate. The individual believes the memory is completely true and accurate, and has a tendency toward being bizarre.

Similarly, delusions are a held conviction that the individual holds; however, it may not be due to a recollection of any specific event. Instead the conviction is rooted in beliefs based on related delusional memories or misconceptions. For example, an individual who has a conspiracy theory based on junk or mislabeled mail could have a delusion involving the mail and the government. However, there wouldn't necessarily be any delusional memories to support it. It is simply a belief that has been created due to unhindered perception of events.

== Diagnostic tests ==
Since the cause of memory distrust syndrome is unknown, there is no ultimate test to determine diagnosis. However, the following tests all involve memory accuracy, memory trust, and suggestibility.

=== Squire Subjective Memory Questionnaire ===
The Squire Subjective Memory Questionnaire if a self-report scale consisting of 18 items tapping subjective evaluations of one's own memory. Items are scored on a 9-point scale (−4=disastrous; 4=perfect). Sample items are 'My ability to remember things that have happened more than a year ago is...' and 'My ability to recall things when I really try is...' Scores are summed to obtain a total SSMQ score varying from −72 to 72, with negative scores corresponding with pessimistic judgments about one's own memory and positive scores reflecting optimistic memory evaluations.

=== Cognitive Failures Questionnaire ===
The Cognitive Failures Questionnaire is a self-report scale that taps failures in everyday actions, perception and attention, and memory over the last month. It consists of 25 items that are scored on a 5-point scale (0=never; 4=very often). Illustrative items are 'Do you fail to notice signposts on the road?' and 'Do you forget where you put something like a newspaper or a book?' Scores are summed to obtain a total CFQ score varying from 0 to 100, with higher scores indicating more self-reported cognitive failures.

=== Gudjonsson Compliance Scale ===
The Gudjonsson Compliance Scale is a self-report instrument that measures peoples' levels of compliance. It focuses on two types of behavior, namely eagerness to please others, and avoidance of conflicts. The scale consists of 20 items using a true/false format. Examples are 'I give in easily to people when I am pressured' and 'I try hard to do what is expected of me'. After recoding items 17 to 19, a total GCS score varying from 0 to 20 can be obtained by summing the number of true responses, with higher scores indexing more compliant behavior.

=== Gudjonsson Suggestibility Scale ===
The Gudjonsson Suggestibility Scale (GSS) is used to measure interrogative suggestibility. The GSS consists of a story that is read out loud by a test administer. Participants then have to answer 20 questions of which 15 are misleading and 5 are neutral and address factual details of the story. After participants have answered the questions, they receive negative feedback about their performance. They are asked to answer the questions one more time and to be more accurate this time. Thus, all questions are answered twice and in this way several GSS parameters can be calculated. First, yield 1 refers to the number of misleading questions that the participant accepts during the first round (range 0–15). Second, yield 2 refers to the number of misleading questions accepted during the second round (range 0–15). Third, shift refers to the number of changes that participants make in their answers after having received negative feedback (range 0–20). Finally, the total GSS score is the sum of yield 1 and shift, with higher scores reflecting higher levels of interrogative suggestibility (range 0–35).

== Society and culture ==
Memory distrust disorder has been shown to cause false confessions in court cases. This occurs when the suggestible individual is asked a question which leads them to believe that their recollection is incorrect. Due to their suggestibility and lack of trust in their own memory, they will either alter their own memory or be unsure of specific details.

A similar situation can occur while being interrogated by the authorities. The court system assumes that everyone is innocent until proven guilty; however, many times individuals are arrested for suspicion, which would simply require a motive and the lack of an alibi. The goal of an interrogator may be to increase and use a subject's suggestibility. This would cause the capability of several inaccuracies to occur during the interrogation.

Studies have been performed on undiagnosed individuals and they have shown that minor detail alterations can and do easily go unnoticed. In a specific study, individuals were asked to watch a tape of a robbery and then recall details about it. A week later they were brought back in and read over a supposed copy of their written statement. However, this statement included minor alterations such as the number of people in the store at the time or what type of headgear the thief was wearing. Sometimes this individuals would notice the alterations, but other details went unnoticed, suggesting that undiagnosed individuals have a level of memory distrust. Details had been altered that were accepted as truth, regardless of what actual memory the individual could recall.

== See also ==
- Amnesia
- Delirium
- Guðmundur and Geirfinnur case
- Huntington's disease
- Mental disorder
- Social exclusion
- Source amnesia
