= Guðjónsson =

Guðjónsson or Gudjonsson is a surname of Icelandic origin, meaning son of Guðjón. In Icelandic names, the name is not strictly a surname, but a patronymic.

Notable people with the name include:

- Bjarni Guðjónsson (born 1979), Icelandic footballer
- Eyþór Guðjónsson (born 1968), Icelandic actor
- Gísli Guðjónsson (born 1947), Icelandic forensic psychologist
- Guðjón Már Guðjónsson (born 1972), Icelandic entrepreneur and businessman
- Gudmundur Orn Gudjonsson (born 1982), Icelandic archer
- Heimir Guðjónsson (footballer, born 1937), Icelandic footballer
- Heimir Guðjónsson (footballer, born 1969), Icelandic footballer
- Joey Guðjónsson (born 1980), Icelandic footballer
- Þórður Guðjónsson (born 1973), Icelandic footballer
- Þorsteinn Guðjónsson (born 1969), Icelandic footballer
- Snorri Guðjónsson (born 1981), Icelandic handball player

== See also ==
- Gudjonsson Suggestibility Scale, a test to measure a person's susceptibility to coercive interrogation
