= Life imprisonment in Iceland =

Life imprisonment in Iceland is legal and the most severe punishment available under the Icelandic penal code since the death penalty was formally abolished in 1928. According to the General Penal Code from 1944 imprisonment may be imposed for life or for a certain period, not shorter than 30 days and not longer than 16 years. However, in special cases it is permissible to increase the punishment from 16 years to 20 years.

== General Penal Code, 19/1940 ==
Listed below are possible cases which life imprisonment may be imposed.

General Penal Code, 19/1940
Act in the General Penal Code	Crime	Sentence
Article 86 & 87	Treason	Not shorter than 2 years, or life imprisonment
Article 98	Rebelling or inciting a rebellion	No less than 3 years, or life imprisonment
Article 100	Attacking Althing in such a way to pose a threat to its independence, or issuing an order to do so, or obeying such an order	No less than 1 year, up to life imprisonment
Article 100 a	Terrorism	Up to life imprisonment
Article 193	Depriving a parent, or rightful parties of the control of or custody over a child who is a minor, or encouraging a child to evade such control or custody	Fines, imprisonment for up to 16 years, or life imprisonment
Article 211	Murder	Not less than 5 years, or life imprisonment
Article 226	Kidnapping, deprivation of liberty	Up to life imprisonment
Article 255	Repeated enrichment offences (robberies)	Up to life imprisonment

== Cases which men have been sentenced to life imprisonment ==
- In 1977 the Reykjavík Criminal Court sentenced two men to life imprisonment for the murder of two men in the Guðmundur and Geirfinnur case. The sentence was later overturned by the Supreme Court of Iceland
- In 1993 Þórður Jóhann Eyþórsson was convicted of his second murder in the District Court of Reykjavík and sentenced to life imprisonment. He committed the second murder while on parole for his first murder, committed in 1983. The conviction was overturned by the Supreme Court of Iceland and sentenced to be imprisoned for 20 years.
