= Patrik Karlson =

Swedish politician (born 1987)

Member of the Riksdag
- Incumbent
- Assumed office 28 September 2026
- Constituency: Östergötland County
- In office 1 March 2024 – 2026
- Preceded by: Juno Blom
- Constituency: Östergötland County

Personal details
- Born: 1987 (age 38–39) Östergötland County, Sweden
- Party: Liberals

Patrik Karlson (born 1987) is a Swedish politician from the Liberals. Karlson has been a member of the Riksdag for the Liberals since 2025, representing the Östergötland County constituency.

Karlson was a candidate in the 2022 Swedish general election and became a substitute. He was appointed as a new ordinary member of parliament on 1 March 2024 after Juno Blom resigned from the position.

In the Riksdag, Karlson has been a member of the Committee on Social Insurance since October 2024, and a deputy member of the Committee on Civil Affairs, the Committee on Finance, and the Committee on Justice. He was a member of the Committee on Taxation between March and October 2024. Karlson was re-elected at the 2026 Swedish general election.

== See also ==
- List of members of the Riksdag, 2022–2026
- List of members of the Riksdag, 2026–2030
