= Maria Nilsson =

Swedish politician (born 1979)

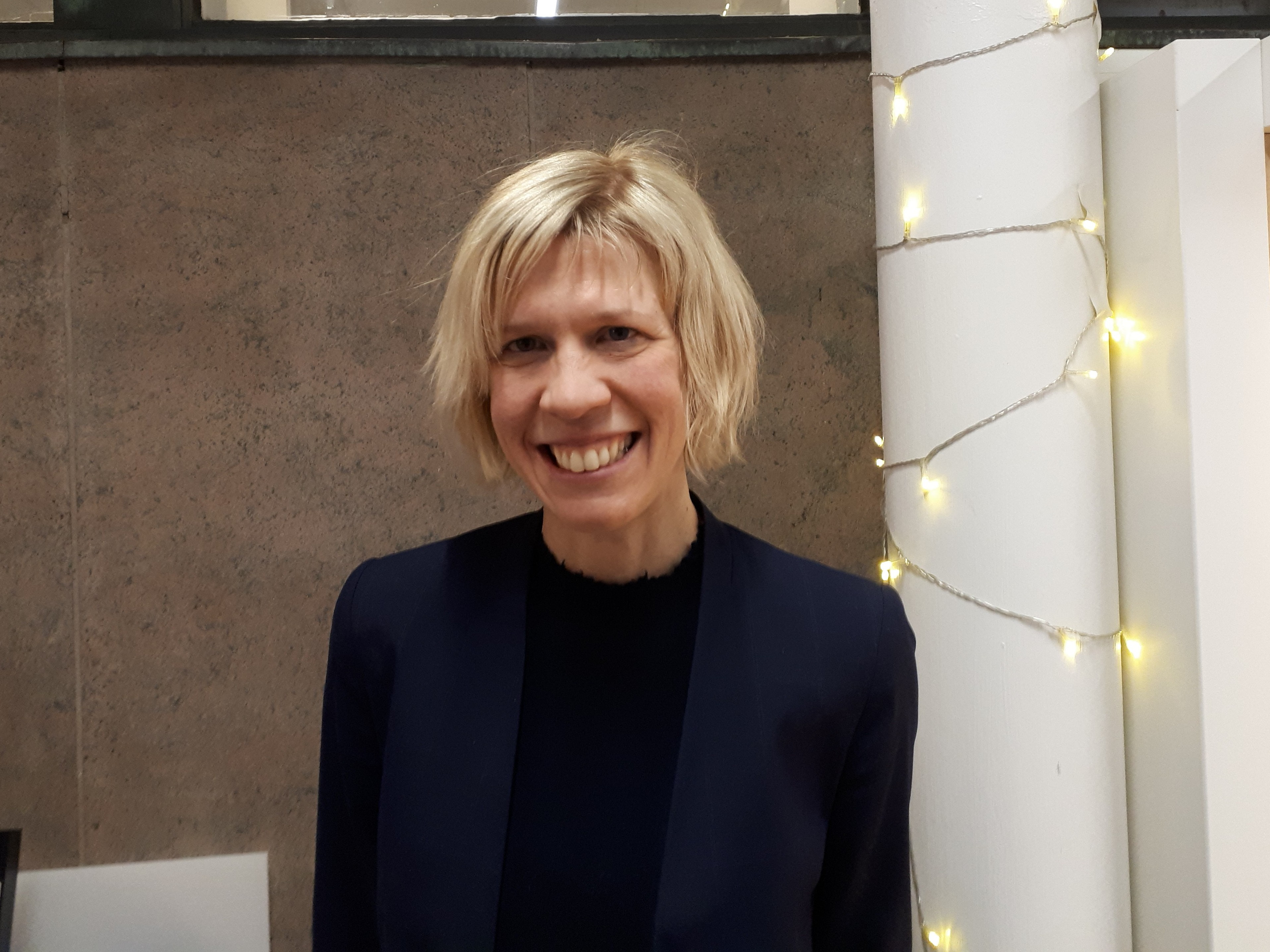
Nilsson in 2019

Maria Nilsson (born 7 June 1979) is a Swedish politician from the Liberals. On 13 April 2022, she became party secretary of the Liberals after Juno Blom's resignation.

== See also ==
- List of members of the Riksdag, 2018–2022
