= Lars-Åke Lagrell =

Swedish sports personality (1940–2020)

president of the Swedish Football Association
- In office 1991–2012

Governor of Kronoberg County
- In office 2002–2006

Personal details
- Born: 20 January 1940
- Died: 21 September 2020

Lars-Åke Lagrell (20 January 1940 near Växjö – 21 September 2020) was a Swedish sports personality who was the president of the Swedish Football Association between 1991 and 2012. In 2002 Prime Minister of Sweden Göran Persson appointed him Governor of Kronoberg County. He continued to serve in both positions until 2006 (when he left the position as Governor), which sparked some criticism because his football engagements were mainly in Solna, outside Stockholm, while as Governor he worked from Växjö. Both are essentially full-time positions.

Civic offices
Preceded by Lennart Johansson	Chairman of SVFF; 1991–2012	Succeeded by Karl-Erik Nilsson
