= Market Court (Sweden) =

Swedish government agency

The Swedish Market Court (Swedish: Marknadsdomstolen) is a Swedish government agency that answers to the Ministry of Integration and Gender Equality. It is located in Stockholm.

The Market Court is a specialized court that tries cases related to the Swedish Competition Act as well as cases involving the Swedish Marketing Act and other consumer and marketing legislation.

== See also ==
- Government agencies in Sweden.
