= Nökkvi Elíasson =

Icelandic photographer

- Born: 2 December 1966 (age 59)
- Occupation: photographer

Nökkvi Elíasson (born 2 December 1966) is an Icelandic photographer.

== Biography ==
Nökkvi began his photography career in the late 1980s, concentrating mostly on black and white images. Much of his work centers around deserted farms and other abandoned buildings in Iceland. Nökkvi's photographs have appeared in books, on CD-covers, and in newspapers in Iceland. In February 2001, he made his first major exhibition at the Reykjavík Museum of Photography with a theme focusing on abandoned farms in Iceland. In 2004, he partnered up with Icelandic writer Aðalsteinn Ásberg Sigurðsson to publish his photographs alongside Sigurðsson's poems, in a work called "Black Sky - Vanishing Iceland".
