= Thomas Kellner =

German photographer, lecturer and curator

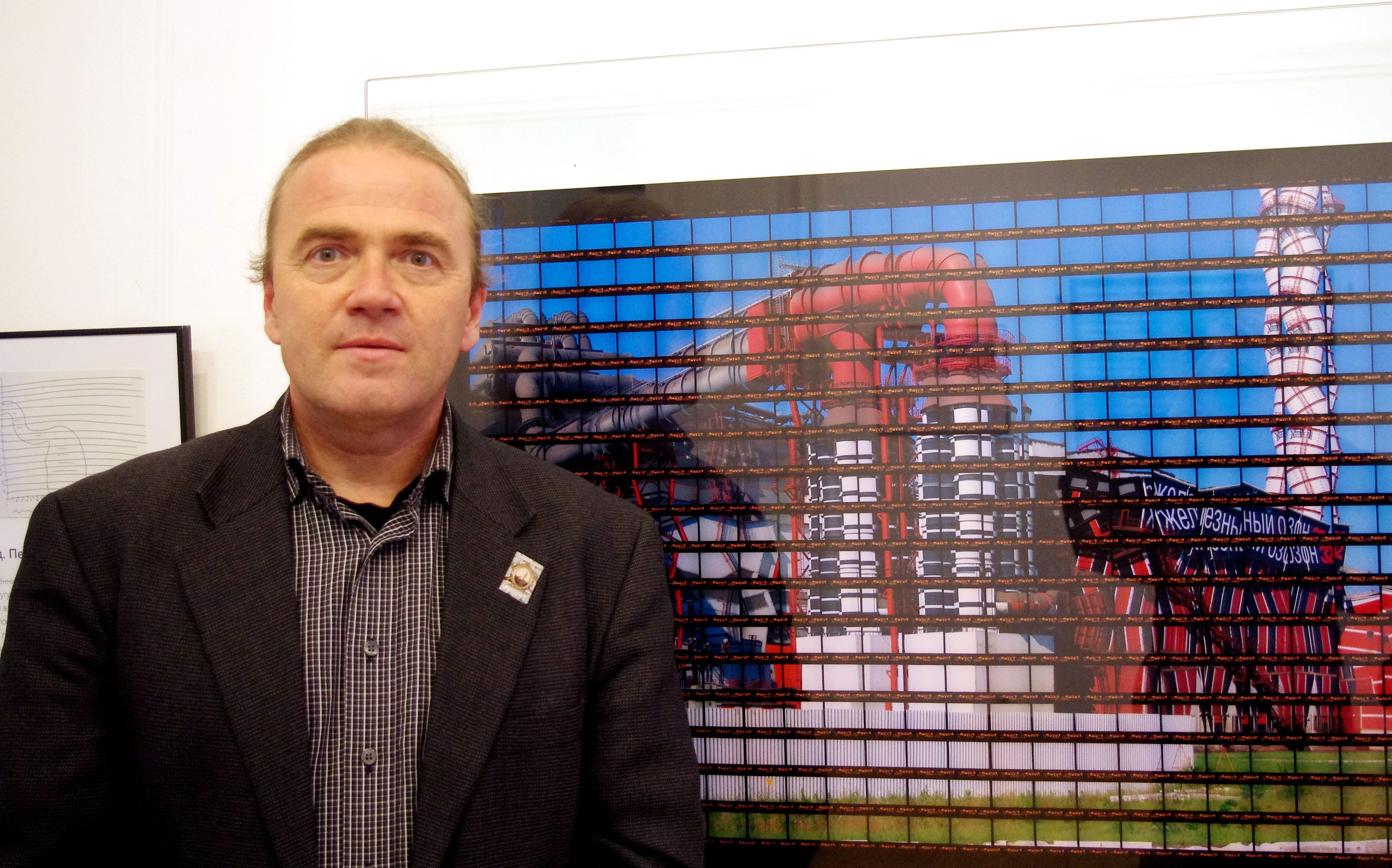
- Kellner in 2013, in front of his own work
- Born: May 28, 1966 (age 60); Bonn, North-Rhine-Westfalia, Germany
- Known for: Photography
- Movement: Cubism
- Website: thomaskellner.com

Thomas Kellner (born May 28, 1966, in Bonn) is a German fine-art photographer, lecturer and curator. He became known above all for his large-format photographs of famous architectural monuments, which, through many individual images and a shifted camera perspective, look like "photo mosaics".

== Life ==
From 1989 to 1996, Kellner studied Art and Social science at the University of Siegen to become a teacher. At the chair of Professor Jürgen Königs, a genuine "school of pinhole camera photography" developed at the University of Siegen's Department of Art, Kellner intensively studied the possibilities and limits of this technique. At the same time he experimented with other methods of photography such as Salt-paper prints and Cyanotype. He also worked with various noble printing processes such as silver gelatine and Gum bichromate.

In 1996, Kellner was awarded the Kodak Young Talent Award. In 2003 and 2004 he was a visiting professor for Fine-art photography at the University of Giessen. In 2012 he held a teaching position for photography at the Paderborn University.

In 2004 Kellner initiated the project Photographers:Network in his hometown, an annual exhibition curated by him with changing themes and international artists. In 2013, the network's last exhibition took place in his studio in Siegen with the tenth exhibition. For this exhibition Kellner had selected works by 18 artists from seven countries and three continents. Starting in 2005, the artist traveled to Brazil several times to take photographs as part of his commission to represent architectural monuments in Brasilia. In 2010 the photos were shown in Brasilia on the occasion of Brasilia's 50th anniversary."

In 2006 Thomas Kellner undertook extensive travels to the United States, Latin America, Syria and China, where he photographed famous monuments such as the Golden Gate Bridge, Boston Athenaeum, and the Great Wall of China in his special technique.

In 2010 he designed a photo project together with pupils from the Gesamtschule Gießen-Ost, which theme was the Telecommunications bunker in Gießen. The project was financially supported by the city of Giessen as part of the competition Stadt der jungen Forscher (City of young researchers). The focus of the students' photographic–artistic work on the bunker was to use Kellner's methodology of deconstructing buildings and reconstructing them in his photographs "as a procedure and transforming it to the conditions on site" (in German "als Verfahren aufzunehmen und auf die Gegebenheiten vor Ort zu transformieren). For this purpose, categories for working with and on the individual components were developed in cooperation with the pupils and topic areas were formulated. Afterwards, the pupils photographed the individual areas with their cameras. The resulting photos were compiled into collages and PowerPoint presentations: "Through the segmentation and subsequent recombination of the different perspectives, a comprehensive and new, but also critical picture of the former bunker complex and the current headquarters of the Musik- und Kunstverein was created[...] The students found the aesthetic examination of National Socialism in a place that is itself a cultural-historical testimony, both haunting and moving." (in German "Durch die Segmentierung und anschließende Neukombination der unterschiedlichen Perspektiven entstand ein umfassendes und neues, aber auch kritisches Bild von der ehemaligen Bunkeranlage und vom heutigen Sitz des Musik- und Kunstvereins.[...] Die ästhetische Auseinandersetzung mit dem Nationalsozialismus an einem Ort, der selbst ein kulturhistorisches Zeugnis ist, empfanden die Schülerinnen und Schüler als eindringlich und bewegend").

In 2012 Thomas Kellner travelled to Russia on behalf of RWE to work in Ekaterinburg and Perm to photograph industrial architecture (Genius Loci). Both cities were founded by Georg Wilhelm de Gennin from Siegen. Gennin was invited by Peter the Great in the 18th century on account of his expertise to promote the economy of the Urals and mining in the region. The factories he founded processed steel and metal. Kellner photographed not only on site in Russia, but also in the surrounding area of Siegen to capture the connection between the two regions in the processing of steel and metal.

Since 2004 Thomas Kellner is a member of the German Society for Photography (Deutsche Gesellschaft für Photographie, DGPh). Kellner lives and works in Siegen.

== Photographic technique ==
Thomas Kellner works with a single-lens reflex camera and uses 35mm film small image rolls. Each picture has a dimension of 24 × 36 millimetres. Each roll of film consists of 36 individual frames. In order to transport the film, perforations are made at the top and bottom of each frame, on which both the type of film used and the number of each frame are noted. After developing the film, Kellner cuts it into strips of equal length and assembles them into one large negative. This is then used to produce the contact sheet, on which the meta-information about the film and the respective number of the shot is still visible.

Usually photographers use the contact sheet to make a selection of the photographed individual images, which are then enlarged. Normally it is never part of the finished photographs. The material as the carrier of the image information remains invisible. But Kellner allows for the information to still be visible on the film in his finished photographs.

On the one hand, this info separates the individual images from one another, thus creating a rhythm and structure of the photographed object, and on the other hand, the viewer thus can follow the artist's working process: "The materiality in photography is treated quite rarely, unlike all other genres such as in painting, sculpture, graphics, etc. Today we always discuss the style, the chosen material itself, such as pigments, canvas, stone, etc. In photography, which is strongly mediatized, everyone tends to look only at the window of the Renaissance, at the object depicted, at most the composition or authorship behind it. Rarely is the chosen photographic paper, its surface, its pigments, or its grain or meaning of the pixels negotiated. This would, however, have been necessary long ago in view of the inclusion of photography in art according to contemporary criteria. [...] The chosen material, the characteristic style of the photographic process should be part of the author's decision and be an indispensable part of the picture's message." (in German "Die Materialität in der Fotografie wird recht selten behandelt, im Unterschied zu allen anderen Genres. In der Malerei, in Bildhauerei, in der Grafik, etc. Immer diskutieren wir heute den Duktus, das gewählte Material an sich, wie die Pigmente, die Leinwand, den Stein, etc. In der Fotografie, die stark medialisiert ist tendieren alle immer dazu nur das Fenster der Renaissance zu betrachten, den abgebildeten Gegenstand, maximal die Komposition oder die Autorenschaft dahinter. Seltenst wird über das gewählte Fotopapier, seine Oberfläche, seine Pigmente, oder sein Korn, bzw. Bedeutung der Pixel verhandelt. Dies wäre allerdings mit Rücksicht der Einbeziehung der Fotografie in die Kunst nach zeitgenössischen Kriterien längst notwendig. [...] Das gewählte Material, der Duktus des fotografischen Prozesses sollte mit zur Entscheidung des Autors gehören und zur Bildaussage unabdingbar hinzugehören."

When Kellner takes on a project, he makes sketches beforehand by dividing the object to be photographed into square sections and noting the planned camera settings for each section. When actually photographing the object, there can be several hours between the first and the last picture of a roll, because Kellner takes his photographs in chronological order, one after the other.

Whereas Kellner used to work with only one roll of film in the beginning – with the finished photograph consisting of only 36 individual 35mm images - he now uses up to 60 rolls of film. For his photograph of the Grand Canyon, 2160 individual pictures were thus created, and with them 2160 different views of the natural wonder, which he then assembled into a single photo with a length of 5 meters.

== Effect of the pictures ==
The first photograph Kellner created with this technique was an image of the Eiffel Tower (1997), which he conceived as a homage to the Cubist artist Robert Delaunay. Delauney was very fascinated by what was then the highest building in the world and dedicated much of his work to its depiction. Kellner took the typical cubist "multi-view" (in German "Mehransichtigkeit") approach of the objects and developed it into the central design element of his photographs. The perspective of the individual images – shifted in relation to the Central perspective – gives the impression of movement of the immobile architectural icons: "The viewer thinks that by dismanteling a building into individual pieces of an image and by tilting the camera several times the most famous sites in the world – from the Eiffel Tower to the Brooklyn Bridge – begin to rock, to sway, even to dance. Architecture is turned upside down."

When Kellner traveled to Mexico in 2006 to photograph important buildings there, one critic noted that his photos looked very similar to those taken after the 1985 Mexico City earthquake. "Kellner’s photographs are often read as deconstructing the landmarks of human culture. From this perspective, his pictures are a visual manifestation of the way in which culture has become vulnerable, broken, and collapsing." Dance and destruction thus lie close together in the works of Kellner.

The perception of large objects is usually not perceivable to humans at a single glance. Only as the eye wanders and adds up a "total view" of many different impressions does the depicted object become clear: "Our brain completes incoming sensory information into a uniform whole and ascribes meaning to this perception" (In German "Unser Gehirn ergänzt einlaufende Sinnesinformationen zu einem einheitlichen Ganzen und schreibt dieser Wahrnehmung Bedeutung zu"). Kellner not only shows exactly this combination of individual images to form a Gestalt perception in his works, but the viewer himself actively recreates this experience when watching a Kellner photograph. His eyes, too, constantly move back and forth between the perception of the individual images to the overall shot and the photographs of Kellner thus can be perceived as a kind of experimental arrangement for a direct experience of what happens when we see large objects: "It is no coincidence that Kellner’s works should look like assembled puzzles because they engage the thoughtful viewer into unraveling —both visually and intellectually—the meaning of these architectural structures. We decode the scenes from the fragments he puts together, from the automatic expectations submitted by our brain, and from the more or less vague memories we have of the structures.".

== Works in collections (selection) ==
- George Eastman Museum, Rochester, New York, United States
- Museum of Fine Arts, Houston, Houston, Texas, United States
- Sammlung Schupmann. Fotografie in Deutschland nach 1945, Bad Hersfeld, Germany
- Art Institute of Chicago: Collection of Photography, Chicago, Illinois, United States
- Worcester Art Museum, Worcester, Massachusetts, United States
- Fox Talbot Museum, Lacock Abbey, Lacock, England
- Library of Congress, Washington D.C., United States

== Solo exhibitions (selection) ==
- 2002: Griffin Museum of Photography, Winchester, Massachusetts, United States
- 2003: Monuments, Rosenberg & Kaufmann Fine Art, New York City, United States
- 2006: Tango Metropolis, Cohen Amador Gallery, New York City, United States
- 2006: Tango Metropolis, Stephen Cohen Gallery, Los Angeles, California, United States
- 2008: Thomas Kellner: Architectural Photos, Schneider Gallery, Chicago, Illinois, United States
- 2012: Small wonders, Photography Museum of Lishui, Lishui, China
- 2013: Genius Loci, Metenkow House Museum of Photography, Yekaterinburg, Russia
- 2017: Fractured Architecture, Fox Talbot Museum, Lacock Abbey, England
- 2017: Black and White,Reykjavik Museum of Photography, Reykjavík, Iceland
- 2018: Tango Metropolis, Conny Dietzschold Gallery, Sydney, Australia
- 2019: All shook up: Thomas Kellner's America, American Museum and Gardens, Claverton Manor, Bath, England

== Group exhibitions (selection) ==
- 2002: Vues d’architecture, Musée de Grenoble, Grenoble, France
- 2004: Ars & Archittetura 1900–2000, Palazzo Ducale, Genoa, Italy
- 2004: Pieced Together: Photomontages from the Collection, Art Institute of Chicago, Illinois, United States
- 2005: New to View: Recent Acquisitions in Photography, Worcester Art Museum, Worcester, Massachusetts, United States
- 2008: A mind at play, Art Institute of Chicago, Illinois, United States
- 2010: Madrid Oh Cielos!, Círculo de Bellas Artes, Madrid, Spain
- 2011: Fotografias – Coleção Joaquim Paiva, Museum of Modern Art, Rio de Janeiro, Brazil
- 2013: After Photoshop: Manipulated Photography in the Digital Age, Museum of Fine Arts, Houston, Texas, United States
- 2015: Gifts from Nancy and Tom O’Neil, Baltimore Museum of Art, Baltimore, Maryland, United States
- 2016: Die Grosse, Museum Kunstpalast, Düsseldorf, Germany
- 2018: Landschaft, die sich erinnert, Museum for Modern Art, Siegen, Germany
- 2018: Analog Schwarzweiss: Fotografie in Westdeutschland 1945 bis 2000 aus der Sammlung Schupmann, Kunsthalle Erfurt, Erfurt, Germany
