= Lionel Haward =

British forensic psychologist (1920–1998)

- Born: 1920
- Died: 1998 (aged 77–78)
- Occupation: Clinical psychologist
- Known for: "father of British forensic psychology"
- Notable work: Forensic Psychology (1981)

Lionel Richard Charles Haward, FBPsS (1920–1998) was a British clinical psychologist and academic, who has been described as the "father of British forensic psychology". Following service with the Royal Air Force Police during the Second World War, he worked in the National Health Service in psychiatric hospitals. He led a successful campaign to allow psychologists to testify as experts in court in England, and was then himself an expert witness at a number of high-profile trials. He latterly taught at the University of Surrey, rising to become Professor of Clinical Psychology.

== Early life and education ==
Haward was born in 1920. He was educated at the Earl Haig School in Aldershot, Hampshire, England. After returning from military service after the Second World Was, he studied chemistry and psychology at the University of Bristol, graduating with a bachelor's degree in 1950. He remained at Bristol to complete a Master of Arts (BA) degree, before undertaking a Doctor of Psychology (Dr Psy) degree at Leyden University in the Netherlands.

== Career ==
During the Second World War, Haward joined the Royal Air Force (RAF). He was first attached to RAF Technical Training Command, before transferring to the RAF Police with whom he served in Germany. In the aftermath of the liberation of the concentration camps, Haward "drew up a list of characteristics that high-ranking Nazi war criminals might display" that could be used in addition to survivors' witness testimony to identify SS officials and camp guards who had disguised themselves as ordinary soldiers or airmen; this strategy was an early example of offender profiling.

Haward successfully led a campaign to allow psychologists to testify as experts in court in England; previously only medically qualified persons were allowed to testify on the "mental functioning of witnesses or defendants". He was an expert witness for many notable criminal trials in the 1960s and 1970s, including Donald Neilson, John Stonehouse MP, and the Oz magazine obscenity trials.

He worked in the National Health Service as a clinical psychologist at psychiatric hospitals, including Barrow Hospital, Bristol, Winterton Hospital, County Durham, and Graylingwell Hospital, Chichester. In 1973, he joined the University of Surrey as a reader in clinical psychology. He rose to become Professor of Clinical Psychology, giving his inaugural lecture in 1979 titled "Hypnosis in the service of research". He retired from the university in 1987 and was appointed professor emeritus, but continued to work as an honorary consultant psychologist and as an expert witness.

== Selected works ==
- Haward, Lionel R. C. (September 1960). "The subjective meaning of stress". British Journal of Medical Psychology. 33 (3): 185–194. doi:10.1111/j.2044-8341.1960.tb01239.x. PMID 13712391.
- Haward, Lionel R. C. (1979). "3: The Psychologist as Expert Witness". In D. P., Farrington; K., Hawkins; S. M., Lloyd-Bostock (eds.). Psychology, Law and Legal Processes. Oxford Socio-Legal Studies. London: Palgrave Macmillan UK. pp. 44–53. ISBN 978-1-349-04250-0.
- Haward, L. R. C. (1981). Forensic psychology. London: Batsford Academic and Educational. ISBN 9780713424751.
- Haward, L. R. C. (1990). Dictionary of Forensic Psychology. Chichester: Barry Rose Law. ISBN 978-1872328256.
- Gudjonsson, Gisli H.; Haward, L. R. C. (1998). Forensic psychology: a guide to practice. London; New York: Routledge. ISBN 0-415-13290-8.
