= Source amnesia =

Remembering information but not its source

Source amnesia is the inability to remember where, when or how previously learned information has been acquired, while retaining the factual knowledge. This branch of amnesia is associated with the malfunctioning of one's explicit memory. It is likely that the disconnect between having the knowledge and remembering the context in which the knowledge was acquired is due to a dissociation between semantic and episodic memory – an individual retains the semantic knowledge (the fact), but lacks the episodic knowledge to indicate the context in which the knowledge was gained.

Memory representations reflect the encoding processes during acquisition. Different types of acquisition processes (e.g.: reading, thinking, listening) and different types of events (e.g.: newspaper, thoughts, conversation) will produce mental depictions that perceptually differ from one another in the brain, making it harder to retrieve where information was learned when placed in a different context of retrieval. Source monitoring involves a systematic process of slow and deliberate thought of where information was originally learned. Source monitoring can be improved by using more retrieval cues, discovering and noting relations and extended reasoning.

== Causes ==
Source amnesia is not a rare phenomenon – everybody experiences it on a near daily basis as, for much of our knowledge, it is important to remember the knowledge itself, rather than its source. However, there are extreme examples of source amnesia caused by a variety of factors.

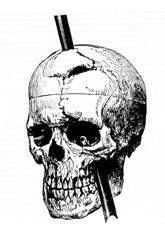
Phineas Gage exemplifies an individual who had frontal lobe damage. A large iron rod was driven through his frontal left lobe effecting changes on his personality.

=== Frontal lobe damage ===
Individuals with frontal lobe damage have deficits in temporal context memory; source memory can also exhibit deficits in those with frontal lobe damage. It appears that those with frontal lobe damage have difficulties with recency and other temporal judgements (e.g., placing events in the order they occurred), and as such they are unable to properly attribute their knowledge to appropriate sources (i.e., have source amnesia). Those individuals with frontal lobe damage have normal recall of facts, but they make significantly more errors in source memory than control subjects, with these effects becoming apparent as shortly as 5 minutes after the learning experience. Individuals with frontal lobe damage often mistakenly attribute the knowledge they have to some other source (e.g., they read it somewhere, saw it on TV, etc.) but rarely attribute it to having learned it over the course of the experiment. It appears that frontal lobe damage causes a disconnection between semantic and episodic memory – in that the individuals cannot associate the context in which they acquired the knowledge to the knowledge itself.

=== Age-related ===
Elderly individuals have been shown to exhibit source amnesia. Compared to younger individuals, in experiments where the individuals are presented with obscure or even made up trivia facts, older people remember less information overall in both recall and recognition tasks and they often misattribute the source of their knowledge, at time periods of both long and short delays.

This effect is potentially due to the neuronal loss associated with aging occurring mainly in the frontal lobes. It has been previously noticed that frontal lobe damage can cause source amnesia, so the loss of neurons in this area of the brain associated with aging may very well be the cause of the age-related source amnesia seen.

=== Alzheimer's disease ===
Alzheimer's disease (AD), which is known to be associated with frontal lobe dysfunction, is implicated as a cause of source amnesia. In laboratory conditions, one study found source monitoring to be so poor that the AD participants were correctly performing source memory attributions at approximately chance. This lack of ability to attribute the source of memories is likely related to AD patients' deficits in reality monitoring. Reality monitoring, the process of distinguishing whether information originated from an external or an internal source, relies on judgement processes to examine the qualitative characteristics of the information in order to determine if the information was real or imagined. It appears that it is this process that is experiencing the dysfunction, which causes mild confabulation in some AD patients, as well as being related to the source amnesia experienced in some individuals with AD.

=== Schizophrenia ===
Schizophrenia is associated with episodic memory deficits often characterized by a confusion of internal stimuli and real events. It appears that individuals with schizophrenia often display failures in monitoring/remembering the source of information, especially for self-generated items – that is, they display source amnesia. This is a stable trait in this disease – one experiment found that over a two-year period, an individual's rate of source attributing errors was maintained, despite fluctuations in medication status and the individual's symptoms. This effect is possibly due to the malformation of associations among aspects of an episode needed for remembering its source; one neuroimaging study found that individuals with schizophrenia had lower activation of areas associated with source memory.

Individuals with schizophrenia who display source memory deficits often do so due to reality-monitoring dysfunction, which is a contributing factor towards the hallucinations that characterize the disorder. One study found that schizophrenia patients were not only slower, but also less accurate, at tasks involving reality-monitoring. The hallucinations that characterize schizophrenia are a result of deficit in reality monitoring – they exhibit an inability to differentiate between internally and externally derived information. Overall, there is evidence of a relationship between source monitoring errors and the disorganized thinking that characterizes those who have schizophrenia in that there is a strong tendency for those people with hallucinations to attribute their internally generated events (i.e.: hallucinations and delusions) to an external source (e.g., the experimenter). That is, schizophrenia is characterized by failing to encode themselves as the source of the idea, compounded by attributing these ideas/beliefs to an external source, all of which leads to those individuals with schizophrenia exhibiting behaviours typical of those with source amnesia; they misattribute the source of their knowledge, ideas, or beliefs.

=== Post traumatic stress disorder ===
Post traumatic stress disorder (PTSD) is characterized by intrusive, vivid recollections of the traumatic event and impoverished episodic memory for all other events. Those individuals with PTSD experience memory distortions caused by source amnesia, as well as false memory construction and unintentional integration of information that was not present for the original memory. Not only do individuals with this condition experience less vivid and decontextualized episodic memory for all events outside of the traumatic experience, but also, individuals with PTSD have difficulties with identifying the source of both emotional and neutral information overall. Those with PTSD may have poorer recall for the source of their knowledge due to deficits in the encoding process which creates weaker relationships between the item and its context.

=== Depression ===
Depression is associated with overly generalized memories and individuals with depression perform more poorly on source memory attribution tasks as compared to non-depressed individuals. These individuals show a memory bias for remembering negative information, possibly due to enhanced amygdala activity during the encoding of emotional (particularly negative) information. Overall, there is a relationship between the emotional arousal of an episode and its source memory – there is some evidence that the enhanced processing of negative memories results in poorer source memory, and thus individuals who are depressed would have increased amounts of source amnesia.

=== Hypnosis ===
Hypnosis as a cause of source amnesia involves carrying out hypnosis and having the subjects remember post-hypnotically, experiences they had during hypnosis as tested by asking the individuals about esoteric knowledge that they learned during hypnosis. These individuals typically have no recall of the hypnotic experience whatsoever; however, when tested on these obscure pieces of knowledge they are able to supply the correct answer, demonstrating their source amnesia. The subjects often attribute their knowledge of the obscure facts to learning experiences other than during hypnosis (e.g.: "I read it somewhere," "Somebody must have told me," etc.).

== Diagnostic tests ==
=== Wisconsin Card Sorting Test (WCST) ===
The Wisconsin Card Sorting Test is widely used in clinical settings to test for cognitive impairments, such as frontal lobe disorder which has been associated with source amnesia.

Procedure

Two sets of 12 identical cards forms the visuo-spatial component for the test. The figures on the cards differ with respect to color, quantity, and shape. The participants are then given a pile of additional cards and are asked to match each one to one of the previous cards.

Results

Patients with frontal lobe dysfunction and ultimately source amnesia, will have much greater difficulty finishing this task successfully through method of strategy.

=== Verbal fluency test ===
The verbal fluency test is a widely and commonly used test to assess for frontal lobe dysfunction in patients.

Procedure

Participants are asked to generate words beginning with letters that had previously been introduced to them (e.g.: generate a word beginning with 'A' or 'R'). They are given three 1-min trials (one trial per letter). The goal is to say as many different words possible that begin with the given letter.

Results

The Verbal fluency test can assess for damage in the prefrontal lobes, which has been associated with patients who have source amnesia. Patients with frontal lobe disorder have trouble putting verbal items into a proper sequential order, monitor personal behaviors as well as a deficient judgment in recency. All of these behaviors are required for the proper recall of the source of a memory.

=== Stroop Color-Naming Task ===
Research has shown that the Stroop effect has numerous findings related to age and its effect on memory. The test measures speed and accuracy skills of naming colors and colored words, to determine the effects of aging on the brain which is thought to be a cause of source amnesia.

Procedure

The participant is asked to read a series of related word-reading and color-naming trials. In the first component of the task, known as the word-reading condition of the task, the participant is asked to read as quickly as possible a series of color names printed either in white or other various colors. The participant is then asked to name the color of a series of colored blocks.

In the second component of the task or the color word-naming condition, the participant is instructed to name the color of a sequence of words presented in another color (e.g.: the word is "red" but the color of the word is printed in green, the participant must name the color of the ink, not the actual word).

Results

In healthy patients, the condition of naming the color, is slower than the first task of just reading the word. Patients with prefrontal damage (source amnesia) will name the color and ignore the word, even as the rules change and they are told to name just the word, the color continues to be named on following trials.

Relating back to age, the findings of this study concluded that aging begins to affect one's ability to successfully finish the Stroop test in the 6th and 7th decade of life. This branch of cognitive aging has been found to mainly affect the prefrontal lobes. The Stroop Color-Naming Task measures the degree to which one has source amnesia. The severity of the damage to the prefrontal lobes directly correlates to the speed of which an individual can complete the Stroop Color-Naming Task. The more damage one has endured to this part of the brain, the slower they will complete the task.

=== Old-New Recognition Test ===
Decisions made in the context of this test will be based more on familiarity than deep inspection of the contents of memories.

People with source amnesia during this test feel 'phantom' feelings of familiarity towards words that are semantically related (e.g.: candy, sugar, sweet) and will more often claim to have seen a word that was not presented during the experiment.

Procedure

Showing the participant a list of words and assessing at different time intervals to see if the participant remembers which words were presented and which were not. For example, a list of 15 words could be given to a participant to study from. The experimenter will then test the participant's knowledge of the list 20 minutes later by presenting the list of studied words mixed in randomly with several 'lure' words (words that are semantically similar to the previously studied words but not the same) and new words.

If the participant is successful in this task, they have distinguished between the previously learned words and the lure words.

This experiment can be tested multiple times with the same participant over different time periods (e.g.: 3 months later then tested again 6 months later).

Results

Participants are more likely to show source amnesia with the 'lure' words but not with the newly presented words. This means that they confuse the familiarity of the semantically similar words with words that they studied in the original list.

== Prevention ==
Research suggests that source amnesia results from poor memory encoding of a particular context opposed to poor retrieval of a context specific memory, except within the case of amnesiacs. This is because content must be encoded along with context in order for the two to be integrated into memory. Since poor encoding may be responsible for source amnesia, it is not likely that a person will be able to retrieve a specific source memory in the future if it was not properly encoded. This makes it difficult to create treatments for source amnesia because the information may not be integrated properly within the brain. Certain prevention strategies have been studied in order to target at-risk populations and teach them how to prevent the loss of contextual memory as well as how to improve source memory in the general population.

=== General population ===
While source amnesia appears to be the most prevalent in populations with specific brain impairments, it is possible for individuals without deficits in memory to experience source amnesia. This may happen if a person only encodes content and does not integrate the context-specific information into memory. Research suggests that context-specific information is better recalled in situations that involve emotional stimuli or words. This suggests that source memory may benefit from thinking about emotions related to the content in order to better encode source related information. This is related to theories on flashbulb memory.

=== Children ===
Children are more likely to correctly identify source information if they have been taught to think about the relation between the speaker and the information being shared. This holds true whether the children think about perceptual or emotional ties to the speaker but the effect appears larger when emotional context is considered. The increase in accurate source encoding is not without a cost as it was demonstrated that children who improved their source encoding typically remembered less than controls when it came to recalling semantic or non-source information. This suggests that there may be a trade-off when it comes to different types of memory in children because they are only able to attend to a certain amount of information at one time.

=== Older adults ===
Older adults may have memory impairments as a result of the natural aging process. These memory impairments may be due to degeneration of the frontal lobe and other age related changes. It is very common for older adults to experience increased source amnesia for memories compared to younger adults. Prevention of source amnesia in older adults may include memory training programs in an attempt to increase cortical thickness in the brain. Research suggests that even the brains of older adults may be capable of continuing plasticity. In one particular study, older adults were exposed to 8-week long memory training programs. These memory-training programs involved serial memory recall practice using mental imagery as a mnemonic device. Adults involved in the memory-training program showed significant improvement in their source memory specifically. In addition to the memory benefits, increased cortical thickness was shown using MRI scans. While this research has not been tested in a longitudinal study, it suggests that older adults and perhaps other at-risk groups for source amnesia could benefit from explicit memory training exercises.

Another way in which older adults can avoid source amnesia is to think about the relationship between the content and context of an experience or memory. This preventative measure must be taken when information is being encoded in order to direct attention to the source and to be aware of how it relates to the content. Participants experiencing source amnesia performed at the same level of groups not at risk of source amnesia when these strategies were implicated suggesting that those who do not experience this memory deficit may integrate content and context implicitly.

== Implications in eyewitness testimony ==
Eyewitness testimonies are an integral aspect in the criminal court system as judges and juries depend on them as evidence to determine a verdict. However, studies have shown that source amnesia can interfere with a witness's memory because any incorrect post-event information encountered, results in distorted memories and source confusion. Post-event information can come from leading questions, statements made by the media or co-witnesses. Since improper encoding causes source amnesia, witnesses who are stressed or distracted during the event and fail to pay attention are susceptible to encoding wrong details into their memory, claiming to have seen things they only imagined. This causes grave legal implications given that it can result in wrongful convictions; therefore, it is important that interrogation practices are carefully carried out.

== Related phenomena ==
=== Post-hypnotic amnesia ===
Post-hypnotic source amnesia is the phenomenon where an individual is taught obscure information while under hypnosis and then asked to recall this information during their conscious state, however, they do not remember how or when that knowledge was taught to them. Studies have shown that subjects are unable to remember anything that occurred during hypnosis and when asked how they acquired the knowledge to answer the questions, they tended to rationalize their incapability to indicate how they learned it. This phenomenon is similar to flashbulb memories or tip-of-the-tongue.

=== Misattributed familiarity ===
Misattributed familiarity is the failure to recall the correct source of where the information came from and instead, the individual attributes the knowledge to an incorrect source. This results from an error in the decision-making process that confuses the origin of the information.

=== Cryptomnesia ===
Cryptomnesia occurs when an individual is certain that a certain word, idea, song, etc. is their own original thought when in actuality it was retrieved from memory without their knowledge, resulting in accidental plagiarism. In order to prevent this, source monitoring is required to avoid attributing the thought as one's own. However, this slows down the quick retrieval of memory needed in daily life, such as in conversation. This has seen to occur in the music industry and has the implication of copyright infringement over songs, as well as in the formation of scientific research ideas.

== See also ==
- Context-dependent memory – Improved recall when the context of a situation is the same
- Memory distrust syndrome – Psychological condition
- Sleeper effect – Psychological phenomenon
- Source-monitoring error – Type of memory error
