= Juno Blom =

Swedish politician (born 1968)

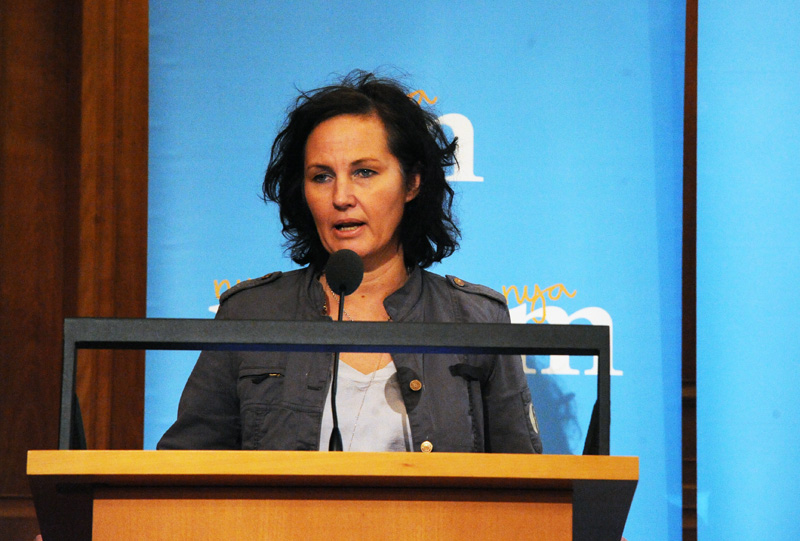
- Juno Blom in January 2014

Ombudsman for Children in Sweden
- Incumbent
- Assumed office 1 March 2024
- Preceded by: Elisabeth Dahlin

Party secretary of the Liberals
- In office 28 June 2019 – 8 April 2022
- Party leader: Nyamko Sabuni
- Preceded by: Maria Arnholm
- Succeeded by: Maria Nilsson

Member of the Riksdag
- In office 24 September 2018 – 1 March 2024
- Constituency: Östergötland County

Personal details
- Born: 8 October 1968 (age 57) Norrköping, Sweden
- Party: Liberals

Juno Maria Petra Blom (born 8 October 1968) is a Swedish civil servant and former politician (of the Liberals) who has served as Ombudsman for Children in Sweden since 1 March 2024.

Blom became a member of the Liberals in 2017 and was elected Member of the Riksdag in the 2018 Swedish general election, serving until her appointment as Ombudsman for Children in Sweden in 2024, representing the constituency of Östergötland County. She was the party secretary of the Liberals from June 2019 to April 2022 during the leadership of Nyamko Sabuni.

For twelve years prior to her entrance in the Riksdag, Blom advocated against honor violence and honor oppresition in the regional council for Östergötland county.

During her youth, Blom was a promising golf player at the Norrköping Golfclub.

== Awards ==
Blom was awarded the Pela och Fadime (Pela och Fadime-utmärkelsen) award in 2018 for her fight against honor violence and oppression.

Party political offices
Preceded by Maria Arnholm	Party secretary of the Liberals Party; 2019–2022	Succeeded by Maria Nilsson
