= Ombudsman for Children in Sweden =

The Ombudsman for Children in Sweden (Swedish: Barnombudsmannen, BO) is a Swedish government agency organized under the Ministry of Health and Social Affairs tasked with public advocacy and the dissemination of information about the rights and needs of children and young people. The Ombudsman should represent children regarding their rights and interests on the basis of the UN Convention on the Rights of the Child (CRC). The Ombudsman has legal authority to request information and to summon representatives from the municipalities, counties and other authorities to talks, but hold no regulatory powers. There's no government mandate to focus or issue an opinion on individual cases. However, the Ombudsman has a legal duty of notification, meaning they are required by law to report to the local social services, whenever they become aware of an abused child.

The Ombudsman holds regular dialogues with children, especially those in vulnerable situations, to obtain knowledge of their conditions and their opinions. The agency report back to the government once a year, and the report consists of a magazine, usually with a specific theme; with additional information presented on the Ombudsman's website.

== History ==
In 1990 the Riksdag ratified the CRC. Sweden was thereby committed under international law to implement the convention, and around the same time the Government appointed a Commission of inquiry to examine the issue of appointing an Ombudsman for Children. In 1993, the Riksdag finally approved the appointment of an Ombudsman, and The Ombudsman for Children's Act (1993:335) came into effect on July 1.

== List of Ombudsmen for Children ==
Over the years, the following people served as the ombudsman:

- Louise Sylwander, 1993-2001
- Lena Nyberg, 2001-2008
- Fredrik Malmberg, 2008-2017
- Anita Wickström, acting, 2017
- Anna Karin Hildingson Boqvist, acting, 2018
- Elisabeth Dahlin, 2018–2024
- Juno Blom, 2024–

== See also ==
- Ombudsman
- Children's Ombudsman
