= Board of Supervision of Estate Agents (Sweden) =

Government agency

Swedish Board of Supervision of Estate Agents (Swedish: Fastighetsmäklarnämnden) is a Swedish government agency that answers to the Ministry of Finance. The agency is located in Karlstad, Värmland's County.

It handles tasks related to the state supervision of real estate agents.

== See also ==
- Government agencies in Sweden
