= Nyamko Sabuni =

Swedish politician (born 1969)

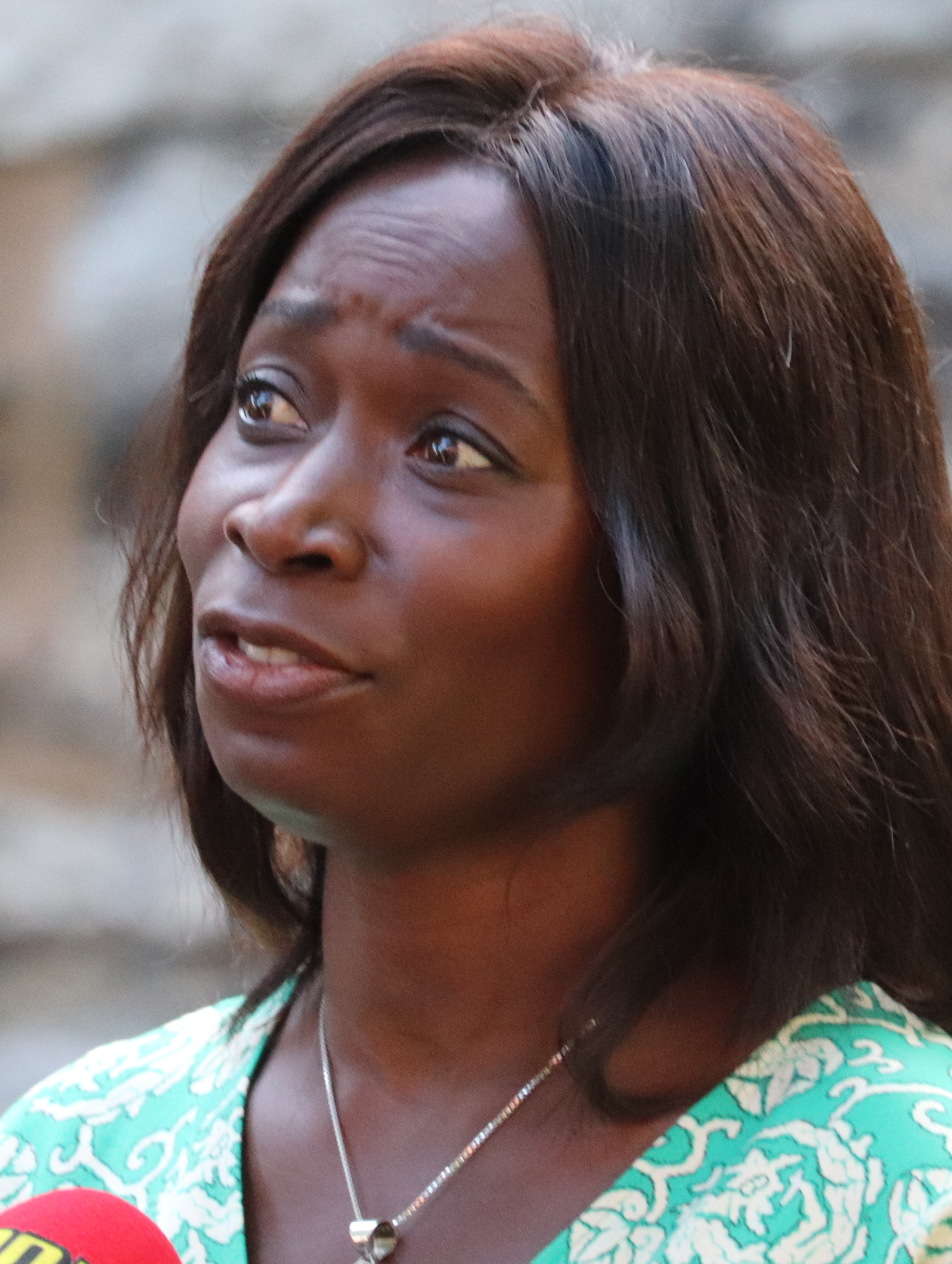
- Sabuni in 2019

Leader of the Liberals
- In office 28 June 2019 – 8 April 2022
- Preceded by: Jan Björklund
- Succeeded by: Johan Pehrson

Minister for Gender Equality
- In office 6 October 2006 – 21 January 2013
- Prime Minister: Fredrik Reinfeldt
- Preceded by: Jens Orback
- Succeeded by: Maria Arnholm

Minister for Integration
- In office 6 October 2006 – 5 October 2010
- Prime Minister: Fredrik Reinfeldt
- Preceded by: Jens Orback
- Succeeded by: Erik Ullenhag

Personal details
- Born: Nyamko Ana Sabuni; 31 March 1969 (age 57) Bujumbura, Burundi
- Party: Liberals
- Education: Uppsala University
- Website: www.liberalerna.se

Nyamko Ana Sabuni (born 31 March 1969) is a Swedish politician who was Leader of the Liberals between June 2019 and April 2022. She previously served as Minister for Integration from 2006 to 2010 and as Minister for Gender Equality from 2006 to 2013 in the Swedish government. A member of the Liberal Party, Sabuni was elected a Member of Parliament in 2002. Sabuni made history in June 2019 by becoming the first party leader in the Swedish parliament coming from an ethnic minority and the first party leader of a refugee background. In April 2022, Sabuni resigned as party leader.

== Personal life ==
Nyamko Sabuni was born in Bujumbura in Burundi, where her father, a left-wing politician from Zaire, lived in exile. Sabuni's father is a Christian, while her mother is a Muslim. She is part of the Bembe people.

The family obtained political asylum in Sweden in 1981 and Sabuni grew up in Kungsängen, north of Stockholm. She studied law at Uppsala University, migration policy at Mälardalen University College in Eskilstuna, and information and media communications at Berghs School of Communication in Stockholm.

She was married from 2004 to 2012 and has twin sons from that marriage. She has described herself as non-religious.

== Political career ==
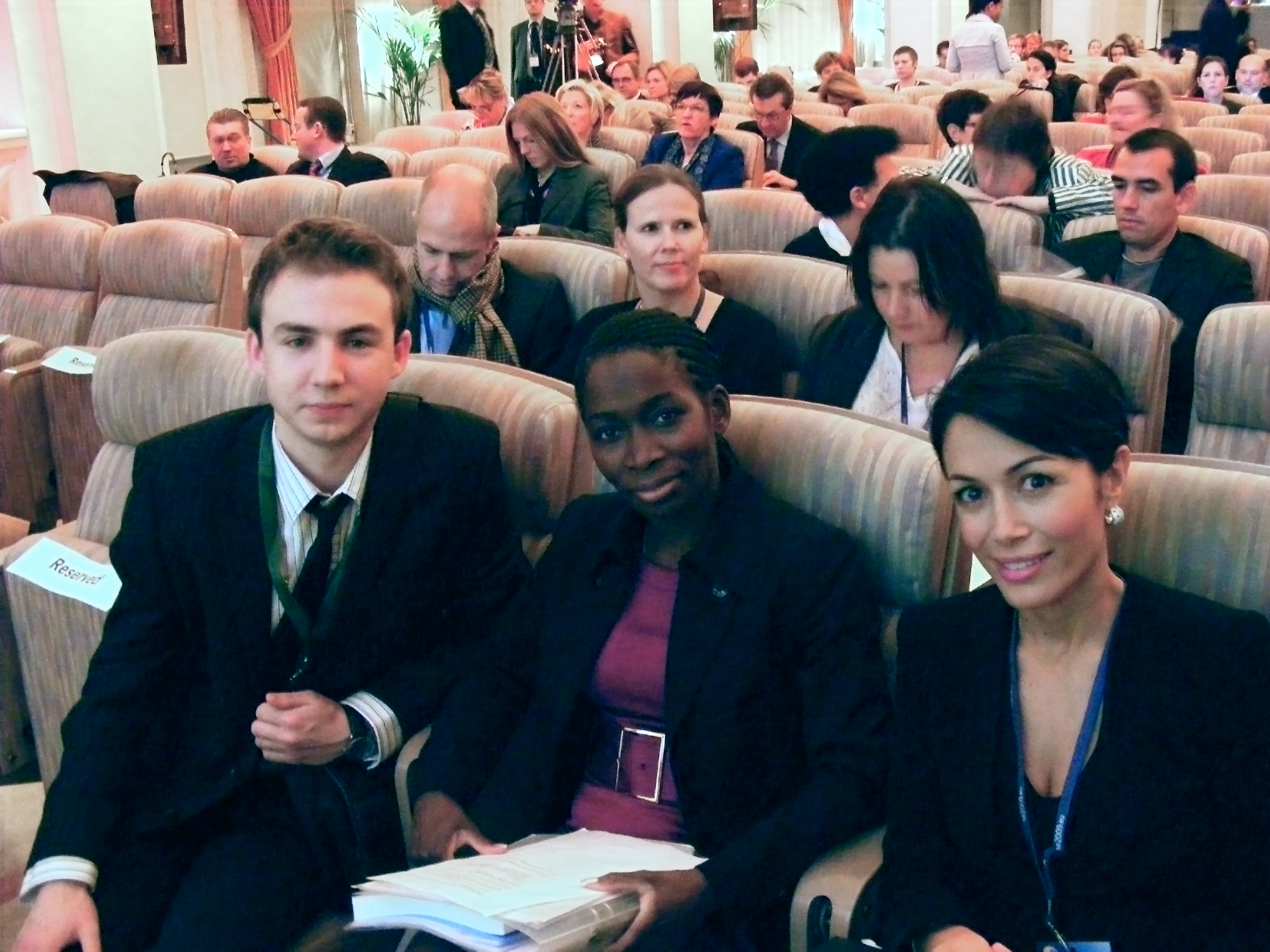
Paweł Rogaliński, Nyamko Sabuni and Mara Carfagna during the Third Equality Summit in Stockholm in September 2009.

Sabuni was a member of board of the Liberal Youth of Sweden from 1996 to 1998. She has cited the murder of Ivorian refugee Gerard Gbeyo, committed by a Swedish neo-Nazi in the town of Klippan in 1995, as one of the reasons she became involved in politics.

Shortly after she was elected into office, she made a publicized decision to withdraw funding for the organization Centrum mot rasism, where her uncle Mkyabela Sabuni was a director.

In a 17 July 2006 opinion letter published in the Swedish newspaper Expressen, Sabuni called for mandatory gynecological examinations of all schoolgirls in order to prevent genital mutilation. She has proposed a ban on hijab for girls under 15 and also advocated the inclusion of honor killings as an independent category within the Swedish criminal code. In July 2006, her book Flickorna vi sviker ("The Girls We Let Down"), about women in Sweden living under the threat of honor violence, was published.

Sabuni states that practicing Muslims who live by the Qur'an "limit their own opportunities". She suggests that practices such as praying five times a day or questioning music, marginalize Muslims.

Sabuni supports the legalization of medical cannabis.

=== 2006–2013: Minister ===
On 6 October 2006, the new Swedish coalition government which emerged from the election announced Sabuni's appointment as the new Minister for Integration and Gender Equality. She is the first person of African descent to be appointed as Minister in the Swedish government.

Sabuni's appointment as Minister for Integration and Gender Equality was met with protests from some Swedish Muslims, who accused her of Islamophobia and populism. A petition against her appointment was signed by the Muslim Association of Sweden, reportedly the largest organization representing Muslims in Sweden.

She resigned on 21 January 2013, citing that her successor should be prepared prior to the 2014 general election.

=== 2019–2022: Party leader ===
Sabuni was elected party leader of the Liberals in June 2019.

On 8 April 2022, Sabuni resigned as the party leader following a controversy stemming from her statement that she would flee Sweden for Norway if Sweden was ever invaded. She was the same day replaced by Johan Pehrson.

== Bibliography ==
- 2006 – Flickorna vi sviker: om hederskultur i Sverige. Stockholm: Folkpartiet. Libris 10213085
- 2010 – Det nya Sverige: [min vision : min väg]. Stockholm: Ekerlid. Libris 11856397. ISBN 9789170921513

== See also ==
- Gender equality

Political offices
Preceded by Jens Orback	Minister for Integration; 2006–2010	Succeeded by Erik Ullenhag
Preceded by Jens Orback	Minister for Gender Equality; 2006–2013	Succeeded by Maria Arnholm
Party political offices
Preceded by Jan Björklund	Leader of the Liberals; 2019–2022	Succeeded by Johan Pehrson
