= Suggestibility =

Inclination to accept the suggestions of others

Suggestibility is the quality of being inclined to accept and act on the suggestions of others. One may fill in gaps in certain memories with false information given by another when recalling a scenario or moment. Suggestibility uses cues to distort recollection: when the subject has been persistently told something about a past event, his or her memory of the event conforms to the repeated message.

A person experiencing intense emotions tends to be more receptive to ideas and therefore more suggestible. Generally, suggestibility decreases as age increases. However, psychologists have found correlations between individual levels of self-esteem and assertiveness and individual suggestibility; this finding led to the concept of a spectrum of suggestibility.

== Definition ==
Attempts to isolate a global trait of "suggestibility" have not been successful, due to an inability of available testing procedures to distinguish measurable differences between the following distinct types of "suggestibility":

- To be affected by a communication or expectation such that certain responses are overtly enacted, or subjectively experienced, without volition, as in automatism.
- Deliberately to use one's imagination or employ strategies to bring about effects (even if interpreted, eventually, as involuntary) in response to a communication or expectation.
- To accept what people say consciously, but uncritically, and to believe or privately accept what is said.
- To conform overtly to expectations or the views of others, without the appropriate private acceptance or experience; that is, to exhibit behavioral compliance without private acceptance or belief.

Wagstaff's view is that, because "a true response to [a hypnotic] suggestion is not a response brought about at any stage by volition, (Note: Subjects participating in hypnotic experiments commonly report that their overt responses to test-suggestions occurred without their active volition. For example, when given a suggestion for arm levitation, hypnotic subjects typically state that the arm rose by itself – they did not feel that they made the arm rise.) but rather a true non-volitional response, [and] perhaps even brought about despite volition", the first category really embodies the true domain of hypnotic suggestibility.

Self-report measures of suggestibility became available in 2004, and they made it possible to isolate and study the global trait.

== Examples ==
Suggestibility can be seen in people's day-to-day lives:

- Someone witnesses an argument after school. When later asked about the "huge fight" that occurred, he recalls the memory, but unknowingly distorts it with exaggerated fabrications, because he now thinks of the event as a "huge fight" instead of a simple argument.
- Children are told by their parents they are good singers, so from then on they believe they are talented while their parents were in fact being falsely encouraging.
- A teacher could trick his AP Psychology students by saying, "Suggestibility is the distortion of memory through suggestion or misinformation, right?" It is likely that the majority of the class would agree with him because he is a teacher and what he said sounds correct. However, the term is really the definition of the misinformation effect.

However, suggestibility can also be seen in extremes, resulting in negative consequences:

- A witness' testimony is altered because the police or attorneys make suggestions during the interview, which causes their already uncertain observations to become distorted memories.
- A young girl begins suffering migraines which lead to sleep deprivation and depression. Her therapist, a specialist in cases involving child abuse, repeatedly asks her whether her father had sexually abused her. This suggestion causes the young girl to fabricate memories of her father molesting her, which lead to her being placed in foster care and her father being tried on charges of abuse.

== Hypnosis ==
Hypnotic suggestibility is an individual trait reflecting the general tendency to respond to hypnosis and hypnotic suggestions. Research with standardized measures of hypnotic suggestibility has demonstrated that there are substantial individual differences in this variable.

The extent to which a subject may or may not be "suggestible" has significant ramifications in the scientific research of hypnosis and its associated phenomena. Most hypnotherapists and academics in this field of research work from the premise that hypnotic susceptibility or suggestibility — that is, the depth of hypnosis a given individual can achieve in a given context with a particular hypnotherapist and particular set of beliefs, expectations and instructions — is a factor in inducing useful hypnotic states.

Dr. John Kappas (1925–2002) identified three different types of suggestibility in his lifetime that have improved hypnosis:

Emotional suggestibility – A suggestible behavior characterized by a high degree of responsiveness to inferred suggestions that affect emotions and restrict physical body responses; usually associated with hypnoidal depth. Thus the emotional suggestible learns more by inference than by direct, literal suggestions.

Physical suggestibility – A suggestible behavior characterized by a high degree of responsiveness to literal suggestions affecting the body, and restriction of emotional responses; usually associated with cataleptic stages or deeper.

Intellectual suggestibility – The type of hypnotic suggestibility in which a subject fears being controlled by the operator and is constantly trying to analyze, reject or rationalize everything the operator says. With this type of subject the operator must give logical explanations for every suggestion and must allow the subject to feel that he is doing the hypnotizing himself.

However, it is not clear or agreed what suggestibility (i.e., the factor on hypnosis) actually is. It is both the indisputable variable and the factor most difficult to measure or control.

What has not been agreed on is whether suggestibility is:

- a permanent fixed detail of character or personality;
- a genetic or chemical psychiatric tendency;
- a precursor to or symptom of an activation of such a tendency;
- a learned skill or acquired habit;
- synonymous with the function of learning;
- a neutral, unavoidable consequence of language acquisition and empathy;
- a biased terminology provoking one to resist new externally introduced ideas or perspectives;
- a mutual symbiotic relation to the Other, such as the African conception of uBunthu or Ubuntu;
- related to the capacity of empathy and communication;
- a matter of concordant personal taste between speaker and hypnotist, and between listener and listener's like of, or use for, speaker's ideas;
- a skill or a flaw or something neutral and universal.

Conceptually, hypnotizability has always been defined as the increase in suggestibility produced by hypnosis. In practice, hypnotizability is measured as suggestibility following a hypnotic induction. The data indicates that these are different constructs. Although the induction of hypnosis increases suggestibility to a substantial degree, the correlation between hypnotic and non-hypnotic suggestibility approximates the reliability coefficients of so-called hypnotizability scales. This indicates that hypnotic susceptibility scales are better measures of waking suggestibility than they are of hypnotizability.

Existing research into the phenomena of hypnosis is extensive and randomized controlled trials predominantly support the efficacy and legitimacy of hypnotherapy, but without a clearly defined concept of the entity or aspect being studied, the level an individual is objectively "suggestible" cannot be measured empirically, and makes exact therapeutic outcomes impossible to forecast.

Moreover, it logically hinders the development of non-bespoke hypnotherapy protocol. On this latter point, it must be pointed out that while some persuasion methods are more universally effective than others, the most reliably effective method with individuals is to personalize the approach by first examining clients' motivational, learning, behavioral, and emotional styles, among others. Indeed, few hypnotherapists will not make taking case history from the clients they will be working with priority.

=== Autonomy ===
The intrigue of differences in individual suggestibility even crops up in the early Greek philosophers. Aristotle had an unconcerned approach:

"The most intelligent minds are those that can entertain an idea without necessarily believing it."

— Aristotle

This perhaps is a more accurate echo of the experience of practicing hypnotherapists and hypnotists. When anyone is absorbed in someone else's inspiring words as they outline an idea or way of thinking, the subjective attention is held because of the logic, the aesthetic, and the relevance of the words to one's own personal experience and motivations. In these natural trance states, like those orchestrated purposefully by a hypnotherapist, the 'critical faculties' are naturally less active when there is less to be naturally critical of.

It is perhaps the "necessarily believing it" part of the Aristotelian quote above that is problematic, as this conception of suggestibility raises issues pertaining to the autonomy of attributing belief to an introduced idea, and how this comes to take place.

=== Susceptibility ===
Popular media and layman's articles occasionally use the terms "suggestible" and "susceptible" interchangeably, with reference to the extent to which a given individual responds to incoming suggestions from another. The two terms are not synonymous, however, as the latter term carries inherent negative bias absent from the neutral psychological factor described by "suggestibility".

In scientific research and academic literature on hypnosis and hypnotherapy, the term "suggestibility" describes a neutral psychological and possibly physiological state or phenomena. This is distinct from the culturally biased common parlance of the term "suggestible". The term "susceptible" implies weakness or some increased danger to which one is more likely to become a victim. It therefore has a negative effect on expectation and itself is a hypnotic suggestion that suggestions must be noticed and guarded against. Both terms are often bound with undeserved negative social connotations not inherent in the word meanings themselves.

To be suggestible is not to be gullible. The latter pertains to an empirical objective fact that can be shown accurate or inaccurate to any observer; the former term does not. To be open to suggestion has no bearing on the accuracy of any incoming suggestions, nor whether such an objective accuracy is possible, as is the case with metaphysical belief.

While research from the 1960s indicated increased suggestibility under the influence of LSD among both mentally ill and healthy individuals, recent documents suggest that the CIA and Department of Defense have discontinued research into LSD as a means of mind control.

Some therapists may examine worries or objections to suggestibility before proceeding with therapy: this is because some believe there is a rational or learned deliberate will to hold a belief, even in the case of more convincing new ideas, when there is a compelling cognitive reason not to 'allow oneself' to be persuaded. Perhaps this can be seen in historical cases of mass hypnosis where also there has been media suppression. In the individual, unexamined actions are sometimes described by hypno- and psycho-therapists based on outgrown belief systems.

Hypnotic suggestions include terms, phrases, or whole concepts where to understand the concept includes making sense of a subjective sensation, or a framework for the appropriate response.... simple one-word forms of this include the word terrorism where to understand the concept, one must understand the notion of terror and then understand in the sentence that it is meant to refer to "that" given object.

=== Language acquisition ===
Cognition of a phrase must occur before the decision how to act next can occur: because the concepts must exist before the mind. Either they are suggested from the mind itself, or in response to introduced suggestions of concepts from outside – the world and its scenarios and facts, or suggestions from other people.

A suggestion may direct the thoughts to notice a new concept, focus on a specific area within the world, offer new perspectives that later may influence action-choices, offer triggers for automatic behavior (such as returning a smile), or indicate specific action types. In hypnotherapy the portrayed realistic experience of the client's requested outcome is suggested with flattery or urgency, as well as personalized to the client's own motivations, drives, and tastes.

=== Common experience of suggestions ===
Suggestions are not necessarily verbal, spoken, or read. A smile, a glare, a wink, a three-piece suit, a scientist's white coat, are all suggestive devices that imply more than the immediate action. A hypnotist uses techniques that use these instinctive "fillings-in of gaps" and changes to how we respond to a scenario or moment. In the therapy setting, a hypnotist or hypnotherapist will likely evaluate these automatic cognitive leaps, or dogma, or any self-limiting or self-sabotaging beliefs.

Being under the influence of suggestion can be characterized as exhibiting behavioral compliance without private acceptance or belief. That is, actions being inconsistent with one's own volition and belief system and natural unhindered action-motivations. This could hinder the autonomy, expression or self-determination of an individual. It could equally supersede emotions with rationally chosen, deliberate long-term results.

=== Experimental vs. clinical ===
The applications of hypnosis vary widely and investigation of responses to suggestion can be usefully separated into two non-exclusive broad divisions:

- Experimental hypnosis: the study of "experimental suggestion", of the form:

"What is it that my group of test subjects actually do when I deliver the precise standard suggestion ABC to each of them in the same experimental context?"
(i.e., given a fixed suggestion, what is the outcome?)

- Clinical hypnosis: the study of clinical suggestion directed at the question:

"What is it that I can possibly say to this particular subject, in this specific context, to generate my goal of having them do XYZ?" (I.e., given a fixed outcome, what is the suggestion?)

== Non-state explanations of hypnotic responsiveness ==
According to some theoretical explanations of hypnotic responses, such as the role-playing theory of Nicholas Spanos, hypnotic subjects do not actually enter a different psychological or physiological state; but, rather, simply acting on social pressure – and, therefore, it is easier for them to comply than to disobey. Whilst this view does not dispute that hypnotized individuals truly experience the suggested effects, it asserts that the mechanism this takes place by has, in part, been "socially constructed" and does not, therefore, require any explanation involving any sort of an "altered state of consciousness".

== Children ==
Children have developing minds that are constantly being filled with new information from sources all around them. This predisposes children towards higher levels of suggestibility, and as such children are an important area of suggestibility investigation. Researchers have identified key factors, both internal and external, that are strong markers for suggestibility in children.

=== Internal ===
- Age: Children have a remarkable ability to remember events in their lives. The real variability between ages in suggestibility is the amount of detail provided for an event. Memory detail will be great for older children. Some younger children may need help recalling past events with the help of an adult. The problem as it relates to suggestibility is when children, and even adults, blend previous knowledge of similar experiences into their recollection of a single event. Children, particularly younger children, are prone to including details that are similar yet unrelated to the specific event showing that the age of a person is critical in their susceptibility to influence.
- Prior knowledge: As mentioned before, the possession of prior knowledge that relates to an event can be particularly dangerous when dealing with child suggestibility. Prior knowledge, as it relates to suggestibility is the use of past experiences to help reconstruct past or current events. Prior knowledge of an event can actually be effective at producing accurate recall of a particular situation, but can also be equally as effective at producing false memories. Research showed that when presented with a previously familiar situation, children were likely to falsely recall events as if they had happened.
- Gist extraction: Although children are extremely likely to recall false memories when past events are similar to a current event, they will also recall false memory details that are seemingly unrelated to the event. Researchers named this phenomenon global gist, which is a representation that identifies connections across multiple events. Children will falsely recall information that fits with their representation of the events around them.

=== External ===
- Interviewer bias: Interviewer bias is the opinion or prejudice on the part of an interviewer, which is displayed during the interview process and thus affects the outcome of the interview. This happens when interviewers pursue only a single hypothesis that supports what they already think, and ignore any details that counter their hypothesis. The goal is not to get the truth, but to simply corroborate what is already believed. Interviewer bias is commonly experienced when extracting information from children.
- Repeated questions: It has been shown that asking children the same question over and over again in an interview will often cause the child to reverse their first answer, especially in yes or no questions. It is the child's belief that since the question is being repeated that they must have not answered correctly and need to change their answer.
- Interviewer's tone: Children are extremely perceptive of people's tones, especially in an interview situation. When an interviewer's tone dictates the questioning, a child is likely to construct memories of past events when they actually have no memory of that event. An example would be that when a positive tone is used, it has shown to produce more detailed accounts of events. However, it has also been shown to produce false information intended to appease the interviewer.
- Peer interactions: Children's accounts of events can be greatly distorted by information from their peers. In some cases, children who were not present for an event will later recall witnessing the event as well as details about the event. This information come from hearing about the event as described by their peers. These children may speak up in order to feel included.
- Repeating misinformation: Repeating misinformation is simply when an interviewer gives a child incorrect details of an event. This technique is used over several interviews and occurs several times within a single interview. It has been shown to have a great effect on the accuracy of a child's recollection of an event, and eventually, the misinformation will be included in the child's account of a given event.

=== Extreme events ===
In extreme events such as sexual abuse, extreme anxiety or mistreatment, children can in fact be greatly subjected to suggestibility. It is possible that a child may recall something that didn't actually happen or they are so traumatized that they do not want to think about what actually happened.

Little research has been carried out into the effects of anxious mood at the time of either the encoding of misleading post‐event information or the time of its possible retrieval, on subsequent suggestibility. Memory accuracy for non‐suggestible items was unaffected by the anxious mood induction. With respect to suggestibility, there was a strong effect of misleading information. This is just one example of how a highly emotional situation such as an anxiety attack can create suggestibility misconception.

Another example of research is that memory, suggestibility, stress arousal, and trauma-related psychopathology were examined in 328 3- to 16-year-olds involved in forensic investigations of abuse and neglect. Children's memory and suggestibility were assessed for a medical examination and venipuncture. Being older and scoring higher in cognitive functioning were related to fewer inaccuracies. In addition, cortisol level and trauma symptoms in children who reported more dissociative tendencies were associated with increased memory error. This again proves how a stressful or traumatic experience in young children can be affected by suggestibility.

== Other cases ==
It is claimed that sufferers of post-traumatic stress disorder (PTSD) and dissociative identity disorder (DID) are particularly suggestible. While it is true that DID sufferers tend to score to the higher end of the hypnotizability scale, there have not been enough studies done to support the claim of increased suggestibility.

Aspects of crowd dynamics and mob behavior, as well as the phenomenon of groupthink are further examples of suggestibility.

Common examples of suggestible behavior in everyday life include "contagious yawning" (multiple people begin to yawn after observing a person yawning) and the medical student syndrome (a person begins to experience symptoms of an illness after reading or hearing about it). Placebo response is also thought to be based on individual differences in suggestibility, at least in part. Suggestible individuals may be more responsive to various forms of alternative health practices that seem to rely upon patient belief in the intervention more than on any known mechanism. Studies of effects of health interventions can be enhanced by controlling for individual differences in suggestibility. A search of the Mental Measurements Yearbook shows no extant psychological test for this personality characteristic. The Gudjonsson Suggestibility Scale is questionable for this kind of purpose due to its narrow focus. In addition to health-related implications, persons who are highly suggestible may be prone to making poor judgments because they did not process suggestions critically and falling prey to emotion-based advertising.

== See also ==
- Crowd psychology
- Dependent personality disorder
- Gudjonsson Suggestibility Scale
- Gullibility
- Hypnotic susceptibility
- Self-fulfilling prophecy
- Stigmata
- The Seven Sins of Memory
