= Reykjavík Museum of Photography =

Museum in Reykjavík, Iceland

Coordinates: 64.149277°N 21.94165°W

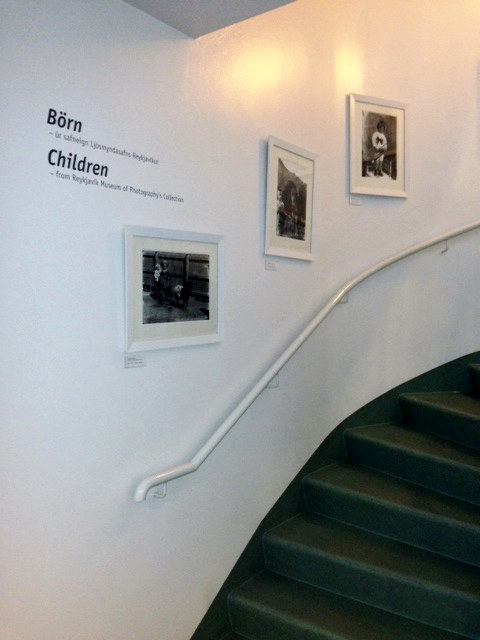
The stairway leading up to the museum

Reykjavík Museum of Photography (Icelandic: Ljósmyndasafn Reykjavíkur [ˈljouːsˌmɪntaˌsapn ˈreiːcaˌviːkʏr̥]), in Reykjavík, Iceland, preserves about five million photographs by professional and amateur photographers, from around 1870 to the present century. The collection includes studio portraits, and industrial, advertising, press, landscape and family photographs.

== History ==
The museum began in 1981 from a private collection and was originally called Ljósmyndasafnið hf. Its name was changed to the Reykjavík Museum of Photography in 1987, when the city of Reykjavík took over its operations. Since 2000, the museum has been at Tryggvagata, in the same building as the Reykjavik city library.

From 2014, the museum has been merged with three other museums belonging to Reykjavík: Vikin Maritime Museum, Minjasafn Reykjavíkur (the Settlement Exhibition and Árbær Open Air Museum) and Viðey. Two historical museums, Árbæjarsafn and Reykjavík 871±2, also belong to this consortium.

== Activities ==
The museum's aim is to "awaken the widest possible interest in the cultural role of photography".

The museum nominates Icelandic photographers for the following awards:

- Henri Cartier-Bresson Award
- Hasselblad Award
- Leopold Godowsky Jr. Color Photography Award
- Deutsche Börse Photography Prize

The museum has published a number of books. (Note: Móðirin í íslenskum ljósmyndum = Mothers in Icelandic Photographs (2000, ISBN 9979934557); Magnús Ólafsson: Ljósmyndari = Magnús Ólafsson: Photographer (2003, ISBN 997993459X). For several years starting in 1998, the museum held an annual lecture on 10 May in memory of the photographer Magnús Ólafsson (photographs); these were published the following year ("Reykjavik Museum of Photography ", Iceland Guest).)

In 2014 the museum was named one of "The ten best free museums in Europe" in The Guardian.

=== Collection ===
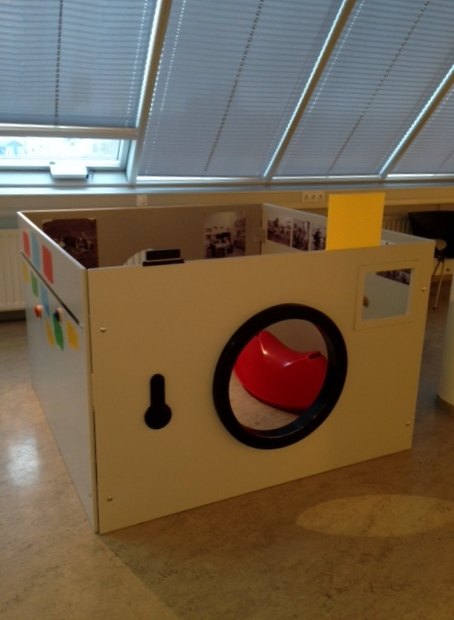
The camera is provided for the museum's youngest visitors.

The museum collects photographs and other material related to photographers of the Reykjavík area. It also acquires and preserves photographs, albums and other items of vernacular photographic culture.

=== Exhibitions ===
Each year, the museum holds about three main exhibitions and more than ten smaller shows.

A few highlights from previous exhibitions:

- Henri Cartier-Bresson – Paris (2001)
- Mary Ellen Mark – American Odyssey (2002)
- Viggo Mortensen – Skovbo (2008)
- André Kertész – Ma France (2010)
- Marc Riboud – 50 years of photography (2011)
- Ragnar Axelsson – Mirror of Life (2014)
- Lauren Greenfield – Girl Culture (2014–2015)
- Thomas Kellner – Black and White (2017)
