= Gísli Guðjónsson =

Icelandic psychologist

Gísli Guðjónsson CBE
- Born: Gísli Hannes Guðjónsson; 26 October 1947 (age 79); Reykjavík, Iceland
- Education: Brunel University London; University of Surrey
- Occupations: Academic, professor
- Known for: Authority on suggestibility and false confessions

Gísli Hannes Guðjónsson, CBE (born 26 October 1947) is an Icelandic-British academic, educator, forensic psychologist and former detective. He is Emeritus Professor at the Institute of Psychiatry of King's College London and a Professor in the Psychology Department at Reykjavik University. Gísli is specialized in suggestibility, false confessions and false memory syndrome.

== Biography ==
Gísli was born on 26 October 1947 to Guðjón Aðalsteinn Guðmundsson and Þóra Hannesdóttir. His twin brother joined the Reykjavík Criminal Investigation Police while he chose to study economics at Brunel University London (BSc, 1975), but changed to psychology whilst in his second year. He completed his studies at the University of Surrey (MSc, 1977; PhD, 1981). In 1982, together with MacKeith he coined the term memory distrust syndrome, to describe those who distrust their own memories and are motivated to rely on external (non-self) sources to verify the accuracy of memories.

In the 1990s, he worked as head of forensic psychology services and clinical psychologist to the Bethlem Royal Hospital and Maudsley Hospital.

He was appointed Commander of the Order of the British Empire (CBE) in the 2011 Birthday Honours for services to clinical psychology.

== Work ==
Gísli's expert testimony was the basis for the convictions of the Birmingham Six and Guildford Four being overturned. Since then, he has provided a report on the Lucy Letby case. He created the Gudjonsson Suggestibility Scale to measure how susceptible someone is to coercion during an interrogation. An author of several books, Gudjonsson was a coauthor on the American Psychology-Law Society (AP-LS) White Paper by Saul Kassin et al. (2010) titled "Police-induced confessions: Risk factors and recommendations."

== Selected list of publications ==
- Psychology brings justice: the science of forensic psychology (Crim Behav Ment Health. 2003;13(3):159-67)
- The Psychology of Interrogations and Confessions. A Handbook. Chichester: John Wiley & Sons. (2003)
- Forensic Psychology. A Guide to Practice (with Lionel Haward)
- The relationship between confabulation and intellectual ability, memory, interrogative suggestibility and acquiescence. (Personality and Individual Differences, 1995)
- The Gudjonsson Suggestibility Scales Manual. Hove, UK: Psychology Press. (1997)
- The Relationship Of Alcohol Withdrawal Symptoms To Suggestibility And Compliance. (Psychology, Crime & Law, June 2004, Vol. 10(2), pp. 169/177)
- The Psychology of False Confessions: Forty Years of Science and Practice (2018)

== See also ==
- Guðmundur and Geirfinnur case
- Memory distrust syndrome
- Perjury
