= Lars Eliasson =

Swedish politician (1914–2002)

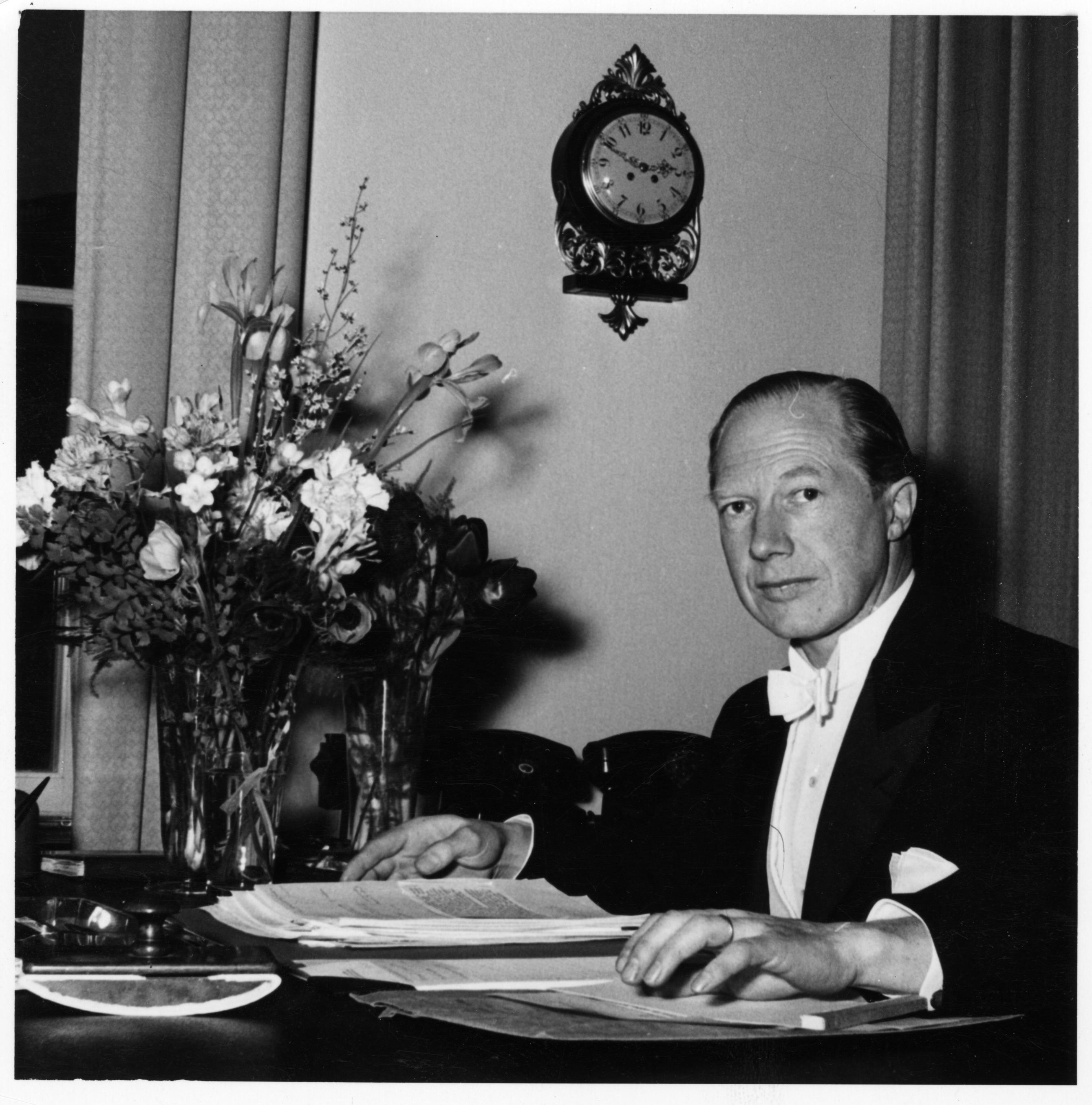
Lars Eliasson, 1957

Lars Eliasson (December 8, 1914 – June 5, 2002) was a Swedish politician. He was a member of the Centre Party. He was the party's first vice chairman 1957-69 and a member of the Parliament of Sweden 1952–1970. For a short time in 1957, he was a minister in the Government of Sweden, in the Second cabinet of Erlander.

He is the father of the later Member of Parliament Anna Eliasson.
