= Ingrid Burman =

Swedish politician (born 1952)

Ingrid Burman (born 4 November 1952) is a Swedish Left Party politician. She was a member of the Riksdag from 1994 until 2006.
