= Guðmundur and Geirfinnur case =

Missing persons case in Iceland

The Guðmundur and Geirfinnur case (Icelandic: Guðmundar- og Geirfinnsmálið) concerns the disappearances of Guðmundur Einarsson and Geirfinnur Einarsson in 1974 in Iceland. Six people were convicted of their alleged murders on the basis of confessions (sometimes called the Reykjavik confessions) extracted by the police after intense and lengthy interrogations, despite lacking the bodies of the victims, witnesses, or any forensic evidence.

In later years, most Icelanders believe the six were wrongfully convicted. On 27 September 2018, 44 years after the disappearances of Guðmundur and Geirfinnur, the Supreme Court of Iceland acquitted five of the six original suspects.

== Disappearances ==
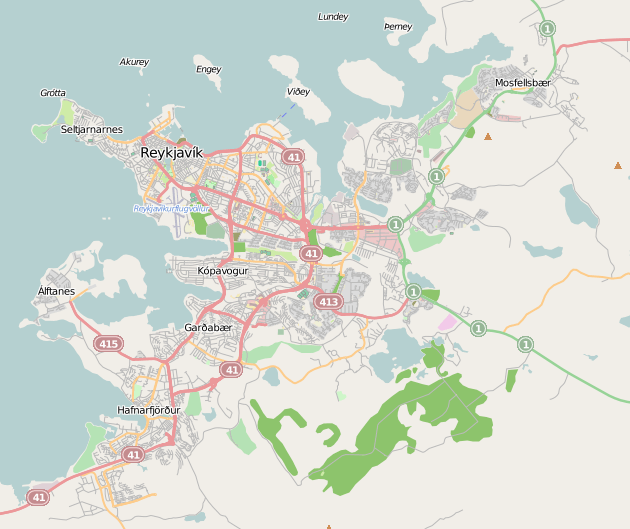
Greater Reykjavík, including Hafnarfjörður (southwest)

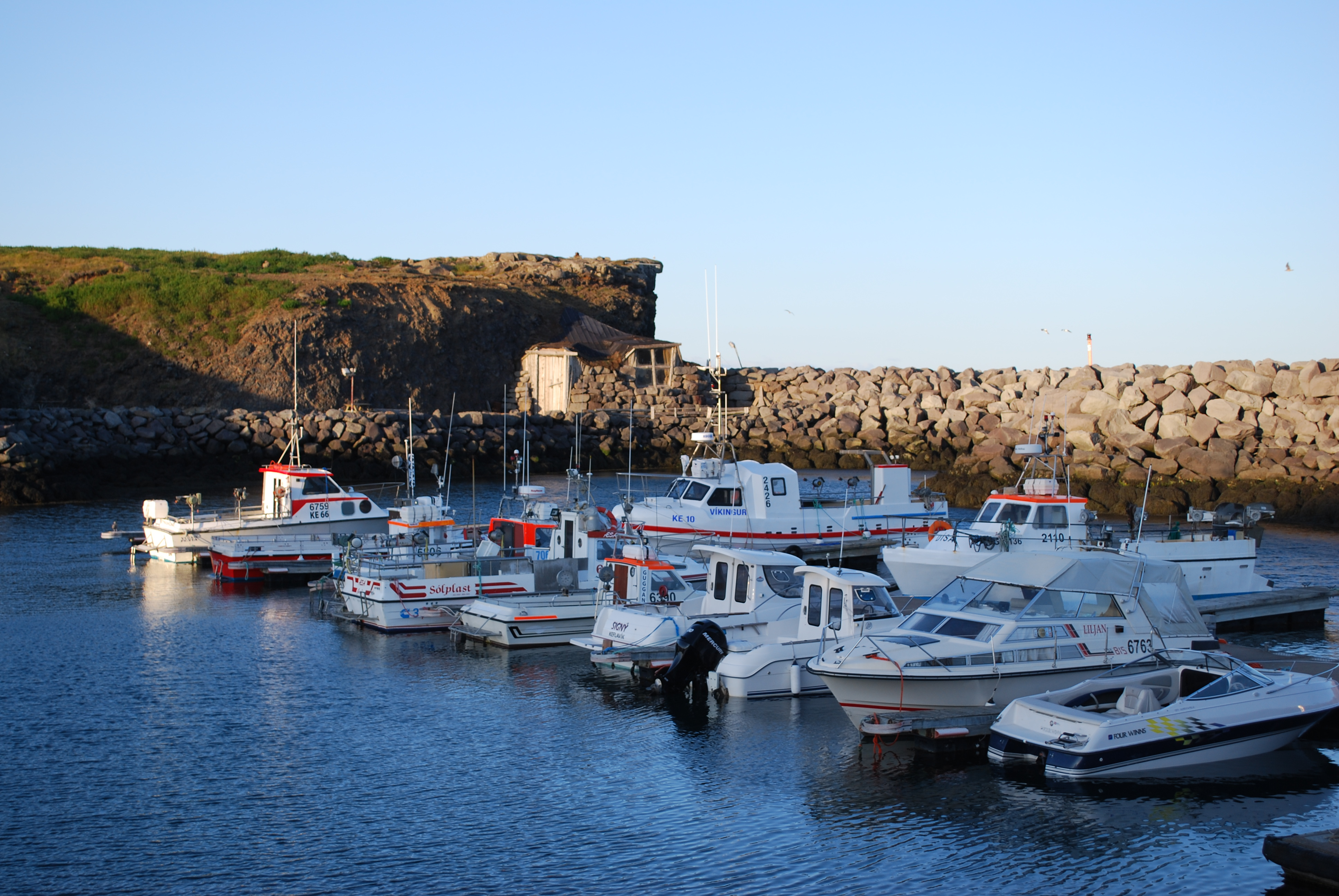
Boats docked at a harbour in Keflavík, Southern Peninsula

On the night of 26 January 1974, Guðmundur Einarsson, an 18-year-old labourer, was walking back from the community hall (Note: Icelandic: Alþýðuhúsið) in Hafnarfjörður (part of the Greater Reykjavík area) to his home, 10 kilometres (6.2 mi) away. He was last seen by a motorist after he nearly fell in front of a vehicle and has not been seen since. Ten months later, on 19 November 1974, Geirfinnur Einarsson, a 32-year-old construction worker unrelated to Guðmundur, received a phone call while at home and drove a short distance to the harbour cafe in Keflavík. He left the keys in the ignition, but failed to return to the car.

Extensive searches around the harbour and coast did not find a body, and, although the police in Iceland are regularly informed of people who disappear in snowstorms without motive, witnesses, forensic evidence, or bodies, a murder inquiry was opened. The Icelandic Police were put under intense public and media pressure to solve these cases.

== Interrogations and prosecutions ==
Six suspects, Sævar Ciesielski, Kristján Viðar Viðarsson, Tryggvi Rúnar Leifsson, Albert Klahn Skaftason, Guðjón Skarphéðinsson, and Erla Bolladóttir, eventually signed confessions to murder, even though they had no clear memory of committing the crimes. They had been kept in isolation, interviewed at length under pressure with little contact allowed with their lawyers. They were given drugs (Mogadon, diazepam and chlorpromazine) and subjected to sleep deprivation and water torture, particularly the alleged ringleader, Sævar, who had a fear of water. He also said that the drugs which were supposed to help him sleep had affected his memory.

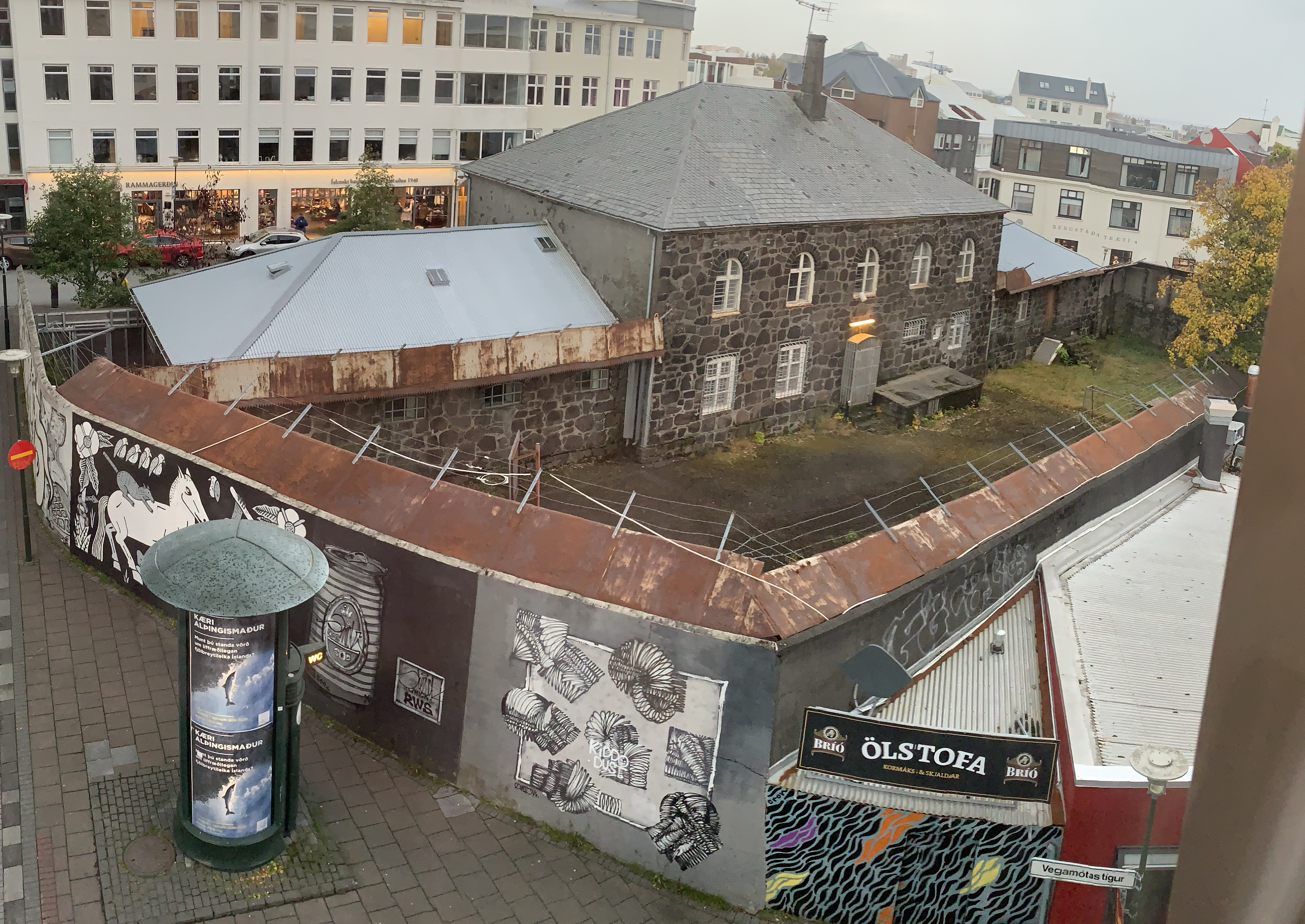
Hegningarhúsið, the now-closed prison where the suspects were interrogated.

The suspects said they signed the confessions in order to put an end to their solitary confinement. For example, Erla was held in solitary confinement for 242 days; two were kept under solitary confinement for over 600 days, and one of whom, Tryggvi, for 655 days – the longest solitary confinement outside of the Guantanamo Bay detention camp. Sævar was kept in custody for a total of 1,533 days.

In 1976, Einar Bollason, the chairman of the Icelandic Basketball Federation, sat innocent for 105 days in solitary confinement, along with Magnús Leópoldsson, Valdimar Olsen and Sigurbjörn Eiríksson, after Erla (Einar's half-sister) and other suspects had implicated them in the case.

Sævar, Kristján and Tryggvi were convicted for killing Guðmundur, while Albert was convicted for helping to hide the body. Sævar, Kristján and Guðjón were later convicted for killing Geirfinnur Einarsson, while Erla was convicted of perjury after she implicated her half-brother and others in the disappearance.

== Retrial ==
In 2013, an official police investigation report was handed to the office of the State Prosecutor. On 24 February 2017, the Interior Ministry's Rehearing Committee concluded that the cases of Sævar, Kristján, Tryggvi, Albert and Guðjón should be reheard by the Supreme Court of Iceland. However, the committee did not recommend a retrial for Erla's perjury case.

In its assessment, the commission's investigation into the Geirfinnur murder case of 1974 drew upon the inquiries, research and findings of Gísli Guðjónsson, who had established the concept of 'Memory Distrust Syndrome', whereby an individual subjected to extreme mental duress such as solitary confinement and sleep deprivation, would come to rely more on external forces, including interrogators, than their own memory. Eventually, this can lead to confessions of a false nature being offered in order to bring the ordeal to a close.

In 2015, the witness who had originally stated that Guðmundur had fallen in front of his car the night before January 27, 1974, was interrogated again. The witness' female companion testified that Guðmundur then got into the car. Upon departing from the car, she reported that Guðmundur was in a "deplorable condition". It was this witness who is said to have cast suspicion on Kristján and Sævar. Tryggvi reported in an interview that this witness confessed to him that he had spread suspicion on Kristján and Sævar due to not liking Kristján. Later in 2016, a man reported to the police that he had seen three men board a boat in Keflavík the day subsequent Geirfinnur's disappearance, two of which returned alone; the witness' girlfriend also stated that she had received a threatening phone call a few days later.

In February 2018, the State Prosecutor submitted a motion to the Supreme Court seeking to overturn the convictions of Sævar, Kristján, Tryggvi, Albert, Guðjón and Erla. On 27 September 2018, the Supreme Court accepted the motion to acquit all five men, but did not reverse Erla's conviction of perjury. The Icelandic government issued an official apology to the five men affected by the rulings and the families of those who had since died.

In May 2019, German politician Andrej Hunko submitted a request to the federal government to provide compensation to the now-acquitted five, due to the involvement of the German Federal Crime Office (BKA) in the original investigations. Hunko additionally requested that any surviving officials, as well as the families of those deceased, be asked to return the Icelandic medals granted to them as a result of the incorrect convictions. The federal government refused this request on the grounds that the implicated party from the BKA had been investigating as a private individual.

In October 2019, Halla Bergthóra Björnsdóttir, the Attorney General of Iceland, opened an investigation into the disappearance of Guðmundur and Geirfinnur, focusing on witness testimonies made in 2015 and 2016. In January 2020, Prime Minister Katrín Jakobsdóttir revealed that the Icelandic Government would provide compensation totaling 815 million Icelandic kronor (approximately 6 million euros) to those acquitted in the case or their families. In December 2022, Erla was additionally granted approximately €210,000 in damages due to her spending eight months in solitary confinement, with the Icelandic Government issuing a formal apology to her.

== Aftermath ==
Síðumúli Prison, the location where the suspects were placed in solitary confinement, was eventually shut down. The prison was heavily criticized by the Council of Europe's Committee for the Prevention of Torture in a 1994 report on Icelandic prisons, saying that inmates "benefitted from no prison regime worthy of the name; they were simply stored in the establishment." As of January 2023, Iceland continues to regularly employ the practice of pre-trial solitary confinement; according to a report by Amnesty International, despite the outcry created by the Guðmundur and Geirfinnur case, "not enough has changed and people are still being subjected to harm." Simon Crowther, a legal adviser at Amnesty, was quoted as saying:

"Icelandic authorities have been aware of the harms that solitary confinement causes, and their overuse of it, for years. Yet still, every year on average over 80 people, including children and some people with intellectual disabilities, are locked in cells alone for over 22 hours per day."

In a speech in Alþingi in 1998, then Prime Minister of Iceland, Davíð Oddsson, heavily criticized the investigation and prosecution of the case after the Supreme Court of Iceland ruled that it could not rehear the case. In 2018, it was revealed that Davíð had given Sævar financial support and advice to help him get the case reheard.

After battling cancer, Tryggvi Rúnar died in 2009, while Sævar Ciesielski died after an accident in Denmark in 2011. Kristján Viðar died in March 2021 due to unspecified causes, his family announcing his death on Facebook.

The case was made public in a BBC radio programme in May 2014, which discussed the apparent memory implantation. Professor of Psychiatry Gísli Guðjónsson, a former Icelandic detective and internationally renowned expert on suggestibility and false confessions, investigated this case and concluded:

"I've worked on miscarriages of justice in many different countries. I've testified in several countries - hundreds of cases I've done, big cases. I'd never come across any case where there had been such intense interrogation, so many interrogations and such lengthy solitary confinement. I mean I was absolutely shocked when I saw that."

Most Icelanders came to believe the case had been a bad miscarriage of justice, and the BBC described it as "one of the most shocking miscarriages of justice Europe has ever witnessed."

== Media ==
A documentary directed by Dylan Howitt called Out of Thin Air was released in 2017. The film was aired by the BBC. An Icelandic film called Imagine Murder (Icelandic: Lifun) was being made about the case in 2017. Directed by Egill Örn Egilsson, the film was scheduled to premiere in 2019. Buzzfeed Unsolved covered the case in 2019. Casefile also covered the case in March 2021.

== See also ==
- False confessions and forced confessions
- Human rights in Iceland
- List of people who disappeared mysteriously: 1910–1990
