= List of Swedish royal mistresses =

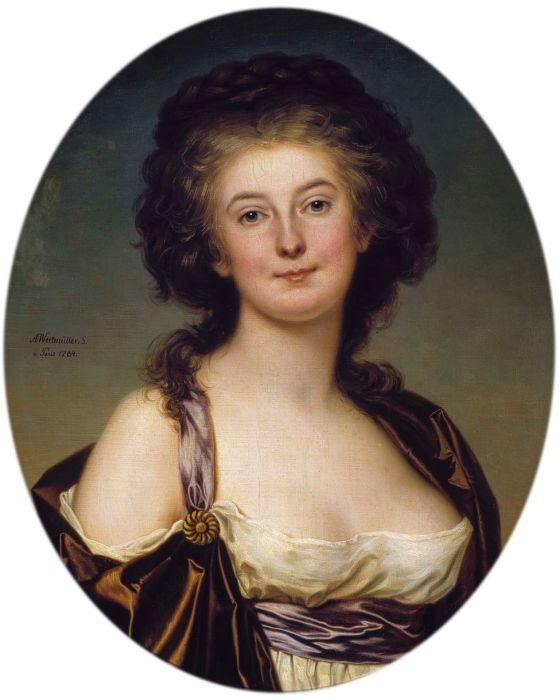
"Mademoiselle Charlotte Eckerman" (1784) painted by Adolf Ulrik Wertmüller.

The following were mistresses of Swedish royal family members.

== Medieval ==
- Jutta of Denmark (1246–1286/95), mistress of Valdemar
- 1464–1470: Kristina Abrahamsdotter (Finnish: Kristiina Abrahamintytär), mistress of Charles VIII before their marriage in 1470

== House of Vasa ==
=== Eric XIV of Sweden ===
- 1558–1561: Agda Persdotter
- 1561–1565: Karin Jacobsdotter
- 1565–1568: Karin Månsdotter, before their marriage in 1568

=== Others ===
- 1568–1573: Karin Hansdotter (Finnish: Kaarina Hannuntytär), mistress of John III of Sweden
- 1568–1578: Karin Nilsdotter, mistress of Charles IX of Sweden
- 1615–1616: Margareta Slots, mistress of Gustavus Adolphus of Sweden

== House of Palatinate-Zweibrücken ==
- 1646–1647: Märta Allerts, mistress of Charles X Gustav of Sweden

Unlike most of their predecessors and successors, Charles XI and his son Charles XII are not known to have had mistresses.

== House of Hesse: Frederick I of Sweden ==
- 1730–1743: Hedvig Taube
- 1745–1748: Catharina Ebba Horn

== House of Holstein-Gottorp ==
- 1760–1765 : Marie Marguerite Morel, mistress of Adolf Frederick of Sweden.
- 1778–1793 : Sophie Hagman, mistress of Prince Frederick Adolf of Sweden
- Maria Schlegel, mistress of Gustav IV Adolf

=== Charles XIII of Sweden ===
- 1771–1778 : Augusta Fersen
- 1779–1781 : Charlotte Eckerman
- 1781–1783 : Françoise-Éléonore Villain
- 1777–1797 : Charlotte Slottsberg.
- 1810–1818 : Mariana Koskull, also a mistress of his successor Charles XIV John of Sweden 1811-1823

== House of Bernadotte ==
=== Oscar I of Sweden ===
- 1819–1827: Jaquette Löwenhielm
- 1834–1840: Emilie Högquist

=== Charles XV of Sweden ===
- c. 1850: Laura Bergnéhr
- 1852–1860: Josephine Sparre
- 1858: Elise Hwasser
- 1860–1869: Johanna Styrell
- 1869–1872: Wilhelmine Schröder

=== Oscar II of Sweden ===
- 1880s: Marie Friberg
- Emma Elisabeth Hammarström

=== Alleged ===
- Kurt Haijby and Gustaf V
- Rosa Grunberg and Gustaf VI Adolf
- Camilla Henemark and Carl XVI Gustaf

== See also ==
- List of English royal mistresses
- List of Scottish royal mistresses
- Royal mistress
