= Magdalena Rudenschöld =

Swedish countess

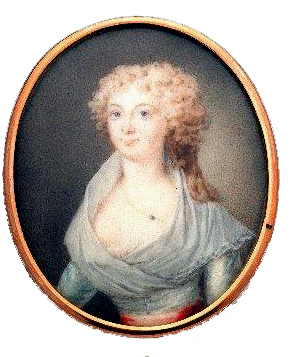
- Born: Magdalena Charlotta Rudenschöld; 1 January 1766; Sweden
- Died: 5 March 1823 (aged 57); Stockholm, Sweden
- Other names: Malla Rudenschöld and Malin Rudenschöld
- Occupations: Swedish nobility, lady-in-waiting.
- Known for: Standing trial for treason

Countess Magdalena Charlotta Rudenschöld (1 January 1766 – 5 March 1823 in Stockholm, Sweden) was a Swedish lady-in-waiting and conspirator. She was a key member of the Gustavian Armfelt Conspiracy who conspired to depose the regency government of Duke Charles. She was convicted of treason, pilloried, and sentenced to life in prison.

One of the others accused in the conspiracy said of her that her mistake was, "love, this violent passion, which among so many people of all ages overwhelms reason."

== Introduction to court ==
Magdalena Rudenschöld was born to riksråd Count Carl Rudenschöld (1698-1783) and Countess Christina Sofia Bielke (1727-1803): her mother was the granddaughter of the famous Christina Piper. When her father lost his parliament seat in 1766 and the family experienced economic difficulties, her mother received a secret allowance from the Kingdom of France in exchange for benefiting French interests through her influential connections. In 1784, Magdalena was appointed hovfröken (maid of honor) to the King's sister, Princess Sophia Albertine of Sweden. She replaced her older sister Caroline, a personal friend of the princess, who retired from her position after her marriage that year. Magdalena was described as beautiful, intelligent and passionate, and made a social success at court.

She was pursued by both Duke Charles, the King's brother, and by the nobleman Gustaf Mauritz Armfelt, the King's favorite. She turned the Duke down, but fell passionately in love with Armfelt. Armfelt had married Hedvig Ulrika De la Gardie in 1785, and made Rudenschöld his mistress. Rudenschöld claimed in her memoirs, that the King, who arranged the marriage of his favorite to De la Gardie, convinced her to advice Armfelt not to refuse the marriage for her sake, and that Armfelt agreed to the marriage after she assured him that it was her wish

She is believed to have borne him two children in secret: one of them was born in Quedlingburg in Germany, where she accompanied Sophia Albertina in 1787 and the second one in 1790. Both of the children, a daughter and a son, died soon after birth

== The conspiracy ==
In 1792, King Gustav III of Sweden was assassinated and his 14-year-old son Gustav IV (Adolf) ascended the throne. Duke Charles became his formal regent, although the duke's favorite, Gustaf Adolf Reuterholm, became the real regent, presiding over the guardian government. Armfelt, who had hoped to take a place in the government, abandoned Rudenschöld and left the country in 1793. He made secret plans to overthrow the guardian government with Russian assistance and install a new regime headed by himself.

After his departure, Armfelt wrote to Rudenschöld, who wanted him back as her lover, and upheld a correspondence, which became more and more political.

Armfelt instructed Rudenschöld to consult the medium Ulrica Arfvidsson, which she did three days after his departure from Sweden. Rudenschöld described the prediction in her correspondence to Armfelt. Arfvidsson consulted her coffee leaves and stated that the man of whom Rudenschöld was thinking (Armfelt) had recently left the country in anger over a child (the King) and a small man (the regent, Duke Charles), whom he would soon scare by an agreement with a woman with a non-royal crown on her head (Catherine the Great). She predicted that Armfelt risked to be revealed by the loss of a letter, which would be his ruin. As for Rudenschöld herself, Arfvidsson told her that she was observed and mentioned to Catherine the Great in letters by a fat man (Otto Magnus von Stackelberg (ambassador)), that she should be careful, and that great sorrows awaited her.

Magdalena Rudenschöld was not merely the tool of Armfelt in his plans: in their political correspondence, she expressed her own views and made her own suggestions in regard to the conspiracy She was often the guest at receptions on the Russian embassy in Stockholm, where ambassador Stackelberg appreciated her wit and made reports about her to Empress Catherine. At one occasion, Baron Carl Hierta made a remark about a paper claiming that the Russian monarch would turn her attention toward Sweden after having conquered Poland, and asked Rudenschöld: "Would you say we are unhappy enough to have a Swedish Potocki?", upon which she replied: "Why not? Those capable of murdering their King can also sell their country to foreign power", a remark which was evidently reported to the Russian Empress

Armfelt used Rudenschöld as a messenger, with the task to make contact with his followers, the young King and the Russian embassy. She is confirmed to have performed at least one of these missions.

The plan was to obtain permission from the King himself, Gustav IV Adolf, to depose of his guardian government. This permission was to be shown to the Russian Empress, who was then to support the coup with Russian military support. After the deposition of the government of Duke Charles, a new guardian government for the King would be established supported by Russia. Armfelt also promised to marry Rudenschöld.

At a ball, Magdalena Rudenschöld handed the under age monarch a letter, in which Armfelt asked for his permission to make any move necessary to assure the safety of the King. When Gustav IV Adolf asked Magdalena Rudenschöld if he could show the letter to his uncle, the regent of the guardian government Duke Charles, however, she refused and took the letter back. Upon a second attempt to obtain his permission, he turned the letter back with the words that Armfelt had his eternal friendship as long as he was loyal also to his uncle.

Magdalena Rudenschöld had been watched by the police because of her correspondence with Armfelt, who was known to belong to the opposition, and because she was known to participate in secret meetings with a group of men, of whom some were known to have acted as the spies of Armfelt during his time as the favorite of Gustav III. This group was consistent of Johan Albrecht Ehrenström, his brother colonel lieutenant Nils Albrecht Ehrenström, colonel lieutenant Johan August Sandels, colonel lieutenant Johan Otto Lillje, the restaurant owner Forster and the writer major K. von Holthusen. Rudenschöld was, by all accounts, the main actor of the plot in Sweden, while the others were assigned by Armfelt to act as her assistants.

The correspondence of Rudenschöld and Armfelt, however, fell into the hands of acting-regent Reuterholm and regent-in-name Duke Charles through the Hamburg post office, which had been making copies of the letters and selling them. Reuterholm had Rudenschöld arrested on the night of 18 December 1793. She was one of the first of the conspirators to be detained. Rudenschöld had burned some of her papers, but love letters from the persistent Duke Charles were found amongst her remaining documents. Armfelt's attempt to depose the government and take over had been discovered.

== Trial and verdict ==
At first, the evidence against Rudenschöld was not convincing and she was able to defend herself with intelligence and force. She was subjected to intense pressure and housed, she said, "in a terrifying prison, where I saw neither sun nor moon". When Armfelt's estate was searched, however, 1,100 of her letters to him were found there. In several of them, she expressed contempt towards Duke Charles and Reuterholm, which worsened her position. The regent already held a grudge against her for refusing his advances and Reuterholm took offense at her judgement of him.

Eight of her love letters to Armfelt were printed and published by the regent and Reuterholm with the title, "In the old King's House imprisoned a lady, known as Magdalena Charlotta daughter of Carl, letters to the traitor Baron Armfelt, known as Gustaf Mauritz, son of Magnus, about their love adventures". In them, she mentioned her attempt to have an abortion, with the support of Armfelt, after having been made pregnant by him. The overwhelming hostility shown to her by the Duke and Reuterholm also gained her public sympathy, however, when Rudenschöld was confronted with better evidence in April 1794, she confessed, saying she had only participated because of her unlimited confidence in Armfelt.

Princess Sophia Albertina intervened and asked the regent to show mercy, and she avoided being charged for abortion, which had been suggested at first.

On 22 September 1794 Magdalena Rudenschöld was convicted and sentenced to death for treason, together with Armfelt, in his absence (being still abroad), and two other co-conspirators, Ehrenström and Aminoff. Her punishment was commuted to public pillorying, followed by life imprisonment. Chancellor Fredrik Sparre suggested that she be whipped, which was initially approved by Reuterholm, but this was met with indignation by the public, which thereafter nicknamed him "Whipping chancellor".

== Punishment ==
She was stripped of her last name and her status as a noble, as were Armfelt and all the other accomplices that had been noble. In prison documents she was called "Magdalena, daughter of Carl, former Lady." The following day, Rudenschöld was taken to the gallows on the square, which was described as "a heart-aching spectacle". She was dressed in a grey skirt and a black top and had her hair down. She stood with her head held high and drank two glasses of water. The audience was reported to have felt sorry for her, according to Hedwig Elizabeth Charlotte of Holstein-Gottorp, because of, "her youth, her tragic fate and possibly because of the remains of her former beauty". After her reprieve from hanging, a carriage came to take her to jail and she fainted, according to writer Märta Helena Reenstierna "with the same grace and decorum as Mrs. Olin once had in Acus and Galathea" (the opera). Reportedly, people were overheard saying that the regent's lover, Charlotte Slottsberg, should have been standing on the platform instead of Rudenschöld

One of Rudenschöld's own friends, Count A.F. Skjöldenbrand also described the event: "Only a few of the mob began to shout at her, but Silfverhielm (Commander of the Guard) ordered the guards to silence them". She was supposed to have had an iron collar around her neck, but when the executioner held it up, she shivered and shrugged backwards, after which he

"let down his hands, and she stepped forward to the pole without an iron around her neck, where she stood as pale as a dead body for about twenty minutes until her sentence was commuted, after which she fainted and was taken away as if dead".

Rudenschöld wrote about her arrival in the prison workhouse:

"I was placed in a rental carriage surrounded by guards. I remained unconscious all the way to the workhouse, some distance from Hornstull, and did not open my eyes until the afternoon, where I found myself alone lying on the floor in a dark cell with a bowl of water and a glass of wine beside me. I had not eaten that whole day. When I touched the glass I heard the shout 'she is still alive!'. I looked up to the window and saw outside all the workhouse prisoners, watching me. I wanted to rise and remove myself from their sight, but found myself unable to move, and fell back to the floor."

Two-and-a-half years later, in November 1796, Rudenschöld was released from jail under Reuterholm's order, as he had wanted to release her before the young King was declared of legal majority later that year and pardoned her himself.

When she left the workhouse, she wrote on the prison wall (in French):

Élégie
   
Que le bonheur arrive lentement !
Que le bonheur s’éloigne avec vitesse !
Durant le cours de ma triste jeunesse,
Si j’ai vécu, ce ne fut qu’un moment.
Je suis puni de ce moment d’ivresse.
L’espoir qui trompe a toujours sa douceur,
Et dans nos maux du moins il nous console;
Mais loin de moi l’illusion s’envole,
Et l’espérance est morte dans mon cœur.
Ce cœur, hélas ! que le chagrin dévore,
Ce cœur malade et surchargé d’ennui,
Dans le passé veut ressaisir encore
De son bonheur la fugitive aurore,
Et tous les biens qu’il n’a plus aujourd’hui;
Mais du présent l’image trop fidèle
Me suit toujours dans ces rêves trompeurs,
Et sans pitié la vérité cruelle
Vient m’avertir de répandre des pleurs.
J’ai tout perdu : délire, jouissance,
Transports brûlants, paisible volupté,
Douces erreurs, consolante espérance,
J’ai tout perdu; l’amour seul est resté.

 

== Later life ==
She was given back her name and the property, the small manor Stenstugu gård on Gotland, as compensation for her loss of a pension. For the first year, however, she was not allowed to leave the island.

On 5 July 1798 Rudenschöld gave birth to a son, Eric Ekmansdorff Karlsson, who later became an officer in Finland. His father was Rudenschöld's servant, "a young, strong and beautiful lad", whom she openly lived with. However, the relationship ended unhappily, and he is said to have treated her badly. In 1801, she moved to Switzerland and was taken under the protection of Germaine de Stael, at the recommendation of Armfelt, who also arranged for her son to be educated in Saint Petersburg in Russia and supported her financially. She was often seen in Coppet, and was described as charming but serious.

In 1812, she returned to Sweden and lived in the household of her brother, Thure Gabriel; acting as governess to his children. Socially, she was described as easy-going but suspicious at this point and unwilling to talk about her past. Eventually, she moved to Stockholm, where she died in 1823.

== In fiction ==
Magdalena Rudenschöld was the subject of the novel Kärleks ljuva plåga : En roman om Magdalena Rudenschöld (The Sweet Torment of Love: A novel about Magdalena Rudenschöld) by Per-Martin Hamberg (1974).

== See also ==
- Brita Tott
- Anna Leuhusen
- Drottningens juvelsmycke
