= Julie Eckerman =

Swedish courtesan and spy

Catharina Juliana "Julie" Eckerman (1765–1800), was a Swedish courtesan and spy. She is most known as the kept lover of riksråd count Carl Sparre, a relationship which attracted attention and was used by the opposition of Sparre during his political career.

== Life ==
She was born to the writer Catharina Ahlgren and Bengt Edvard Eckerman, cavalry master of the Royal Scanian Husars, and the sister of Charlotte Eckerman. Her parents separated in 1768 because of her father's adultery and after he had refused to acknowledge her youngest brother. At least she and her sister was brought up with their mother. They were given a fine education and was tutored in the French language. However, the home was poor, and Eckerman later describe that her childhood, though cultivated, was miserable as far as the economy was concerned. Both Julie and her sister Charlotte were active as courtesans or high class prostitutes from an early age. Among her clients were a certain Müller, secretary at the German legation in Stockholm, whom she reportedly used as a spy with the Russian ambassador, Andrey Razumovsky.

In 1780, she became the mistress of riksråd count Carl Sparre, who was known as a libertine, especially after having been widowed by Ulrika Strömfelt; from 1785, she lived openly with him at his Lustschloss Bellevue, officially with the title house keeper. Sparre's political advisories accused him of having wasted the funds he collected through his office on Julie Eckerman, who was said to control his actions and accepted commissions from supplicants who wished to affect him. This was illustrated by a famous political pamphlet.

In 1789, Sparre discontinued the relationship because he planned to remarry, and arranged a marriage for Eckerman with Nils Björkegren, who was described as a beautiful youth and whom he had made mayor of Linköping.
