= Magdalena Lundblad =

Swedish ballet dancer

Magdalena Lundblad (1753–1786), was a Swedish ballet dancer.

She was regarded as one of the elite members of the Royal Swedish Ballet in 1773–86. Alongside Charlotte Slottsberg, she was one of the first native elite members of the Royal Ballet, which initially mainly employed foreign dancers. Carl von Fersen referred to Magdalena Lundblad and Charlotte Slottsberg as the only native dancers capable of replacing the ballerina Elisabeth Soligny.
