= Märta Helena Reenstierna =

Swedish diarist (1753–1841)

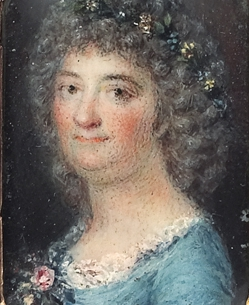
- Born: 1753
- Died: 1841 (aged 87–88)
- Other names: Märta Helena von Schnell, Årstafrun (English: "The Årsta lady")
- Known for: Diarist
- Spouse: Christian Henrik von Schnell (1733–1811)
- Children: Hans Abraham von Schnell (1780–1812)

Notes
- Her diaries are considered as an important source for the life of the mistress at a Swedish manor in the late 18th century and early 19th century.

Märta Helena Reenstierna (16 September 1753 – 12 January 1841; married name: von Schnell), known as Årstafrun (The Årsta lady), was a Swedish diary writer. Her diaries were written in the period 1793–1839, and are kept at the archives of Nordiska museet in Stockholm. They were published in 1946–1953 as Årstadagboken (The Årsta Diary). They are considered as a valuable cultural historical document of the everyday life of the people at a Swedish manor of her epoch.

== Biography ==
Märta Helena Reenstierna was the daughter of lieutenant Abraham Reenstierna and Catharina Maria von Köhler. On 6 June 1775, she married Cavalry Captain Christian Henrik von Schnell (1733–1811), who was twenty years older than her. She had eight children between 1776 and 1787, though by the time she began her diary in 1793, only her son Hans Abraham (1780–1812) was alive to reach adulthood.

She did not begun her diary until 1793, and the first eighteen years of her marriage are therefore not described. However, the spouses seem to have had an active social life, as in retrospect, she described her spouse as: "formerly a resplendent host and an brilliant escort, he is now approaching is 60th birthday and now resembles a sour and sad old man, who detests society and activates himself only by tending to economical matters". Reenstierna was a personal friend and benefactor of Bellman, whom she helped financially on several occasions.

Årsta was a relatively large estate with, among other things, cultivated tobacco. She was widowed in 1811, and lost her son in a riding accident the year after. At this time, her brother royal equerry Johan Abraham Reenstierna became a tenant of the estate.

Reenstierna continued with the diary and the managing of the estate until she became blind in 1839.

== Work ==
Her diary depicts the details of everyday life of the people of all classes at the estate and its surrounding countryside, the harvests, the tending of animals, household tasks and the weather. It focuses on the economy and management of the estate but also its everyday life as well as the more festive occasions: its close vicinity to the capital also offers accounts of historical political events as well as news of fashion and pleasure. The diary describes her own interest in literature and the theater. Her language is described as realistic, dry, sober and to the point, focused on describing facts as they were rather than to write of personal reflections or thoughts, and it is clear that she is an efficient manager of a big household and aware of her own value. Though herself noble, it appears that her circle of acquaintances were mostly from the burgher middle class.

Her relationship to her staff was apparently good, though she often mentions how punishments were necessary because of the frequent use of alcohol among her servants. She also includes historical political events in nearby Stockholm, which lay near enough to be visited often: for example, she witnessed the punishment of the Armfelt conspirators in 1794, among them Magdalena Rudenschöld. Except for herself, her spouse, her son and later her brother were the people most closely described in her diary. Being her only child to reach adulthood, she was deeply attached to her son. After the death of her spouse in 1811, and the death of her son in 1812, her closest relative were her brother, who became a tenant at Årsta.

== In fiction ==
Märta Helena Reenstierna was portrayed in the novel På Årstafruns tid (English: The times of the Årsta lady) by Lars Widding (1969).
