= Charlotte Eckerman =

Swedish opera singer, actress and courtesan

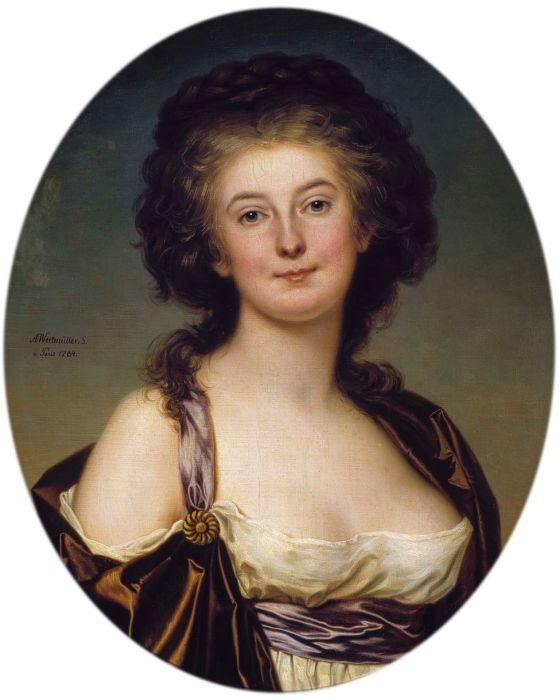
"Mademoiselle Charlotte Eckerman" (1784) painted by Adolf Ulrik Wertmüller. It is believed that the painting was ordered by Gustaf Mauritz Armfelt, with whom she had a relationship at the time.

Beata Charlotta "Charlotte" Eckerman (1759 – 16 January 1790 in Stockholm), was a Swedish opera singer and actress born a Blästad Gård. She was also a very well known courtesan during the Gustavian era, and the official royal mistress of Charles XIII of Sweden from 1779 to 1781.

== Life ==
Charlotte Eckerman was the daughter of Bengt Edvard Eckerman, cavalry captain of the Royal Scanian Husars, and the writer Catharina Ahlgren. Her father was the cousin of Carl Fredrik Ekerman, speaker of the burghers in the Swedish parliament, and her mother was at one point the kammarfru of the queen, Louisa Ulrika of Prussia.

In the custody of her father after her parents divorce, she was described as more or less an orphan. She had two brothers and a sister, as well as several half-siblings by her fathers second marriage and by her mother. She and her sister did not get along with their stepmother, and appears to have moved from home early on. Her sister Julie Eckerman (1765–1801) was also a courtesan and the mistress of nobleman count Carl Sparre, governor of Stockholm.

=== Opera singer ===
Charlotta Eckerman was engaged at the Stenborg Company in 1774, and as a singer at the Royal Swedish Opera in Bollhuset in Stockholm in 1776–81.

In 1774, she and several other actors of the Stenborg Company was called to Gripsholm Castle by Gustav III, who had recently created the Swedish Royal Opera and was in search of talent. The king discovered that she had a talent for drama, and gave the courtier Maria Aurora Uggla, the star of the nobility's amateur theatre at the royal court, the task to instruct her in the part of Mechtild in the opera Birger jarl by Gyllenborg and Adlerbeth, after the part had been refused by Elisabeth Olin. Charlotte Eckerman made a great success in the part at the Royal Opera in Stockholm, and was called in by the audience: Prince Charles started to shout "Miss Uggla! Miss Uggla!", after which the audience applauded also Maria Aurora Uggla in her box as well as the author Gyllenborg for having instructed Eckerman in the part.

Eckerman was given a contract as a singer at the opera in 1776, and was active there until 1781, during which she was "an adored actress and singer". After having been judged as unfit for the ballet, she was given a place in the choir. Though her voice was weak, she was described as beautiful and vivid. While described as failed dancer and a mediocre singer, she was considered a well capable actress.

Charlotte Eckerman was, alongside Ulrica Rosenlund, much recommended for her dramatic talent and belonged to the members of staff in the first national Opera, who proved their talent not only as singers, but also as actors in talking parts, the theatrical performances that were sometimes given at the opera before the opening of the royal theatre in 1788.

=== Royal mistress ===
Charlotta Eckerman was from 1774 active as a courtesan. In 1779, she was made the official mistress of the king's brother duke Charles, the future Charles XIII of Sweden. Rumour claimed that Charles took Eckerman as a mistress upon the advice of his brother, Prince Frederick Adolf of Sweden, who thought it more polite to Charle's consort than his first choice; countess Maria Sophia Rosenstierna, who was the courtier of his consort. Duke Charles had, in any case, a more unofficial relationship with the ballerina Charlotte Slottsberg, who was however not given any official recognition. The relationship between Charles and Eckerman caused a scandal because of sympathy toward the consort of Charles, Hedvig Elisabeth Charlotte of Holstein-Gottorp, who was very popular. Duke Charles tried to influence king Gustav III to take an official mistress, and Eckerman suggested the French adventurer Madame Monzouve (or de Monzouvre), but the plot does not seem to have succeeded.

In 1781, Charles ended the connection. It was rumoured that the relationship ended because of the scandal, but in reality, it was more likely because Charles regarded it as necessary after having become inducted into the Freemasons. However, this does not seem to be correct, as Charles soon entered into another love affair with Françoise-Éléonore Villain.

In 1781, Eckerman became involved in a conflict with the king, Gustav III of Sweden. Eckerman was disliked by the king, as it was said, because she did not admire him and because she had a talent for caricaturing the current ideals. When her affair with the king's brother ended and she could no longer count on his protection, the king arranged for her dismissal from the Opera and had her banished from Drottningholm. Furthermore, he ordered Baron Carl Sparre, the governor of the city of Stockholm, to have her arrested and sent to the Långholmens spinnhus. As a reason, he claimed that she had given birth to a child and murdered it in secrecy, and that she had taken part in the spreading of rumours regarding the legitimacy of the heir to the throne. There were at the time many rumors that the crown prince was fathered by the stable master Count Adolf Fredrik Munck af Fulkila on the orders of the king, rumors which were spread by the king's own mother, Louisa Ulrika of Prussia, and increased when Munck were given gifts by the king and the queen. Sparre, who was the lover of Eckerman's sister Julie, was aware of the king's dislike of Eckerman. Sparre investigated the accusations and could find nothing to indicate that she had committed child murder. Charlotte Eckerman denied the accusation that she was to have spread rumours regarding the crown prince's legitimacy, and claimed that it was the king's page, Georg Johan De Besche as the guilty party. De Besche was to have said, that the gift the queen had given to Munck was well worthy of the birth of an heir to the throne.

Sparre refused to arrest her, and pointed out that it was against Swedish law for a monarch to threaten the freedom of a citizen without a legal verdict from a court. The whole affair ended in silence. Eckerman was not sent to jail, and the king did not mention it further. Eckerman left the country shortly afterward, possibly banished by the monarch.

=== Later life ===
Charlotte Eckerman later lived in Paris in France, where she worked as a courtesan under the name Madame Ahlgren. During this period, she was portrayed by the famous artist Adolf Ulrik Wertmüller: the painting was likely ordered by her then admirer Gustaf Mauritz Armfelt.

In 1784, Gustaf Mauritz Armfelt arranged a meeting with Gustav III during his official visit to France, during which she was reconciled with the monarch and allowed to return to Sweden. During these years, she made a journey through Italy, which was unusual for a single woman in this period.

She returned to Sweden in 1786. Charlotte Eckerman now became active as a spy. She received an allowance from the authorities in exchange for spying on the foreign ambassadors stationed in Stockholm in her capacity of a courtesan. At the time of her death, she was the mistress of the Dutch ambassador to Sweden, baron van der Bork.

She died while being magnetized by Anders Sparrman.

== Fiction ==
Charlotta Eckerman is portrayed as the main protagonist in the novel Kurtisanen (The Courtesan) by Anna Laestadius Larsson (2019).

== See also ==
- Charlotte Slottsberg
- Sophie Hagman
- Maria Kristina Kiellström
