= Catharina Ahlgren =

Swedish writer and journalist

- Born: 1734; Sweden
- Died: 1800 (aged 65–66)
- Other names: Catharina Bark, Catharina Eckerman
- Occupations: writer, poet, translator, managing editor, journalist.
- Known for: feminist and writer

Catharina Ahlgren (1734 – c. 1800) was a Swedish proto-feminist poet and publisher, and one of the first identifiable female journalists in Sweden.

She was the publisher and chief editor of a number of different women's periodicals in Stockholm and in Finland between 1772 and 1783, and the publisher of the first periodical (as well as the first one by a woman) in Finland Om konsten att rätt behaga (1782). She is also known for her correspondence with Hedvig Charlotta Nordenflycht. Ahlgren was a leading person in the Swedish "female literary world of the 1750s and 1770s".

== Biography ==
Catharina Ahlgren was the daughter of Anders Ahlgren, governor of Östergötland, and Laurentia Juliana Liungenfeldt. Through her sister, she was the sister-in-law of Johan Gustaf Halldin, chancellor of the National Library of Sweden.

According to V. Örnberg, she was at one point a kammarfru (chamberer) in the court of the queen Louisa Ulrika, but lost her position because of some kind of intrigue: "Chamberlady at court but soon lost her position because of plotting, managed a book shop that failed. Made translations and wrote literary things."

Catharina Ahlgren's first marriage was to Bengt Edvard Eckerman, cavalry master of the royal Scanian Husars. During her first marriage, she had the daughters Charlotte Eckerman and Julie Eckerman and the sons Bengt Gustaf and Christopher. Her first marriage was reportedly troubled by economic difficulties and her youngest son were not acknowledged by her spouse as his. The marriage ended in a divorce in 1770. She married for the second time to the book printer journeyman Anders Bark or Barck.

She moved with her second spouse to Finland, possibly in 1775, and are listed as a resident in Åbo in 1782. Her second marriage also ended in a divorce. At the death of her eldest daughter Charlotte in 1790, she was one of the beneficiaries of the will. In 1796, she settled with her youngest daughter Julie in Linköping.

Her contemporary, the orientalist and writer Jonas Apelblad, listed her in his writers dictionary as a strong and gifted personality, "[f]emina potens, sed ingenio plena" ("a forceful woman, but full of talent") who did not live a more peaceful life with her second spouse then she had with her first.

== Literary career ==
=== Translator and poet ===
Catharina Ahlgren reportedly became known as a poet and translator in the 1750s literary world before she had anything formally published. She was a personal friend of the famed poet Hedvig Charlotta Nordenflycht, and their correspondence is preserved. While her friend Nordenflycht wrote under the pseudonym "Herdinnan i Norden" (Shepherdess of the North), Catharina Ahlgren wrote under the name "Herdinnan i Ahl-Lunden" (Shepherdess of the Alder-Grove).

She was active as a translator of both poetry and novels from the English, French and German languages. Among her translations were the German poem Die Prüfung Abrahams by Christoph Martin Wieland, and the English novel The Distressed Wife, or the history of Eliza Wyndham.

She debuted as a poet with her French language poem Au jour de l'illustre naissance de sa majestee notre adourable Reine Le 24 Jullet, dedicated to the queen, Louisa Ulrika, on the queen's birthday in 1764.

=== Journalist and publisher ===
Likely through her second marriage, Catharina Ahlgren acquired a printing press, which she managed for a period. Among the writers she published was Hedvig Charlotta Nordenflycht.

On 29 October 1772, Catharina Ahlgren published and edited the periodical Brefwäxling emellan twänne fruntimmer, den ena i Stockholm och den andra på landet i åskillige blandade ämnen ('Correspondence between two ladies, one in Stockholm and the other one in the country, about a number of various subjects'), under the signature Adelaide. This was a feminist essay publication, written in the form of a debate i letters between two female signatures, in which she argued in favor of a social conscience, democracy and gender equality, and recommended solidarity between women as a protection against male guardianship and superiority. She stated that the only way to reach true love within a relationship is to be equals, adding that as men so often want to rule over women, it is much harder to retain friendship with them than with another woman. She discussed love and friendship, upbringing and education, monarchy and religion.

In February 1773, the essay was renamed Brefväxling emellan Adelaide och någre wittre snillen i omwäxlande ämnen ('Correspondence between Adelaide and some literary geniuses in various subjects'), and later that year Fortsättning af Adelaides brefwäxling, angående Fru Windhams historie ('Adelaide's continuing correspondence, concerning the history of Mrs Windham').

Catharina Ahlgren is also presumed to be the publisher and author of the noted periodical De Nymodiga Fruntimren, eller Sophias och Bélisindes Tankespel ('Modern Women, or the thought play of Sophia and Belisinde'), which were written in the same fashion. This primarily promoted women's education as a mean of reform in women's position. She criticized the dominating French language in the customary education of females, as this was used for nothing more than reading of romantic novels, and advocated that girls should learn English instead, so they could be able to take part in scientific literature, such as history and geography, which was normally only published in that language.

Catharina Ahlgren also played a pioneer role in Finland, where she lived in Åbo from at least 1782 onward. She is identified as the editor behind Om konsten att rätt behaga ('Of the Art to Please Properly'), which was, in fact, the first periodical published in Finland. She discontinued Om konsten at rätt behaga officially because of health reasons. In her farewell she wrote: "You may see, gentlemen, how much I wished to copy you." In 1783 she published her last periodical, Angenäma Sjelwswåld ('Pleasant Defyings').

== Legacy ==
During the Swedish Age of Liberty and the Gustavian era, many periodicals were published discussing important issues in society, notably the Then Swänska Argus.

These periodicals were often written in form of a debate or a correspondence between two anonymous signatures. Some of them also took up the topic of the role of women in society and gender equality, the earliest one being Samtal emellan Argi Skugga och en obekant Fruentimbers Skugga by Margareta Momma in 1738-39. This presaged first-wave feminism in the English-speaking world. Many of them are believed to have been written by women, but as they were mostly written under anonymous pseudonyms few have been identified. Margareta Momma, Anna Maria Rückerschöld and Catharina Ahlgren belong to the few which has been identified.

Literary women were viewed as fashionable. A male editor stated during a publication of a female poet: "As we wish for nothing higher than to encourage the knowledge among us, it cannot be anything other than pleasant that a member of the gender [women] so admirably support our intention."

In the correspondence-debate in her periodical, Catharina Ahlgren wrote in 1772:

Even though I have just sent my letter, I still write anew until the post leaves. My only consolation Is my feather [feather pen]. Of all artists I praise the inventor of the art of writing the most.

== Works ==
- Au jour de l'illustre naissance de sa majestee notre adourable Reine Le 24 Jullet, poem for the birthday to queen Louisa Ulrika, 1764
- Abrahams bepröfwelse, translation of the Die Prüfung Abrahams by Christoph Martin Wieland, 1772
- Brefwäxling emellan twänne fruntimmer, den ena i Stockholm och den andra på landet i åskillige blandade ämnen, 1-2, periodical, 29 October 1772-February 1773, 24 numbers
- Det olyckliga Fruntimret, eller Elisabeth Windhams bedröfweliga öden, translation, 1772
- La Femme Malhereuse, translation
- Brefväxling emellan Adelaide och någre wittre snillen i omwäxlande ämnen periodical 23 numbers, 1773
- Fortsättning af Adelaides brefwäxling, angående Fru Windhams historie, periodical, 20 numbers, 1773
- De Nymodiga Fruntimren, eller Sophias och Bélisindes Tankespel, 16 numbers, 1773
- Om konsten att rätt behaga, periodical, 1782
- Angenäma Sjelfswåld, periodical, 1783
- Den lyckliga bondflickan, 1-2, translation of C. de Fieux Mouhy, 1796-1811

== Other sources ==
- Bohman, Nils (red.), Svenska män och kvinnor: biografisk uppslagsbok. 2, C-F, Bonnier, Stockholm, 1944
- Stålmarck, Torkel, Hedvig Charlotta Nordenflycht: ett porträtt, Norstedt, Stockholm, 1997
- ”Ett brev betyder så mycket” – några samtida perspektiv på historiska brev
- Anteckningar om svenska qvinnor
- Björkman, Margareta: Catharina Ahlgren : ett skrivande fruntimmer i 1700-talets Sverige (Catharina Ahlgren: a writing woman in 18th-century Sweden) Stockholm Atlantis (2006)
