= Adolf Ulrik Wertmüller =

Swedish painter

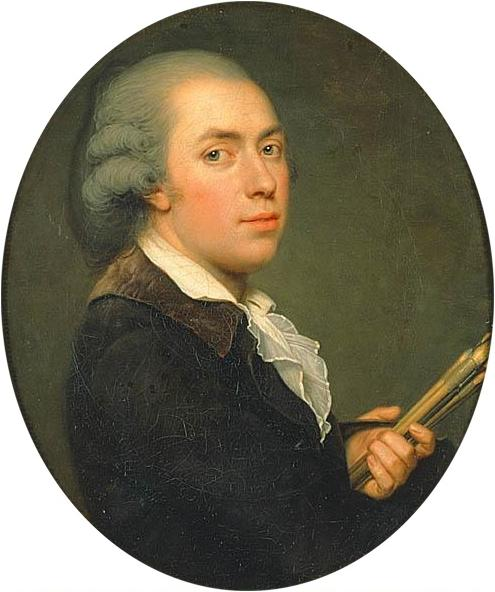
- Self portrait, (ca. 1795-1800)
- Born: February 18, 1751; Stockholm, Sweden
- Died: October 5, 1811 (aged 60); Marcus Hook, Pennsylvania, U.S.
- Education: Royal Swedish Academy of Arts in Stockholm
- Known for: Painting

Adolf Ulrik Wertmüller (February 18, 1751 – October 5, 1811) was a Swedish painter whose notable works include Danaë receiving Jupiter in a Shower of Gold.

Wertmüller was born in Stockholm and studied art at home before moving to Paris in 1772 to study under his cousin Alexander Roslin and French painter Joseph-Marie Vien. On July 30, 1784, Wertmüller was elected to the Royal Academy of Painting and Sculpture.

Wertmüller was commissioned by Gustav III of Sweden for a portrait of Marie Antoinette, which is now in the Nationalmuseum in Stockholm. In 1787, he produced his masterpiece Danaë, a work which proved controversial as one of the earliest female nude paintings exhibited in America.

Wertmüller first emigrated to the United States in May 1794 and continued his portrait work, most notably of General George Washington, but in 1796 was called back to Sweden, eventually returning to Philadelphia in 1800. Elizabeth B. Johnston, in her book Original Portraits of Washington (Boston, 1882), speaks of five portraits of Washington by Wertmüller, of which one, executed in 1797, was purchased by the U. S. government in 1878, and another is owned by the Historical Society of Pennsylvania.

Wertmüller was married to Elizabeth Henderson, granddaughter of noted early American painter Gustavus Hesselius, on January 8, 1801, and two years later retired to a plantation in Claymont, Delaware, where he lived the final years of his life. He died near Marcus Hook, Pennsylvania, aged 60.

== Evaluation ==
His article in Appletons' Cyclopædia of American Biography says (regarding his portraits of Washington): "Though the work of an excellent artist, they are hardly successful as portraits, for Wertmüller belonged to that ideal French school, which usually sacrificed truth to nature for elegance in execution." It later continues: "He was noted especially for his vivid coloring, 'Danae' being a good example of his powers in that respect."

== Gallery ==
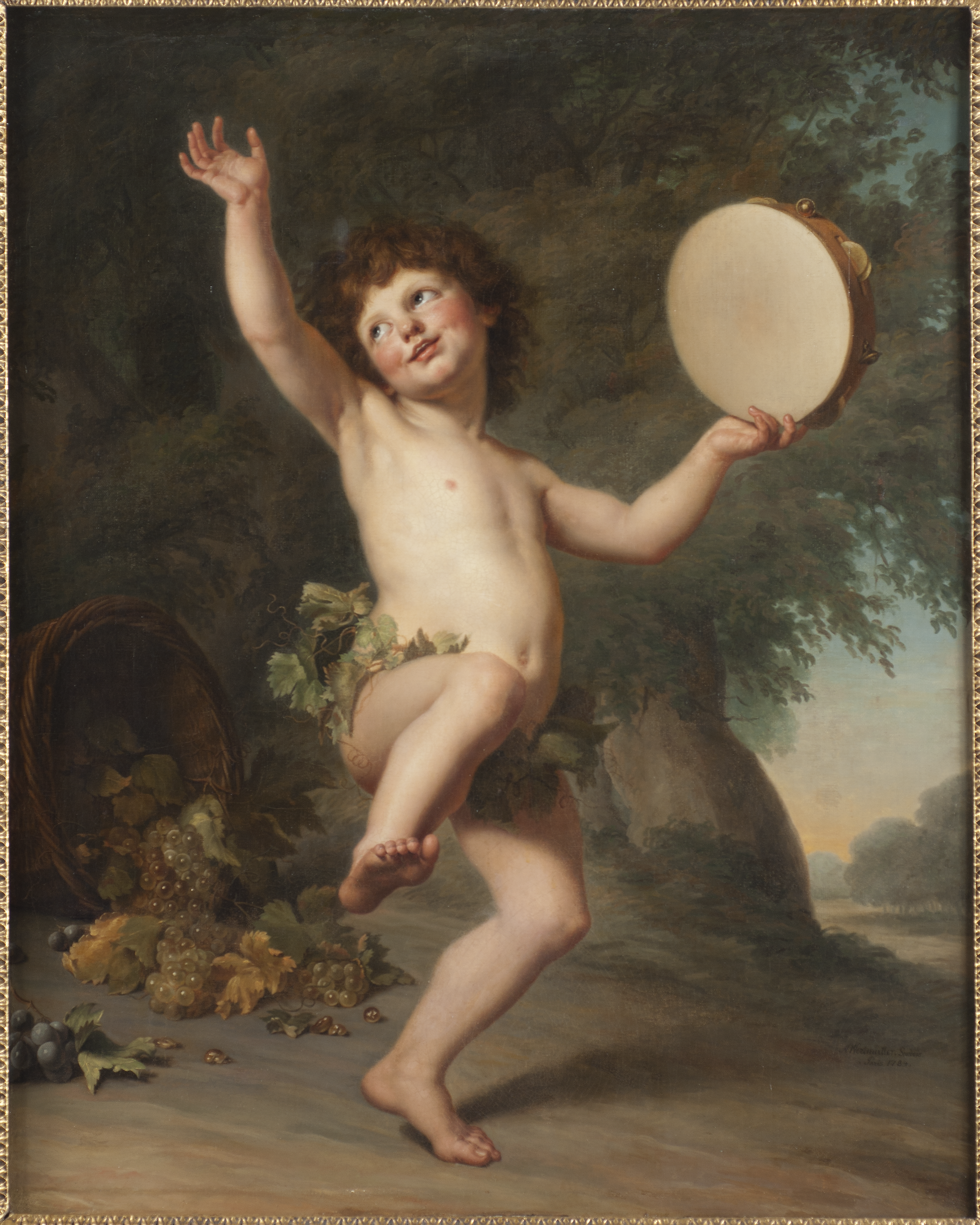
Cupid as Bacchus (1784)

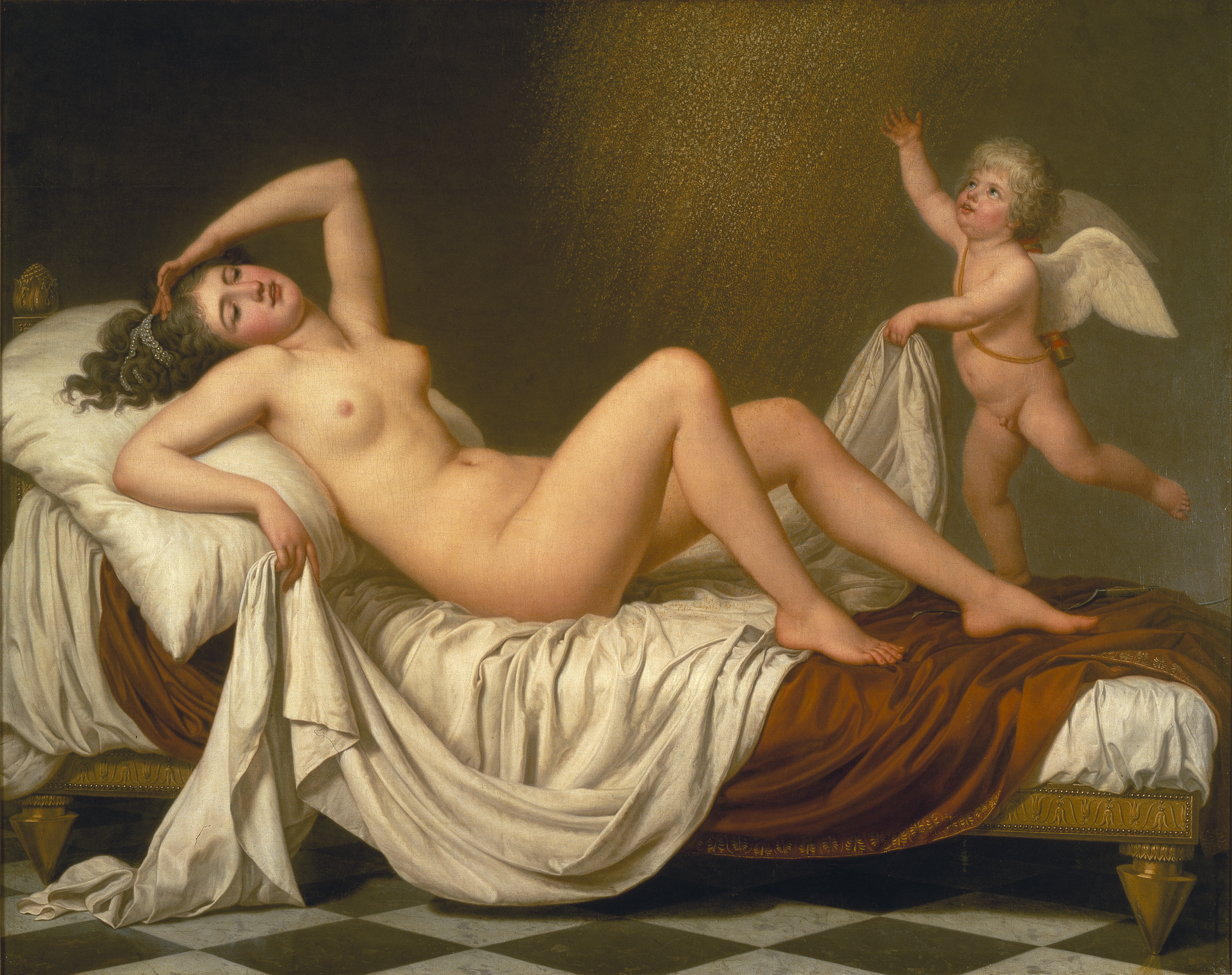
Danaë receiving Jupiter in a Shower of Gold (1787)

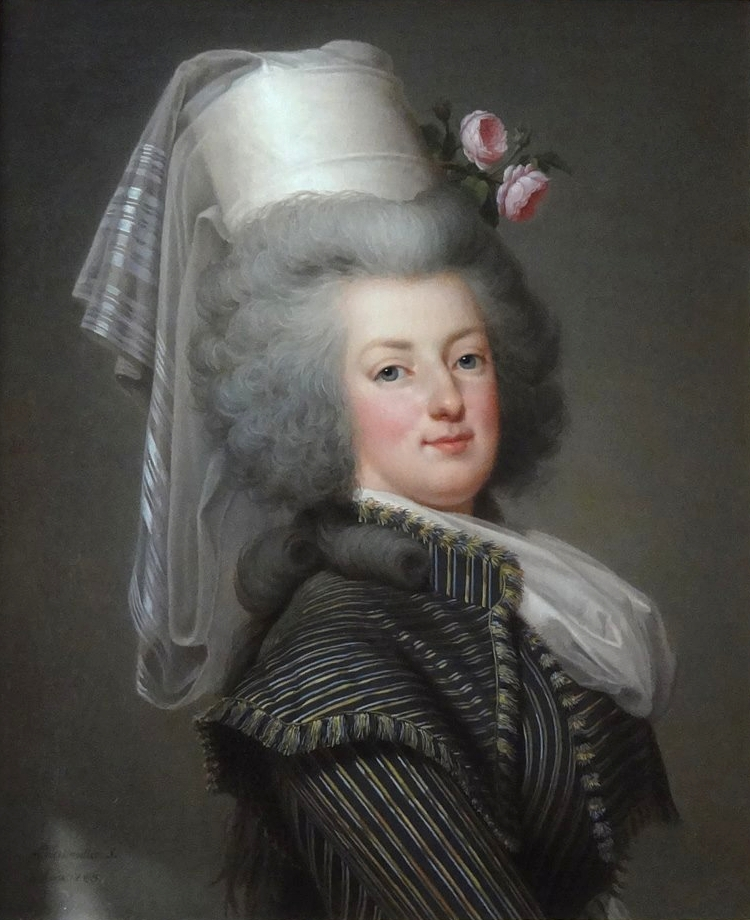
Marie Antoinette in hunting dress (1788)

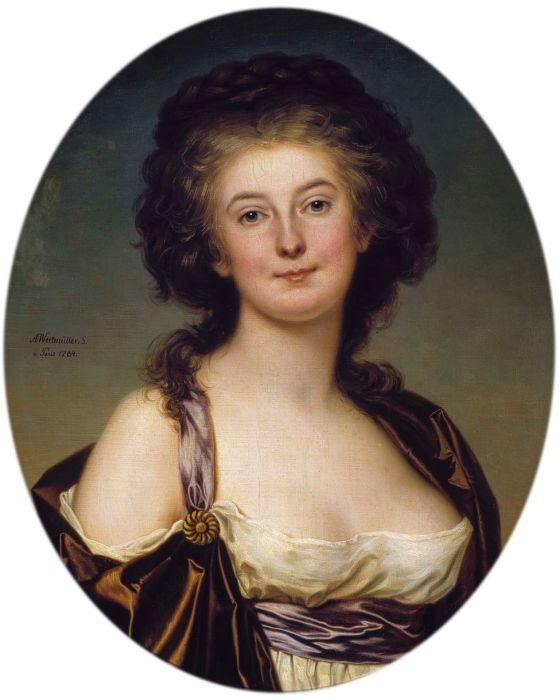
Charlotte Eckerman (1784)

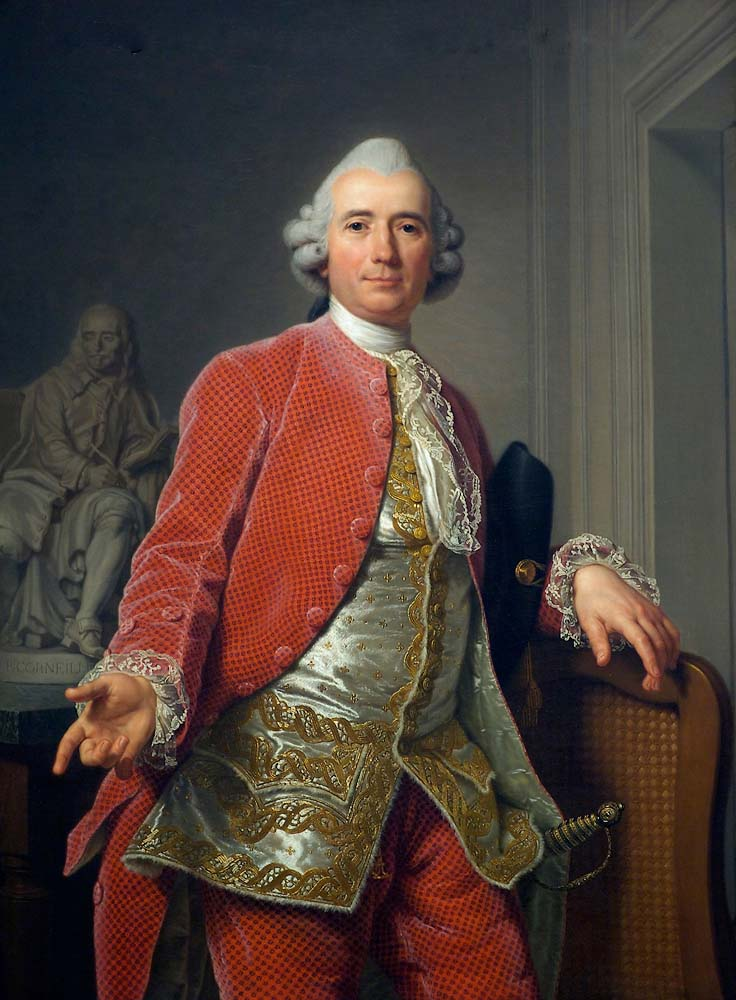
Jean-Jacques Caffieri (1784)

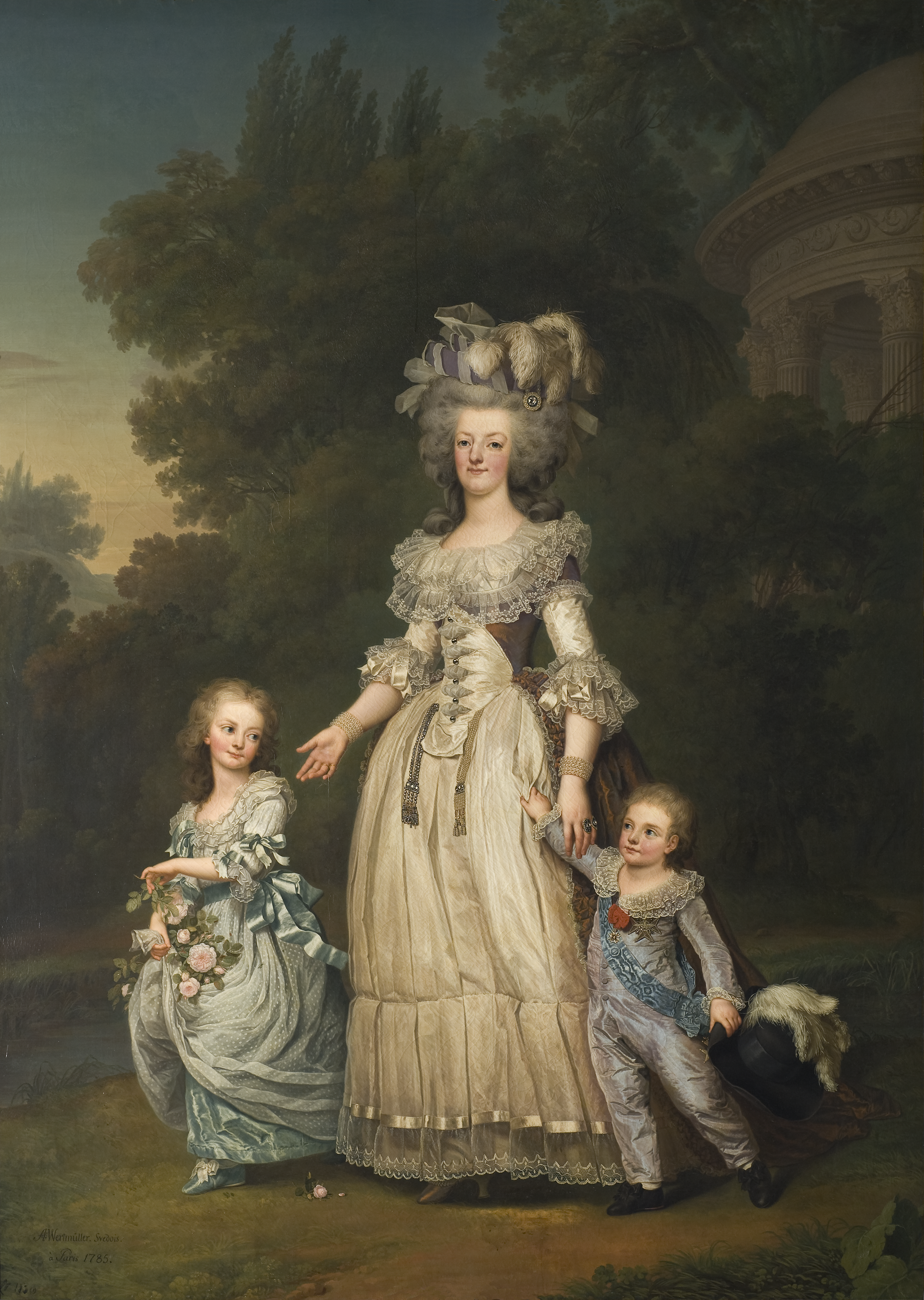
Marie Antoinette with two of her children (1785)

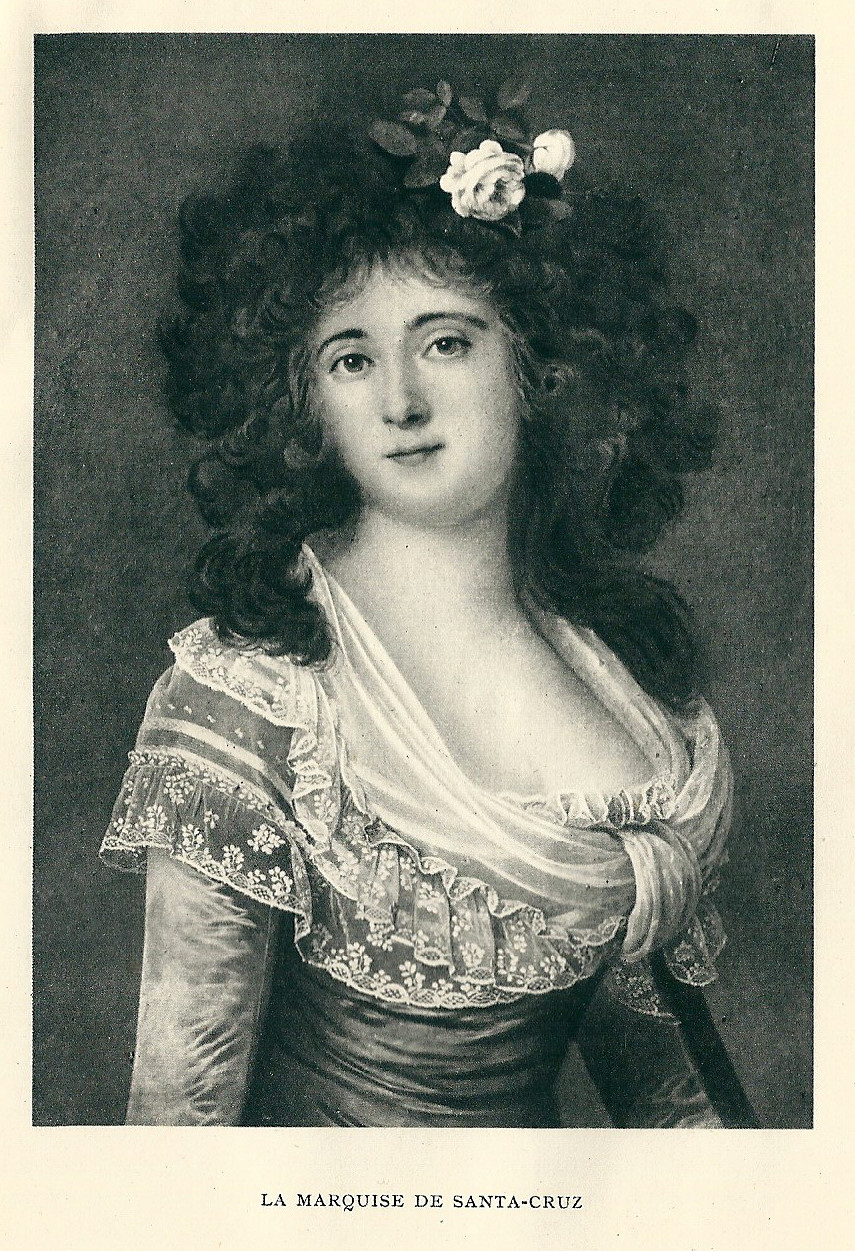
Mariana Waldstein, Marchioness of Santa Cruz
