= Charles XIII =

King of Sweden from 1809 to 1818

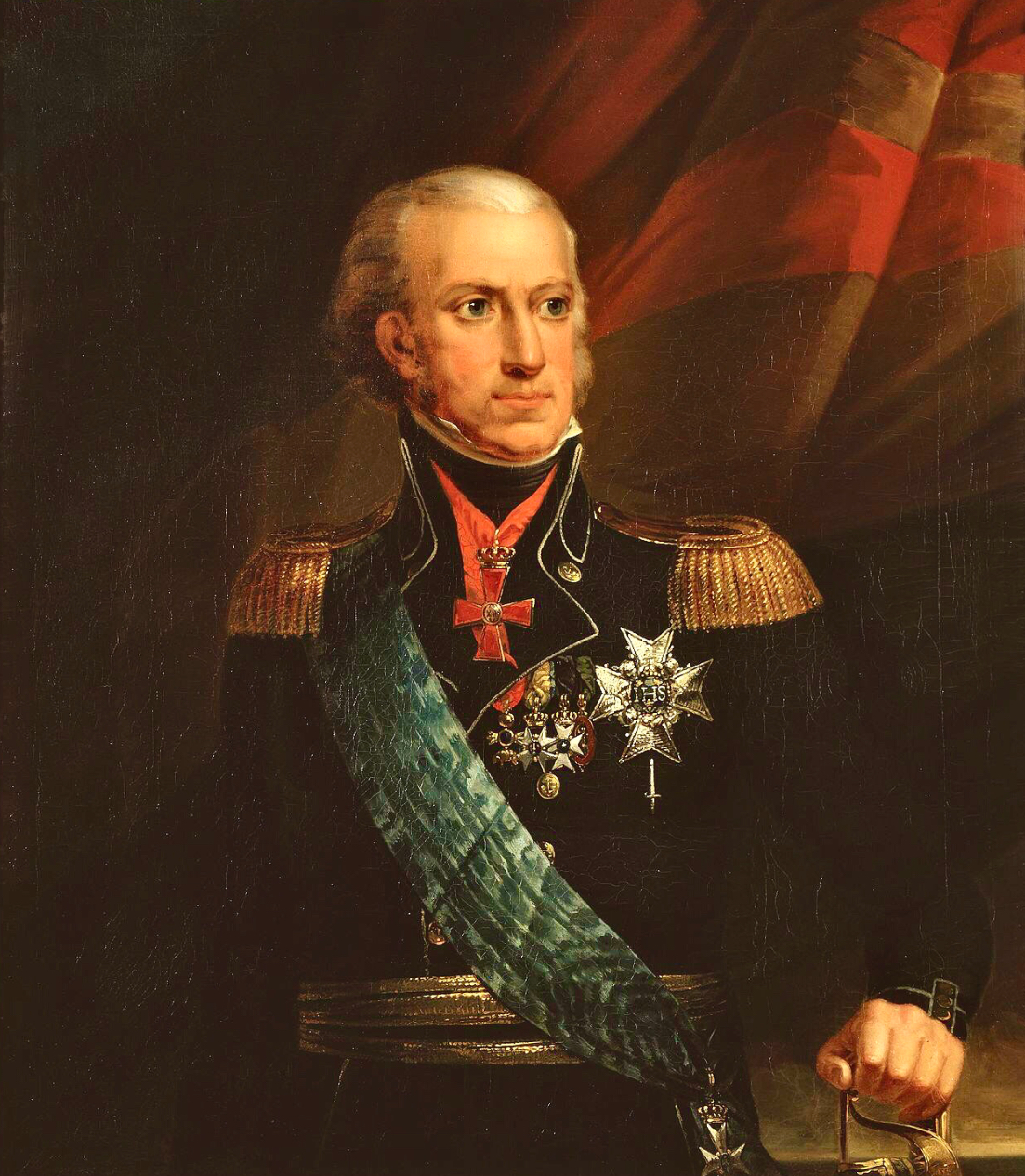
- Charles wearing the insignia of the Order of Charles XIII (in red)

King of Sweden
- Reign: 6 June 1809 – 5 February 1818
- Predecessor: Gustav IV Adolf
- Successor: Charles XIV John

King of Norway
- Reign: 4 November 1814 – 5 February 1818
- Predecessor: Christian Frederick
- Successor: Charles III John

Regent of Sweden
- Tenure: 29 March 1792 – 1 November 1796
- Monarch: Gustav IV Adolf
- Born: 7 October 1748; Stockholm, Sweden
- Died: 5 February 1818 (aged 69); Stockholm, Sweden
- Burial: 20 March 1818; Riddarholm Church
- Spouse: Hedwig Elizabeth Charlotte of Holstein-Gottorp (m. 1774)
- Issue more...: Carl Löwenhielm (ill.)
- House: Holstein-Gottorp
- Father: Adolf Frederick of Sweden
- Mother: Louisa Ulrika of Prussia
- Religion: Lutheran

Charles XIII or Carl XIII (Note: Though known as King Charles XIII in Sweden, he was actually the seventh Swedish king by that name, as Charles IX (reigned 1604–1611) had adopted his numeral after studying a fictitious history of Sweden.) (Swedish: Karl XIII; 7 October 1748 – 5 February 1818) was King of Sweden from 1809 and King of Norway from 1814 to his death in 1818. In Norway, he is known as Charles II. He was the second son (and younger brother to King Gustav III) of King Adolf Frederick of Sweden and Louisa Ulrika of Prussia, sister of Frederick the Great.

== Early life ==
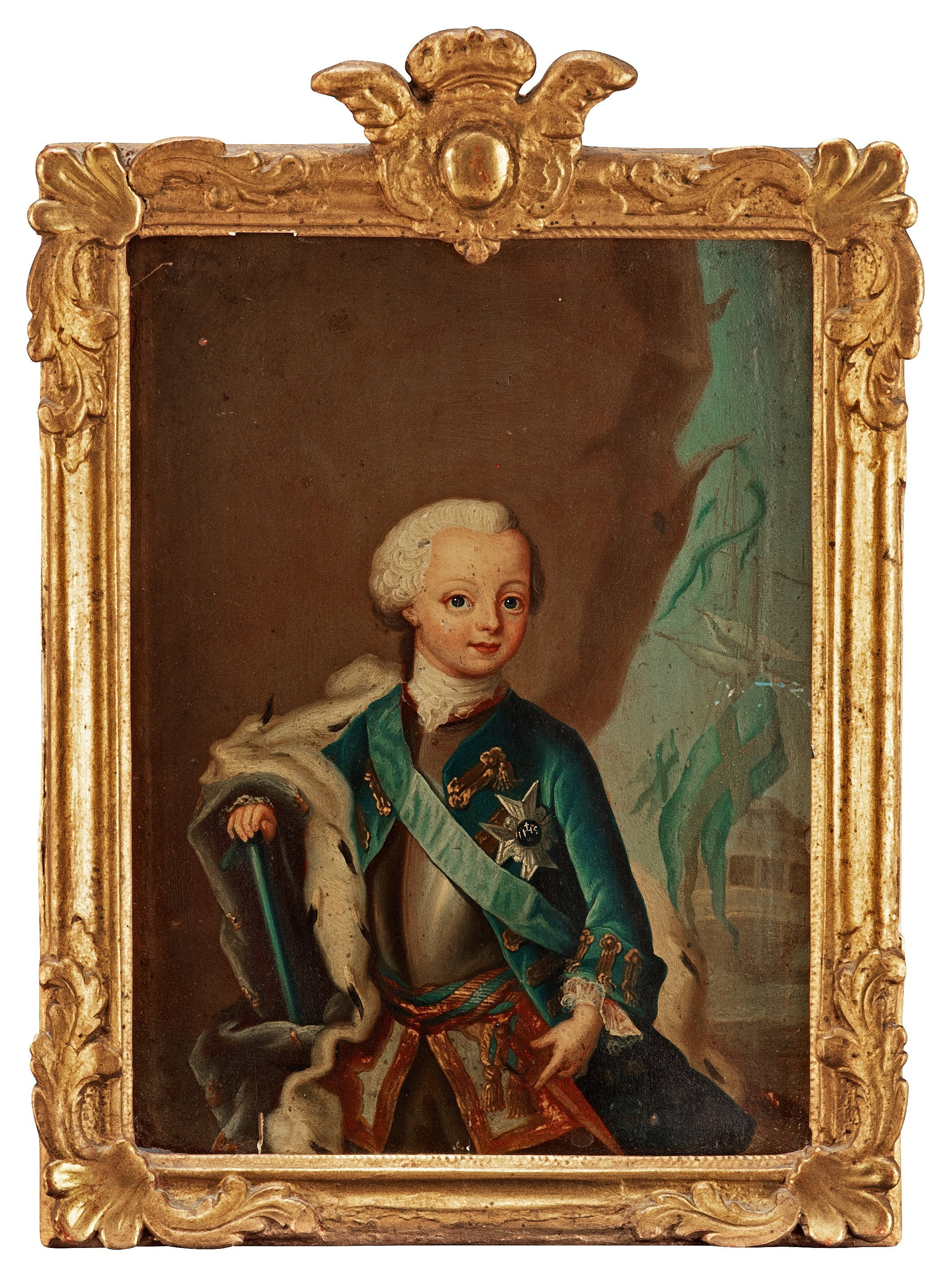
Prince Charles as a boy, in 1758 by Ulrica Pasch.

Prince Charles was placed under the tutelage of Hedvig Elisabet Strömfelt and then Ulrica Schönström. He was appointed grand admiral when he was but few days old. He was described as a good dancer at the amateur theatre of the royal court. Reportedly he was not very close to his mother. The Queen preferred her youngest children, Sophie Albertine and Frederick Adolf.

Charles was, however, his father's favorite, and similar to him in personality. He was also described as close to his brother Gustav during their childhood.

Because of his position as the heir to the throne after his elder brother Gustav, he was early targeted as a useful tool for the opposition to his brother: already in the 1760s, the Caps (party) tried to use him against his brother the crown prince through his then love interest countess Brita Horn, daughter of the Cap's politician Adam Horn. Gustav, however, was always careful to prevent Charles from being used by the opposition, which came to its first test during the December Crisis (1768), when Charles, ultimately, did not let himself be used by the Caps party. In 1770, he made a journey through Germany and France alone.

== Reign of Gustav III ==
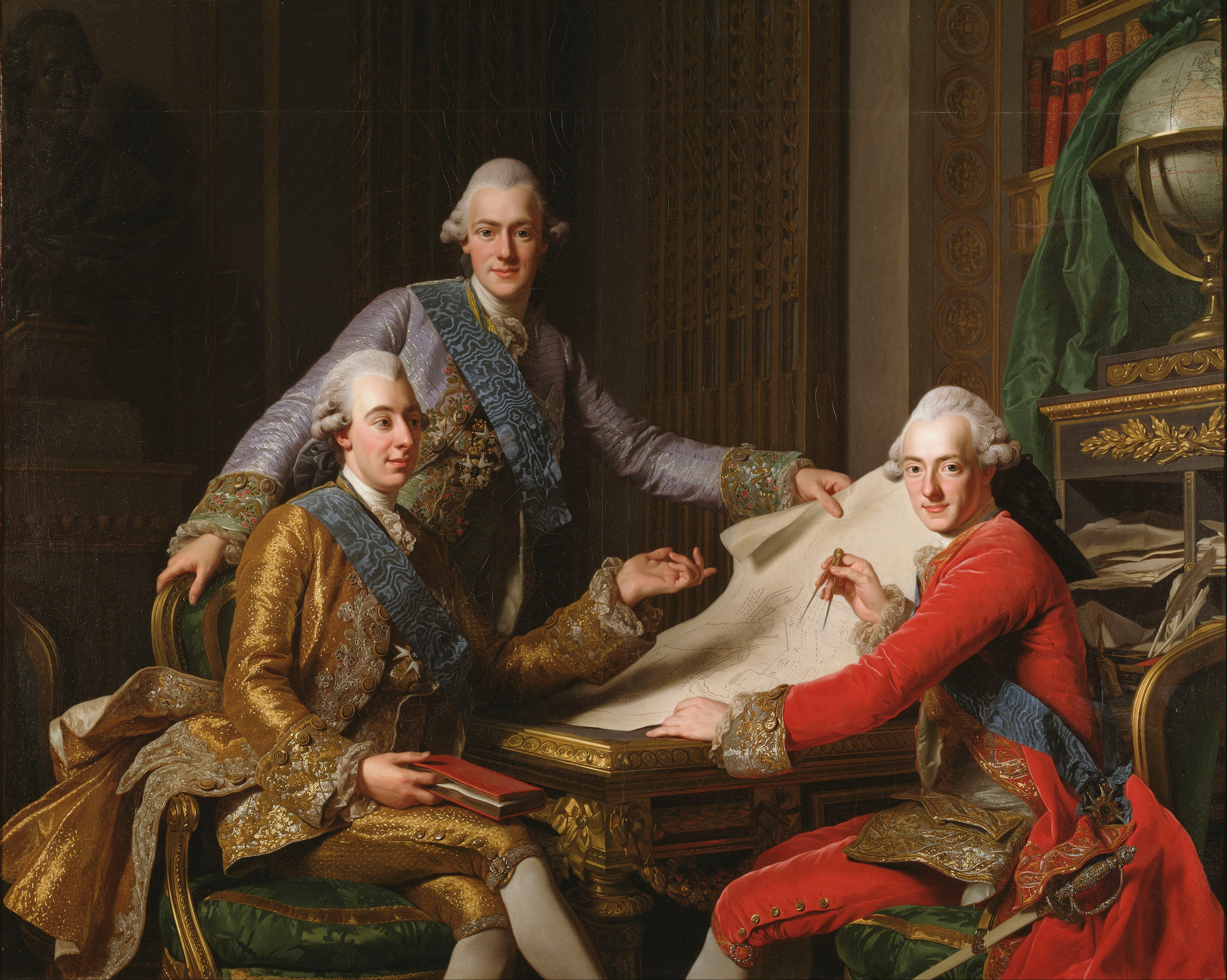
Prince Charles (sitting, right), eldest brother Gustav III, King of Sweden (sitting left), and youngest brother Frederick Adolf, Duke of Östergötland (standing, middle) by Alexander Roslin, 1771.

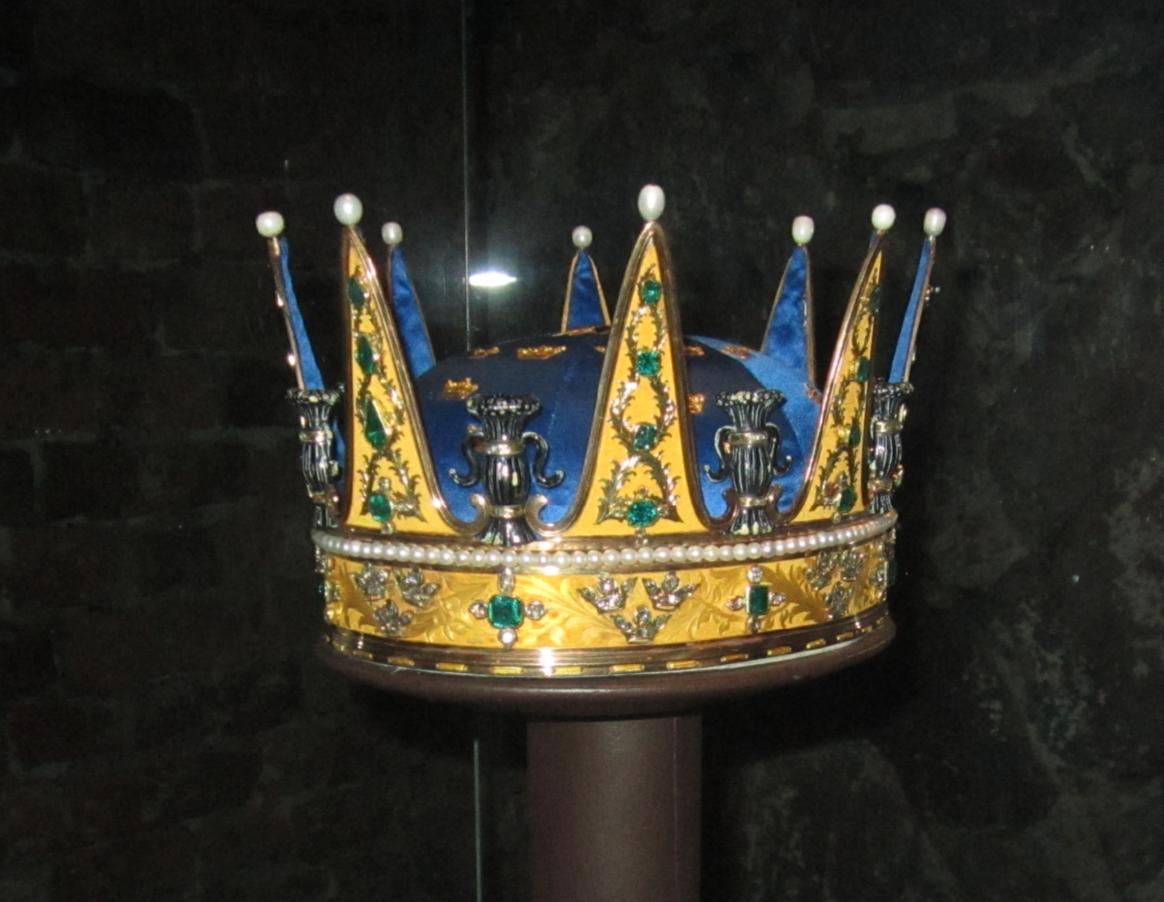
Coronet created for Prince Charles and worn at his brother Gustav's coronation in 1772.

After the death of his father in 1771, when his brother the crown prince was abroad, the Caps once again attempted to use him against his brother, now King Gustav III of Sweden, and his mother Louisa Ulrika used this in order to have her own rights as a dowager queen respected by the Caps. Upon the departure of his mother to Prussia, and the return of his brother, however, Gustav III managed to win him to his side.

In 1772 he cooperated in the Revolution of 1772 of his elder brother, King Gustav. He was given the task of using his connections in the Caps party to neutralize it and secure the southern provinces by use of the military, tasks he performed successfully and for which the king rewarded him with the title Duke of Södermanland.

Duke Charles in early years was the object of his mother's plans to arrange political marriages for her children. On the wish of his mother, he was to be married to her niece, his cousin Philippine of Brandenburg-Schwedt, a plan to which he had agreed in 1770. The government, however, refused to issue negotiations because of the costs.

After the accession of Gustav III and the coup d'état which introduced absolute monarchy, his brother terminated these plans against their mother's will in October 1772, and began negotiations for a marriage between Charles and his 13-year-old cousin, Princess Hedwig Elizabeth Charlotte of Holstein-Gottorp. As King Gustav had not consummated his own marriage, he wished to place the task of providing an heir to the throne with his brother. Charles agreed to the marriage in August 1773, and the marriage took place the following year. After a false alarm of a pregnancy of Duchess Hedvig Elisabeth Charlotte in 1775, the king finally consummated his own marriage. Charles and his wife lived separate private lives and each had extramarital affairs.

During the great succession scandal of 1778, when queen dowager Louisa Ulrika questioned the paternity of the issue of Gustav III, Charles sided with his brother the king against their mother, this despite the fact that it was in fact he who had informed her of the rumors regarding the legitimacy, something he however withheld from the king.

Charles was described as dependent and easily influenced. His numerous affairs gave him the reputation of being a libertine. He was reputed for his many lovers, of which the more well known were Augusta von Fersen, Charlotte Eckerman, Françoise-Éléonore Villain, Mariana Koskull and Charlotte Slottsberg, the last one reputed to have had political influence over him. He unsuccessfully courted Countess Magdalena Rudenschöld, and her refusal of his advances has been pointed out as the cause of the harsh treatment he exposed her to as regent during the Armfelt conspiracy. After the late 1790s, when his health deteriorated as a result of a series of rheumatic attacks, his relationship to his consort improved and she gained more influence over him.

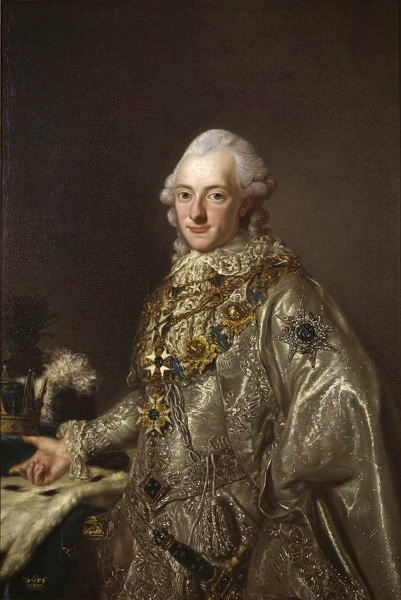
Prince Charles in his princely attire for his brother Gustav III's coronation in 1772. His coronet can be seen on the left.

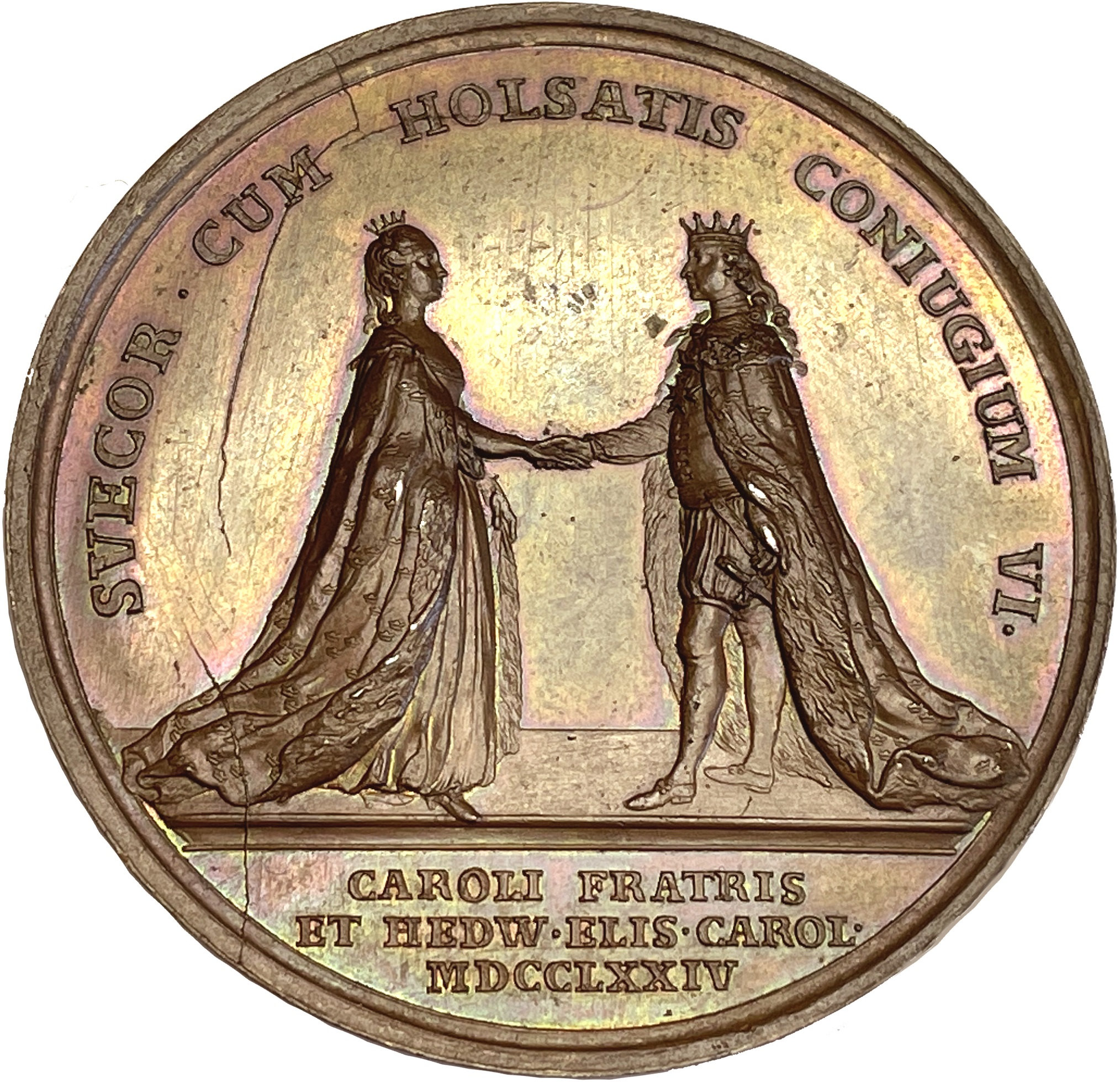
Medal issued when Charles married his cousin Hedwig Elizabeth Charlotte of Holstein-Gottorp in 1774.

The Duke was known for his interest in the supernatural and mysticism, and he was engaged in several secret societies. He was a member of the Freemasons. He was reportedly a client of the fortune teller Ulrica Arfvidsson, and he also favored the medium Henrik Gustaf Ulfvenklou. In 1811, he founded the Order of Charles XIII, a Swedish order of chivalry awarded only to a maximum number of 33 knights, on the condition of confessing the Lutheran Evangelic Religion and being Freemasons. All Princes and Kings of the Bernadotte dynasty, the royal house of Sweden are from baptism, incorporate parts of the royal order of knights and freemasons. In addition are the order of merit granted to members of foreign Grand Lodges affiliated to the so-called Swedish System, such as the Grande Loge Nationale Française, if of royal rank. When the Swedish order of Freemason's states that "Freemasonry in Sweden has continued to develop under leadership of their Grand Masters, all of them belonging to the Royal House since more than 200 years", the origin of which arrives in large from King Charles II of Norway, XIII of Sweden.

Duke Charles was given several political tasks during his tenure as a duke. In 1777, he served as regent during Gustav III's stay in Russia. In 1780, he served as formal chief commander during the king's stay in Spa. The same year, Gustav III named him regent for his son should he succeed him while still a minor. However, he was not appointed regent during the journey of the king to Italy and France in 1783–84, and in the following years, he came under the influence of Gustaf Adolf Reuterholm, who was in opposition to the monarch, and came to be less trusted by Gustav III.

In 1785, he was offered the Dukedom of Courland by the nobility of the Duchy and given the support of Gustav III. This however never materialized.

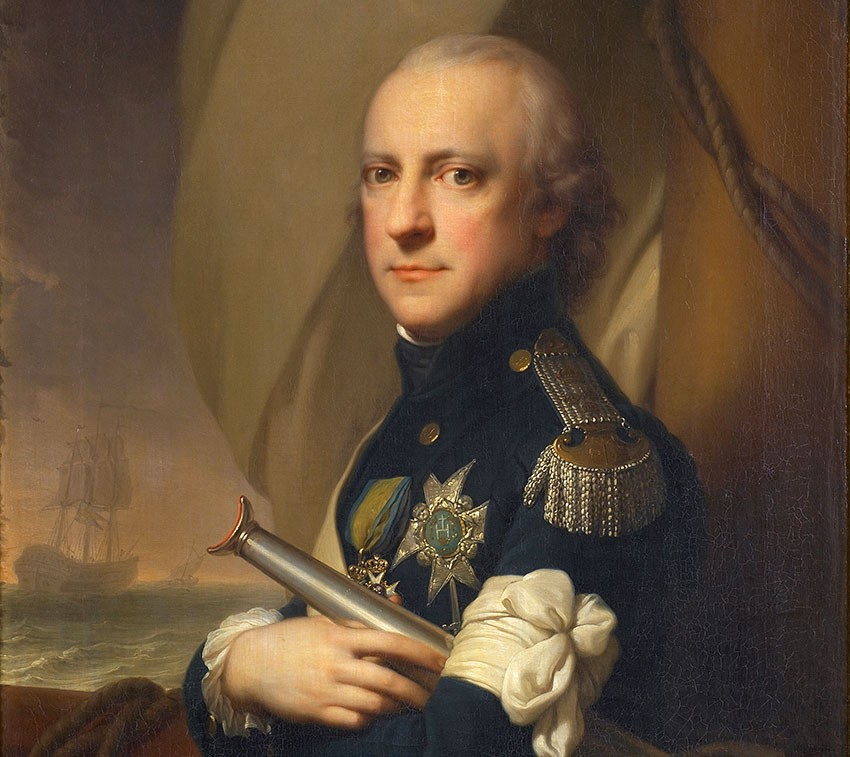
Duke Charles as admiral of the Swedish fleet, by Giovanni Battista Lampi the Elder, 1799.

On the outbreak of the Russo-Swedish War of 1788 he served with distinction as admiral of the fleet, especially at the battles of Hogland (7 June 1788) and Öland (26 July 1789). On the latter occasion he would have won a signal victory but for the remissness of his second-in-command, Admiral Liljehorn.

The autumn of 1789, Duchess Hedvig Elisabeth Charlotte wished to depose Gustav III and place her husband Duke Charles upon the throne. Her ideal was the Swedish Constitution of 1772, which she saw as a good tool for an enlightened aristocracy, and the war and the Union and Security Act had made her a leading part of the opposition. She cooperated with Prince Frederick Adolf of Sweden and Gustaf Adolf Reuterholm. The plan was to force Charles to act as a symbol of the opposition to the Union and Security Act when the time was right. When the time arrived to make Charles act, however, he refused, which effectively foiled the coup.

Charles was in close connection to the opposition against Gustav III, and it is debated whether he knew of and supported the plans to assassinate the king.

== Reign of Gustav IV Adolf ==
On the assassination of Gustav III in 1792, Charles acted as regent of Sweden until 1796 on behalf of his nephew, King Gustav IV, who was a minor when his father was shot in the Stockholm opera. Gustav III had designated him regent in his earlier will. When he was dying, he altered the will, and while still appointing Charles regent of his minor son, he was no longer to rule absolute, but restricted by a government consisted of the supporters of Gustav III. After the death of the monarch, however, Charles successfully contested the will and was given unlimited power as sole regent.

The Duke-regent was in practice not willing or capable to manage the state affairs, reportedly because of his lack of energy and staying power. Instead, he entrusted the power of government to his favorite and adviser Gustaf Adolf Reuterholm, whose influence over him was supreme. These four years have been considered perhaps the most miserable and degrading period in Swedish history; an Age of Lead succeeding an Age of Gold, as it has been called, and may be briefly described as alternations of fantastic jacobinism and the ruthless despotism. Reuterholm ruled as the uncontested regent de facto the entire tenure of the regency, "only seldom disturbed by other influences or any personal will of Charles". The unexpectedly mild sentences of the involved in the regicide of Gustav III attracted attention. In 1794 the discovery of the Armfelt Conspiracy exposed the opposition of the Gustavian Party. The marriage negotiations of the young king disturbed the relationship to Russia, and the alliance with revolutionary France was greatly disliked by other powers.

On the coming of age of Gustav IV Adolf of Sweden in November 1796, the duke's regency ended. His relationship to Gustav IV Adolf was cordial though never close, and he was not entrusted with much responsibility during the rule of his nephew. In 1797 and 1798, he and his consort had their first children, though in neither case the child lived. After this, the Duke and Duchess made a journey through Germany and Austria in 1798–99.

In 1803, the Boheman affair caused a severe conflict between Gustav IV Adolf and the ducal couple. The mystic Karl Adolf Boheman (1764–1831) had been introduced to the couple by Count Magnus Stenbock in 1793 and gained great influence by promising to reveal scientific secrets about the occult. Boheman inducted them into a secret society Yellow Rose in 1801, where both sexes were accepted as members, and to which the Counts and Countesses Ruuth and Brahe as well as the mother of the queen were introduced. Boheman was arrested upon an attempt to recruit the monarch, who accused him of revolutionary agendas and expelled him. The ducal couple were exposed in an informal investigation by the monarch, and the duchess was questioned in the presence of the royal council. In 1808, Charles was again chief commander during Gustav IV Adolf's stay in Finland. He is presumed to have been, if not involved, aware of the plans to depose Gustav IV Adolf in 1809. He kept passive during the Coup of 1809, and accepted the post of regent from the victorious party after having assured himself that the deposed monarch was not in mortal danger. Charles was initially not willing to accept the crown, however, out of consideration for the former king's son.

== Reign ==
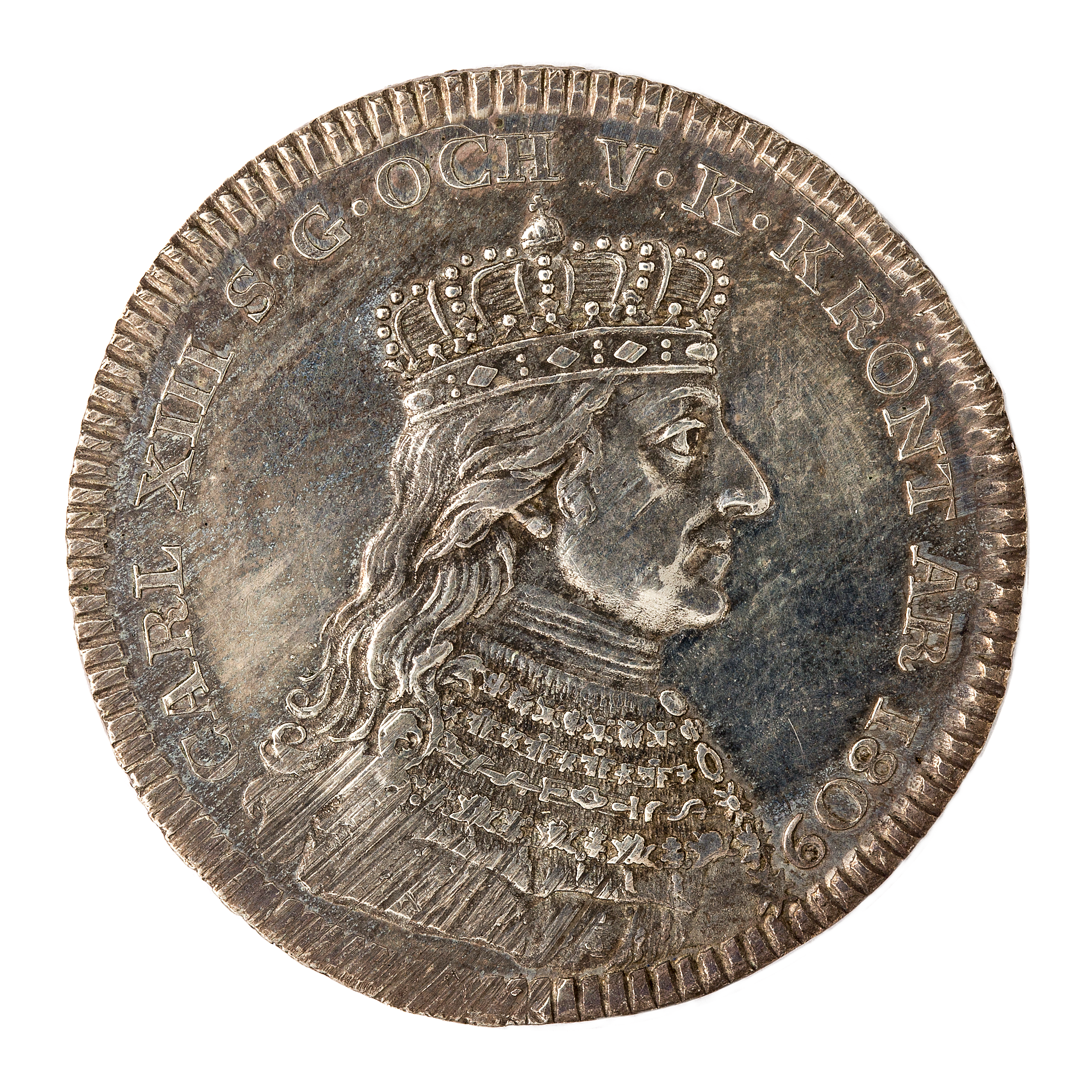
King Charles XIII's coronation coin 1809.

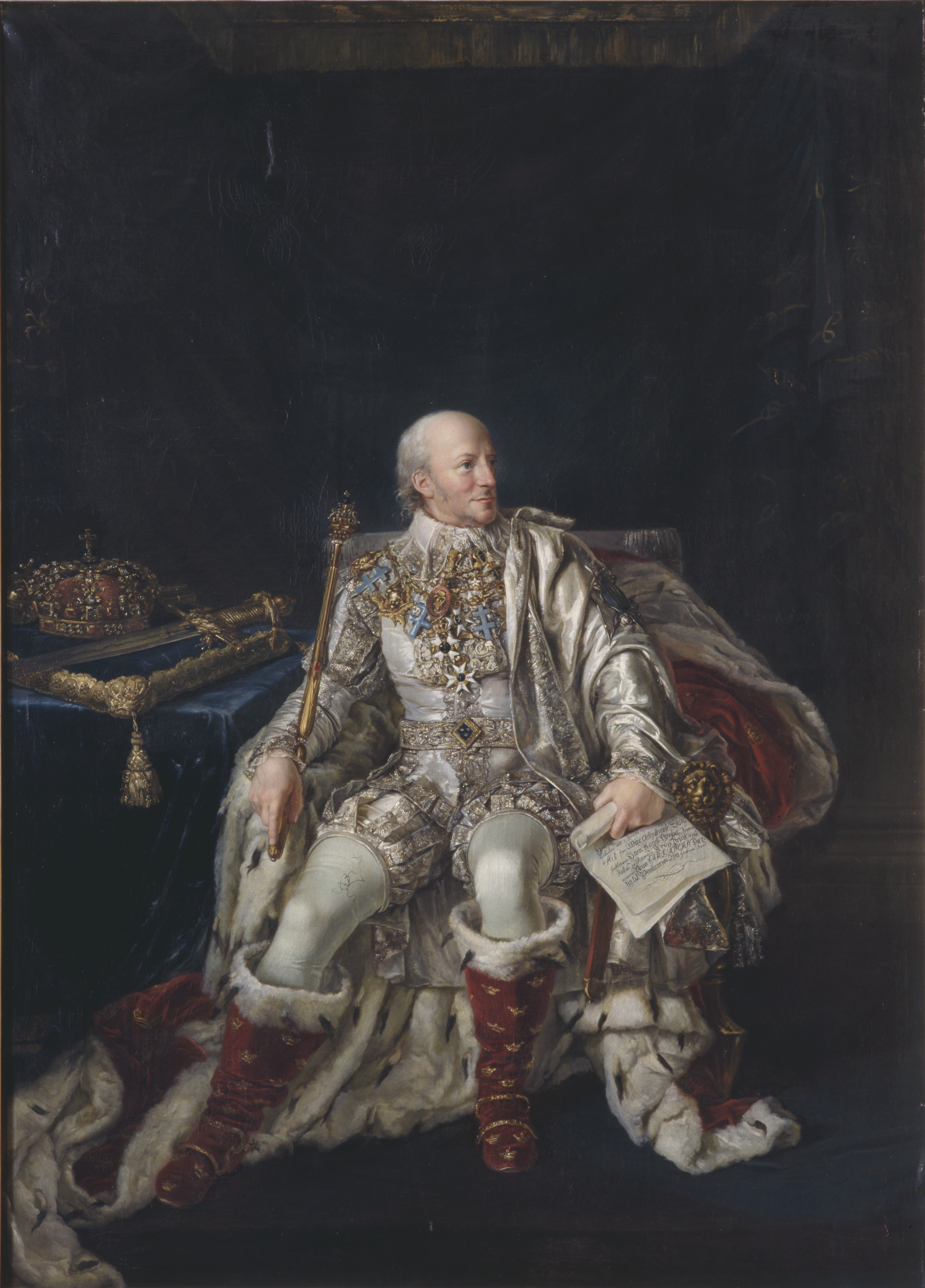
The elderly King Charles XIII, by Pehr Krafft the Younger, 1813. The King is dressed in Swedish royal attire with the royal purple mantle over his shoulder and is holding the adoption certificate for Prince Charles John.

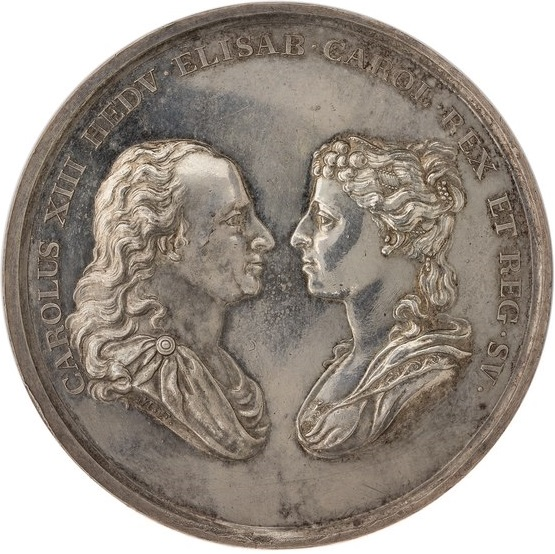
Coronation medal for king Charles XIII and queen Charlotte in 1809.

On 13 March 1809, those who had dethroned Gustav IV Adolf appointed Charles regent, and he was finally elected king by the Riksdag of the Estates. By the time he became king, he was 60 years old and prematurely decrepit. In November 1809, he was affected by a heart attack, and was not able to participate in government. The new constitution which was introduced also made his involvement in politics difficult. A planned attempt to enlarge the royal power in 1809–10 was not put into effect because of his indecisiveness and health condition.

His incapacity triggered a search for a suitable heir. The initial choice was a Danish prince, Christian August, who took the name Charles August upon being adopted by Charles. However, the unmarried 41-year-old Charles August died only a few months after his arrival in Sweden. One of Napoleon's marshals, Jean-Baptiste Bernadotte, was then chosen as his successor. The new crown prince took over the government as soon as he landed in Sweden in 1810. Charles's condition deteriorated every year, especially after 1812 suffering a stroke, and he eventually became but a mute witness during the government councils chaired by the crown prince, having lost his memory and no longer being able to communicate.

Silver medal, 1818. Reverse, Charles XIII and Charles XIV John.

By the Union of Sweden and Norway on 4 November 1814, Charles became king of Norway under the name Carl II of Norway. After eight years as king only by title, Charles died without a natural heir on 5 February 1818, and Bernadotte succeeded him as King Charles XIV John.

Charles was the 872nd Knight of the Order of the Golden Fleece in Spain.

== Family ==
He married his 15-year-old cousin, Princess Hedwig Elizabeth Charlotte of Holstein-Gottorp (1759–1818), on 7 July 1774 in Stockholm. They had two children who died in infancy:

1. Stillborn daughter (2 July 1797)
2. Carl Adolf, Duke of Värmland (Stockholm, 4 July 1798 – Stockholm, 10 July 1798). Lived six days; buried at Riddarholm Church.

With Augusta von Fersen, he had an extramarital son:

1. Carl Axel Löwenhielm (1772–1861)

Adopted sons:

1. Charles August, Crown Prince of Sweden
2. Charles XIV John of Sweden

== Honours and arms ==
=== Honours ===
- Sweden:
  - Knight of the Order of the Seraphim, 7 October 1748
  - Commander Grand Cross of the Order of the Sword, 7 October 1748; Grand Cross, 1st Class, 27 July 1788
  - Commander Grand Cross of the Order of the Polar Star, 7 October 1748
  - Commander Grand Cross of the Order of Vasa, 7 October 1748
  - Founder of the Order of Charles XIII, 27 May 1811
- Kingdom of Prussia: Knight of the Order of the Black Eagle, 18 October 1770
- Russian Empire:
  - Knight of the Order of St. Andrew, 28 August 1796
  - Knight of the Order of St. Alexander Nevsky, 28 August 1796
- Denmark: Knight of the Order of the Elephant, 10 February 1810
- Spain: Knight of the Order of the Golden Fleece, 23 September 1814

=== Arms ===
Coat of Arms as
Prince of Sweden,
Duke of Södermanland

Coat of Arms as
King Charles XIII
of Sweden, 1809–1814

Coat of Arms as King Charles XIII of Sweden and Charles II of Norway, 1814–1818

Royal Monogram of
King Charles XIII of Sweden

== Ancestors ==
Ancestors of Charles XIII

8. Christian Albert, Duke of Holstein-Gottorp
4. Christian August of Holstein-Gottorp, Prince of Eutin
9. Frederikke Amalie of Denmark
2. Adolf Frederick of Sweden
10. Frederick VII, Margrave of Baden-Durlach
5. Albertina Frederica of Baden-Durlach
11. Augusta Marie of Holstein-Gottorp
1. Charles XIII of Sweden
12. Frederick I of Prussia
6. Frederick William I of Prussia
13. Sophia Charlotte of Hanover
3. Louisa Ulrika of Prussia
14. George I of Great Britain
7. Sophia Dorothea of Hanover
15. Sophia Dorothea of Celle

== See also ==
- Gustavian era
- List of Freemasons

== Notes ==
Charles XIII/II House of Holstein-Gottorp Cadet branch of the House of Oldenburg Born: 7 October 1748 Died: 5 February 1818
Regnal titles
Preceded by Gustav IV Adolf	King of Sweden; 1809–1818	Succeeded by Charles XIV/III John
Preceded by Christian Frederick	King of Norway; 1814–1818	Succeeded by Charles XIV/III John
