= Långholmens spinnhus =

Former women's prison in Långholmen, Stockholm, Sweden

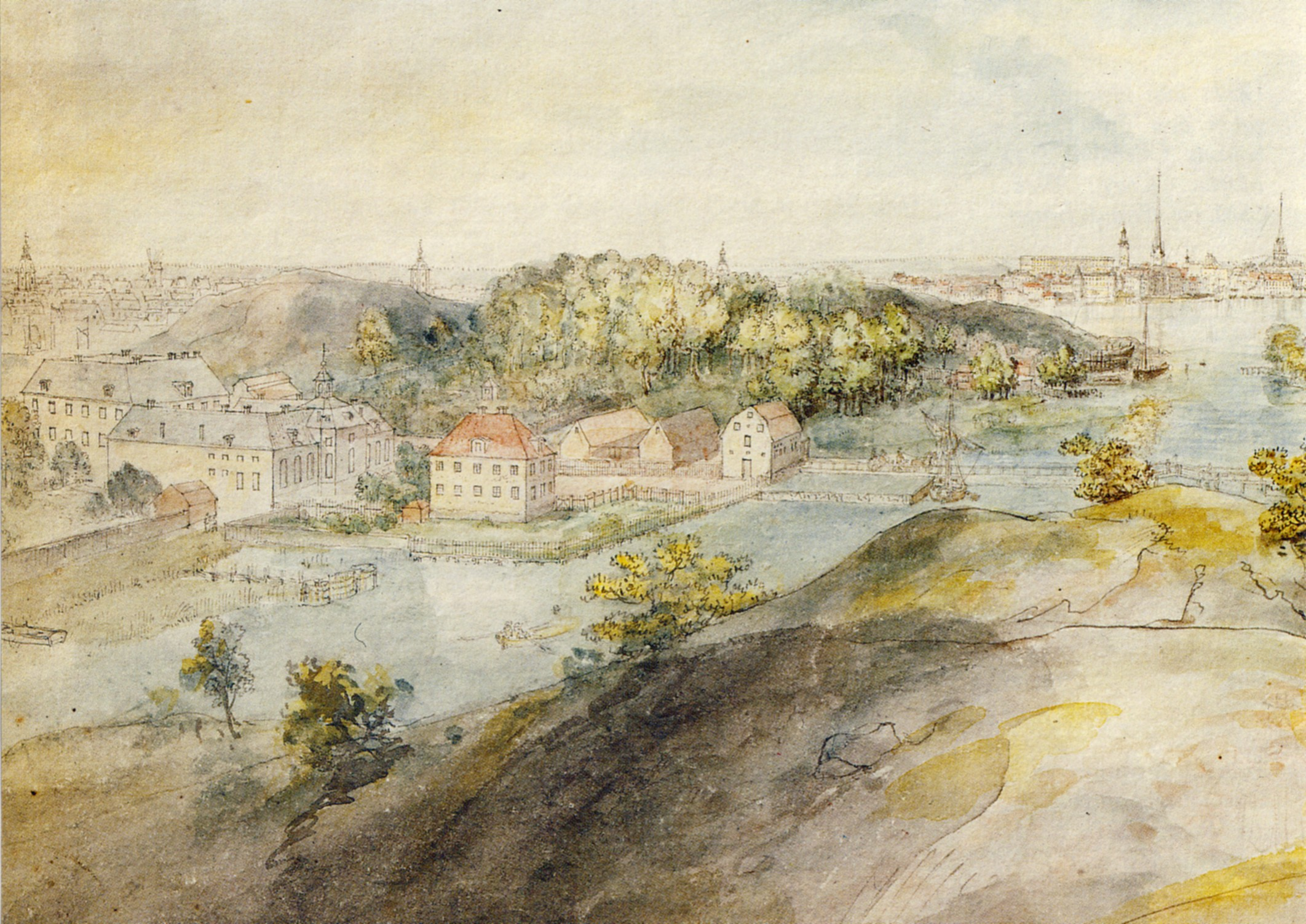
Långholmens spinnhus in an illustration by Elias Martin from 1787

Långholmens rasp- och spinnhus, commonly known as Långholmens spinnhus, was a women's prison in Långholmen, Stockholm, Sweden. The prison was established in 1649 when the Malmgården in Alstavik at Långholmen was erected, and was closed in 1825. The building became state property in 1724 and was used as a spinnhus (thread-spinning house). Malmgården was later expanded to increase its capacity. In 1825 the spinnhus was relocated to Norrmalm. After the move, the Långholmen Prison started to operate on the grounds.

The Långholmen Prison was modelled after the rasp and spinnhus in the Netherlands. It was created mainly as a means of controlling the numbers of beggars, the homeless and the unemployed. From 1723 onward, any unmarried homeless woman who did not have an employer, a legal profession or personal property, were labelled as defenseless, a status which was considered criminal at the time, and were subsequently sent to this prison. The incarcerated women were divided into different groups depending on their ages and abilities. Amongst the better known prisoners were the Gråkoltarna, religious dissenters who were imprisoned in 1733. The institution included training programmes for women prisoners which included occupational training with an emphasis on sewing. In 1746, the premises of the spinnhus were expanded to their present form.

== Early years ==
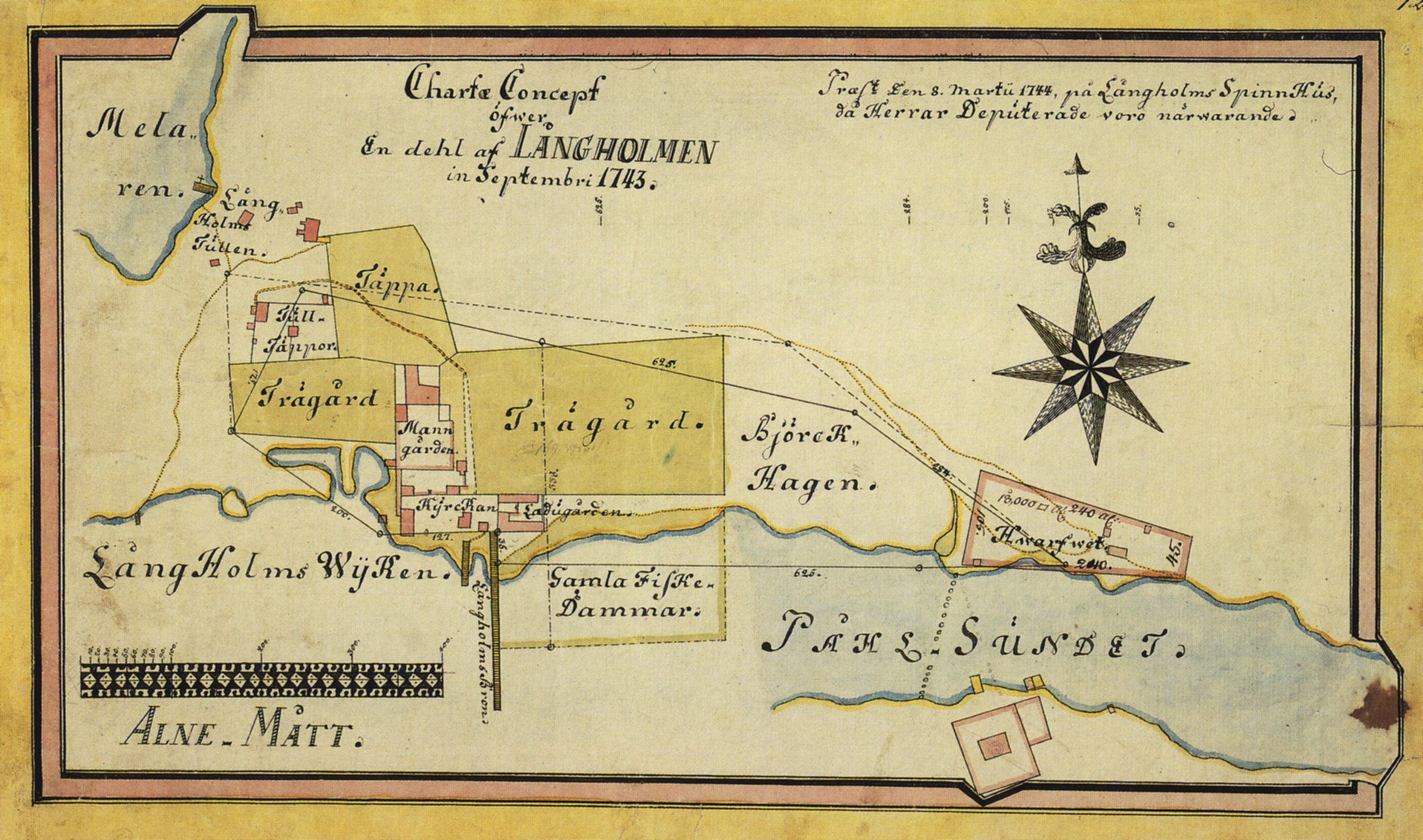
Spinnhuset in a map from 1743

In 1698, the King of Sweden initiated the process of establishing a spinnhus in Stockholm. Once built, products from the jail were to be sold to wool factories and also used to fill the clothing needs of the defence forces. It was initially proposed that the spinnhus should be built at Rörstrand, Stockholm. However, due to lack of state funding, the builders accepted an offer to use Johan Spalding's estate at Alstavik, Långholmen instead.

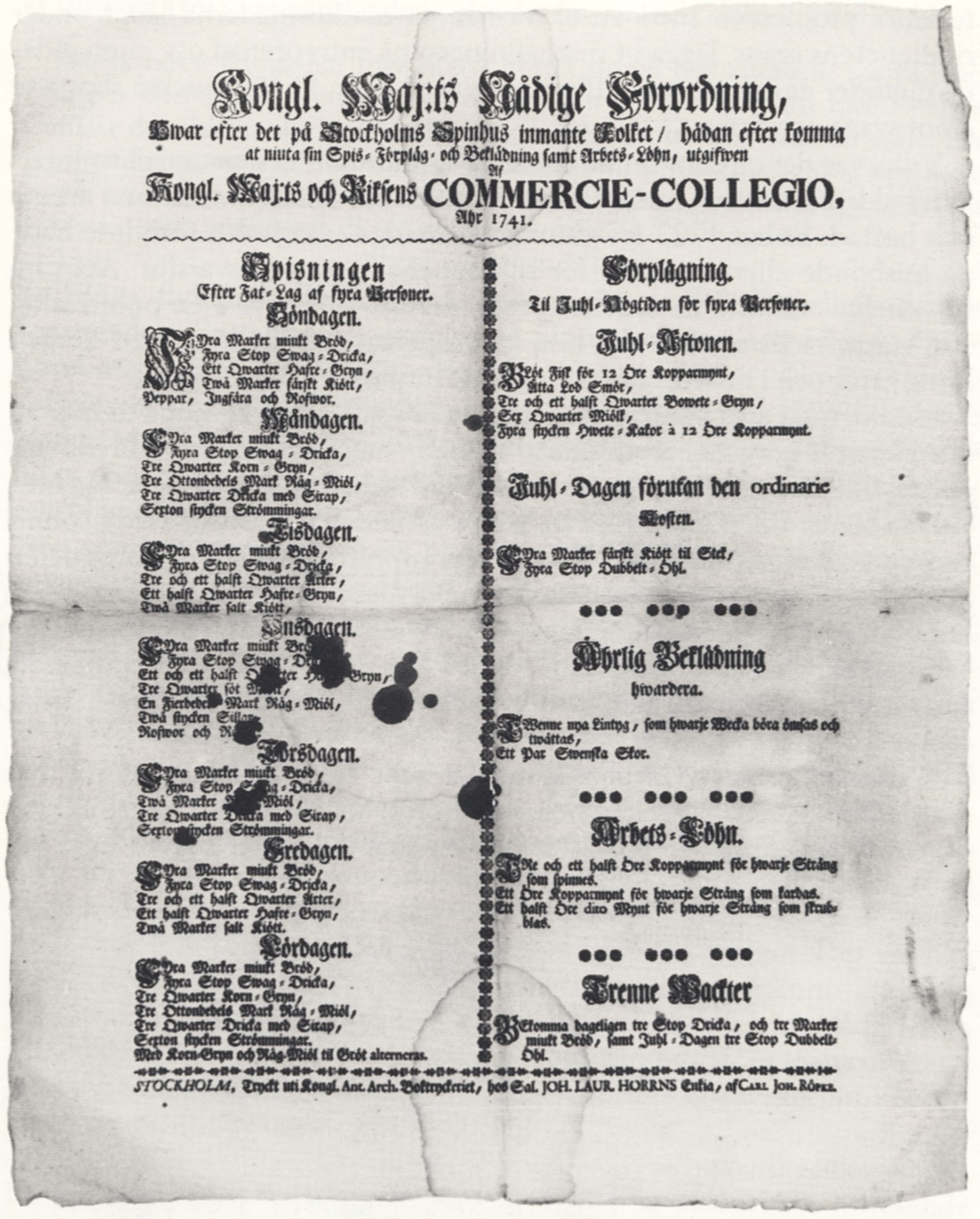
Food, clothing and pay at the spinnhus circa 1741

The property was bought in 1724 by a business college for 37,000 daler. The institution was officially named "Långholmens spinnhus". The women taken to the spinnhus were primarily from the ranks of the homeless, the beggars, and the unemployed.

The imprisoned women were awakened as early as four a.m. to start work at five, and would work until seven or at times nine p.m. They were divided into various groups depending on their age and ability. The elderly and sick who were unable to work processing wool were given the task of spinning linen instead.

The inmates of the spinnhus were considered at the time to be learning a profession through the work they performed during their imprisonment, enabling them to earn a living when they left, which would prevent them from returning to living "indecently", by, for example, going back to prostitution. Nowadays, this view is regarded as justifying the imprisonment of homeless women at the spinnhus. An examination of the records kept in the jail archives reveals that it was not unusual for women to return to prostitution once they were out of jail, and subsequently to be imprisoned again. Many returned to the prison several times.

== Expansions in 1746 ==
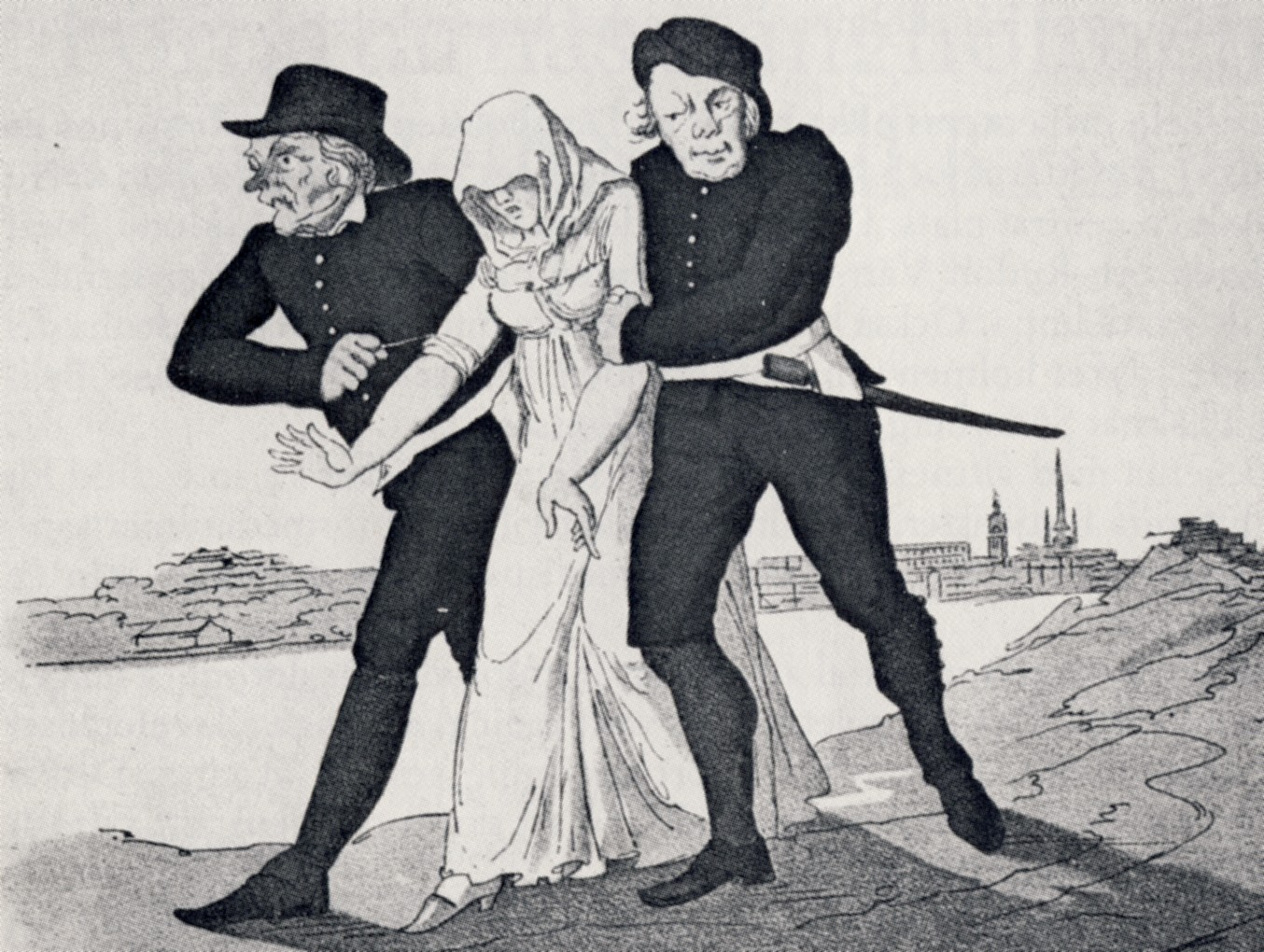
Prisoner being escorted by guards Illustration by Per Nordquist ca 1800

In 1746, the spinnhus was expanded and reconstituted as a prison. Alstavik was expanded on all sides and the former malmgården became a secluded building within the bigger compound at Långholmen.

During the latter half of the 1700s, a hospital, church, administration building, lighthouse and petty officer accommodations were built at Långholmen. The expansion work at Alstavik in 1772 increased the prison's capacity to 250 prisoners.

One of the prisoners during that time was Hanna Hansdotter from Scania, the last person in Sweden to be sentenced to death for witchcraft. She had her sentence reduced to life imprisonment with hard labour in September 1756. Another well-known inmate at the place was Magdalena Rudenschöld, considered to be the first political prisoner held there. She remained incarcerated at Långholmen between 1794 and 1796.

== Expansions in 1808 ==
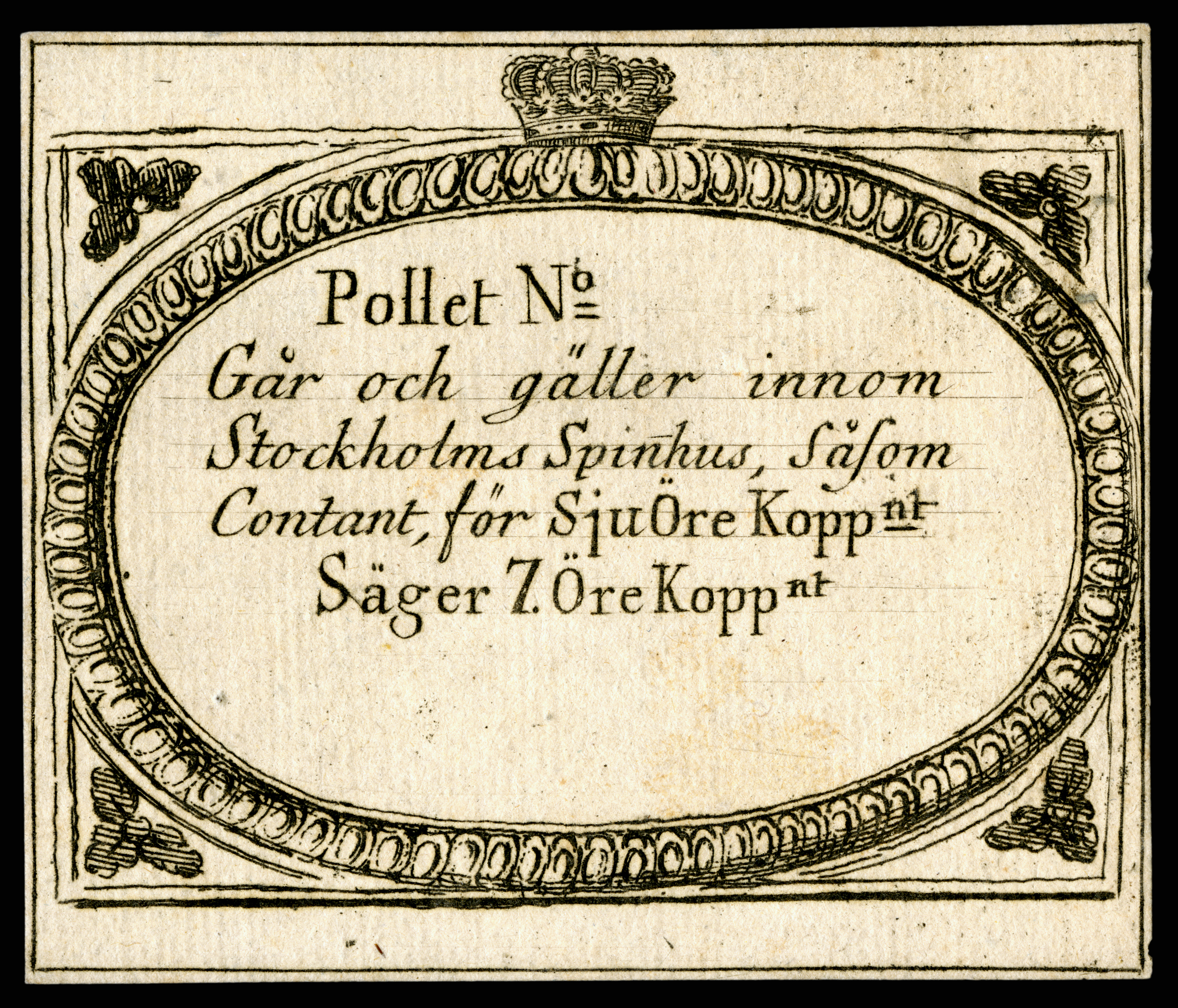
Seven Ore copper in prison currency (c. 1800)

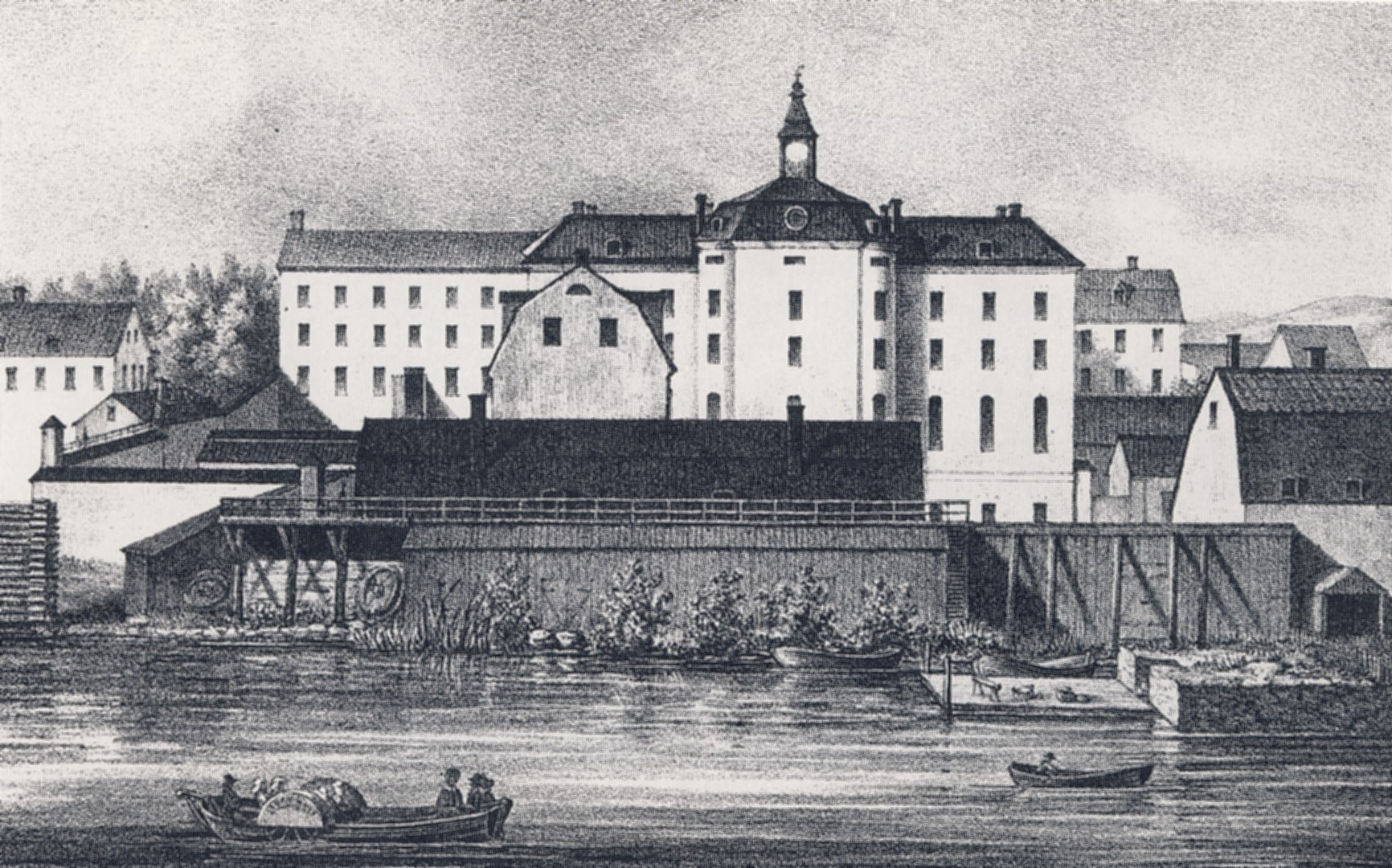
Långholmens spinnhus in the 1850s

In 1808, the board for the protection of the poor assumed the administration of the spinnhus. New expansion work was undertaken aiming at increasing the capacity of the institution, which stood at 290 prisoners. By 1818 more than 500 prisoners were held at Långholmen. An additional 127 prison cells were created by enlarging Långholmen's west wing. Until then, the prisoners had slept in bunk beds in dormitories with 12-16 beds in each hall. Prior to the expansion, it had proven difficult to provide the prisoners with enough work to keep them occupied. Afterwards, new space was provided to accommodate additional crafts such as shoemaking, sock production and blacksmithing, increasing the employment opportunities of the prison population.

In 1825, the spinnhus was put under state control following the establishment of the Swedish Board for prisons and work institutions. The spinnhus' status was subsequently changed to a work and correctional facility. The women prisoners were removed and were replaced by a male population. The same year, the women's spinnhus was moved to the central prison in Norrmalm, which was also run by the new Prison Board.

One woman imprisoned at the Långholmens spinnhus was Anna Birgitta Törnberg. She was born in 1800 in Stockholm. She was arrested in Uppsala in 1813, and at age 13 was placed as a prisoner at the Långholmens spinnhus. She remained there until she was given a work assignment two years later. During her time at the spinnhus, she also attended occupational-instruction workshops. Another inmate at Långholmen was Anna Maja Holmström who in 1813, at the age of 31, was given a life sentence for child murder. She died at the spinnhus on 7 July 1818 at the age of 36.

== Crime statistics ==
Throughout the period of operation of the Långholmen spinnhus the laws of 1734 remained in effect. The most common crimes during that time were:

- Assault: 24%
- Manslaughter: 4%
- Prostitution: 24%
- Stealing: 15%
- Escaping: 15%
- Disruptive behaviour: 7%
- Child choking: 3%
- Not listening to police: 2%
- Others: 5%
- Unknown: 1%

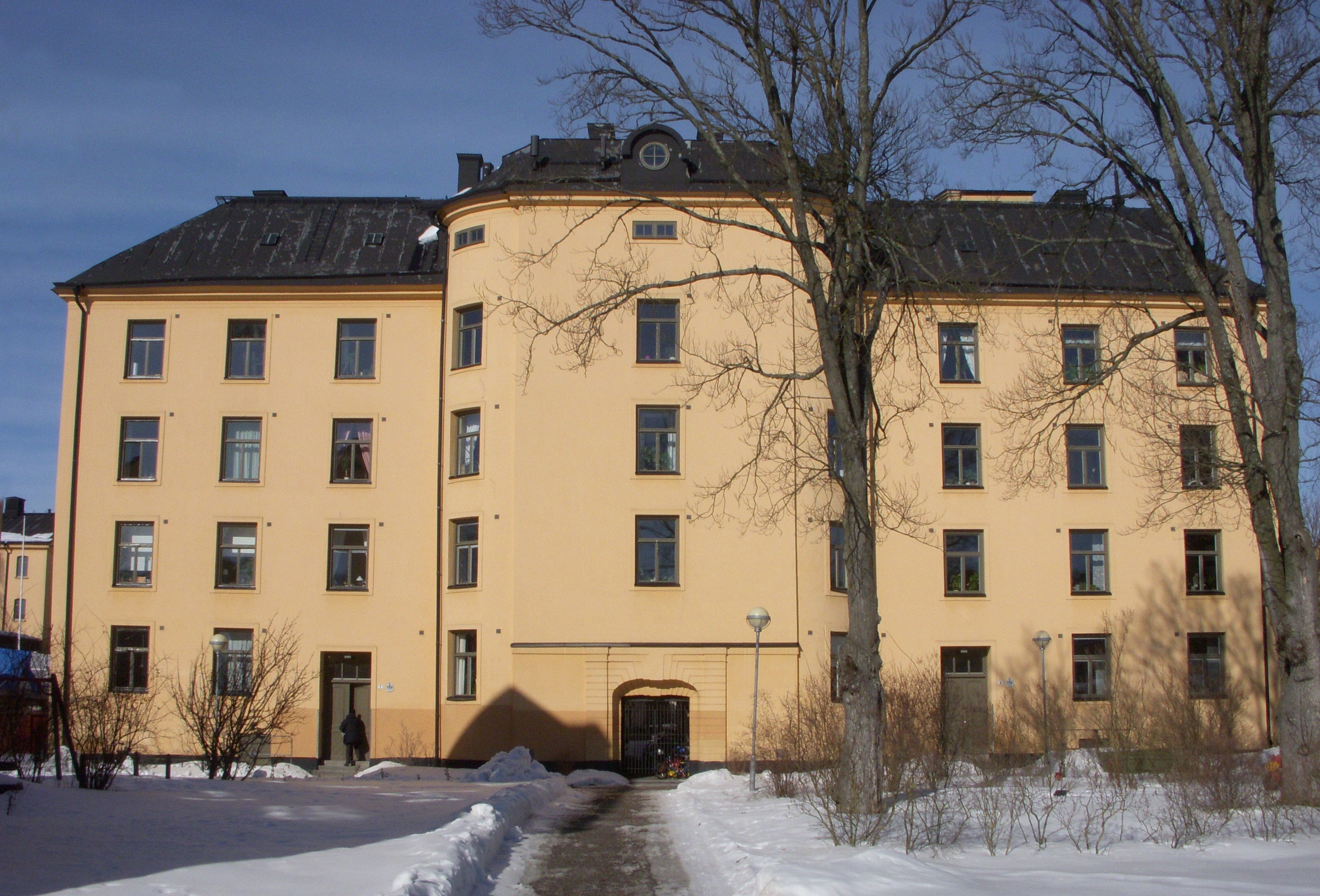
Långholmens Spinnhus in 2010

== Closing down and new uses ==
The Långholmens spinnhus was a part of the Långholmen Prison until the 1970s. The Stockholm city council and the state had agreed to decommission the spinnhus in 1955, but it took until 1972 to close it. In 1975 the prison was completely closed down. Today the buildings are used as a hotel and a museum. Part of the old spinnhus also accommodates a folk high school.

== Sources ==
- Kleberg, Carl-Johan (1990). Långholmen: den gröna ön (Print). Stockholm Solna: Kommittén för stockholmsforskning/Atlantis Distribution, Seelig. ISBN 9789170310195.
- Kleberg, Carl-Johan. Spinnhuset och fängelset under två sekler. Kommittén för stockholmsforskning, 1990.
