= Charlotte Slottsberg =

Swedish dancer

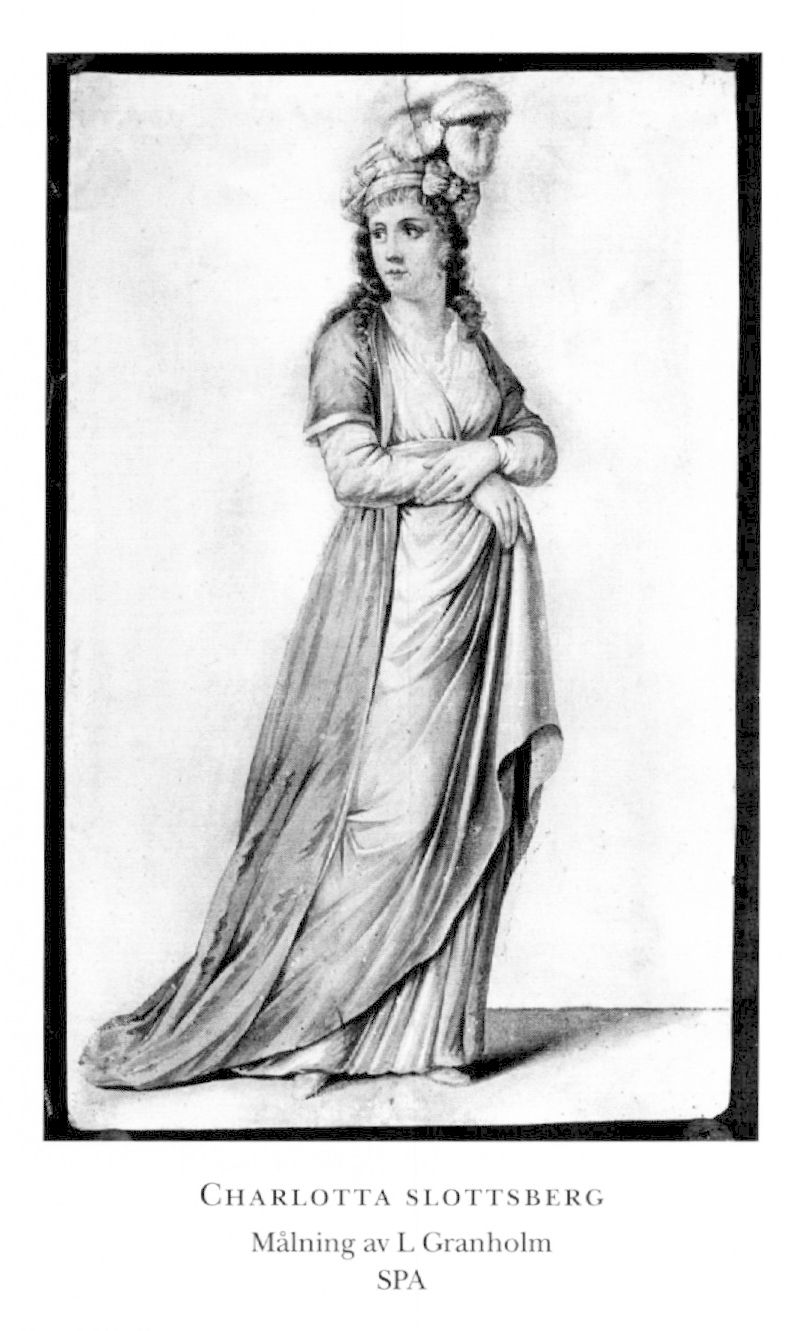
- Born: 29 May 1760; Stockholm, Sweden
- Died: 29 May 1800 (aged 40); Stockholm, Sweden
- Occupation: Ballerina
- Known for: Royal mistress
- Spouse: Adolph Granholm

Charlotte (Gustava Charlotta) Slottsberg (29 May 1760 – 29 May 1800) was a Swedish ballerina. She was one of the first native members of the Royal Swedish Ballet. She was also known as a courtesan and as the controversial mistress of the future Charles XIII of Sweden. She was the first native star of the Royal Swedish Ballet.

== Life ==
Charlotte Slottsberg was born in Stockholm as the daughter and only child of the wig maker Andreas Slottsberg and the dancer Lovisa Charlotta Schumbardt. The home was described as poor.

Her mother and maternal aunts were both active as dancers, and she was likely given her first training by them, and reportedly also performed with them during her childhood, though it is not confirmed where. Her father occasionally worked for the French theatre, where she came to know Louis Gallodier, and she was enrolled as a student of the French ballet during her childhood, and made her debut in a ballet at the age of eight at the Confidencen on Ulriksdal Palace in 1768. In October 1771, her mother "Madame Slottsberg" and her two aunts are both registered as members of the Ballet of the French theatre.

=== Career in the Royal Swedish ballet ===
When the French Du Londel theatre was dissolved by king Gustav III of Sweden after his succession to the throne in 1771, many of its ballet dancers were transferred to the newly founded Royal Swedish Ballet, as was Charlotte Slottsberg, her mother and aunts. At the foundation of the Royal Swedish Ballet and the Royal Swedish Opera, there were initially few trained native performers, particularly in the ballet, and foreign artists mainly from France and Italy were engaged to educate the first generation of Swedish ballet dancers, often consisting of the children of musicians and members of the domestic staff of the royal court: in the first ballet of 1773, Charlotte Slottsberg and Magdalena Lundblad are noted to have belonged to the minority of already trained native dancers.

On 18 January 1773, she participated in the famous opera Thetis och Pélée by Francesco Uttini at the inauguration performance of the Royal Swedish Opera (as well as the Royal Swedish Ballet) in the role of Virtue opposite her personal friend Betty Olin (daughter of Elisabeth Olin) as Love. Carl Christoffer Gjörwell called her "as beautiful as a spring day" and noted: "Our new M.lle Slottsberg will become one of the greatest dancers in Europe, and never set foot in the theatre without the most constant applause from the Royal box."

Charlotte Slottsberg arguably became the first native ballet celebrity in Sweden, during a time when the Swedish ballet was otherwise dominated by foreign dancers such as Elisabeth Soligny and Giovanna Bassi, and was a celebrated star of the Ballet. She was a favourite partner of the male star ballet dancer Antoine Bournonville, was appointed premier ballerina in the 1786–87 season.

Among the parts she danced was Aurora in the Procris och Cephal by Grétry with Carl Stenborg and Lovisa Augusti the season of 1777–78, Lucile in the pantomime ballet La Rosiére de Salency by Jean Marcadet with Antoine Bournonville and Carlo Uttini (1786–87), as Bellona opposite Giovanna Bassi as Pallas in the ballet made by Louis Gallodier to the opera Gustav Adolf och Ebba Brahe by Gustav III (1787–88).

"The undeniable girl" Slottsberg's performance in the opera Acis och Galathea by Lars Lalin after Händel the 1773–74 season was one of the few individual performances to receive unanimous admiration in that opera. On 22 September 1789 she played Elmira in Soliman och de tre sultaninnorna (Soliman and the three sultanesses) by Joseph Martin Kraus in the Royal Dramatic Theatre in Bollhuset.

=== Courtesan ===
Charlotte Slottberg was widely regarded as a high class courtesan in parallel to her career in the ballet, and she is known to have several rich lovers from whom she benefited financially. Her mother and her two maternal aunts were reportedly also prostitutes. Already in 1774, at the age of fourteen, she was reported to be the mistress of "the nasty old" Austrian ambassador count Joseph Clemens von Kaunitz-Rietberg, and she reportedly made her debut as prostitute to help her father out of a debt. Among her other known lovers were the statesmen count Fredrik Sparre and Carl Wilhelm Seele and several other men from the aristocracy and political and diplomatic world.

From 1777, she is known to have been the mistress of Prince Charles, Duke of Södermanland, brother to king Gustav III, who became the most known of all her lovers. Their affair continued on an on-an-off basis for about twenty years, was regarded a scandal and attracted much negative publicity to Duke Charles. Unlike her colleague in the Ballet, Sophie Hagman, who was the mistress of Charles' brother Prince Frederick, Charlotte Slottberg was never allowed to attend the royal court or have any position of an official mistress because of her reputation as a courtesan, and her affair with Charles was in contrast to that of Hagman and Prince Frederick never publicly acknowledged in any way. Their relationship was never exclusive in either part. In parallel to her, Duke Charles had a string of other lovers simultaneously - his affairs to Charlotte Eckerman and Françoise-Éléonore Villain, among others, all took place when Slottsberg was his mistress. Charlotte Slottsberg herself also had several acknowledged lovers in parallel to Charles. Nevertheless, Slottsberg was referred to as the "Favourite Sultaness" of his "harem" and as someone he always returned to in the end, and Johan Magnus af Nordin referred to her as "the Concubiness, the deputy duchess and regentess etc".

Charlotte Slottsberg is attributed influence over Duke Charles, and her purported influence exposed her to hostility. She is said to have given him an interest in culture, inspired him to attempt to write plays, and encouraged him to share her interest in champagne, and cheered him up when he was depressed. In 1790, she was rumoured to have been given an allowance from king Gustav III of Sweden in exchange for influencing his brother Charles to his advantage, which was commented to in a letter by Charles' sister, princess Sophia Albertina of Sweden on 13 April 1790: "He is truly so blinded and enchanted by that nasty Slottsberg, who makes him do all these stupid things and controls him: she is herself bought by the king, who provides her with a pension and inform her of everything, which he wants the duke to do."

The dislike of the alleged influence of Slottsberg became more intense during Charles' reign as regent during the minority of his nephew king Gustav IV Adolf of Sweden in 1792–96. It is not known if she ever met the de facto regent Gustaf Adolf Reuterholm or had any real influence, but she was often mentioned in the political debate. When silk and coffee was (temporarily) banned in an extremely disliked sumptuary law by the regency government, the public opinion pointed to the disregard for this law among the upper classes and "In Stockholm it was loudly said, that as long as the mamsell's Slottsberg and Löf (the mistresses of the duke) wore silk and all kinds of finery, such things should not be banned." During the pillorying of Magdalena Rudenschöld, who had been judged guilty of conspiracy against the regency government of Charles, the crowd was reportedly saying that Charlotte Slottsberg should have been standing on the platform instead of Rudenschöld, and an incident followed in which her carriage was attacked.

Duke Charles gave Slottsberg the honorary title Överfataburshustru - the title Fataburshustru was the title for the Mistress of the Royal Linen and Textiles and a non-aristocratic court office, but Slottsberg was called "Chief Fataburshustru" ('Överfataburshustru') and in practice had nothing to with the actual office. In 1795, Duke Charles further more allowed Charlotte Slottsberg to use a carriage of a design normally reserved for noblewomen introduced at the royal court - a carriage with seven glass windows - manned by guards in the livery of the Duke. This created a scandal and widespread dislike at court, voiced by the duchess, which caused the regent Duke Charles to see a need to make his relationship with Slottsberg less visible, he stopped allowing her to use this type of a carriage and drivers with his ducal livery.

In 1797, the relationship between Slottsberg and Duke Charles was finally terminated.

=== Private life ===
Through her connections, she acquired a substantial fortune. Charlotte Slottsberg lived in an apartment furnished in great luxury in Stockholm. She also had a country estate in Järva near Ulriksdal Palace. Slottberg was described as a confident woman but also as vulgar, rude and provocative. On one occasion, she attracted attention by racing through the streets of the capital in an expensive carriage after black horses.

Privately, Slottsberg was in love with the cavalry rider Adolf Fredrik Heitmüller, who reportedly pawned the jewelry given to her by Duke Charles.

In 1799, she married captain Adolph Granholm, a former marine officer: he was the same age as she and described as good looking but "stupid as an ox." She died in Stockholm in a heart attack after a miscarriage.

After her death, her former lover Duke Charles confiscated her fortune despite the protests of her widower and her surviving mother, claiming that she had debts to him which amounted to the value of her entire estate. This was considered a scandal and "not very royal" of him. Charlotte Slottsberg was given a grand funeral.

=== Letter of Charlotte Slottsberg ===
In one of her letters to count Sparre, she inform him that she had noticed that a letter from the duke had been taken from her room. The letter, which is partially misspelled, is a part of the Sparre collection and quite well known:

Noble Sire. When I am so bold as to write a few lines to your Excellency, I would most humbly ask Y. Ex. not to take offence if I remind you of the letter which Y. Ex. took from the pot in my bed room and which I did not with consent allow Y. Ex to take with him and it is now the second time I write to Y. Ex. about this without having it been given back to me and I did not expect such a noble gentlemen to behave this way. I must receive it before tonight if not the highly distinguished gentleman who will come to me then and who left the letter with me will know that it has left my rooms, but I will have to be as bold to say, that if it is not back by then, I will say that your Excellency have taken the letter with him and that is something you do not wish for anything, and except the agony I have now suffered for the sake of Y. Ex, everything will be forgotten if I have the letter returned and Y.Ex. can be assured of as much favouritism as before. The letter must be with me at nine o'clock this evening. Your Excellency's most humble servant Ch. Slottsberg.
