= List of political conspiracies =

This is a list of political conspiracies. In a political context, a conspiracy refers to a group of people united in the goal of overthrowing an established political power, often through a revolutionary coup d'état or assassination.

== List ==
- 1971 BCE - Apophis Kush Alliance against Egypt as attested to in the second Kamose stele
- 399 BCE – Conspiracy of Cinadon to overthrow the government of ancient Sparta to grant rights to helots and poorer Spartans
- 63 BCE - First Catilinarian conspiracy and the Second Catilinarian conspiracy
- 44 BCE - Liberatores plot assassination of Julius Caesar to restore Roman Republic
- 65 CE - Pisonian conspiracy against Nero
- 1478 Pazzi conspiracy, a plot by Pope Sixtus IV and the Pazzi family to depose the House of Medici in the Republic of Florence
- 1506 - Conspiracy against the life of the brothers Alfonso I d'Este, Duke of Ferrara and Cardinal Ippolito d'Este in the Duchy of Ferrara, coordinated by their half brother Giulio d'Este and full brother Ferrante d'Este
- 1569 - 1569 Plot against John III of Sweden.
- 1570 - Ridolfi plot against Elizabeth I of England
- 1574 - Mornay Plot against John III of Sweden.
- 1583 - Throckmorton Plot by English Catholics led by Sir Francis Throckmorton to coordinate an invasion of England led by Henry I, Duke of Guise, to murder Elizabeth, and replace her with her cousin Mary, Queen of Scots
- 1586 - Babington Plot, plot by Anthony Babington and John Ballard to assassinate Elizabeth and coordinate an invasion of England by King Philip II of Spain and the Holy League. Discovered by Sir Francis Walsingham and led to execution of Mary, Queen of Scots
- 1603 - Main Plot to remove James I of England and enthrone Arbella Stuart allegedly led by Henry Brooke, Lord Cobham, and sponsored by Spain.
- 1603 - Bye Plot, leads to the execution of Sir George Brooke
- 1605 - Gunpowder Plot to blow up the House of Lords during the State Opening of Parliament as prelude to a popular revolt in the Midlands, during which James's nine-year-old daughter, Princess Elizabeth, was to be installed as the Catholic head of state; foiled after a letter to William Parker, 4th Baron Monteagle, and the discovery and arrest of Guy Fawkes. Often called the Gunpowder Treason Plot; origin of Guy Fawkes Day
- 1683 - Rye House Plot to assassinate King Charles II and the Duke of York. The plot was never enacted due (in part) to bad weather. Several alleged conspirators imprisoned and executed; the king's illegitimate son the Duke of Monmouth was implicated and left the country.
- 1718–1720 The Pontcallec conspiracy during the minority of Louis XV to overthrow the Regent Philippe II, Duke of Orléans in favour of Philip V of Spain
- 1749 - Conspiracy of the Slaves by Muslim slaves in Hospitaller-ruled Malta to kill Grand Master Manuel Pinto da Fonseca and take over the island with the help of the Barbary states.
- 1756 - Coup of 1756 was an attempted coup d'état planned by Queen Louisa Ulrika of Sweden to abolish the rule of the Riksdag of the Estates and reinstate absolute monarchy in Sweden.
- 1788 - Anjala conspiracy
- 1789 - 1789 Conspiracy (Sweden) against Gustav III of Sweden.
- 1793 - Armfelt Conspiracy against Charles XIII of Sweden.
- 1796 – The Conspiracy of the Equals, led by François-Noël 'Gracchus' Babeuf, which attempted to overthrow the Directoire
- 1807 - The Burr conspiracy, an alleged plot by former Vice President of the United States Aaron Burr and a cabal of his supporters to establish an independent country in the American Southwest. The accusations would lead to Burr being arrested and later indicted for treason.
- 1820 - The Cato Street Conspiracy, a plot to murder all the British Cabinet Ministers and the Prime Minister Lord Liverpool. A police informer resulted in the arrest of 13 plotters. Five conspirators were executed and five others were transported to Australia.
- 1832 - Georgian plot, assassination of the Russian imperial administration and restoration of the Georgian monarchy
- 1865 - Abraham Lincoln assassination plot, to include assassination of cabinet members. It had originated as a plot by Confederate sympathizers to kidnap Lincoln and force the Union to negotiate for either a release of prisoners of war or an end to the American Civil War.
- 1898 - The Dreyfus Affair, a coordinated attempt to falsely accuse Alfred Dreyfus of treason
- 1914 - The Serbian secret society known as the Black Hand colluded with members of the revolutionary group Young Bosnia to organize and carry out the assassination of Archduke Franz Ferdinand of Austria-Hungary on 28 June 1914 in Sarajevo; precipitating an international crisis that resulted in the outbreak of World War I a month later.
- 1924 - Delitto Matteotti: the murder of the main Italian political opponent of emerging fascism
- 1933 - Business Plot, a plan by American business leaders to overthrow U.S. President Franklin Delano Roosevelt and to install a military leader named General Smedley Butler as fascist dictator of the country.
- 1941 - Operation Spark, a planned attempt on the life of Adolf Hitler.
- 1944 - July 20 Plot - An attempt to assassinate Hitler with suitcase bomb at a conference at the Wolf's Lair in Rastenburg, East Prussia, and then use Operation Valkyrie to grab power
- 1945 - The Soviet Union's infiltration of the Manhattan Project through atomic spies such as George Koval and Klaus Fuchs. Soviet intelligence was eventually confirmed by a declassified U.S. Army Corps of Engineers report and the Venona project, and assisted the Soviet atomic bomb project.
- 1951 - Rawalpindi conspiracy - failed coup against Liaquat Ali Khan, Prime Minister of Pakistan.
- 1953 - Iranian coup d'état - The Imperial Iranian Armed Forces restores the Shah of Iran, Mohammad Reza Pahlavi, and overthrows Prime Minister Mohammad Mosaddegh with the aid of CIA and MI6.
- 1956–1971 - COINTELPRO - FBI’s covert program to surveil, infiltrate, and disrupt civil rights groups, anti-war activists, and political dissidents.
- 1959 - Bangkok Plot - a plan to overthrow Premier of Cambodia Prince Norodom Sihanouk, formulated by Cambodian politicians with international support.
- 1964 - Gulf of Tonkin Incident - The U.S. falsely claimed North Vietnam attacked its ships to justify escalating the Vietnam War, leading to over 58,000 American deaths.
- 1967–1974 - Operation CHAOS - CIA’s domestic surveillance operation against anti-war activists, violating its own charter prohibiting domestic spying.
- 1971 - Ugandan coup d'état - Ugandan Army units loyal to General Idi Amin deposed the government of President Milton Obote while he was abroad attending the annual Commonwealth Heads of Government Meeting.
- 1971 - The Pentagon Papers - Documents showing that multiple administrations misled the public about the Vietnam War from the 1940s to the 1970s.
- 1972 - Watergate scandal - The burglary of the Democratic National Committee offices at the Watergate complex by CREEP and subsequent cover-up scandals that forced President Richard Nixon to resign in 1974.
- 1973 - Chilean coup d'état - a group of military officers led by General Augusto Pinochet and backed by the CIA seized power from democratically-elected leftist President Salvador Allende, ending civilian rule and establishing a U.S.-backed dictatorship
- 1981 - 23F - An attempted coup d'état or putsch in Spain by the military where politicians in the Congress of Deputies were held hostage for 18 hours. King Juan Carlos I denounced the coup in a televised address. This caused the coup to eventually collapse.
- 1982 - Propaganda Due - an international, illegal, clandestine far-right criminal organization and secret society led by Licio Gelli from 1966 until its ban in 1982.
- 1984 - Brighton hotel bombing - attempted assassination of Margaret Thatcher and her cabinet by the Provisional IRA at the Grand Hotel in Brighton, resulted in the death of Deputy Chief Whip Anthony Berry.
- 1984 - Rajneeshee bioterror attack
- 1987 - Iran-Contra Affair - a years' long secret project by the Reagan Administration to topple the government of Nicaragua by illegally selling weapons to the government of Iran to fund the terrorist group the Contras in violation of U.S. law (the Boland Amendment).
- 1990 - Nayirah testimony, a false testimony to the Congressional Human Rights Caucus organized by public relations firm Hill & Knowlton for the Kuwaiti government
- 1991 - The 1991 Soviet coup attempt, also known as the August Coup, was a failed attempt by hardliners of the Communist Party of the Soviet Union (CPSU) to forcibly seize control of the country from Mikhail Gorbachev, who was Soviet President and General Secretary of the CPSU at the time.
- 2001 - September 11 attacks - Attacks on the World Trade Center in New York City, the Pentagon in Arlington, Virginia, and a planned fourth target in Washington D.C. using hijacked airplanes by al-Qaeda.
- 2003 - Plame affair - publication of Valerie Plame's employment as a covert CIA officer by Robert Novak, who learned it from Richard Armitage, after her husband Joseph C. Wilson published a New York Times op-ed expressing doubt that Saddam Hussein purchased uranium from Niger. Led to conviction of Scooter Libby for obstruction of justice and perjury.
- 2015 - November 2015 Paris attacks - attacks on targets in Paris, including an Eagles of Death Metal concert at the Bataclan theatre and the Stade de France in Saint-Denis, conducted by coordinated teams of Islamic terrorists affiliated with ISIS.
- 2021- After losing to Joe Biden in the 2020 Presidential Election, Donald Trump, along with many of his staffers, appointed officials, and Republican elected officials, conspired to overturn the election by falsely claiming widespread voter fraud, culminating in the January 6th, 2021 attack at the United States Capitol by mob of Trump supporters, in order to illegally keep Trump in power.
- 2025 - Conspiracy theories surrounding the assassination of Charlie Kirk, the American conservative activist and Turning Point USA co-founder who was shot at Utah Valley University on 10 September 2025, claim that the killing was an inside job orchestrated by Turning Point USA staff and Erika Kirk, or a "hit" ordered by Israel. Fact-checkers found no credible evidence for these claims, and authorities attribute the shooting to a single suspect acting alone.

=== Fabricated conspiracies ===
- 1924 - The Zinoviev letter, published in the Daily Mail in London before the 1924 general election, is a forgery that impacted the vote. It was signed with the name of Grigory Zinoviev, a politician in the Soviet Union and the leader of the Communist International, and called on violent action by the Communist Party of Great Britain. It was devised by anti-Communist White Russian émigrés in Paris and the Labour Party blamed it for its defeat.
- 1938 - Presumed Hitler Youth Conspiracy, NKVD case in Moscow involving some 70 arrests and 40 executions of teenagers and adults, later found to be baseless

=== False flag operations ===
- 1931 - The Mukden Incident or the Manchurian Incident - The Imperial Japanese Army sabotaged a railway section near a Chinese garrison at Beidaying as a pretext for a Japanese invasion of Manchuria.
- 1939 - Shelling of Mainila - false-flag artillery attack by the Red Army to provide the Soviet Union with a pretext for the Winter War against Finland.
- 1939 - Operation Himmler and its Gleiwitz incident - false-flag attacks, including on a radio station in Gleiwitz, by Nazi Germany and SS officers disguised as Polish Armed Forces personnel as a pretext for the invasion of Poland
- 1954 - Lavon affair or Operation Susannah, false flag terrorism by Mossad

== See also ==
- List of assassinations
- List of coups and coup attempts by country
- List of terrorist incidents
- List of conspiracy theories
- Seditious conspiracy
- History of espionage
