= Hedvig Elisabeth Charlotte of Holstein-Gottorp =

Queen of Sweden from 1809 to 1818

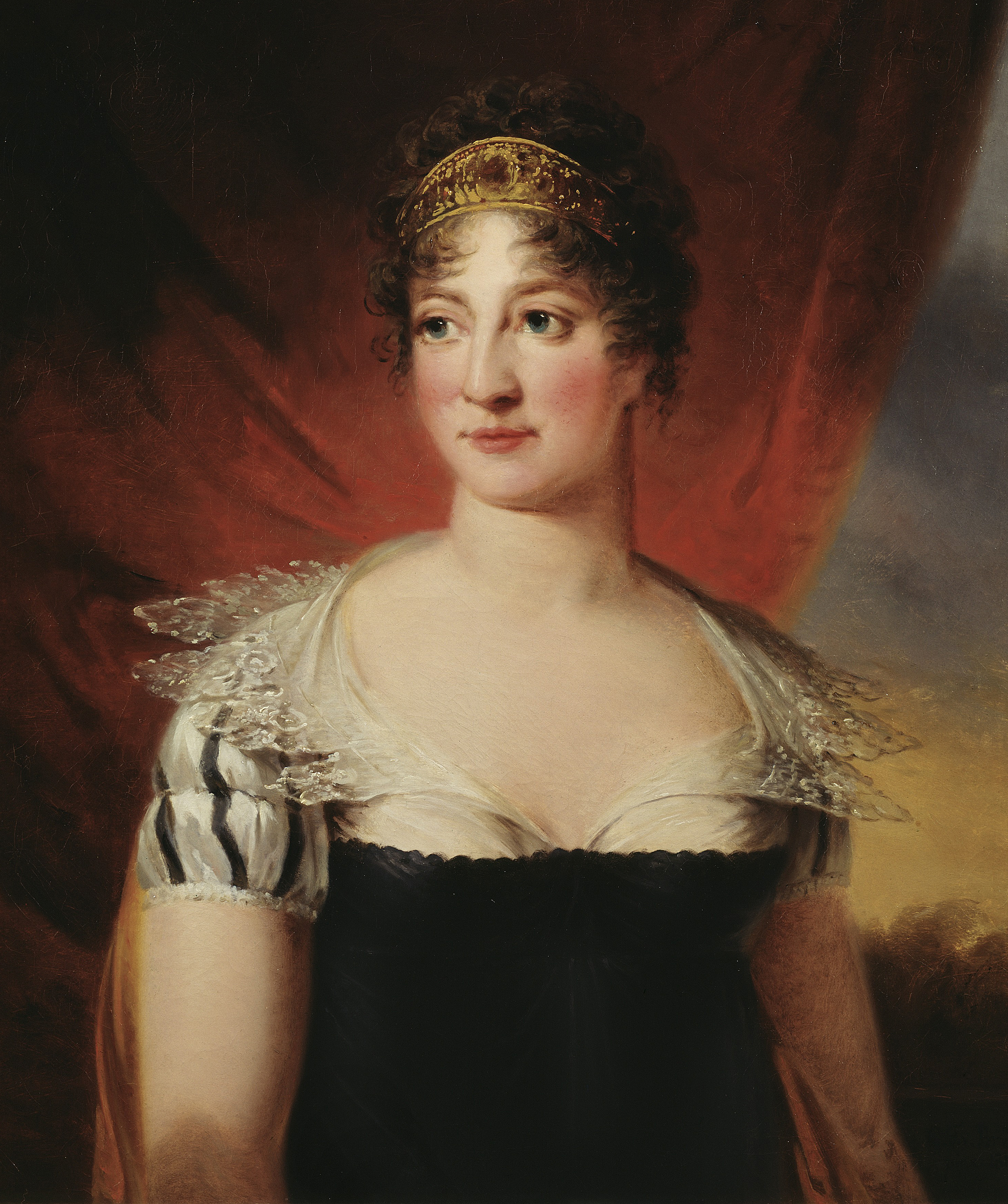
- Portrait by Carl Frederik von Breda, 1814

Queen consort of Sweden
- Tenure: 5 June 1809 – 5 February 1818
- Coronation: 29 June 1809, Storkyrkan, Stockholm

Queen consort of Norway
- Tenure: 4 November 1814 – 5 February 1818
- Born: 22 March 1759; Eutin, Prince-bishopric of Lübeck (now Germany)
- Died: 20 June 1818 (aged 59); Rosendal Palace, Stockholm, Sweden
- Burial: Riddarholmen Church
- Spouse: Charles XIII of Sweden (m. 1774; died 1818)
- Issue: Princess Louise Hedvig; Prince Carl Adolf, Duke of Värmland
- House: Holstein-Gottorp
- Father: Frederick August I, Duke of Oldenburg
- Mother: Ulrike Friederike Wilhelmine of Hesse-Kassel
- Religion: Lutheranism

Hedwig Elisabeth Charlotte of Holstein-Gottorp (Swedish: Hedvig Elisabet Charlotta; 22 March 1759 – 20 June 1818) was the queen consort of Charles XIII of Sweden and II of Norway. She was also a famed diarist, memoirist and wit. She is known as Hedwig Elisabeth Charlotte, though her official name as queen was Charlotte (Charlotta).

She was born in Eutin the daughter of Duke Frederick August I of Holstein-Gottorp and Princess Ulrike Friederike Wilhelmine of Hesse-Kassel. She grew up in Eutin and married her cousin Charles, Duke of Södermanland, in Stockholm on 7 July 1774 when she was fifteen years old. The marriage was arranged by King Gustav III to provide the throne of Sweden with an heir. The King had not consummated his marriage and had decided to give the task of providing an heir to the throne to his brother.

== Royal Duchess ==
Prince Charles saw her for the first time in Eutin in 1770 and remarked that she was pretty. The marriage was suggested in 1772, and the first ceremony took place in Wismar on 21 June 1774. She arrived in Sweden on 3 June and entered Stockholm by Vasaorden royal barge, a type of gondola, on 7 June. The wedding ceremony took place the same night, followed by a masquerade ball in Kungsträdgården. She was noted for her perceived beauty – her waist measured a mere 48 cm (19") and her shoe size 31 (girls' size 13) – and, as the marriage of the monarch had not been consummated after nine years, there were hopes that she would provide an heir to the throne.

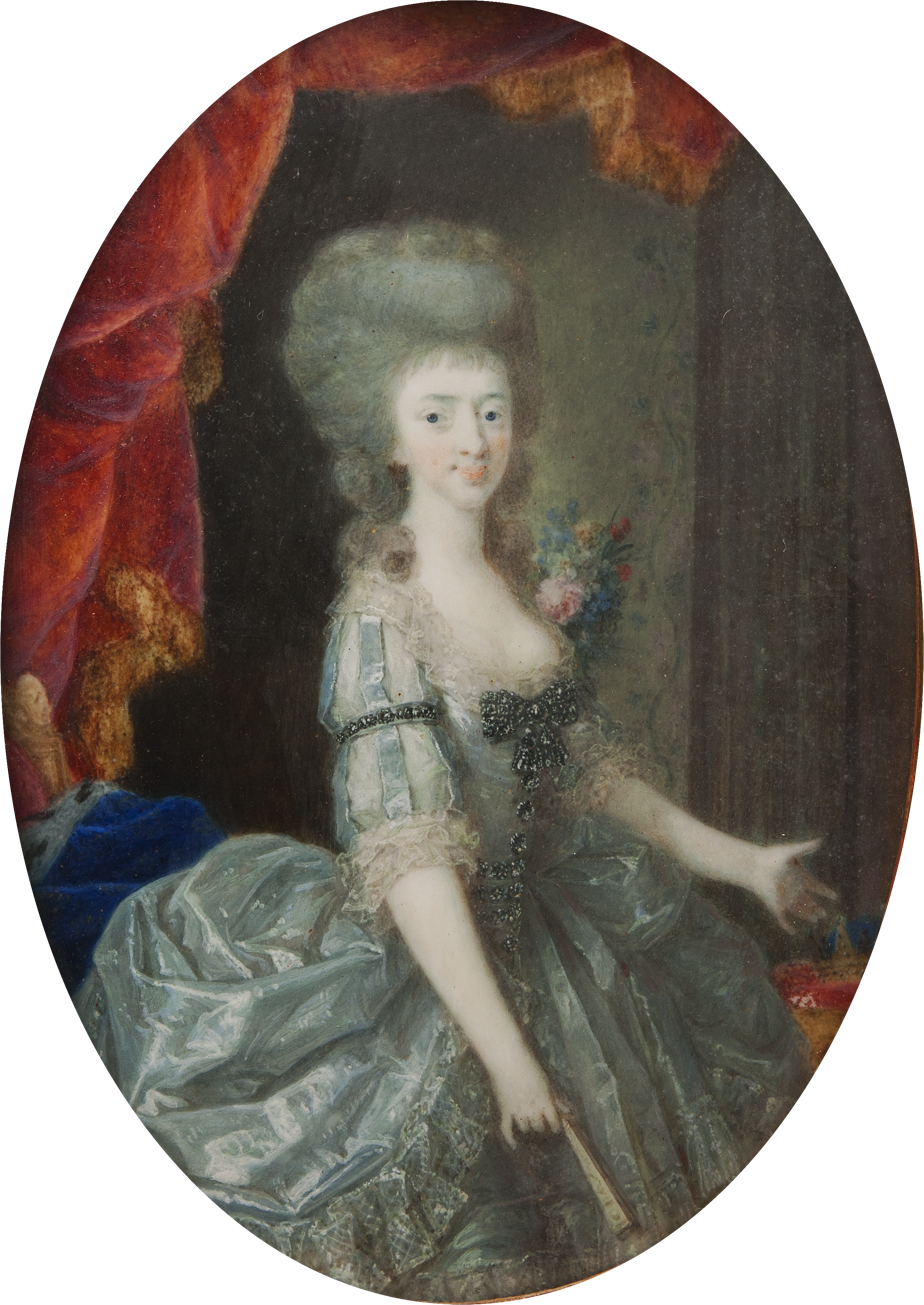
Princess Hedwig Elizabeth Charlotta of Holstein-Gottorp by Cornelius Hoeyer 1780's.

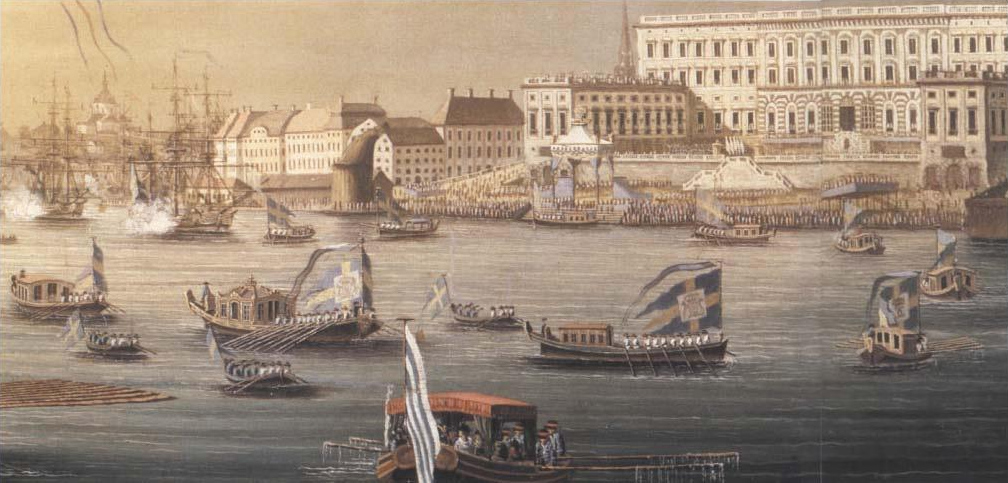
Painting of the official entry of Princess Hedwig Elisabeth Charlotte in Stockholm on 7 July 1774.

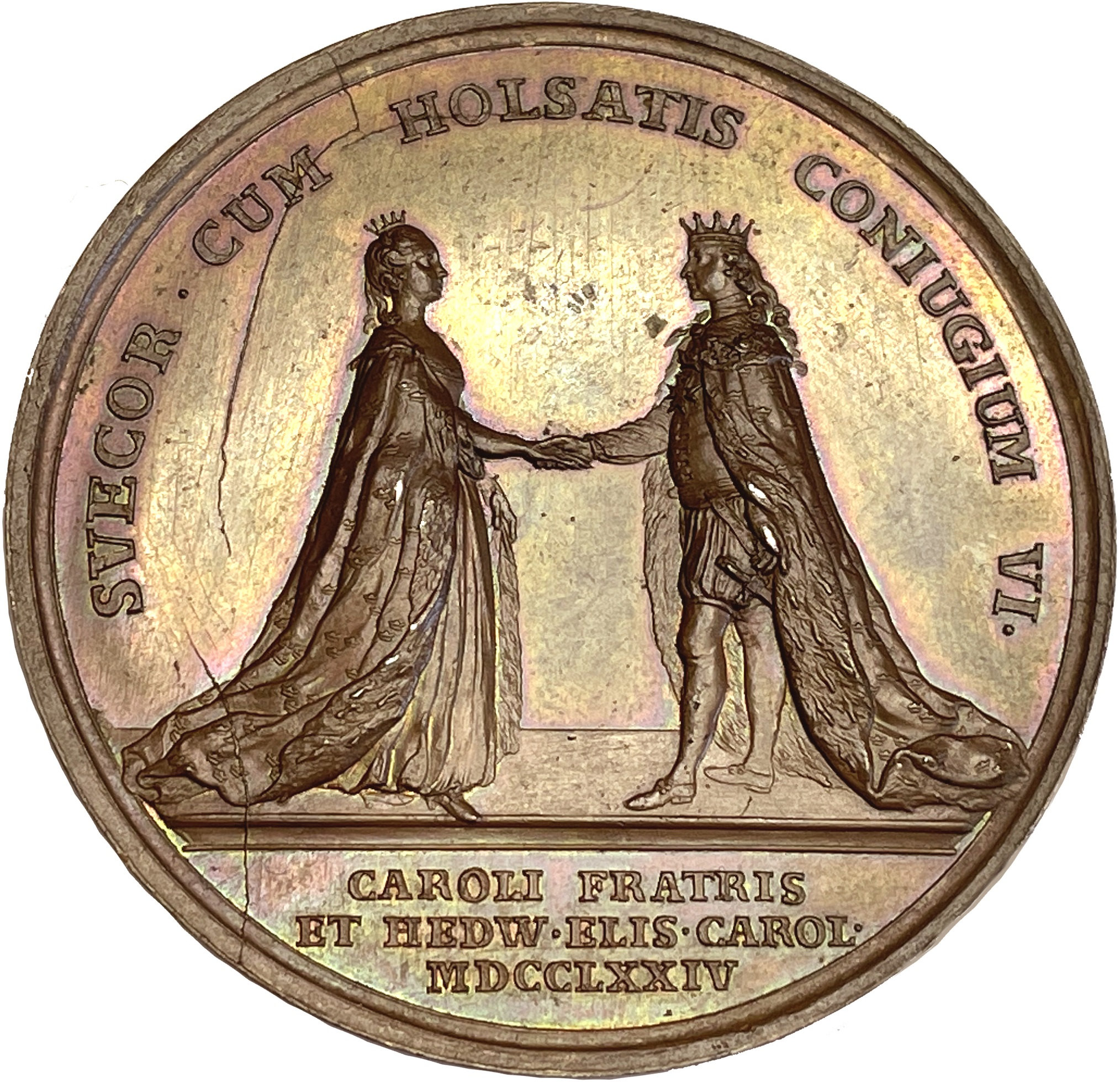
Medal of the Duke and Duchess of Södermanland's wedding 1774.

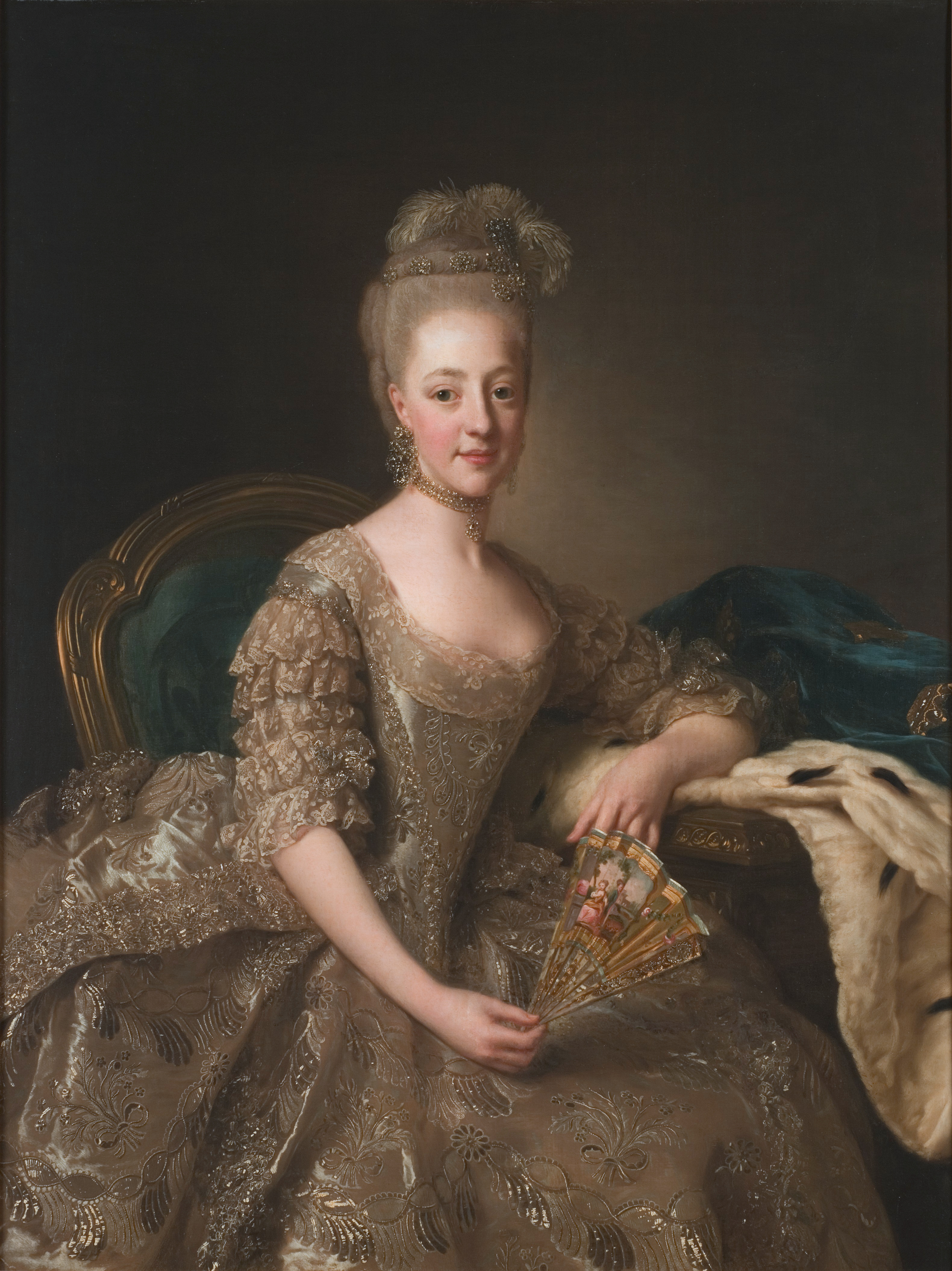
Hedvig Elisabeth Charlotte, Duchess of Södermanland. Portrait by Alexander Roslin, 1774.

The wedding dress of Hedvig Elisabeth Charlotte of Holstein-Gottorp worn when she married on July 1774.

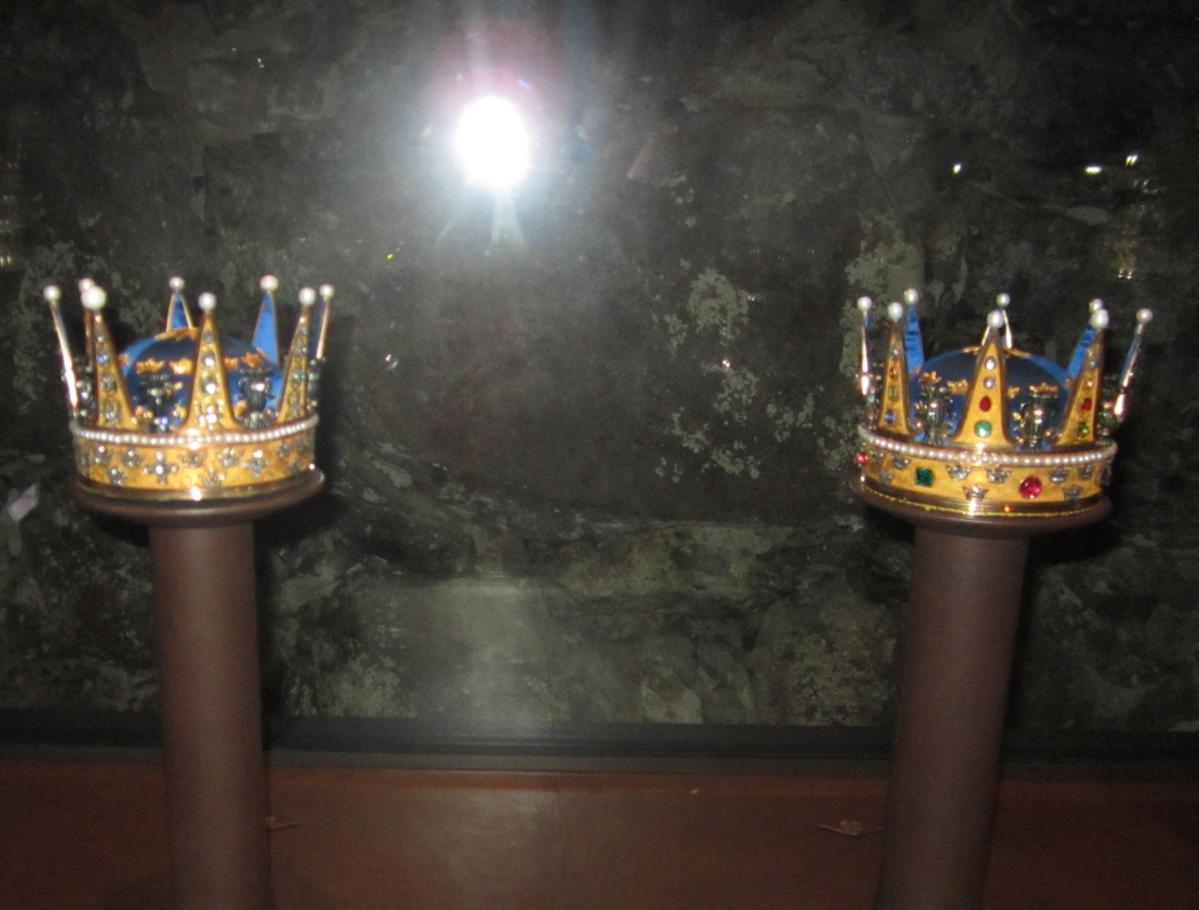
Coronet (right) created for Charlotte as Princess of Sweden in 1778.

In January 1775, there were signs that she was pregnant. It was hoped that the question of succession was solved, and prayers were held in the churches. However, the signs soon proved to be false. The news of the false pregnancy also made the king decide to consummate his marriage and provide an heir to the throne personally.

She made a personal success with her temperament and became a center of the royal court, where she was for some time informally called "Little Duchess" and was noticed for her perceived beauty and ease with words. In contrast to the supposedly shy Queen, Sophia Magdalena of Denmark, "Duchess Lotta" was seen as witty and flirtatious, and was in many ways the female center of the court. It was said of her: "One can not imagine anything more lively and cheerful. She is joy itself. Her greatest pleasure is to make up jokes and foolishness. It would be a good thing, if she introduced that custom, as our by nature somewhat melancholic nation could need some cheering up."

She participated in the amateur theatre which was an important part at the royal court during the reign of Gustav III, both as an actress and as a dancer. Her dancing was seen as scandalous by some, as ballet dancers were during this age regarded as prostitutes. After being subjected to criticism that she and Princess Sophia Albertina distracted the King from the affairs of state by the pursuit of pleasure, she retired from the stage in 1783.

Her marriage was distant and both she and her spouse had extramarital affairs. Charles paid more attention to his lovers than to her: at the time of their marriage, he was in the middle of his relationship with Augusta von Fersen. Her intimate friendship with Countess Sophie von Fersen inspired rumors of bisexuality which, true or not, were repeated throughout her time as royal Duchess, by both Francisco de Miranda in 1786 and later by Frederica of Baden. From 1783, she had a long term relationship with Count Carl Piper, whom she herself referred to as her lover in her secret correspondence to Sophie von Fersen.

Among her alleged lovers was Count Axel von Fersen, alleged lover of Marie Antoinette, and Sophie von Fersen's brother. It is not known when her affair with Axel von Fersen occurred; it is only known that she wished to resume it when Fersen returned to Sweden after the death of Marie Antoinette and that Fersen refused to do so. It has been suggested that this was merely a temporary affair which occurred during the stay of the royal court at Gripsholm Castle in the summer of 1784. She also had a relationship with Axel von Fersen's younger brother, Count Fabian von Fersen Her affair with Fabian von Fersen is assumed to have started in the late 1780s and was discontinued with the marriage of von Fersen in 1797. It was rumored at the time that the pregnancy, which ended in a miscarriage in 1792 (and which was referred by Hedvig Elisabeth Charlotte as her first real pregnancy), was caused by Fabian von Fersen. The rumors of her extramarital affairs were given a lot of attention during her second pregnancy in 1797, which produced a stillborn daughter. The next year (1798) she gave birth a son who lived only six days. Ultimately, she was unable to have living children.

She was indifferent to the affairs of her spouse as they gave her the opportunity to live more freely herself, and she expressed her frustration when her husband's lack of lovers made him more focused toward her, which exposed her to his suspicions and accusations:

"As long as he had his mistresses, things were better, but since the last one was exiled because she allowed herself to be insolent towards the King, and he has neglected to provide himself with a new one, his temperament has grown worse, and I have daily been subjected to outbursts because of this, which has occurred even in front of the staff. This hostility have increased so much during the winter that I have reached the end of my patience."

She expressed her views upon love and sexuality. Gustav III studied certain letters after his late mother in the company of others, as they contained information regarding the alleged love affair between his mother, Queen Louisa Ulrika, and Count Carl Gustaf Tessin, and the complaints from Adolf Frederick, King of Sweden over the attention Tessin gave his consort:

"It is undoubtedly so, that these papers can give reason for reflection; it does lead me to consider how easily a poor woman is judged and how unfortunate it is to have a heart filled with emotion, for a tender nature is a misfortune as well as a blessing, and no human can resist the power of love, even though friendship must at times be the comfort for the wise one, yes, nothing is more true than the inscription who were once placed upon the image of God of Love: 'Eho you are, her is your true master, he has been, he is and always will be.' You have to admit, my dear friend, that woman is truly an unhappy creature: while men have their complete freedom, she is always burdened by prejudice and circumstance; you may say, that men also have that hindrance, but it is not in equal degree. I am convinced that most women would ask for nothing more than to be transformed to men to escape the unhappy bondage and enjoy their full freedom."

In 1782, she participated as a mediator in the reconciliation between Gustav III and his mother at her deathbed, after they had been in conflict since 1778, when the Queen Dowager supported the rumour that the Crown Prince was illegitimate and the son of Count Adolf Fredrik Munck af Fulkila.

During the Russo-Swedish War (1788–1790), Hedvig Elisabeth Charlotte entered into politics. Sweden's ally France was displeased about the war, and Gustav III gave her the task to act as the go-between in his negotiations with the French ambassador. In cooperation with the daughter of the ambassador, her friend Camille du Bois de la Motte, she handled the correspondence between the monarch and the ambassador, arranged secret meetings between them and acted as witness to them upon the King's request. This caused a rift between her and the King when she realized that she had in fact been used to distract the ambassador. Adolf Fredrik Munck later blackened her in the eyes of the King by claiming that France was informed about the Swedish war plans through her friendship with Camille du Bois de la Motte. Knowing that her correspondence was read, she maintained a secret correspondence through her own net of couriers.

During the Riksdag of 1789, she was present with her sister-in-law, Princess Sophie Albertina during the sessions through a secret window which faced the assembly hall. The Union and Security Act placed the King in opposition with his nobility. The female members of the nobility, led by Jeanna von Lantingshausen, issued a political demonstration in a social boycott of the monarch by refusing to participate in his court life while continuing to visit Hedvig Elisabeth Charlotte and her sister-in-law Sophie Albertine, who were known to be in opposition to the Security Act, and who demonstrated themselves by refusing to participate in representation. This was effective, because the Queen, Sophia Magdalena, was reclusive and Hedvig Elisabeth Charlotte and Sophie Albertine had always fulfilled most of the representation at court, and the King accused her of leading: "A guard which placed themselves above all authority. They captivate the senses by their beauty and talents and rule the views and interests". The demonstration was effectively put to a halt when the King had Jeanna von Lantingshausen banished from court and refused any contact with his sister and his sister-in-law.

Hedvig Elisabeth Charlotte had a network of influential males whom she benefited and who made her services in turn: among them Erik Ruuth, Rutger Macklier, Jacob De la Gardie, Gustaf Mauritz Armfelt and Gustaf Adolf Reuterholm, with whom she maintained connections through her activity as a Freemason. She aided Reuterholm on his way to a position as de facto regent during the minor regency of Gustav IV Adolf. During the Riksdag of 1789, she supported Adolf Ludvig Stierneld as leader of the opposition, and when he was imprisoned, she asked Gustaf Mauritz Armfelt to request his release from Gustav III.

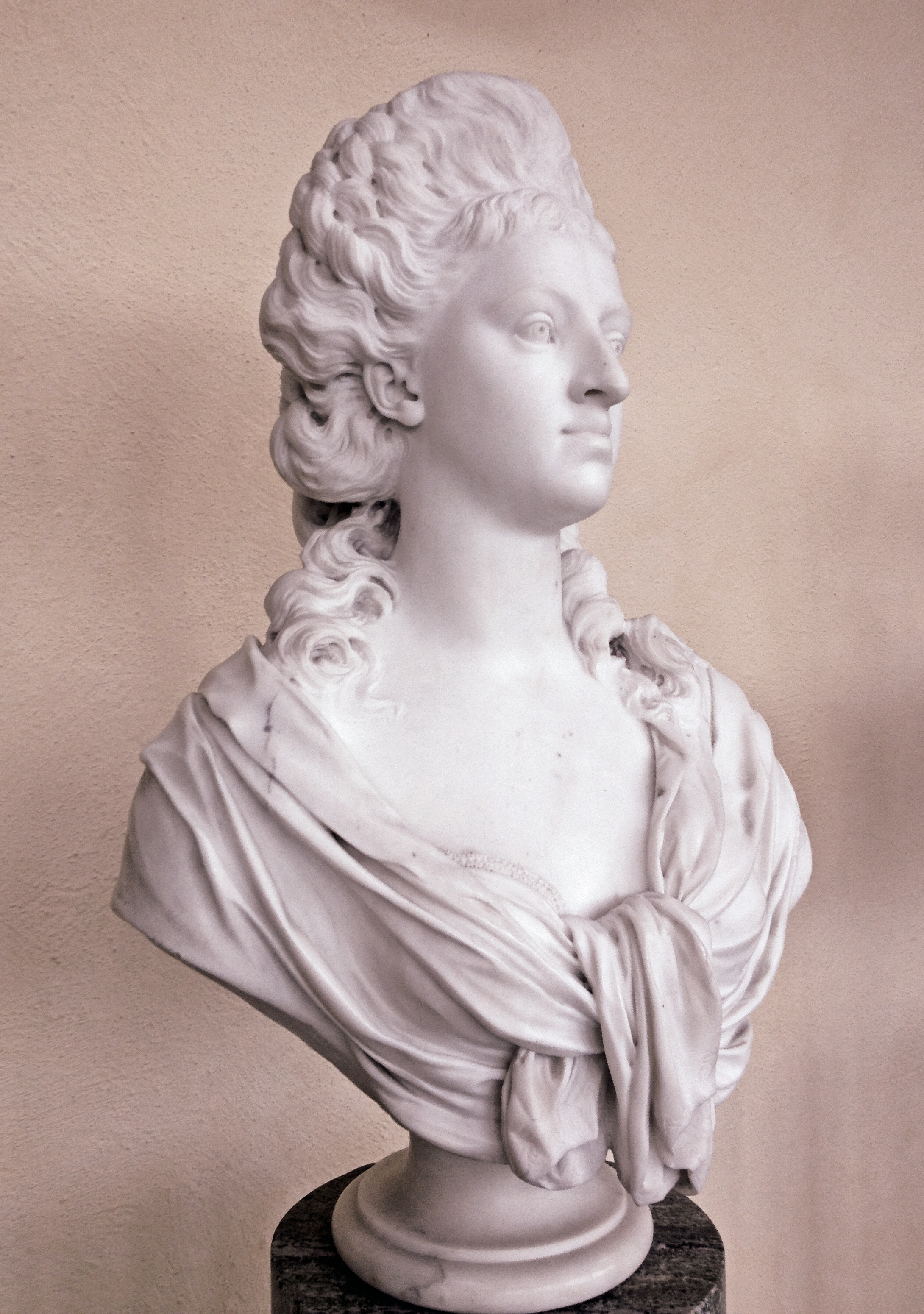
Hedvig Elisabeth Charlotte of Holstein-Gottorp, bust by Johan Tobias Sergel, 1791.

The autumn of 1789, Hedvig Elisabeth Charlotte played a central role in a conspiracy to depose Gustav III and place her husband Duke Charles upon the throne. Her ideal was the Swedish Constitution of 1772, which she saw as a good tool for an enlightened aristocracy, and the war and the Union and Security Act had made her a leading part of the opposition. She cooperated with Prince Frederick Adolf of Sweden and Gustaf Adolf Reuterholm. The plan was to force Charles to act as a symbol of the opposition when the time was right. When the time arrived to make Charles act, however, he refused, which effectively discontinued the coup.

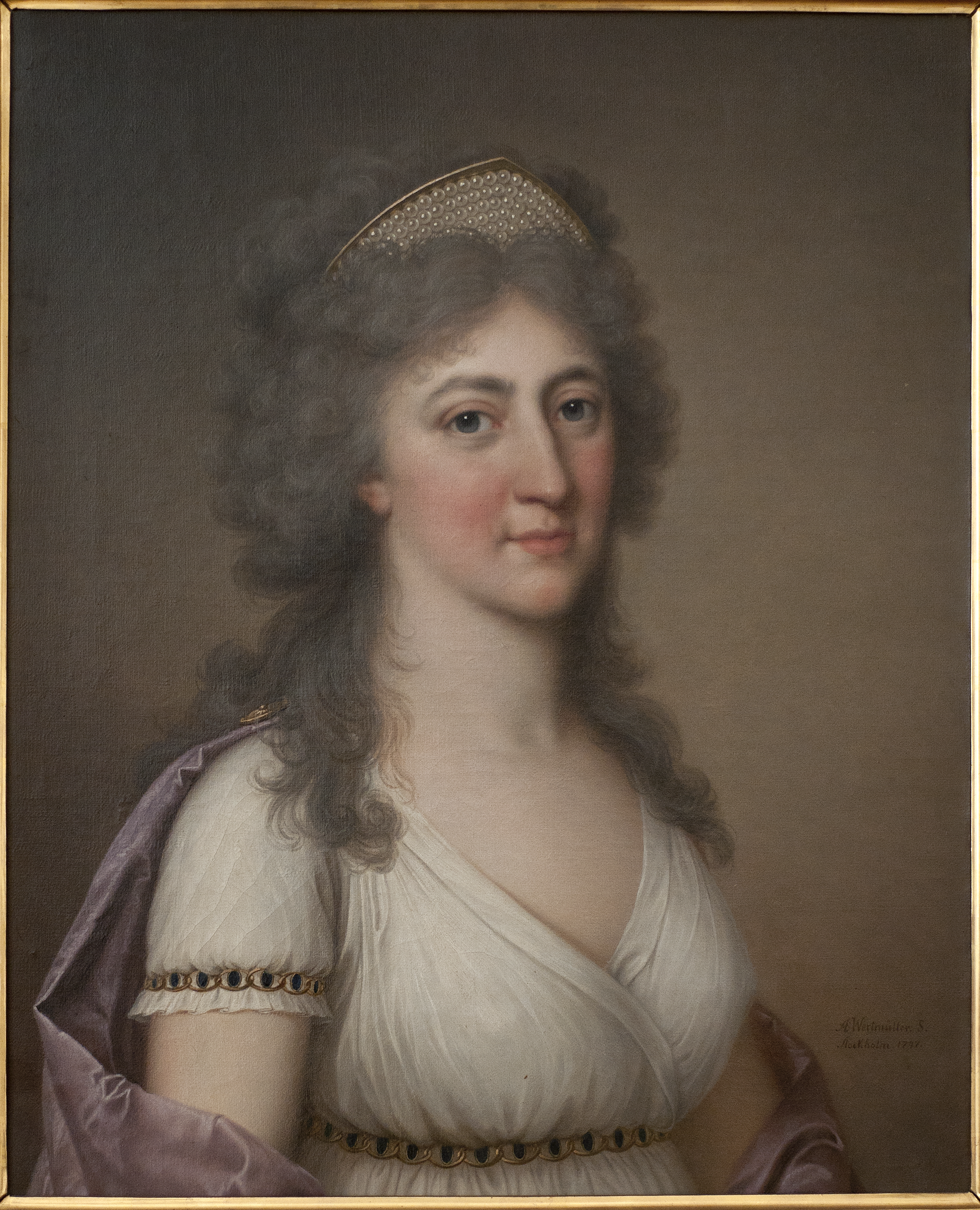
Hedvig Elisabeth Charlotte, by Adolf Ulrik Wertmüller 1797.

In 1792, her spouse became regent during the minority of his nephew Gustav IV Adolf. The actual power was in the hands of his favorite, Count Gustaf Adolf Reuterholm, and she had no influence upon the regency. In 1798–99, after the deaths of their two children, the spouses made a lenghty trip to Germany and Austria and visited Carlsbad, Berlin, Vienna and Hamburg. In 1800, the ducal couple founded an amateur court theater, Dramatiska akademien, at court, but it was closed by the monarch.

On 2 May 1776, at the Stockholm Palace, Hedvig Elisabeth Charlotte was initiated into the Freemasonry by the Grand Master of the Swedish Freemasons, her own consort Duke Charles. She was made Grand Mistress of Le véritable et constante amitié, a female Lodge of Adoption under the regular Swedish Masonic order, which used the same localities as the male order at the Stockholm Palace. The constitution of the Lodge was confirmed by Louis Philippe II, Duke of Orléans and Bathilde d'Orléans, Grand Master and Grand Mistress of the French male and female Freemasons, on 8 May 1776. Known members of this female lodge were Countesses Sophie and Hedvig Eleonora von Fersen, Countess Ulrica Catharina Koskull and, likely, Countess Charlotte Gyldenstolpe. Not much is known about this lodge. However, Duke Charles gave Hedvig Elisabeth Charlotte access to the first three grades of the regular male Freemasonic order. According to Karl Adolf Boheman, the reason was that she asked Charles to allow the female freemasons to participate in the male order. He did not agree, but he did give her access to the first three grades of the male Freemasons and the books of rituals, so that she could be able to explain the Masonic rituals for the female freemasons better. A written statement is preserved where she explains the male freemasons first three grades and states that though females could not be regular members because of the warlike ideals of the orders, they are no reasons to why the remaining mysteries should be kept from females. There is no date on this statement. The mystic Karl Adolf Boheman was presented to the Ducal couple by Count Magnus Stenbock in 1793. In 1802, he founded the co-freemasonic adoption lodge Yellow Rose with the Ducal couple as leading members. Both male and female members were initiated in this lodge, one of them being the mother of the queen. When Boheman attempted to initiate King Gustav IV Adolf in 1803, he refused, warned by Gustaf Mauritz Armfelt that the lodge was in fact a society of the Illuminati conspiring against him. This led to the Boheman Affair, which caused a lasting rift between the King and the Ducal couple. Boheman was arrested and expelled, after Duke Charles had been forced by the King to exclude Boheman from the freemasons. The ducal couple were exposed to an informal investigation by the monarch, and the duchess was questioned in the presence of the royal council.

== Life as Queen ==
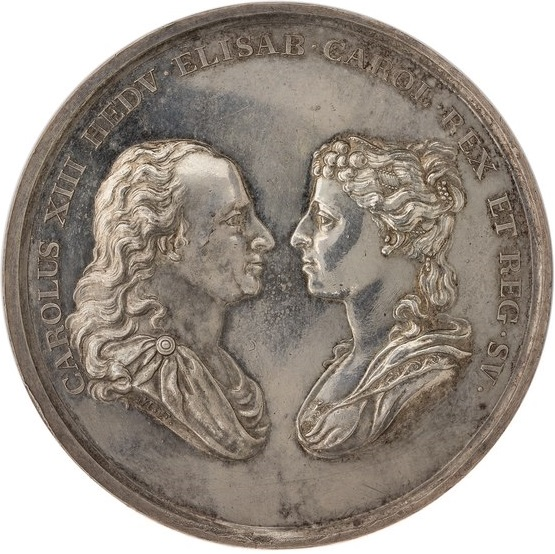
Coronation medal for queen Charlotte and king Charles in 1809.

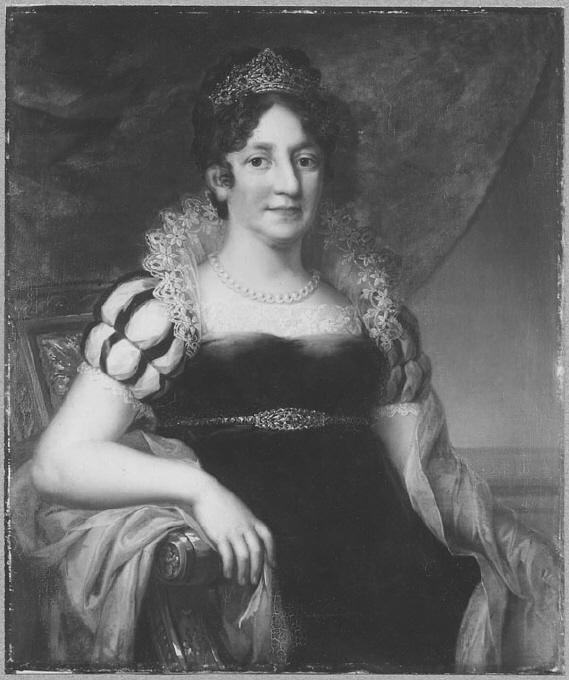
Queen Charlotte of Sweden and Norway, portrait by Fredric Westin, 1816.

In 1809, the ducal couple was placed upon the throne after the Coup of 1809. During the coup, she was heard by Charles de Suremain exclaiming: "I do not wish to be a Queen!", and she was later to say that she found it embarrassing to take the place of another.

When her spouse was informed that he was King, she told him that she would become his reliable adviser and confidante, but keep away from the matters of the state. During his reign, she is known to have visited him in his bedroom every morning to talk to him. She was crowned with the King 29 June 1809. At the coronation, she was described as gracious and dignified without losing her usual vividness and cheerfulness.

Despite her personal denial, the queen was believed by her contemporaries to exercise great political influence. Queen Hedvig Elizabeth Charlotte held a salon, the so-called "Green table" (the colour of the tablecloth), where women discussed politics while sewing.

She felt sympathy for the former queen, Frederica of Baden, and visited her in her house arrest. She worked for the release of the former royal family. It was due to her effort that the former king was allowed to reunite with his wife and children, who had initially been placed in separate house arrest.

During the negotiations regarding the succession to the throne, she supported the Gustavian Party, who wished for the deposed King's son, the former Crown Prince Gustav, to be acknowledged as heir to the throne. During a dinner, General Baron Georg Adlersparre told her that Jean Baptiste Bernadotte had asked him whether her spouse (Charles XIII) had any issue, and was interested when he found that he had not. When she remarked that the throne had an heir in the deposed King's son, Adlersparre stated that none of the instigators of the coup would accept this, as they feared that the boy would avenge his father when he became King, and that to prevent this they would go as far as to take up the old rumor that the deposed King was in fact the illegitimate son of Queen Sophia Magdalena and Count Adolf Fredrik Munck af Fulkila.

The other candidates for the post of heir to the throne were the French General Jean Baptiste Bernadotte, Prince Peter of Holstein-Gottorp, and the Danish Prince Charles August of Augustenburg. She was skeptical in all cases for the sake of Swedish independence, as she feared that Sweden would become a part of the French Empire under Bernadotte, or the Russian Empire (as Peter of Holstein was married to Grand-Duchess of Russia Catherine Pavlovna), or an appendage to Denmark. During a meeting in the garden with general Adlersparre, she stated: "I am very happy to be Swedish and I would not wish to be either French, Russian or Danish." Prince Charles August was eventually chosen. He was expected to bring Norway to Sweden as a replacement for Finland, which had been ceded to the Russian Empire in the Treaty of Fredrikshamn in 1809 and became established as the autonomous Grand Duchy of Finland.

It is unknown whether she had any influence upon the constitutional reform of 1809, though she is known to have discussed it with several statesmen. She stated that she disliked party divisions but also absolute monarchy, and wished for the public to decide about the matters concerning them through "elected representatives". Before the arrival of Prince Charles August, the King suffered a stroke and became unable to reign, whereupon she informally presided over the council in his place. The Gustavian party asked her to accept the post of regent, exclude the newly appointed Prince Charles August and adopt the former Crown Prince Gustav as heir.

There was a fear of a coup by her and the Gustavians. General, Baron Georg Adlersparre, who arrived after having prepared the arrival of Prince Charles August, met her outside the bedroom of the King. Adlersparre asked:

-"Perhaps I do no longer dare to approach Your Majesty?"
-"Why is that?" "I fear that Your Majesty is angry with me?" She laughed and answered:
-"How can you make me such a question? Why are you here?" He replied that he came to receive the King's instructions regarding his heir and on the assignment of Augustenburg [Prince Charles August] to inquire the general view upon him. She asked him to tell Augustenburg not to hold prejudice toward any one. After having received the King's permission to bring Augustenburg to Sweden, he asked her of her opinion. She remarked that he had not yet arrived, nor given any direct reply whether he wished the throne. He answered:
- "Perhaps he will not come, and then Your Majesty can play the same role as that of the Empress of Russia", referring to Catherine the Great, who took the throne from her spouse. She replied:
-"I have never wished for power, I have not as she murdered my consort or any Prince Ivan, nor could I do such a thing. I do not wish to be spoken to in such a tone." Adlersparre replied:
-"Your Majesty is correct, it is most certainly no fortune to be a monarch."

She declined the offer to be regent, and the coup never took place. Statesman Carl Johan Adlercreutz stated that, if the King had died, the matter would have been different: "If King Charles XIII had died, before the peace with Denmark was made and Kristian August was still in Norway, Queen Charlotte, who eagerly supported the plans of the Gustavian Party, would have played a considerable part."

She viewed Danish Prince Charles August of Augustenburg as good-hearted but rough. He claimed to be willing to adopt former Crown Prince Gustav as heir. 41-year-old Prince Charles August, who was popular among the public, died unmarried in 1810. The anti-Gustavians planted the rumour that he had been murdered by the Gustavian party.

Pamphlets circulated in the capital claiming that the Crown Prince had been murdered by the Gustavians, and that the Queen deserved to be hanged. The Gustavian Count Axel von Fersen the Younger was lynched, suspected to be involved in the alleged murder. The mob then sought Fersen's sister, Countess Sophie Piper, who was the intimate friend of the Queen and was said to influence her. The mob was told that Piper was with the Queen at Haga Palace.

The Queen and her ladies-in-waiting were left without guards at Haga, and there was a fear that she would be attacked. She was advised not to come into town, and boats were sent to evacuate them, if the lynch mob were to march to Haga. She decided to leave for town without an escort. Her lady-in-waiting Countess Wilhelmina Taube asked her not to, upon which she answered: "You are a coward, Mina! You are afraid; I will go alone! I do not fear death. I can defy it, and I will die as Marie Antoinette. Let us leave!" The women persuaded her to stay, and when she asked them to leave, they asked to remain. In the end, nothing happened. Despite opposition, she supported a clearing of Sophie Piper's name, which was most unpopular.

The election of a new heir to the throne was held in Örebro. She supported the former Crown Prince Gustav first and Peter of Holstein second. It was decided that the Queen should be confined to Strömsholm Palace during the election because of the general belief that she would interfere. When Jean-Baptiste Bernadotte was elected, the government sent her Fredrik August Adelswärd as their representative to inform her. He said that he realized her disappointment, as Bernadotte was a non-royal, but asked her to pretend to be happy for the health of the monarch, who was afraid that she would displeased. She answered that she would be happy with any one who could bring stability: "Then it will be the right one, and he will find a loyal friend in me. If he is also gifted with talent and a good heart, then his lineage would mean nothing to me." She asked for permission to go to Örebro, and declared: "I do not meddle in politics, although everyone may say otherwise."

Bernadotte made a very good impression on her, and their relationship was a good one. At their first meeting, he said to her: "Madam, I understand more than well what feelings my arrival must bring you, but please remember, that the first King was a soldier, who benefited from success!" She replied: "Let us not speak of it now, you have earned your success, which is more worthy than to have been born to it." He asked her for advice and discussed the matters of state with her. He also assisted her in arranging a state funeral for Axel von Fersen. In 1811, she was asked by the council to convince the King to appoint Bernadotte regent and convince the latter to accept the post, which she did.

The Queen described Bernadotte's wife, Désirée Clary as good-hearted, generous and pleasant when she chose to be and not one to plot, but also as immature and a "spoiled child", who hated all demands and was unable to handle any form of representation.

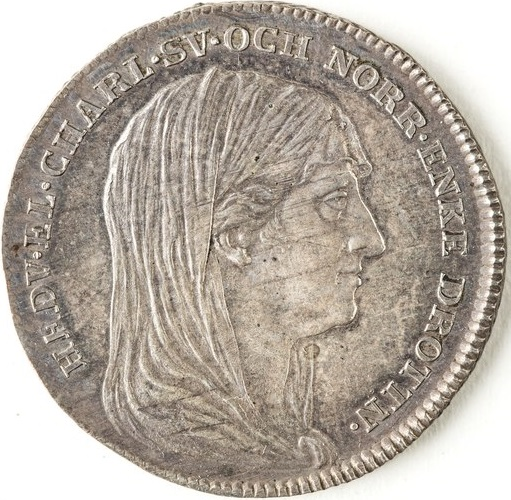
Charlotte's widowhood medal from 1818

She described Désirée as "a French woman in every inch", who disliked and complained about everything which was not French, and "consequently, she is not liked."

Bernadotte ordered the removal of everything reminding the Swedish people of the deposed royal family. Her Gustavian views made the anti-Gustavians direct the suspicions of Bernadotte to her, and she was obliged to stop her correspondence with the former Queen Frederica (1813), but her relationship with Bernadotte remained good. She supported his plan to conquer Norway, and became Queen of Norway in 1814. In 1816–1817, governor Baron Olof Rudolf Cederström attempted to implicate her in an alleged poison attempt against the life of the Crown Prince and his son. She had him questioned for slander, but this led to a break in the relationship with the Crown Prince, though it deepened her relation to Prince Oscar, who took her side in the affair.

Upon the death of her spouse, she reportedly said that she would not be able to survive him. After her husband's funeral, a great conflict of some sort is reported to have taken place between the Dowager Queen and the new King. After a private dinner with the King in June 1818, she withdrew to her room to write, and the very same night, she collapsed and died at the age of 59.

For a long time she had suffered from occasional severe stomach pains. On June 19, she had dinner at Charles John's in Rosendal Palace and late at night she suffered from severe stomach cramps and died within a few hours.

The last thing a chambermaid saw her do was sort letters and those she didn't want to preserve for posterity she threw into the fireplace.

== Legacy ==
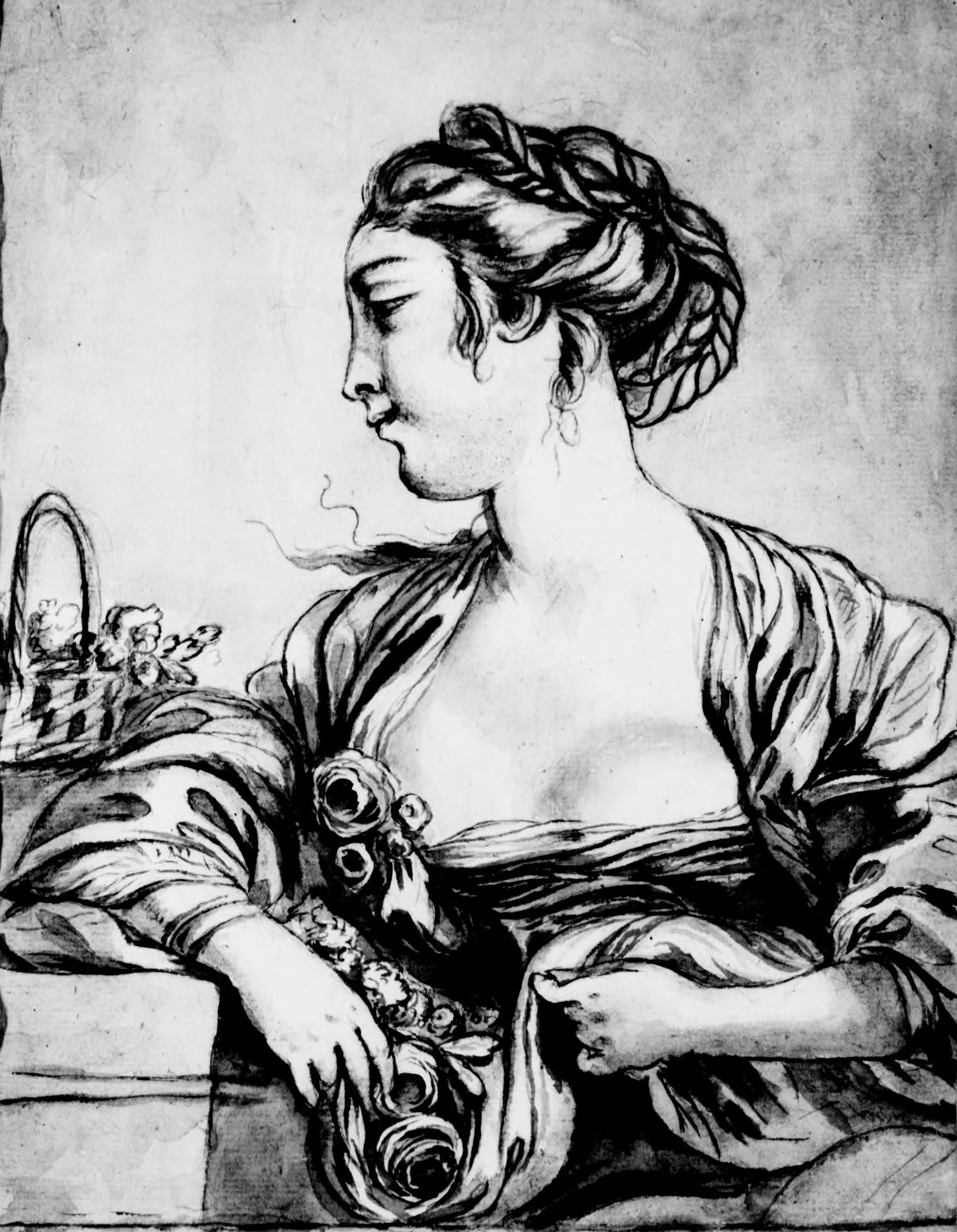
Hedvig Elisabeth Charlotte of Holstein-Gottorp's drawing of a young woman, taken from the sketchbook that was part of her diaries.

Hedvig Elizabeth Charlotte's depiction of Axel von Fersen's murder in 1810. "Fersenska mordet : skrildrat af drottning Hedvig Elisabeth Charlotta i hennes dagboksanteckningar för år 1810 och 1811 / utg. af Carl C:son Bonde." Stockholm

Hedwig Elizabeth Charlotte is known for her famous diary, which is a historical source that describes the Swedish Royal Court between August 1775 and October 1817.

When she in October 1817 finished her work, she wrote down the following telling note at the bottom of the last page:

»Comme mon intention est de faire serner [? = cerner] ces papiers par quelqu'un en qui j'ai confiance pour ne point les garder chez moi, au cas de mort hative peut être que mes annotations ceront fini ici, sinom que je vive et puisse continuer chaque anné je serrerait mes écrit ou je les detrurais ou ferait detruire au cas d'une mort hative» "As my intention is to have these papers sealed by someone I trust so as not to keep them at home, in the event of an early death perhaps my notes will end here; otherwise, if I live and can continue each year, I will seal my writings or destroy them or have them destroyed in the event of an early death."

The massive diary was written in French and initially (until March 1798) in the form of letters to her close friend, Countess Sophie von Fersen, sister of Axel von Fersen. The letters were never sent, but written in this form as a tribute to Sophie von Fersen. The diaries were written with the intent to be published, as stipulated by the Queen, fifty years after her death.

It was translated to the Swedish language and published in nine parts between 1902 and 1942: the first three parts translated by Carl Carlsson Bonde, the remaining parts by Cecilia af Klercker.

The diary of Hedvig Elizabeth Charlotte is sometimes used as a valuable source of reference within Swedish historical research. It describes events both nationally and internationally, treats various subjects such as gossip, plots and social events taking place within the Swedish royal court and aristocracy as well as political subjects, and provides personal character portraits of contemporaries. It describes events such as the French Revolution of 1789, the Regicide of Gustav III in 1792, the Napoleonic Wars and the deposition of Gustav IV Adolf in 1809. The collection of Hedvig Elizabeth Charlotte also includes her correspondence as well various other documents, some of which are quoted in the diary, published in Swedish.

Her diary has also been considered partially unreliable in its obvious personal bias on the part of the duchess against her brother-in-law King Gustav III.

== In fiction ==
Hedvig Elisabeth Charlotte of Holstein-Gottorp, alongside the fictitious Johanna and Sophie von Fersen, is one of the three main characters in the novel trilogy Barnbruden (Child Bride) from 2013, Pottungen (Chamber pot child) from 2014, and Räfvhonan (She Fox) from 2015, by Anna Laestadius Larsson.

Queen Charlotte appears as a character in Annemarie Selinko's 1951 novel Désirée set up as the diary of Désirée Clary, whose husband succeeded Charlotte's husband as king. It gives the queen as a small-minded, propriety-obsessed martinet, and blames Charlotte for her decision to leave her husband and return to Paris.

== Children ==
1. Lovisa Hedvig (Stockholm, 2 July 1797). Stillborn; buried at Riddarholm Church.
2. Carl Adolf, Duke of Värmland (Stockholm, 4 July 1798 – Stockholm, 10 July 1798). Lived six days; buried at Riddarholm Church.

== Arms ==
Coat of Arms of Queen Charlotte

Hedvig Elisabeth Charlotte of Holstein-Gottorp House of Holstein-Gottorp Cadet branch of the House of Oldenburg Born: 22 March 1759 Died: 20 June 1818
Royal titles
Preceded by Frederica of Baden	Queen consort of Sweden; 1809–1818	Succeeded by Désirée Clary
Vacant Title last held by Marie Sophie of Hesse-Kassel	Queen consort of Norway; 1814–1818	Succeeded by Désirée Clary
