= Gustaf Adolf Reuterholm =

Swedish statesman

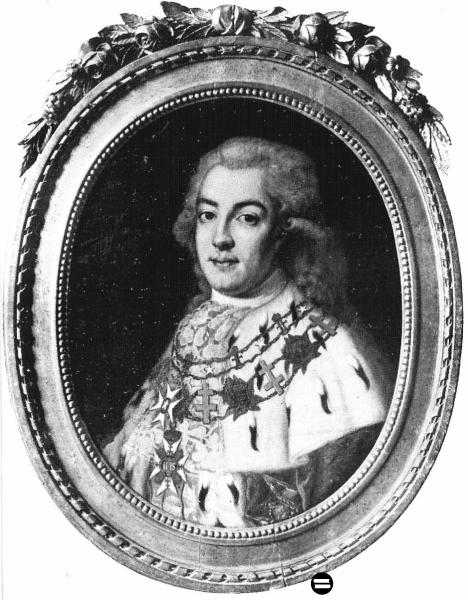
Gustaf Adolf Reuterholm

Baron Gustaf Adolf Reuterholm (7 July 1756 in Sjundeå, Nyland, Sweden (now Finland) – 27 December 1813 in Schleswig), was a Swedish statesman. He acted as the de facto regent of Sweden during the minor regency of Gustav IV Adolf of Sweden between 1792 and 1796.

== Early career ==
After a brief military career he was appointed Kammarherre to Sophia Magdalena, queen consort of Gustav III of Sweden and subsequently became intimately connected with the king's brother, Charles, then duke of Södermanland. He remained in the background throughout the reign of Gustavus III, whom he constantly opposed, particularly through the clandestine Walhalla-orden which he co-founded in Sveaborg.

He was implicated in the 1789 Conspiracy. In the autumn of 1789, princess Hedvig Elisabeth Charlotte prepared to depose Gustav III and place her husband Duke Charles upon the throne. Her ideal was the Swedish Constitution of 1772, which she saw as a good tool for an enlightened aristocracy, and the war and the Union and Security Act had made her a leading part of the opposition. She cooperated with Prince Frederick Adolf, Duke of Östergötland, and Gustaf Adolf Reuterholm. The plan was to force Charles to act as a symbol of the opposition to the Union and Security Act when the time was right. When the time arrived to make Charles act, however, he refused, which effectively discontinued the coup.

He, along with the other malcontents, was imprisoned by Gustav III in 1789.

== Ruler of Sweden ==
He was abroad at the time of the king's death, but a summons from his friend, now duke regent, speedily recalled him, and in 1793 he was made a member of the Privy Council and one of the "lords of the realm". At first he seemed inclined to adopt a liberal system, and reintroduced the freedom of the press. He did this solely, however, to reverse the Gustavian system, and persecuted the stalwarts of the late king (e.g. Armfelt, and Toll) with a petty vindictiveness which excited general disgust. In 1794 the discovery of the Armfelt Conspiracy exposed the opposition of the Gustavian Party.

Towards the end of the regency, Reuterholm inclined towards an alliance with Russia on the basis of a marriage between the young king, Gustav IV of Sweden, and the empress Catherine II's granddaughter, Alexandra Pavlovna, an alliance frustrated by the bigotry of the intended groom. At home the Swedish government ended as ultra-reactionary, owing to an insignificant riot in Stockholm which so alarmed Reuterholm that he threatened all printers who printed anything relating to the constitutions of the French Republic or the United States of America with the loss of their privileges. In March 1795 he closed the Swedish Academy because A. G. Silfverstolpe in his inaugural address had ventured to disapprove of the coup d'état of 1789.

In 1796 he was elected a member of the Royal Swedish Academy of Sciences.

== Expulsion ==
On the accession of Gustav IV of Sweden on 1 November 1796 Reuterholm was expelled from Stockholm. For the next twelve years he lived abroad under the name of Tempelcreutz. After the revolution of 1809 he returned to Sweden, but was denied all access to Charles XIII, and quit his country for good. He died in Schleswig on 27 December 1813 and was buried in Strängnäs Cathedral in Sweden.
