= Charles de Suremain =

French military officer and diplomat (1762–1835)

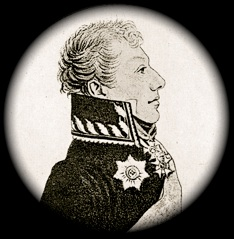
Charles de Suremain

Coat of arms of the de Suremain family

Charles Jean-Baptiste de Suremain (French pronunciation: [ʃaʁl(ə) d(ə) syʁmɛ̃]; 9 October 1762 – 24 September 1835) was a French military officer and diplomat in Swedish service during the French Revolutionary Wars and Napoleonic Wars.

== Life ==
De Suremain belonged to the French nobility and emigrated in 1792 to become a part of the Armée des Émigrés during the French Revolution.

In 1794, he came to be in service of the Swedish army and instructor of War science of Gustav IV Adolf of Sweden. He also became a favorite of the regent Duke Charles, devoted himself to court service and participated in the contacts between the duke and the Swiss adventurer and Russian spy Christin in 1796.

He served in the Finnish War, was made adjutant general of Charles XIII and sent to emperor Napoleon I of France to inform him of the Coup of 1809 and negotiate peace for Sweden. He continued to serve in the Swedish army under Jean-Baptiste Bernadotte, took leave during the war against France in 1814 but did participate in the war against Norway. His relationship to Bernadotte was not good, and when he was given a position in Pomerania in 1815, he regarded himself exiled and resigned from Swedish service. He returned to France and settled down as a landowner in Bourgogne.

== Memoirs ==
His memoirs Mémoires du lieutenant-général de Suremain was published in 1902, describing Sweden from his own diary and notes between 1794 and 1815 and regarded to be impartial, humble and exact, though his personal emotional attachment of Charles XIII is evident in it.
