= Valhallaorden =

18th century secret society in Finland

Walhalla-orden was a secret society founded in the early part of 1783 in the Sveaborg (today, in Finnish: Suomenlinna) fortress outside Helsinki, Finland by Johan Anders Jägerhorn along with Gustaf Adolf Reuterholm. It is thought to have been instrumental in setting in motion forces that eventually caused Finnish independence.

== Origins ==
Valhallaorden began as an offshoot of an obscure Swedish quasi-masonic secret society called La Constance, created to bolster loyalty to the Swedish Constitution of 1772. However, the Swedish counterpart withered quickly, while the Valhalla society took root in the Sveaborg fortress. In addition to the originating lodge in Sweden, they had a lodge known as The Cabin of the Holy Axel based in Turku.

== Historical context ==
Walhalla-orden was not unique to its period in Sveaborg; quite the contrary, besides a masonic lodge and Walhalla-orden, there were a number of similar societies including a British-inspired secret society of kirvesmiehet called Saint Charles' Cabin and another unconnected society called Brothers of February the Seventeenth. On the frivolous side, there was also a secret society called the Hypotenuse Society, which was primarily oriented around marathon drinking. Every shot of punch was registered as a working in the meeting minutes.

== Name ==
The Walhalla-orden originally was preceded by a lodge taking the name of an early ancestor of Jägerhorn, namely Rutger Ingesson, who according to legends inspired by the Song of Roland was a crusader knight in the troops of Erik the Holy. In fact there was a brief time during which St. Erik's lodge was the Finnish locus of activities.

== Symbology ==
The Walhalla-orden drew its symbology from Gothic revivalist notions of ancient Scandinavian roots, and the lodges for instance were called by a more archaic Scandinavian name. Even though the initiation ceremonies centered on a five-part play expressing the history of the creation of the Swedish nation in allegorical fashion, the symbolic organizational structure was entirely Finnish without reference to Swedish counties or emblems.

== Development ==
The society began on a strict loyalist foundation and stayed nominally in support of the constitution, but after a short time its membership became primarily composed of officers stationed there who had a grievance with Gustav III. The members were bound by oath to keep their conversations frank and confidential, and took that obligation seriously. Therefore, it is almost certain that many seditious matters were broached, in one form or another. This assumption is supported by the fact that nearly all of the people implicated in the Anjala conspiracy, including its leadership, were members of it.

== Activities ==
Though only few fragments of encrypted correspondence remain, and the archives were burned to protect the members later implicated in what the crown considered to be nefarious plots, such as the Anjala conspiracy, it is thought that the meetings of the Walhalla-orden may have been the first discussions in which Finnish independence was proposed as a serious idea. Indeed, in the society, people floated the idea of Finland becoming a protectorate of Russia.

== See also ==
- Secret society
