= Anjala League =

Scheme by disgruntled Swedish officers to end Gustav III's Russian War of 1788–90

Coordinates: 60°41′47″N 26°48′50″E

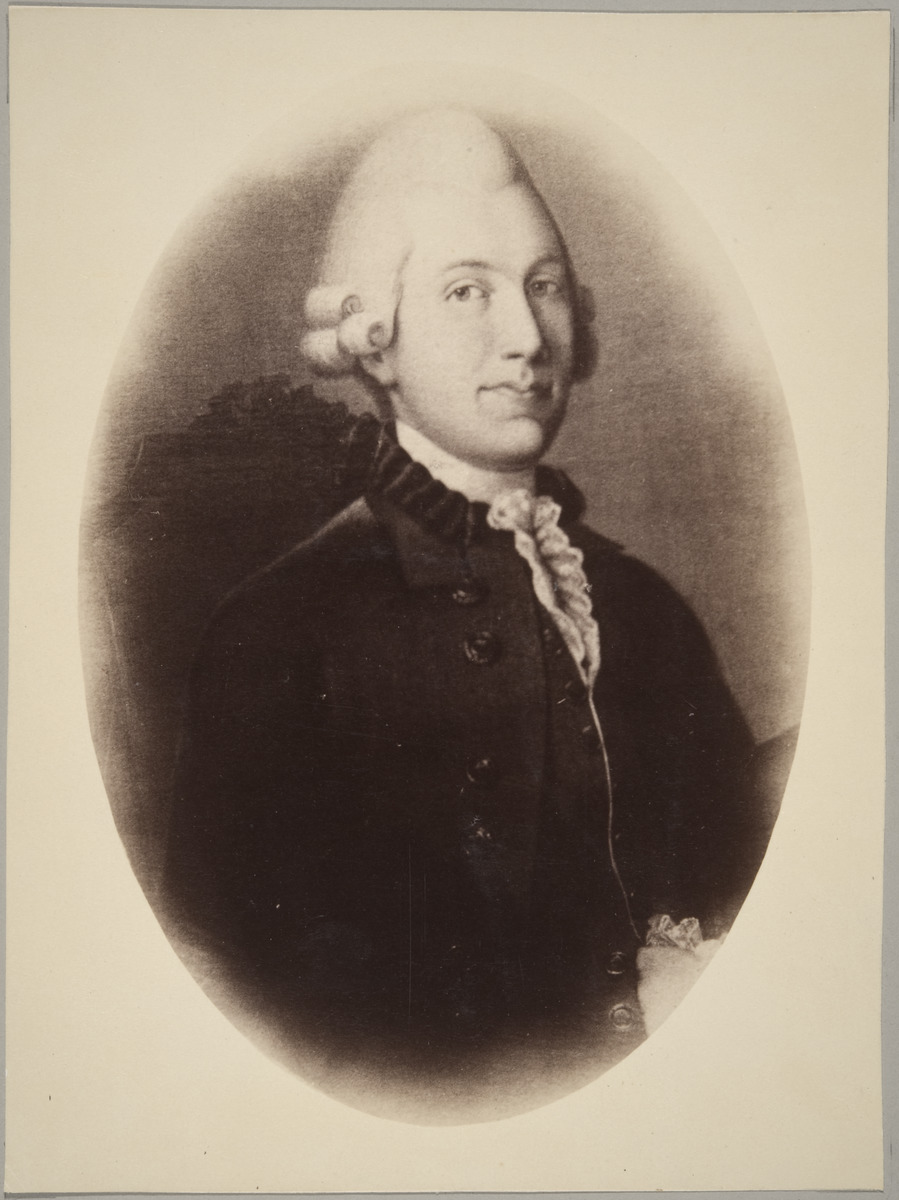
Colonel Johan Henrik Hästesko (1741–1790) was a Finnish soldier and an officer of the Swedish Army. He took part in the conspiracy and was executed for that. He was the only one to suffer such fate.

The Anjala League (Swedish: Anjalaförbundet, Finnish: Anjalan liitto) (Note: Also known as Anjala Covenant or Anjala Conspiracy) of 1788 was a scheme by disgruntled Swedish officers to end Gustav III's Russian War of 1788–1790. Declaring Finland an independent state was not a part of the original plot, but one of the conspirators Johan Anders Jägerhorn, who handed the note to Empress Catherine the Great, made such claims in Saint Petersburg.

== Rising anger against the king and his war ==
As the war was badly prepared and without the expected initial success, anger rose against the king within the military ranks deployed to Finland, where the memory of the harsh Russian occupations of 1713–21 (the "Greater Wrath") (Isoviha in Finnish) and 1741–43 (the "Lesser Wrath") (Pikkuviha in Finnish) remained vivid. The war was clearly initiated by Sweden, and in the view of a strong opinion, particularly among noble officers, a clear violation of the authoritarian Instrument of Government that the king, with support of the common estates of the parliament, had imposed in 1772.

It was no secret that the war was conceived to increase the king's popularity and influence, and diminish that of his, mostly noble, opponents. The anger was fueled also by Cabinet members who felt duped to support the war plans by the king's selective quoting of diplomatic reports from Saint Petersburg. The failed attempts to besiege and recapture Hamina and Savonlinna, both of which had been in Russian hands since 1743, ultimately ignited a vehement opposition among the officers, and it was said that even the king wished for peace.

== The Liikkala Note ==
The leaders of the Anjala conspiracy met on August 9, 1788 in Liikkala under the leadership of Swedish Major general Carl Gustaf Armfelt the Younger, together they wrote a diplomatic note to Tsarina Catherine the Great of Russia. This so-called Liikkala note stated that they were dissatisfied with the war, and that it was not in the interest of Sweden to be at war with Russia. The reason for the note was to scout the possibility of peace. They also offered Russia peace on the basis of the national borders prior to the Treaty of Åbo. This would have resulted in Russia ceding parts of Karelia to Sweden.

The note was signed by Carl Gustaf Armfeldt, Johan Anders Jägerhorn, Johan Henrik Hästesko and five more officers. It was decided that Jägerhorn should take the note to Russia, and so he left the campaign and went to Saint Petersburg.

=== In Russia ===
Jägerhorn arrived in Saint Petersburg around August 12 and was granted an audience with Catherine the Great on August 15, and he delivered the note. He however added orally that there was a great desire in Finland to secede from Sweden and put itself under the protection of Russia. Catherine however did not give him any answers.

A few days later Catherine's answer came in writing, she reportedly appreciated the Finnish nation’s way of thinking, but it would require the presence of more people under a formal and legally representative form. Verbally it was added that Russia thought it inappropriate to give back any provinces it had gained in war.

Jägerhorn left St. Petersburg on August 20, and arrived back at the army on August 23. The army was at this time in Anjala. The conspirators were downcast by Russia's reply, and several also saw Jägerhorn’s venture of detaching Finland from Sweden as treason.

== The Anjala Act ==
At the same time as Jägerhorn arrived in Petersburg the so-called Anjala Act was declared and printed. It was written at the Anjala manor by the Kymi river. The Act which corresponded to the Liikkala note was signed by 113 officers, and it stated:

- §1. Peace shall be treated with Russia
- §2. The Riksdag of the Estates was to be convened
- §3. The Instrument of Government must be followed
- §4. An armistice was to be sought, because otherwise the Swedish and Finnish coast would be burned by the Russian navy.
- §5. The Army was to withdraw from the front.
- §6. The signers of the Act was for the realm willing to sacrifice all, including their own blood, and they had no desire to start a revolution.

In an addendum that was sent to the army, the conspirators talked at some length what they were after. The Riksdag was to be called, but it was also to include all officers. Certain changes should be made in the government, the kings Appanage was to be fixed and could not be overrun, and that the Privy Council of Sweden was to be set up according to the 1720 Instrument of Government. They also stated that the Riksdag should be called after a fixed number of years and that the Freedom of the press act of 1766 should be followed. Further they demanded that the Police Bureau in Stockholm under Nils Henric Liljensparre should be closed.

From this one can draw the conclusion that there was a critique of Royal power, and that the conspirators wanted to revert to the form of government that had existed under Sweden's Age of Liberty. On August 25 an additional document was spread, the avertissement which called for the King's abdication.

The opinion was however shifting, Jägerhorn’s actions in St. Petersburg and his actions of splitting Sweden and Finland was seen as treason, and this made the conspiracy falter.

== Results ==
Gustav III who was present with the army in Finland was unsure how to proceed, but to the King's amazement, Denmark declared war on Sweden. This new theatre of war against Denmark in the South gave the king a good excuse to leave Finland and return to Stockholm, without it looking as a retreat. He gathered support, foremost among the burghers and the peasants, both of whom despised the officers from the nobility. During the fall of 1788, the king ordered the arrest of the conspirators, and with popular support he called for the Riksdag of 1789, in which he with popular support could increase his own power by the Union and Security Act.

Two of the conspirators ended up as refugees in Russia, nine were sentenced to death, although only one, Johan Henrik Hästesko, was executed, while the rest were either deported or put in prison.

The idea of a separate Finnish nation was subsequently echoed by Alexander I at the Diet of Porvoo, when he formed the autonomous Grand Duchy of Finland from the eastern part of Sweden as a part of Imperial Russia.

== Long-term effects ==
It may be argued, that king Gustav used the Anjala conspiracy to win support for a revision of the Swedish Constitution in order to strengthen his own position and weaken the influence of his opponents. But it may also be argued that this was what he had aimed at with the war itself; and that even after the unsuccessful attack on Russia he might indeed have been fully capable of achieving this, even without the boost in public opinion the Anjala conspiracy offered. A conclusion might be that the conspiracy maybe is more significant as an indicator of the situation in Sweden of the late 18th century, than as an actual agent in history.

The military officers, who had supported the events with the best of intentions for their country, became further alienated by the condemnations from government and that of the prevailing public opinion. Hence it can be argued that the split between the state leadership and the leading nobles (civil servants and officers), in particular in Finland, was further aggravated due to the reaction to the Anjala affair, particularly if the government's reaction for exactly that reason was intentionally lenient. This increased the willingness of leading Swedes in Finland to switch their allegiance from Stockholm to Saint Petersburg, and thus contributed to the subsequent split of Sweden in 1808/09.

The common estates', and the public opinion's, critical assessment of the Anjala-men were in many circles in Finland seen as yet another sign of a rift between the two parts of Sweden. It seemed as if the Age of Liberty had elevated people with a very narrow view of the world, a view that obviously did not reach to the realm's eastern periphery. In other words, which would be echoed also in connection with Finland's 20th-century wars, it seemed as if the majority of the Swedes did no longer consider the Finns' interests, nor appreciate the importance of the eastern provinces for Sweden, nor the sacrifices of the Finns.

However, it ought not be neglected, that the conspiracy also further emboldened the Russians, who for all of the century had successfully strived for influence over Sweden's domestic and foreign politics, and now saw the increasing possibility to acquire all of Sweden's eastern provinces, which would mean a substantial improvement of the strategic position of the new Russian capital, Saint Petersburg, at the Gulf of Finland.

== Historical views differ in Finland and Sweden ==
The evaluation of the Anjala conspiracy offers somewhat differing views between Sweden and Finland.

In Finland, it is often seen as an important phase of nation-building, and the separatist aspect may well be somewhat inflated, putting the conspirators' primary aim of striving for peace and restoration of political liberties in the background.

In Sweden, the conspiracy is typically either seen as an understandable opposition against an oppressive king, who was actually eventually assassinated in 1792, and whose son, Gustav IV Adolf, would be deposed in 1809, or alternatively as an omen of how treacherous Swedish civil servants in 1808/09 would facilitate Russia's acquisition of what became Finland.

== See also ==
- Walhalla-orden
- 1789 Conspiracy (Sweden)
- Independence of Finland
