= Instrument of Government (1809) =

One of the Four Basic Laws of the Swedish constitution

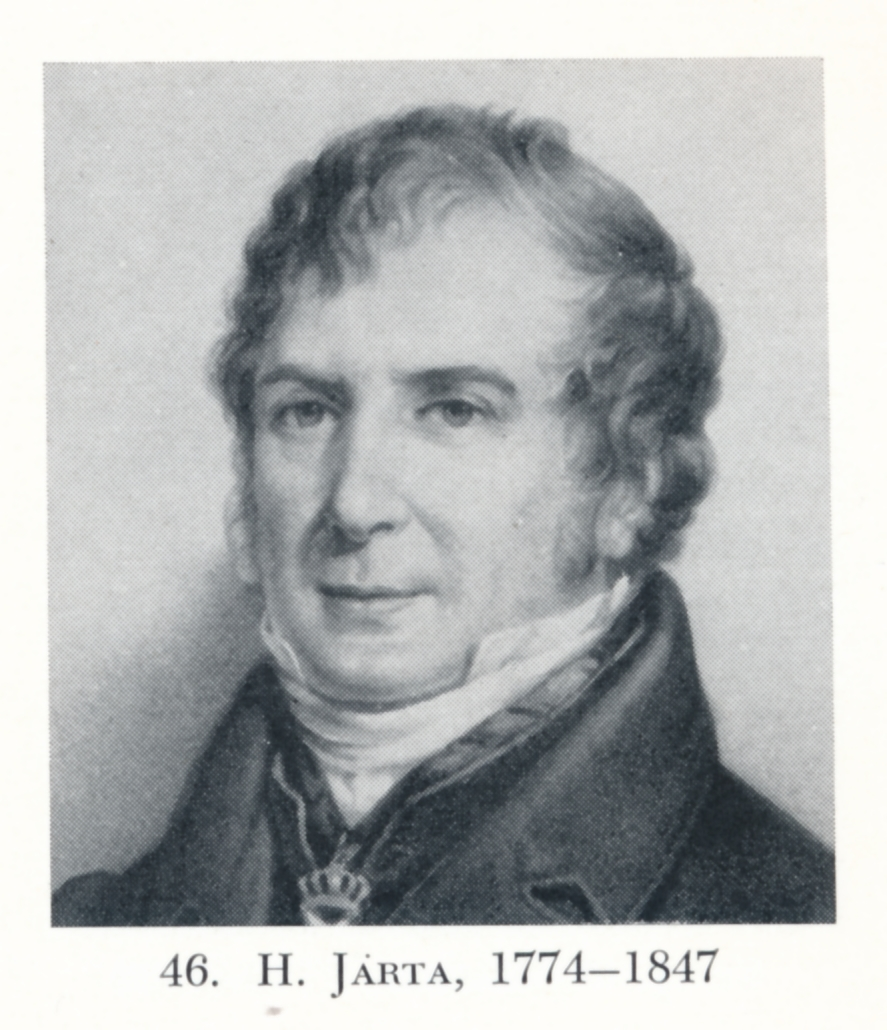
Hans Järta, the principal author of the Instrument of Government.

The 1809 Instrument of Government (Swedish: 1809 års regeringsform), adopted on 6 June 1809 by the Riksdag of the Estates and King Charles XIII, was the constitution of the Kingdom of Sweden from 1809 to the end of 1974. It came about as a result of the Coup of 1809, in which King Gustav IV Adolf was deposed. The promulgation of the constitution marks the point at which Sweden transitioned from the absolute monarchy of the Gustavian era (established by a previous coup in 1772) into a stable, constitutional monarchy adhering to the rule of law and significant civil liberties, specifically through its 16th paragraph.

Initially the Instrument only curtailed the powers of the king, who retained a significant executive (and some legislative) powers and a central role in politics, but over time this role was reduced still further by convention as Sweden developed into a full democracy around 1917-1920. After this point, executive power was exercised through the cabinet, which was responsible to parliament, and separation of powers effectively replaced by parliamentarianism. In practice, this trend had been established since the replacing of the Riksdag of the Estates with a bicameral legislature (based on the United States Congress) in 1866.

The 1809 Instrument, with its significant revisions and conventions was finally replaced by the Instrument of Government of 1974, which formally enshrined representative democracy and popular sovereignty, exercised through a unicameral parliament. It remains, however, the longest lasting constitutional framework in Swedish history.

== History ==
After the promulgation of the Instrument of Government (1719), Sweden had a half-century of parliamentary government under the Riksdag of the Estates, a period traditionally known as the Age of Liberty. This came to an end with the Revolution of 1772, a self-coup perpetrated by Gustav III, who subsequently ruled as an enlightened despot under the 1772 Instrument of Government. Gustav III's son, Gustav IV Adolf, succeeded him but proved a less charismatic ruler, and his political authority was fatally undermined by Swedish defeat in the Finnish War, part of the broader Napoleonic Wars, which led to the cession of Finland to Russia under the Treaty of Fredrikshamn.

This military catastrophe provided an opportunity for disaffected liberals, backed by elements of the Swedish Army, to mount a coup against the unpopular king. Gustav Adolf was arrested, forced to abdicate and then sent into exile, and his uncle Duke Charles was acclaimed as King Charles XIII. Charles agreed to renounce absolute monarchy, and to accept the replacement of the absolutist Instrument of Government (1772) by a new constitution. The new constitution was drawn up by a committee led by Hans Järta, and was officially adopted by the Riksdag on 6 June, Sweden's national day.

In 1789, by the Union and Security Act (Swedish: förenings- och säkerhetsakten), an amendment charter to the constitution, the exclusive right of the nobility to high offices was abolished and the Estates of the Burghers and the Peasants also received these privileges - a step towards modern democracy. Aristocratic control of state organs ceased, and the Privy Council was abolished, although the councillors retained their titles for life. The council's judicial function devolved on the King's Supreme Court (Swedish: Konungens Högsta Domstol) composed of an equal number of noble and non-noble members. In the 1789 constitutional amendment Gustav III, having desired to abolish the constitutional power of the Council (a pesky limitation to royal rule of the executive branch, in his view), had instead received the right to determine the number of councillors. He decided to have zero of them, instead he created the office of Rikets allmänna ärendens beredning (Preparation of the general affairs of the kingdom) which was a predecessor to the Council of State.

As Charles XIII was childless, it was vital to find an heir in order to guarantee a smooth succession upon his death. The Riksdag initially elected a Danish prince and Stadtholder of Norway, Charles August, but he died soon afterwards. In 1810 they therefore held a second election and chose the French Marshal and Prince of Pontecorvo Jean-Baptiste Bernadotte, who was adopted by Charles XIII and officially recognised as heir apparent. In order to prevent future succession crises, the rights of Bernadotte's descendants to accede to the Swedish throne were codified in an amendment to the Instrument of Government, the Act of Succession (1810).

== Description ==
The Instrument of Government established a separation of powers between the executive branch (the king) and the legislative branch (the Riksdag of the Estates). The King and Riksdag possessed joint power over legislation (article 87, constitutional law in articles 81-86), while the Riksdag had sole power over the budget and state incomes and expenses (articles 57-77) including military burdens (article 73). While the king's power was somewhat reduced compared to the enlightened absolutism of Gustav III, the new document did allow the king to take a more active role in politics than the 1720 Instrument of Government which had been in force during the Age of Liberty.

Originally, ministers were politically responsible solely to the king, who appointed and dismissed them. However, they were legally responsible to the Riksdag and a special court (Riksrätten) according to a special statute and to law in general if they committed legal offences (articles 106 and 101-102).

=== General Affairs Committee ===
The General Affairs Committee was the highest decision-making body in Sweden after the king from 1789 to 1809. The committee was formed on 15 May 1789, when the Council of State was dissolved. This took place after the introduction of the Act of Association and Security after the Riksdag of 1789.

It was to handle all the matters previously examined by the Council of State, and fell under the areas of War, Civil, Trade and Finance, or Ecclesiastical Expeditions. It consisted of the state secretaries of the expeditions, the chancellor, and six additional council members. After the matter had been decided in the committee, which initially included the king, they were ratified as government decisions with the king's signature.

== Later Reforms ==
Although the Instrument of Government remained in force to the end of 1974, a large number of important reforms were made in the meantime which transformed the structures of Swedish government.

Under the Instrument, the Riksdag of the Estates initially retained the multicameral form it had had since the Middle Ages, comprising representatives of the four "estates" of Swedish society, namely the nobility, clergy, burghers and peasantry. However, in 1866 it was replaced by a new bicameral (two-chamber) legislature, the modern Riksdag, in which members of the "First Chamber" elected indirectly by the county councils and the municipal assemblies in the larger towns and cities, and members of the "Second Chamber" directly elected by male property owners.

A further important change came in 1876 with the creation of the office of Prime Minister of Sweden, reflecting practice in other parliamentary democracies such as the United Kingdom.

=== Courtyard Crisis ===
As the Riksdag's authority grew, it became increasingly difficult for a government to stay in office solely with the Crown's support. This tension grew especially bad after 1907, when a liberal government was chosen that enjoyed the confidence of the Riksdag but was disliked by King Gustav V. In 1914 the king made the so-called Courtyard Speech publicly criticising the government, which resigned in protest, whereupon the king appointed a conservative government of civil servants responsible to him.

The Liberals won a decisive victory in 1917, and although Gustaf nevertheless tried to appoint another conservative ministry, it could not garner enough support in the Riksdag. It was now obvious that the king could no longer pick a government by his discretion, nor could he keep an unpopular ministry in office against the will of the Riksdag. Gustaf yielded and appointed a liberal-social democratic coalition that effectively arrogated most of the crown's political powers to itself.

This "Courtyard Crisis" definitively established that ministers were both politically and legally responsible only to the Riksdag rather than the crown, and from then on, while ministers were still formally appointed by the king, convention required him to always ensure they had the support of a majority in the Riksdag. Although the 1809 Instrument's statement that "the King alone shall govern the realm" (article 4) remained unchanged, it was understood that he was to exercise his powers through the ministers and act on their advice. As a result, the ministers did most of the actual work of governing, making Sweden a de facto parliamentary monarchy.

== Replacement by the 1974 Instrument ==
On 1 January 1975, the 1809 Instrument was replaced by a new Instrument of Government (1974), which stripped the king of even nominal political power and made Sweden a de facto crowned republic. but in the terms of Constitutional Monarchy as the form of government in Sweden according to the Constitution.

== See also ==
- History of Sweden
- Politics of Sweden
- Constitution of Sweden
- King in Council (Sweden)
- Instrument of Government (1974)
