= Armfelt Conspiracy =

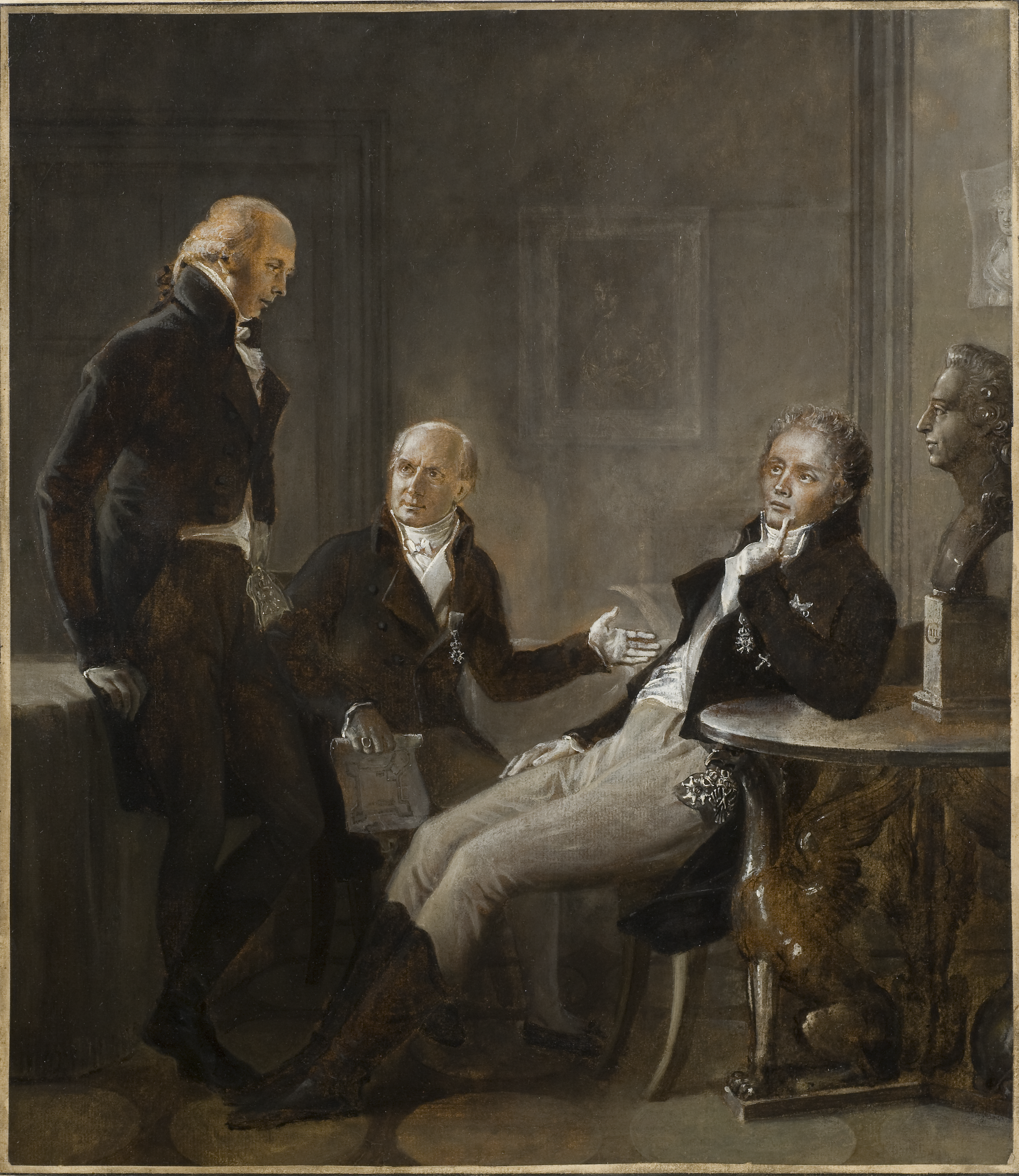
Three Gustavians. Johan Fredrik Aminoff, Johan Albrecht Ehrenström, and Gustaf Mauritz Armfelt by René Théodore Berthon in 1803.

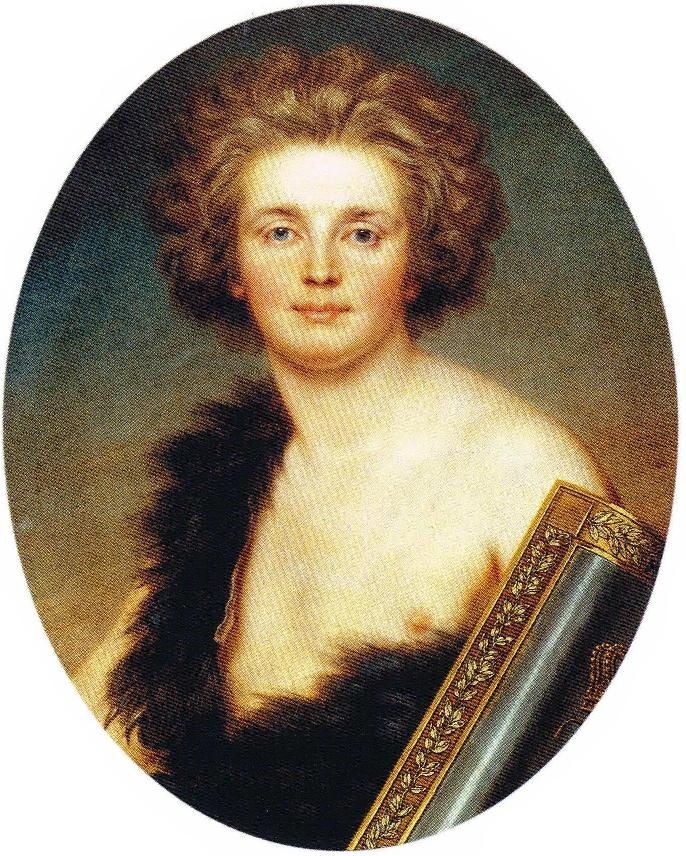
Gustaf Mauritz Armfelt by Wertmüller

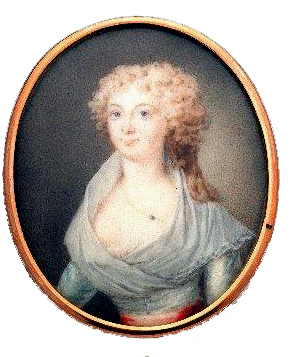
Magdalena Charlotta Rudenschöld

The Armfelt Conspiracy was a plot in Sweden in 1793. The purpose was to depose the de jure regent Duke Charles and the de facto regent Gustaf Adolf Reuterholm, leaders of the regency government of Gustav IV Adolf of Sweden, and replace them with Gustaf Mauritz Armfelt, the favorite of the king's father Gustav III of Sweden. The conspiracy was discovered and prevented in 1793.

== Background ==
King Gustav III had been assassinated in 1792 and his son, Gustav IV Adolf (born 1778) was too young to rule himself when he was made king. Gustav III's younger brother Duke Charles (who would become Charles XIII when he succeeded Gustav IV in 1809) was named regent, with the Privy Council to advise him. On his deathbed, King Gustav III had also committed the care of his son to Gustaf Mauritz Armfelt and appointed him a member of the Privy Council and Governor of Stockholm.

Soon after the murder of Gustav III, Gustaf Adolf Reuterholm was recalled from his exile by Duke Charles and made president of the Kammarrevisionen (a forerunner of the Administrative court of appeal). Reuterholm had been implicated in the failed 1789 Conspiracy to depose Gustav III and replace him with Charles, and in 1792 he became the de facto ruler of Sweden through his advice to Duke Charles. The "Gustavians" of the regency and the wider government, those still loyal to Gustav III and his policies, were systematically pushed to the side by Reuterholm.

Armfelt was removed from the position as Governor of Stockholm and Reuterholm had him named Swedish minister to Italian courts in 1792, which was a convenient way to remove him from the political action in Stockholm.

== The conspiracy ==
Armfelt was resentful of his de facto exile and was of the opinion that the conduct of the regency contravened the last will of Gustav III. From his residence in Naples he tried to engineer the fall of Reuterholms rule using his many acquaintances in high positions. His agents in Sweden were actively involved in his plots, notably his lover Magdalena Rudenschöld.

Many of his proposed plans were fanciful. One plan was to have Catherine II of Russia interfere by having a Russian naval force make a demonstration of force outside Stockholm and making political demands. This plan did not receive support at a sufficiently high level in Catherine's court, but Reuterholm's spies in Italy intercepted some of Armfelt's letters.

The intercepted letters provided evidence of treason. Rudenschöld, the former Royal Secretary Johan Albrecht Ehrenström and some others were arrested 18 December 1793. A Swedish warship was sent all the way to Naples with orders to the crew to arrest Armfelt and bring him to trial in Stockholm. His protectors at the court of Naples managed to save him from arrest at the last moment but in February 1794 he had to flee from Italy to Russia. Catherine II was unwilling to support Armfelt in any way, at least not in her capital, so he was sent to the distant town of Kaluga with his family.

Armfelt was convicted in his absence by Svea Court of Appeal on 22 July 1794 to forfeit his life, all honours and possessions, guilty of planning an armed coup. Rudenschöld and Ehrenström were also sentenced to death, and when the case reached the Supreme Court of Sweden, Johan Fredrik Aminoff was also sentenced to death. However, Duke Charles commuted all but Armfelt's death sentences to prison sentences.

== See also ==
- 1789 Conspiracy (Sweden)
- Anjala conspiracy
