= Coup of 1809 =

Deposition of Swedish King Gustav IV and establishment of constitutional democracy

- Part of the Finnish War and the Dano-Swedish War
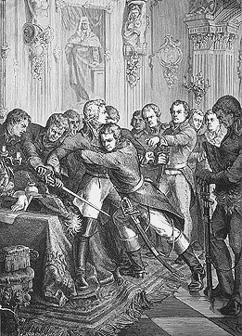
- Gustav IV Adolf's arrest during the Coup of 1809
Date	13 March 1809
Location	Sweden
Result	Coup successful

Belligerents
(Sweden) Men of 1809	(Sweden) Royal government

Commanders and leaders
(Sweden) Georg Adlersparre	(Sweden) Gustav IV Adolf

Casualties and losses
0	0

The Coup of 1809 (Swedish: Statskuppen 1809), also referred to as the Revolution of 1809 (Swedish: Revolutionen 1809), was a Swedish coup d'état on 13 March of that year by a group of noblemen led by Georg Adlersparre, with support from the Western Army. The coup resulted in the deposition of King Gustav IV Adolf and the introduction of a new Instrument of Government. The coup was provoked by the disastrous Finnish War. The leaders of the coup are known in history collectively as 1809 års män ('Men of 1809').

The coup executors convened a parliament or Riksdag, which met on 1 May, and handed over power to it. The Riksdag declared the king deposed and elected his uncle Charles XIII as the new king. In negotiating the new constitution, Charles XIII and subsequent kings were able to retain some measure of absolute power with the Royal Right of Disposal.

== See also ==
- Gustavian Party
- Ulrica Eleonora Rålamb
- Armfelt Conspiracy
