= 1789 Conspiracy =

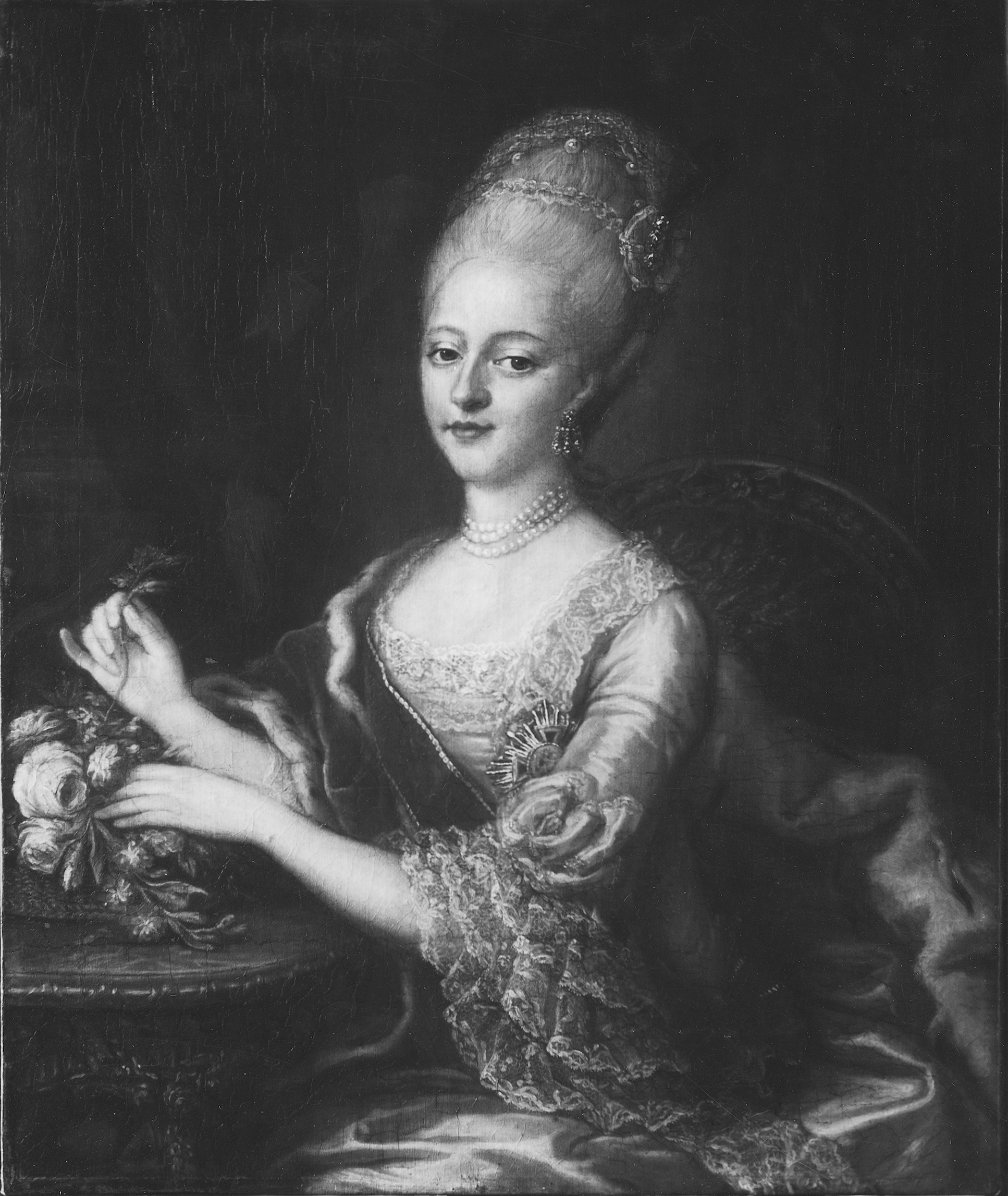
Hedvig Elisabet Charlotta

The 1789 Conspiracy was a plot in Sweden in 1789, with the purpose of deposing Gustav III of Sweden, and placing his brother Charles XIII of Sweden on the throne. The plot was instigated by a group of conspirators at the royal court, consisting, among others, of the king's sister-in-law, Charles' spouse Hedvig Elisabeth Charlotte of Holstein-Gottorp, the king's youngest brother Prince Frederick Adolf, Duke of Östergötland, and Charles' favorite Gustaf Adolf Reuterholm. The plot was influenced by the opposition of the nobility against Gustav III because of the Union and Security Act during the Russo-Swedish War (1788–1790), and the plan was to convince Charles to act as the central figure and symbol of this opposition. The plot was discontinued because Charles, when informed, refused to participate in it. The plot was never officially exposed and did not result in any legal action.

== See also ==
- Armfelt Conspiracy
- Anjala conspiracy
