= Riksdag of the Estates =

Assembly of the feudal estates of Sweden from the 15th–19th centuries

Riksdag of the Estates (Swedish: Riksens ständer; informally ståndsriksdagen) was the name used for the Estates of Sweden when they were assembled. Until its dissolution in 1866, the institution was the highest authority in Sweden next to the King. It was a Diet made up of the Four Estates, which historically were the lines of division in Swedish society:

- Nobility
- Clergy
- Burghers
- Peasants

The inclusion of a fourth estate, Bondeståndet, is a peculiarity of the Swedish realm, with few parallels in Europe. The English word peasant is however an inexact translation, as it did not include the entire peasantry, as it is usually defined in an English context. It did not include unlanded or semi-landed groups such as crofters, lodgers and seasonal labourers and of the three categories of Swedish bönder, that is peasants, it included only two. Those were the skattebönder ("tax peasants"), yeomen who owned their own land and were taxed, as well as the kronobönder ("Crown farmers" or "farmers of the Crown"), who farmed land owned by the Crown. The third group, the frälsebönder ("farmers of the nobility/gentry"), who farmed land owned by the nobility, were not represented, as they were considered to be represented by their landowners.

== Important assemblies ==
The meeting at Arboga in 1435 is usually considered to be the first Riksdag, but there is no indication that the fourth estate, the farmers, were represented there.

- The actual first meeting is likely the one that took place at Uppsala in 1436 after the death of the rebel leader Engelbrekt.
- At the Riksdag in 1517, regent Sten Sture the Younger and the Privy Council deposed archbishop Gustav Trolle.
- At Västerås in 1527 Lutheranism was adopted as the new state religion instead of Catholicism.
- At Västerås in 1544, an order of royal succession was adopted, abolishing elective monarchy in Sweden.
- At Arboga in 1561, the term Riksdag was used for the first time.
- At Söderköping in 1595, duke Charles was elected regent of Sweden instead of king Sigismund, who was a Catholic and the king of both Sweden and Poland.
- In 1612 the Riksdag gave the nobility the privilege and right to hold all higher offices of government, after successful lobbying by the Lord High Chancellor of Sweden Axel Oxenstierna as a reward to this estate in return for their pledge to loyally support the King (Gustavus Adolphus).
- The first open conflict between the different estates happened in 1650, when the three lower estates attacked the nobility's privileges. Queen Christina used the conflict to overcome opposition to her having named her cousin Charles Gustav as her heir. When she abdicated in 1654, he succeeded her as Charles X Gustav.
- At the Riksdag in 1680 a large scale reduction (a return of lands to the Crown earlier granted to the nobility) was enacted, and Sweden became an absolute monarchy. The King's absolute power was confirmed when the Riksdag of the Estates in 1693 officially proclaimed that the king was the sole ruler of Sweden.
- In 1719, the Riksdag elected Ulrika Eleonora as heir in place of her older sister's son, and Ulrika Eleonora accepted a new constitution restoring the powers of the Riksdag.
- In 1771–1772, when Gustav III after his Revolution of 1772 introduced a new Instrument of Government.
- In 1789, the Riksdag accepted an addition to the instrument of government from 1772. This new law, the Union and Security Act, abolished most noble privileges and commoners, regardless of rank, could hold virtually any office Sweden.
- In 1809, the Riksdag elected Charles XIII king after his nephew Gustav IV Adolf had been deposed, and after the new king had accepted a new constitution that ended Sweden's second Autocracy (1789–1809).
- At the sessions in 1634, 1719, 1720, 1772 and 1809 new constitutions were adopted.

== Replaced by the new Riksdag ==
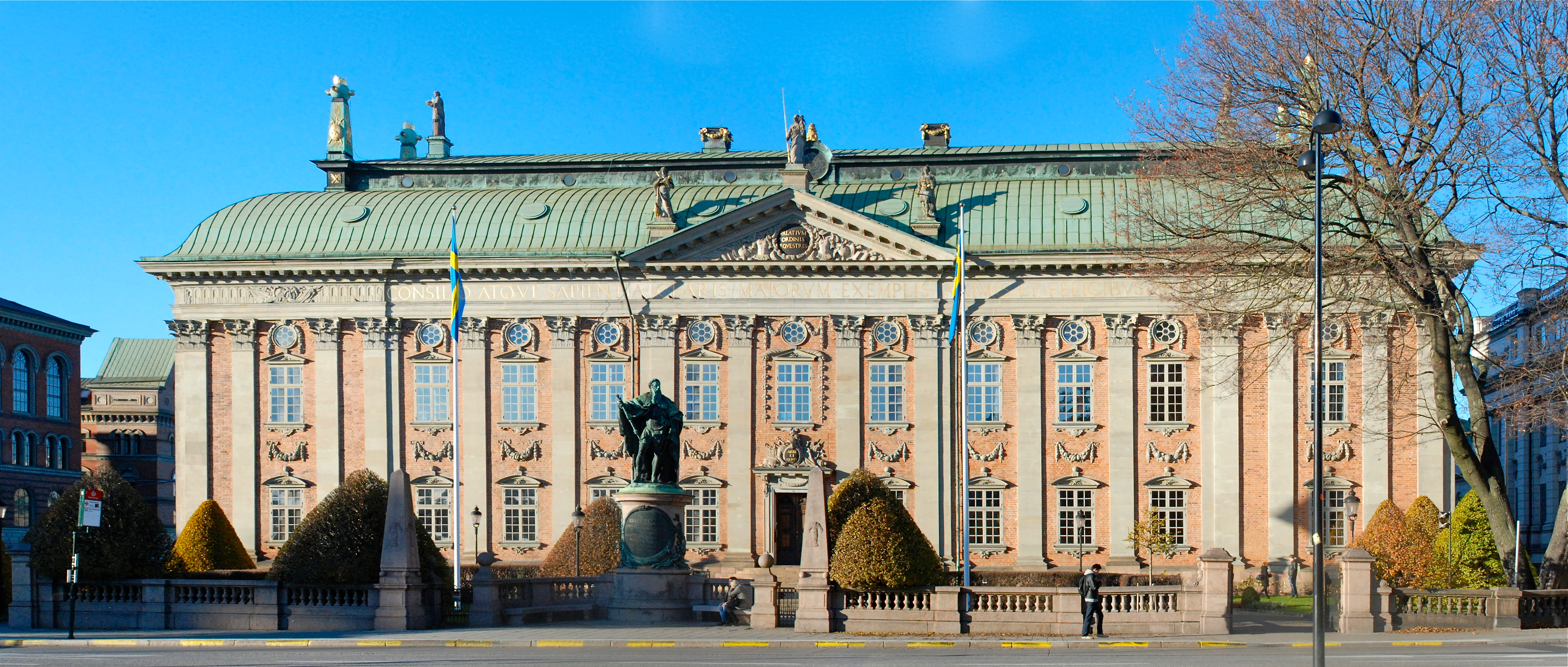
The House of Nobility, seat of the Swedish nobility.

The constitution of 1809 divided the powers of government between the monarch and the Riksdag of the Estates, and after 1866 between the monarch and the new Riksdag. In 1866 all the Estates voted in favor of dissolution and at the same time to constitute a new assembly, Sveriges Riksdag. The four former estates were abolished. The House of Nobility (Swedish: Riddarhuset) remained as a quasi-official representation of the Swedish nobility until 2003. Although the Nobility remains as a legal entity it is no longer an entity of public law but merely a private association. All Noble privileges have been abolished. However, a number of entailed properties (fidekomisser) remain to be commuted (that is, turned into limited liability companies). The modern Centre Party, which grew out of the Swedish farmers' movement, could be construed as a modern representation with a traditional bond to the Estate of the Farmers.

== Riksdag in Finland ==
Following the Finnish War in 1809, Sweden ceded its eastmost provinces to the Russian Empire. Comprising much of present-day Finland, these became a Grand Duchy under the Emperor, but the political institutions were kept practically intact. The Finnish estates assembled in 1809 at Porvoo to confirm the change in their allegiance. This Diet of Finland followed the forms of the Swedish Riksdag, being the legislative body of the new autonomous region. However, during the reigns of Alexander I and Nicholas I it was not assembled and no new legislation was enacted. The diet was next assembled by tsar Alexander II in 1863, due to the need to modernize the laws. After this the Diet met regularly until 1905, when it passed an act forming a new unicameral parliament. That assembly has been Finland's legislative body since then. The Finnish House of Nobility (Finnish: Ritarihuone; Swedish: Riddarhuset) carries on the tradition of the Estate of Nobility, but no new families have been ennobled since 1906.

== See also ==
- History of Sweden
- History of Finland
- History of the Riksdag
- Riksdagsmusiken

== Literature ==
- Stig Hadenius, The Riksdag in Focus: Swedish History in a Parliamentary Perspective, Coronet Books Incorporated, 1997.
