= Instrument of Government (1772) =

Swedish constitution

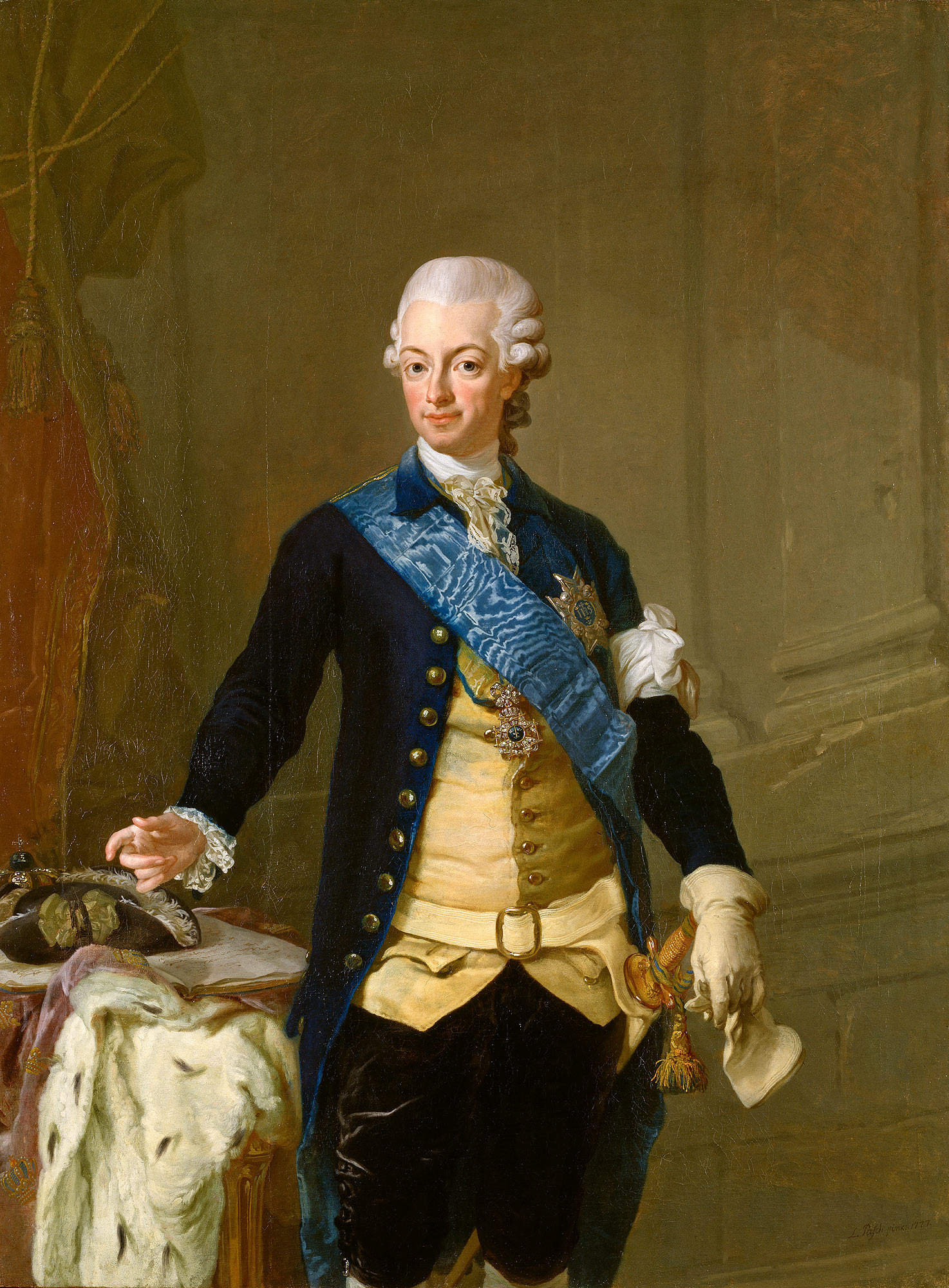
Gustav III of Sweden

The 1772 Instrument of Government (Swedish: regeringsform) was the constitution of the Kingdom of Sweden from 1772 to 1809. It is also known as the "Swedish-Finnish Constitution". It was promulgated well in advance of the Revolution of 1772 for greater division of powers, a self-coup mounted by King Gustav III, and replaced the 1720 Instrument of Government, which had been in force for most of the Age of Liberty (1719-72). Although in theory the 1772 Instrument merely readjusted the balance of power between the Crown and the Riksdag of the Estates (Swedish Parliament), without changing Sweden's status as a constitutional monarchy, in practice it is generally seen as instituting an absolute monarchy, especially after its modification in 1789 by the Union and Security Act, which further strengthened royal power at the expense of the Riksdag. It remained in force throughout the Gustavian era, until replaced by the 1809 Instrument of Government as a result of the Coup of 1809.

In Finland, which was ceded to Russia in 1809 before Sweden adopted a new constitution, the 1772 Instrument took on a special role. Finnish officials and legal scholars maintained that it still applied under the Grand Duchy, and it became an important reference point in constitutional debates during the Russification period. In 1918 it was used as the legal basis for an attempt to establish a Finnish monarchy, before finally being replaced by the republican constitution of 1919.

== Background ==
During the Age of Liberty (1719–1772), Sweden was governed as a constitutional monarchy, initially under the Instrument of Government (1719) and later under the near-identical Instrument of Government (1720). Under this system, the king played a relatively minor role in the government, which was instead dominated by the Riksdag of the Estates, with most of the executive functions of government being discharged by the Council of the Realm (Swedish: riksråd). The Age of Liberty is generally remembered as a golden age of political and artistic freedom, but it was also characterised by factional struggles between the so-called "Cap" and "Hat" parties in the Riksdag and by military humiliation in the Hats' War (1741–1743) and the Pomeranian War (1757–1762). Indeed, some historians argue that by the early 1770s the situation had deteriorated to the extent that Sweden was on the brink of anarchy.

Gustav III was therefore able to attract considerable support for his scheme to overthrow the government and replace the 1720 Instrument of Government with a new constitution. On 19 August 1772 the king rallied the Stockholm garrison and arrested the Council of the Realm, along with several prominent members of the Cap party. Two days later he convened a session of the Riksdag and compelled it to accept a new constitution which he had drawn up, the 1772 Instrument of Government.

== Description ==
The Instrument of Government was a somewhat curious mix of different influences. In part it was based on earlier Swedish political traditions, harking back above all to the reign of the revered King Gustav II Adolf; for example, it revived the posts of Lord High Chancellor and Lord High Steward, which had once been among the Great Offices of the Realm but had fallen out of use in the previous century.

On the other hand, large parts of the Instrument were also inspired by recent Enlightenment ideas, in particular Montesquieu's notion of the separation of powers. This concept would also be one of the main principles behind the US Constitution, drawn up four years later, and indeed Gustav was an avowed admirer of the nascent United States.

However, while Gustav may have admired republican concepts like the separation of powers in theory, in practice he tended to rule as an enlightened despot, akin to contemporaries such as Joseph II of Austria and Frederick the Great of Prussia, rather than as a constitutional monarch. The phraseology of the Instrument of Government was rather vague, in part due to its having been written in haste in the aftermath of the coup, and although it invoked ideas like the separation of powers, it provided few practical checks upon the king's power. Moreover, in 1789 Gustav removed many of the few limits which did exist upon his power by compelling the Riksdag to pass the Union and Security Act, which revised the Instrument of Government in a more nakedly authoritarian direction.

=== Details ===
Significant provisions of the Instrument of Government included the following:

- The king governed the civil service and Parliaments were assembled only at the king's will when the king had to raise taxes and legislate (legislation was regulated in articles 40-43). An offensive war also had to be approved by Parliament (article 48) and also new taxation (articles 45-46).
- The Privy Council's justice department (Swedish: Justitierevisionen), functioned as a fairly independent Supreme Court (the king had two votes in this Court's judgements, as in all decisions by the council in the Age of Liberty). The Privy Council did not however function so much as a political institution as in the Age of Liberty, and in these matters the king could put it aside and listen to other advisors and councillors as the king also often did.
- The king however, had to listen to the advice of the Privy Council in cases concerning treaties about peace, armistice and alliances with foreign powers and (state) visits to other countries. In these cases the council also could veto the king, if all members of the Council shared this view unanimously.

== Coup of 1809 ==
After the Swedish defeat in the Finnish War and the cession of Finland to Russia, a coup d'état was mounted against Gustav's son and successor, King Gustav IV Adolf, by disgruntled liberals and army officers. The king was forced to abdicate and sent into exile, and a new constitution was then drawn up, the Instrument of Government (1809), which superseded the 1772 Instrument.

== In Finland after 1809 ==
In the Grand Duchy of Finland, created in 1809 from the eastern third of Sweden as part of the Russian Empire, the 1772 Instrument of Government had a peculiar status. While the Russian emperors, reigning in Finland as grand dukes, never gave any indication that they considered their autocratic powers limited by any constitution, a theory was developed in Finland that the old Instrument of Government remained in force, mutatis mutandis, with Finland's position as part of the Empire having the nature of a personal union. This theory was, however, never put forward officially and never accepted in St. Petersburg. It did gain considerable popular currency in Finland, so that Russification measures instituted from the 1890s onwards were commonly decried as an "unconstitutional" assault on the country's autonomy. The "Constitutionalists" (perustuslailliset) were an important political faction in Finland at this time, and their legacy of constitutional legalism has had a significant effect on later Finnish politics.

The matter remained officially uncontested and arguably unresolved for more than a century, but after the abdication of Nicholas II in 1917, the Parliament of Finland, as successor to the old Estates of the Realm, moved to assume sovereign power in Finland, based on the old Swedish provisions in case of a vacancy on the throne. This led to a power struggle with the Provisional Government of Russia, as well as within Finland, culminating, after the October Revolution, in the Finnish declaration of independence.

In 1918, the "rump Parliament", without the participation of the Social Democrats who were the largest party before the Finnish Civil War, invoked the Instrument of Government as the constitutional basis for establishing a monarchy. The proponents regarded a monarchy as a means of securing close ties with Germany, and the parliament elected Friedrich Karl of Hesse, a brother-in-law of Emperor Wilhelm II of Germany, as King of Finland. However, Germany's defeat in World War I soon made the plan untenable, and Friedrich Karl renounced the throne before acceding. The monarchy project was abandoned, and in 1919 Finland adopted a new republican constitution, which superseded the old instrument of government.

== See also ==
- Gustav III
- Constitution of Sweden
- Constitution of Finland
- Diet of Porvoo
- Russification of Finland
- Walhalla-orden
