= Union and Security Act =

Swedish law from 1789

The Union and Security Act (Swedish: Förenings- och säkerhetsakten, Finnish: Yhdistys- ja vakuuskirja), alternatively Act of Union and Security, was proposed by King Gustav III of Sweden to the assembled Estates of the Realm during the Riksdag of 1789. It was a document, adding to the Swedish Constitution of 1772 new provisions. The King strengthened his grip on power while at the same time riding on a popular wave that also meant a decrease in aristocratic power. It has been described as "fundamentally conservative".

== Passage ==
During the Russo-Swedish War, in February 1789, Gustav summoned the Riksdag of the Estates and placed an Act of Union and Security before them. Three of the four estates accepted it, but the Nobles rejected it. Since three of the four Estates accepted it, it was passed and became law.

== Contents ==
The Act of Union and Security gave the King the sole power to declare war and make peace instead of sharing the power with the estates and the Privy Council. The estates would lose the ability to initiate legislation, but they would keep the ability to vote on new taxes.

Another provision was that the King was enabled to determine the number of Privy Councillors and so he could abolish the Council altogether by determining their number to be zero. The judicial branch of the Privy Council (in Swedish: Justitierevisionen) was then transferred to a new Supreme Court.

Most noble privileges were abolished with the Act, with most offices now available to all regardless of rank. Noble lands could now be bought by anyone instead of only by nobles.

The law was in effect in Sweden until 1809, and in Finland until 1919.

== See also ==
- Constitution of Sweden
- Constitution of Finland
- 1789 Conspiracy (Sweden)
