= Politics of Sweden =

The politics of Sweden take place in a framework of a parliamentary representative democratic constitutional monarchy. Executive power is exercised by the government, led by the Prime Minister. Legislative power is vested in both the government and parliament, elected within a multi-party system. The judiciary is independent, appointed by the government and employed until retirement. Sweden is formally a monarchy with a monarch holding symbolic power.

The history of democracy in Sweden can be said to begin with the old Viking age "Ting" electing kings, evolving into a hereditary royal power in the 16th century, that in periods became more or less democratic. The current democratic regime is a product of a stable development of successively added democratic institutions introduced during the 19th century up to 1921, when women's suffrage was introduced. The Government of Sweden has adhered to parliamentarism — de jure since 1975, de facto since 1917.

Since the Great Depression, Swedish national politics has largely been dominated by the Social Democratic Workers' Party, which has held a plurality (and sometimes a majority) in the Swedish parliament since 1917. General elections are held every four years.

The Economist Intelligence Unit rated Sweden a "full democracy" in its report for 2020. According to the V-Dem Democracy indices Sweden was 2023 the third most electoral democratic country in the world. According to Freedom House Sweden scored 40/40 for protection of political rights in 2020.

== Constitution ==
The Constitution of Sweden consists of four fundamental laws. The most important is the Instrument of Government of 1974 which sets out the basic principles of political life in Sweden, defining rights and freedoms. The Act of Succession is a treaty between the old Riksdag of the Estates and House of Bernadotte regulating their rights to accede to the Swedish throne. The constitution differs from most other Western countries in aspects such as having a unicameral parliament, limited municipal autonomy, and the lack of a supreme court with power to overturn acts of the legislature. Instead of checks and balances the executive power is entrusted to the politicians.

The four fundamental laws are:

- Instrument of Government (1974)
- Act of Succession (1809)
- Freedom of the Press Act (1766)
- Fundamental Law on Freedom of Expression (1991)

== Monarchy ==
A hereditary monarch, currently King Carl XVI Gustaf of the House of Bernadotte serves as head of state since 1973. His authority is formal, symbolic, and representational.

Heiress apparent to the throne is Crown Princess Victoria since 1980.

== Executive branch ==
=== Head of government ===
The prime minister of Sweden is nominated by the speaker of the Riksdag and elected through negative parliamentarism. In practice, this means that the prime minister nominee is confirmed if fewer than 175 members of parliament vote 'no', regardless of the number of 'yes' votes or abstentions.

Following a lengthy government formation process as a result of the general election held on 9 September 2018, Stefan Löfven of the Swedish Social Democratic Party was re-elected prime minister of Sweden for a second term by the new parliament on 18 January 2019, after initially being ousted by parliament. Together with the Green Party, Löfven presided over a minority government which relied on confidence and supply from the Centre Party and Liberals.

The deputy prime minister was Isabella Lövin of the Green Party.

In August 2021, Prime Minister Stefan Löfven announced his resignation and Finance Minister Magdalena Andersson was elected as the new head of Sweden's ruling Social Democrats in November 2021. On 30 November 2021, Magdalena Andersson became Sweden's first female prime minister. She formed a minority government made up of only her Social Democrats. Her plan for forming a new coalition government with the Green Party was unsuccessful because her budget proposal failed to pass.

On 18 October 2022, Ulf Kristersson of the Moderate Party became the new prime minister of Sweden. Kristersson's Moderates formed a centre-right coalition with the Christian Democrats and the Liberals. The new government is backed by the biggest right-wing party, Sweden Democrats (SD) led by Jimmie Åkesson, with tougher immigration policies being a crucial part of a policy deal with the SD.

=== Government ===
The highest executive authority of the state is vested in the government, which consists of a prime minister and roughly 22 ministers who head the ministries. The ministers are appointed at the sole discretion of the prime minister. The prime minister is nominated by the speaker and appointed following a vote in the Riksdag itself. The monarch plays no part in this process. The only way to oust a government is through a motion of no confidence (misstroendevotum) in the Riksdag. This motion must get a majority of the total number of votes in the Riksdag (at least 175). Another example of the power the legislature has given the government is the adoption of the budget in the Riksdag. The government's proposition to budget is adopted, unless a majority of the members of the Riksdag vote against it. This is to make it possible to govern even in minority.

The main functions of the government are to:

- Present bills to the Riksdag
- Implement decisions taken by the Riksdag
- Exercise responsibility for the budget approved by the Riksdag
- Represent Sweden in the European Union
- Enter into agreements with other states
- Directing central government activities

== Legislative branch ==
The unicameral Riksdag has 349 members, popularly elected every four years. It is in session generally from September through mid-June.

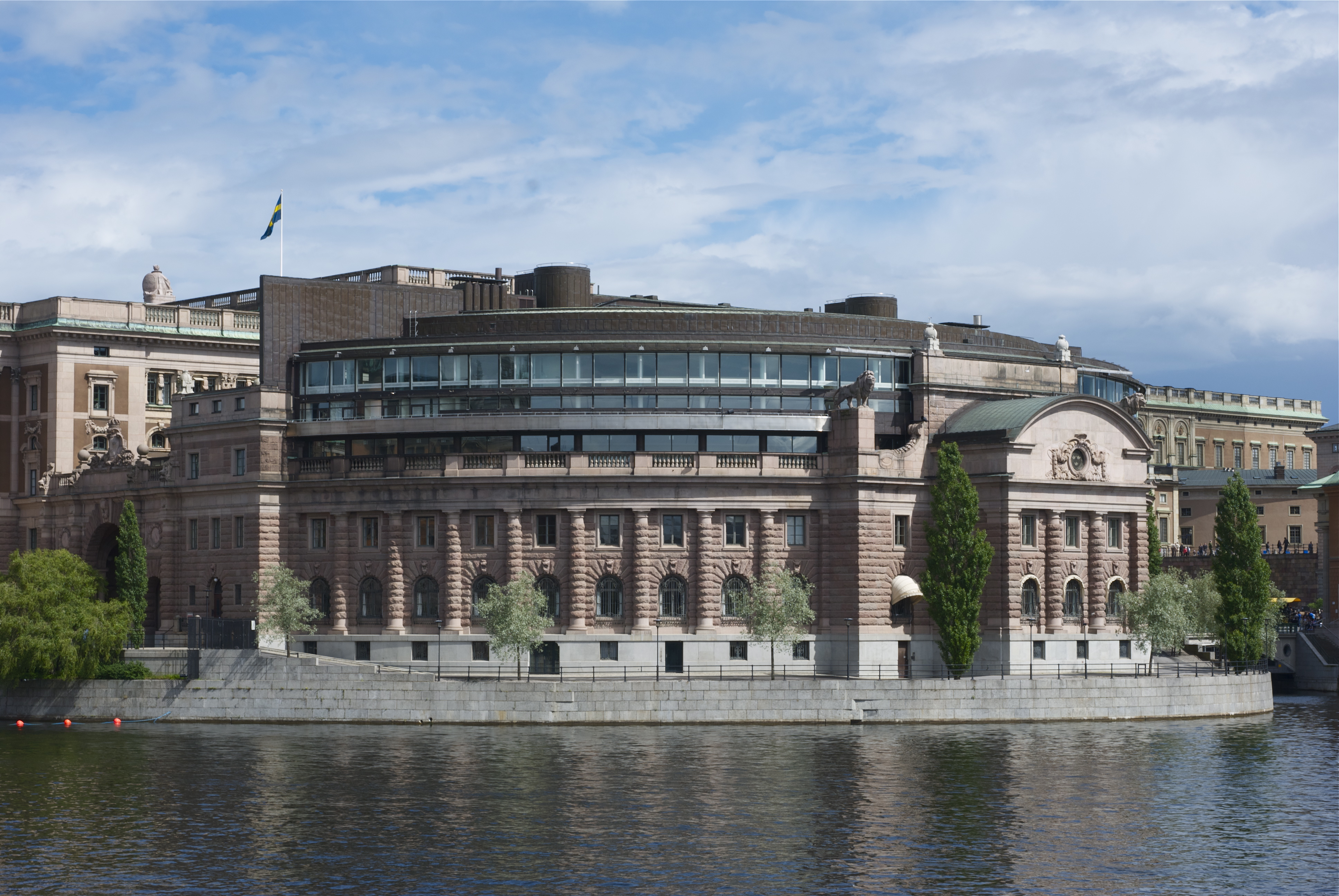
The Riksdag in Stockholm

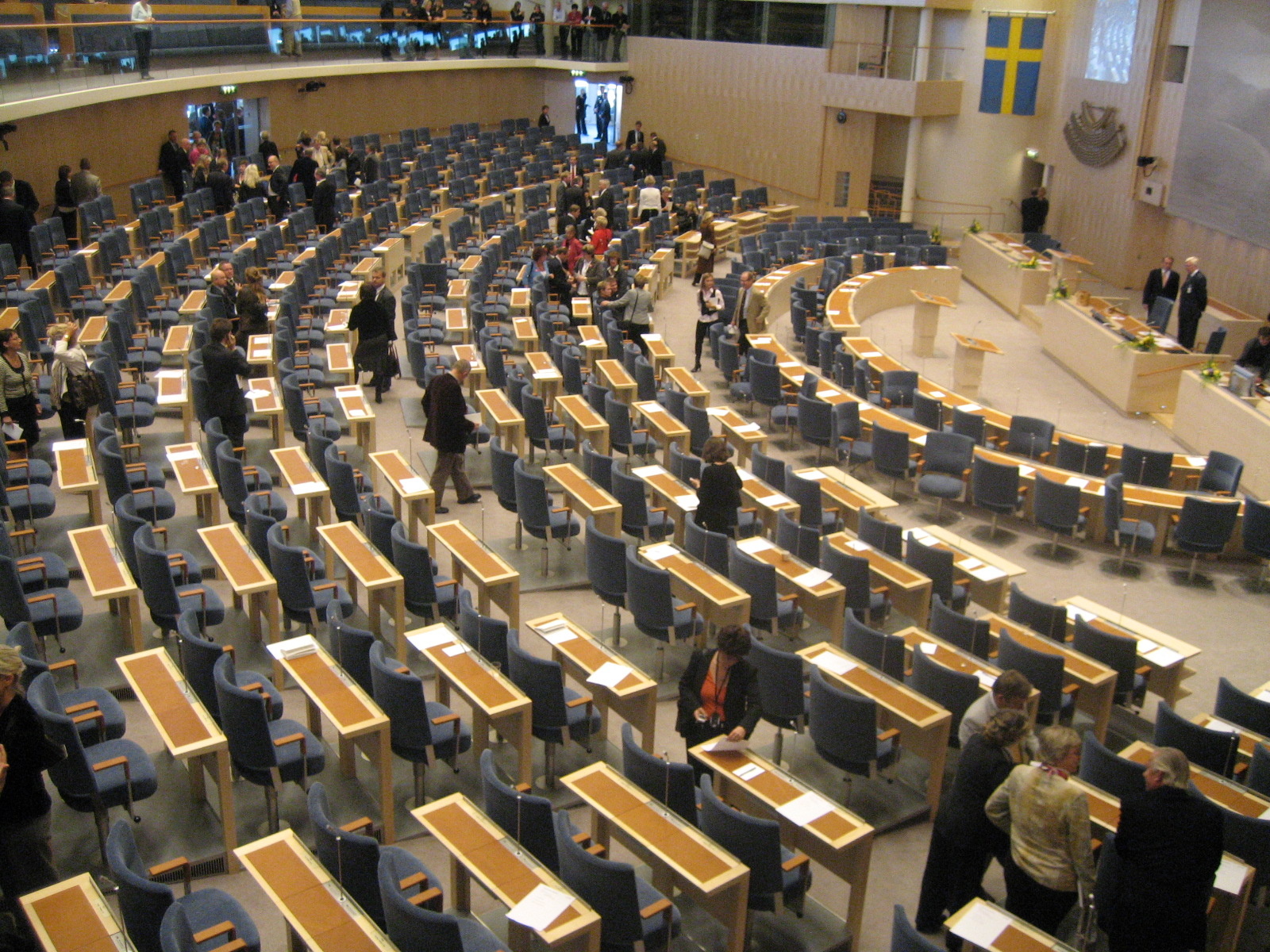
Inside the Riksdag

Legislation may be initiated by the Cabinet or by members of the Riksdag. Members are elected on the basis of proportional representation for a four-year term. The Riksdag can alter the Constitution of Sweden, but only with approval by a supermajority and confirmation after the following general elections.

The Swedish Social Democratic Party has played a leading political role since 1917, after Reformists confirmed their strength and the revolutionaries left the party. After 1932, the Cabinets have been dominated by the Social Democrats. Only six general elections (1976, 1979, 1991, 2006, 2010 and 2022) have given the centre-right bloc enough seats in the Riksdag to form a government. This is considered one reason for the Swedish post-war welfare state, with a government expenditure of slightly more than 50% of the gross domestic product.

== Political parties and elections ==
A general election is held alongside local and regional elections every four years. The last election was held on 11 September 2022.

== Judiciary ==
Swedish law, drawing on Germanic, Roman, and Anglo-American law, is neither as codified as in France and other countries influenced by the Napoleonic Code, nor as dependent on judicial practice and precedents as in the United States.

- Courts: Civil and criminal jurisdiction
  - Supreme Court or Högsta domstolen (literally The Highest Court) Note: the supreme court has no power to overturn any laws, including laws in conflict with the constitution.
  - Courts of appeal or Hovrätter (literally Royal Court)
  - District courts or Tingsrätter (literally Thing assembly Court)
- Administrative Courts: Litigation between the Public and the Government.
  - The Supreme Administrative Court or Högsta förvaltningsdomstolen (literally Government/Regent Court)
  - Administrative courts of appeal or Kammarrätter (literally Chamber Court)
  - Administrative courts or Förvaltningsrätt (literally Administration Court)
- Ombudsman:
  - The Parliamentary Ombudsman or Justitieombudsmannen,
  - The Chancellor of Justice or Justitiekanslern

== Government agencies ==
Government policy is carried out by the administrative authorities (förvaltningsmyndigheter) and government agencies of Sweden. These bodies are state-controlled and are formally headed by government-appointed directors-general but act independently from the executive and legislative branches of government. Ministerial governance (ministerstyre) is illegal; in accordance with 2 §, chapter 12 of the Instrument of Government, no member of the Riksdag or government may interfere in the day-to-day operation of an agency, nor in the outcome of individual cases.

== Politicians ==
Sweden has a history of strong political involvement by ordinary people through its "popular movements" (folkrörelser), the most notable being trade unions, the women's movement, the temperance movement, and – more recently – sports movement. Election turnout in Sweden has always been high in international comparisons, although it has declined in recent decades, and is around 87%, (87.18% in the general election of 2018).

Some Swedish political figures that have become known worldwide include Joe Hill, Carl Skoglund, Raoul Wallenberg, Folke Bernadotte, Dag Hammarskjöld, Olof Palme, Carl Bildt, Hans Blix, and Anna Lindh.

According to a survey investigation by the sociologist Jenny Hansson, Swedish national parliamentarians have an average work week of 66 hours, including side responsibilities. Hansson's investigation further reports that the average Swedish national parliamentarian sleeps 6.5 hours per night.

== Administrative divisions ==
Sweden is divided into 21 counties. In each county there is a county administrative board and a county council. Each county contains several municipalities, in total 290. Stockholm is the capital of Sweden. The king, the Riksdag and the government have their permanent seat in Stockholm. Up to 1968 when the Overgovernor's Office was incorporated into Stockholm County, it had a special status.

As of the 1974 constitutional revision, the number of municipal divisions was reduced from several thousand to 290, while also removing previous functions of the municipal governments (such as local laws, local law enforcement, and more).

== Political issues ==
The most important political issues in Sweden were according to a 2026 opinion poll health care, education, law and order and immigration.

=== Energy politics ===
After the 1973 oil crisis, the energy politics were determined to become less dependent on the import of petroleum. Since then, electricity has been generated mostly from hydropower and nuclear power. Sweden wants to be independent of petroleum use by 2020. The Three Mile Island accident (United States) prompted the Swedish parliament in 1980 after a referendum to decide that no further nuclear power plants should be built and that a nuclear power phase-out should be completed by 2010. Following the recommendation of the 1980 referendum, two nuclear power reactors were closed by government decision in 1999 and 2005, respectively. However, in February 2009, the Swedish centre-right wing government announced that new nuclear power stations may be constructed if they replace old ones, thus ending the previous de facto phase out policy.

As of 2005, the use of renewables amounted to 26% of the energy supply in Sweden, most important being hydropower and biomass. In 2003, electricity from hydropower accounted for 53 TWh and 40% of the country's production of electricity with nuclear power delivering 65 TWh (49%). At the same time, the use of biofuels, peat etc. produced 13 TWh of electricity. Sweden was the highest ranked country in the Climate Change Performance Index until 2022, when it was displaced by Denmark.

In March 2005, an opinion poll showed that 83% supported maintaining or increasing nuclear power. Since then however, reports about radioactive leakages at a nuclear waste store in Forsmark, Sweden, have been published. This does not seem to have changed the public support of continued use of nuclear power.

=== Foreign politics ===
Throughout the 20th century, Swedish foreign policy was based on the principle of non-alignment in peacetime, neutrality in wartime. This principle has often been criticised in Sweden, allegedly being a facade, claiming that the Swedish government had an advanced collaboration with western countries within NATO.

During Cold War era politics, Sweden was not under the Warsaw Pact and received only minimal aid from the Marshall Plan. In 1952, a Swedish DC-3 was shot down over the Baltic Sea while gathering reconnaissance. It was later revealed that the plane had been shot down by the Soviet Union. Another plane, a Catalina search and rescue craft, was sent out a few days later and shot down by Soviets warplanes as well.

Sweden is also very active in international peace efforts, especially through the United Nations, and in support to the Third World.

In 1995 Sweden, together with Finland and Austria, joined the European Union, which extended the number of member countries from 12 to 15. Membership and its issues are among the most important questions in Swedish politics. Apart from the European Union, Sweden is also an active member of the United Nations and several other organisations such as the Organisation for Economic Co-operation and Development and International Monetary Fund.

In May 2022, Sweden formally applied to join the NATO alliance. The public opinion in the Nordic region had changed in favour of joining NATO since Russia's Feb. 24 invasion of Ukraine.

Soon after his appointment in October 2022, new foreign minister, Tobias Billström, announced that Sweden will renounce "feminist foreign policy", implemented by the previous left-wing government. Sweden joined NATO on 7 March 2024.

== See also ==
- List of political parties in Sweden
- Swedish Armed Forces
- Referendums in Sweden
