= Instrument of Government (disambiguation) =

Instrument of Government was the constitution of the Commonwealth of England.

Instrument of Government (Swedish: Regeringsformen) may also refer one of the Basic Laws of Sweden:

- Instrument of Government (1634)
- Instrument of Government (1719)
- Instrument of Government (1720)
- Instrument of Government (1772)
- Instrument of Government (1809)
- Instrument of Government (1974)

The 1919 Constitution Act of Finland was also referred to as an "Instrument of Government" in Swedish.
