= Administrative courts of appeal in Sweden =

The administrative courts of appeal in Sweden (Swedish: kammarrätt) is the second tier for the general administrative courts in Sweden. The next and final instance is the Supreme Administrative Court (Swedish: Högsta förvaltningsdomstolen). There are four administrative courts of appeal, and they mostly handle cases and other judicial issues that have already been dealt with by the lower courts. In addition to this, they also act as court of first instance in cases related to the principle of public access to official records.

== Organization ==
Coat of arms of the administrative court of appeal of Gothenburg

The territorial jurisdiction (Swedish: domkrets) of the administrative courts of appeal, dividing Sweden into four court districts, is based on the geographic boundaries of several administrative courts, as prescribed by the government (1977:937). The administrative courts of appeal are:

- Sundsvall
- Gothenburg
- Stockholm
- Jönköping

In the administrative courts of appeal, a judge other than the president of a court or a division of a court is titled Judge of Appeal (Swedish: kammarrättsråd). A judge who presides over a division is titled Senior Judge of Appeal (Swedish: kammarrättslagman), and the head official of the administrative court of appeal is titled President, Administrative Court of Appeal (Swedish: kammarrättspresident).

Approximately 550 people work for the administrative courts of appeal in Sweden, and about 120 of them serve as permanent salaried judges (Swedish: ordinarie domare). Permanent salaried judges are appointed by the Government. Special provisions apply for the selection of judges and their dismissal, to guarantee the independence of the court, making them almost impossible to fire. There are also approximately 350 lay judges (Swedish: nämndeman) linked to the administrative courts of appeal. Lay judges are laymen, not legally qualified representatives of the people, appointed by the county councils, serving four years at a time.

The composition of the court varies. The bench usually constitutes a quorum with three qualified judges. However, two officers of the court is enough if they are in agreement about granting a leave to appeal. In certain cases, such as when the case involves decision about social welfare insurance and child custody cases, two lay judges are required to form part of the bench.

== Appeal ==
The Supreme Administrative Court needs to grant a leave to appeal, to consider a case. A permission to appeal will only be granted if there is reason to believe the case may be of importance as a precedent. Erroneous judgement by the lower courts is usually not sufficient for the Supreme Administrative Court to consider a case.

== List and map of general administrative courts ==
Administrative Court of Appeal in Sundsvall
- Falun
- Härnösand
- Luleå
- Umeå
Administrative Court of Appeal in Gothenburg
- Gothenburg
- Karlstad
- Malmö
Administrative Court of Appeal in Stockholm
- Stockholm
- Uppsala
Administrative Court of Appeal in Jönköping
- Jönköping
- Linköping
- Växjö

thunb

The clickable map shows geographic boundaries of the administrative courts of appeal and the lower courts.

== Note ==
1. Described in the Instrument of Government (1974), Chapter 11, Articles 6 and 7. The Letters Patent Act (SFS 1994:261) governs the dismissal of judges.
2. Map of administrative courts on the official website of the Swedish National Courts Administration and SFS 1977:937.
