= Ministerial rule =

Swedish legal concept

Ministerial rule (Swedish: ministerstyre) is the informal term for when a public authority in Sweden — including the Riksdag, or a decision-making body of a municipality — tries to influence how an administrative authority (Swedish: förvaltningsmyndighet) decides in a particular case relating to the exercise of public authority vis-à-vis an individual or a local authority, or the application of legislation. This is a violation against the Instrument of Government, the main part of the constitution of Sweden.

Swedish public administration is dualistic, meaning governmental departments are under the direct control of a minister, but the administrative authorities (or government agencies in other words) under these departments are ostensibly autonomous. The agencies work according to laws and rules decided on by the Riksdag, but apply them on their own accord. So while the agencies are formally associated with some department, a minister cannot exert control over these agencies on individual matters, and they do not have the authority to direct daily operations. Ministers are thus expressly prohibited to intervene in matters relating to the application of the law or the due exercise of an agency's authority, quite unlike the situation in many other countries. If the government believes that an agency has not applied the law correctly, its only remedy is to change the relevant legislation.

The reasoning behind this is to prevent government corruption and to ensure that laws and regulations are applied equally. It also incentivises the Government and Riksdag to get rid of hard-to-interpret or problematic laws and regulations. There are rare exceptions to this distinction, such as when a natural disaster or war occurs and there is a need for a shorter chain of command.

Government-owned commercial companies are not formally covered by the rule of Ministerstyre. However, the government still generally instructs them to maintain themselves in a commercial way and turn a profit. This can create conflicts.

The principle of ministerial governance came under debate in 2021, when the Cementa company, which produces most of the cement used in Sweden from a mine on Gotland, failed to get a permission to continue mining. The environmental agencies delayed the case repeatedly by issuing new interpretations of the vague environmental law, including during court trials. Facing risk of blocking a large part of Swedish industrial activities, the government made a temporary exception to the law, getting criticism of overruling an agency decision, ministerial governance.

== How government agencies are governed ==
The agencies do not have complete freedom to interpret the law and the government has a right to influence the agencies, but only through strictly general policy instruments which are described in the constitution. These instruments are:

- Acts of Law and Other Provisions – This includes laws adopted by the Riksdag and ordinances issued by the Government (Swedish: förordning). They are interpreted by courts of law.
- Financial Power – The Government Offices issues a letter of appropriation (Swedish: regleringsbrev) once a year, based on the budget set by the Riksdag, which regulates the general activities and overall objectives for an agency.
- Power of Appointment – The Government decides on the employment of agency heads, deputy directors-general and county directors. Special rules apply for the appointment and dismissal of permanent salaried judges and other positions, where independence is of vital importance.
- Parliamentary Control – This is done by the Swedish National Audit Office, the Parliamentary Ombudsman, the Chancellor of Justice and the administrative courts.

== See also ==
- Individual ministerial responsibility
- Sphere sovereignty
- Subsidiarity

== Notes ==
1. The Instrument of Government, Chapter 11, Articles 6 and 7. The Letters Patent Act (1994:261) governs the dismissal of certain employees, such as permanent salaried judges (Swedish: ordinarie domare) and the Prosecutor-General of Sweden.
