= SNCA =

SNCA may refer to:

- Seoul National Capital Area, region in South Korea
- Sistema Nacional de Creadores de Arte, Mexican culture organization
- Alpha-synuclein, a protein found in neural tissue, encoded by the SNCA gene
- Society of North Carolina Archivists, a statewide organization for archivists, librarians, and other professionals involved in the care of manuscripts
- Swedish National Courts Administration, an administrative authority for the Swedish courts
- Shit nobody cares about, internet slang abbreviation
