= Helena Jäderblom =

Swedish jurist and civil servant (born 1958)

Helena Jäderblom (born 16 October 1958) is a Swedish jurist and civil servant. From 2012 to 2018, she was a judge at the European Court of Human Rights. From 2018 to 2025, Jäderblom was president of Sweden's Supreme Administrative Court.

Born in Gothenburg, Jäderblom received a Master of Law degree from the University of Uppsala in 1983. After working as a court clerk for a couple of years, she became an assistant judge at the Administrative Court of Appeal in Stockholm in 1987 and later an associate judge at the same place.

She worked for the Ministry of Justice as legal adviser in the Division of Constitutional law from 1994 and also served as deputy director there. Between 2002 and 2005 she was head of the divions that prepared decisions on pardons for convicts.

From 2005 she was senior judge at the County Administrative Court in Stockholm, from 2007 chief judge at the Administrative court of Appeal in Stockholm and in 2011 she became judge at the Supreme Administrative Court of Sweden.

In April 2012, the Swedish government nominated her as one of three candidates to replace Elisabet Fura as the Swedish judge at the European Court of Human Rights. In June the same year she was elected new judge for a nine-year period by a majority of the Parliamentary Assembly of the Council of Europe. In 2018, Helena Jäderblom was appointed president of the Supreme Administrative Court of Sweden. She took office on 1 September 2018.

Jäderblom was one of the two judges who dissented in the S.A.S. v. France case where a majority found the French ban on face covering in compliance with the European Convention on Human Rights.

Legal offices
Preceded by Mats Melin	President of the Supreme Administrative Court of Sweden; 2018–2025	Succeeded by Linda Haggren
