= Migration Court =

A Migration Court is a type of administrative court within the Swedish legal system. They are part of the general administrative courts in Stockholm, Gothenburg, Malmö and Luleå.

The Migration Courts are the courts of appeal for decisions made by the Swedish Migration Agency, for example regarding asylum or residency in Sweden. Decisions by the Migration Courts can be appealed to the Migration Court of Appeal, part of the Administrative Court of Appeal in Stockholm, which is the supreme appellate court relating to migration law.
