= Högsta förvaltningsdomstolen =

Högsta förvaltningsdomstolen is the official name in Swedish for

- Supreme Administrative Court of Finland
- Supreme Administrative Court of Sweden
