= Judiciary of Sweden =

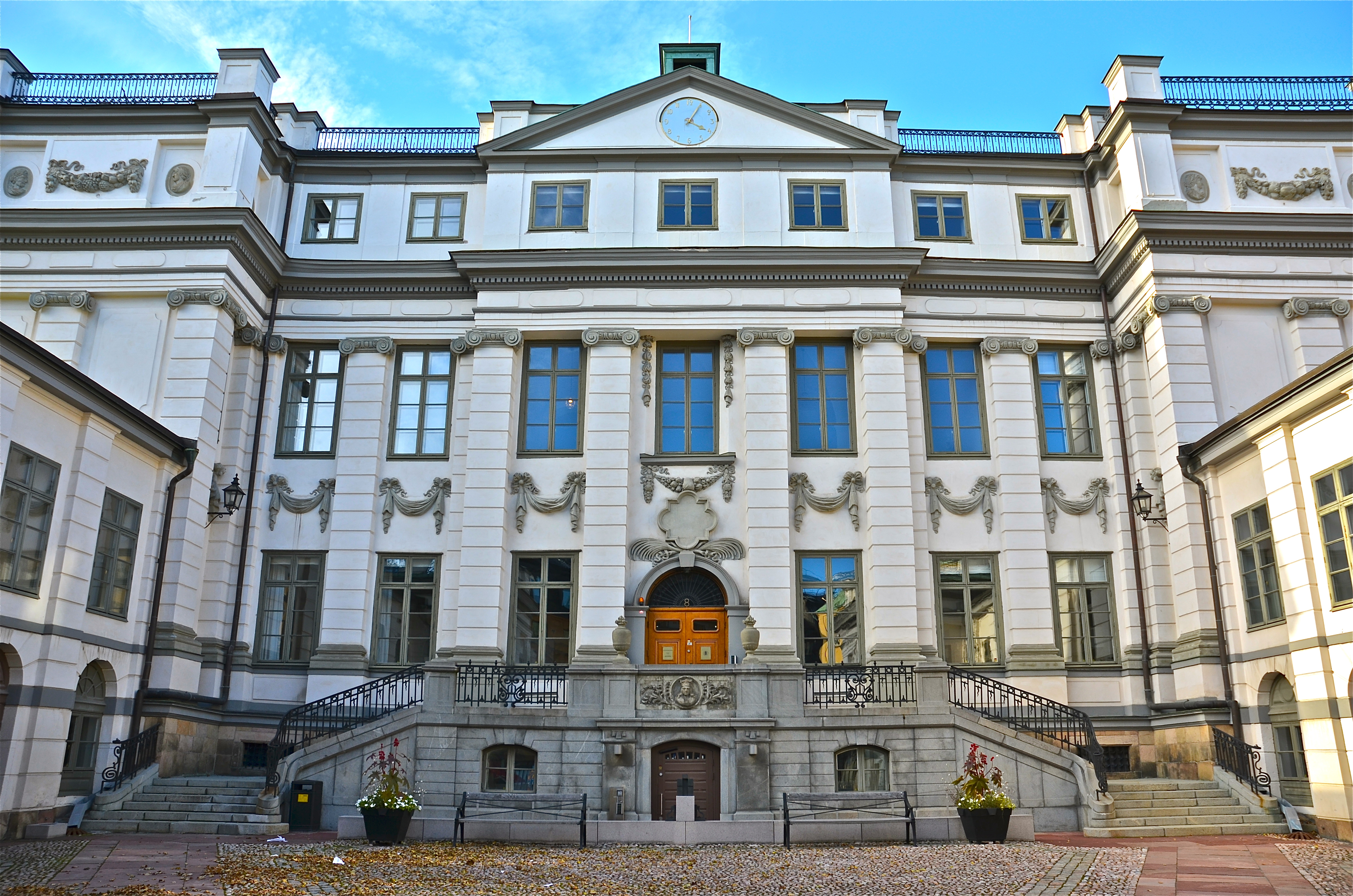
The Bonde Palace in Stockholm, housing the Supreme Court

The judicial system of Sweden consists of the law of Sweden and a number of government agencies tasked with upholding security and rule of law within the country. The activities of these agencies include police and law enforcement, prosecution, courts, and prisons and other correctional services.

== Courts ==
The courts are divided into two parallel and separate systems: The general courts (Swedish: allmänna domstolar) for criminal and civil cases, and general administrative courts (Swedish: allmänna förvaltningsdomstolar) for cases relating to disputes between private persons and the authorities. Each of these systems has three levels. Leave to appeal can be required for a review at the second and third level. There are also special courts and tribunals that hear specific cases.

=== General courts ===
The general courts deal with criminal cases, like an act defined in the Swedish Penal Code or in another law, for which a sanction is prescribed (e.g. theft or robbery). The general courts also handle some civil law disputes, for example, disputes over the contents of a business agreement or cases relating to family law, and a number of other non-contentious matters; such as adoption and appointment of legal guardians. Proceedings are generally open to the public, but access can be restricted for example in cases about sexual offences.

District courts

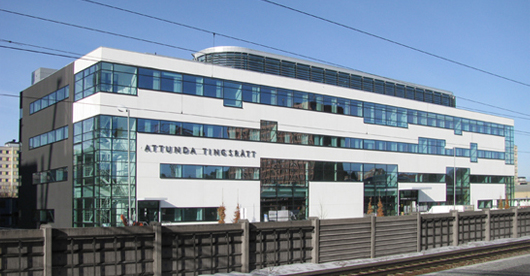
Attunda district court in Tureberg

There are 48 district courts (Swedish: tingsrätt). The district courts are the court of first instance for the general courts. In 1971, the tingsrätt became the district court all over Sweden, replacing the previous distinction between rådhusrätt in larger cities and häradsrätt for the assize courts of Sweden in other parts of the country.
Courts of appeal
There are six appellate courts (Swedish: hovrätt). The courts of appeal are the second instance on issues relating to criminal cases, contentious cases and other judicial issues that have already been dealt with by a district court. The appellate court may in some circumstances require a leave to appeal, meaning they will only proceed with a case if there is reason to believe they would arrive at a conclusion different to that of the district court.
Supreme Court
The supreme court (Swedish: Högsta domstolen) is the final instance of the general courts. A leave to appeal is required. This is granted by the court itself and basically only done when it is deemed important to establish a precedent for the lower courts.

=== General administrative courts ===
The general administrative courts handle numerous types of cases relating to disputes between private persons and the authorities. Over 500 different kinds of cases are assigned to the general administrative courts, like appeals against decisions made by the Swedish Tax Agency or the Swedish Social Insurance Agency.

Administrative courts
There are 12 administrative courts (Swedish: förvaltningsrätt). They are the court of first instance for the general administrative courts.
Administrative courts of appeal

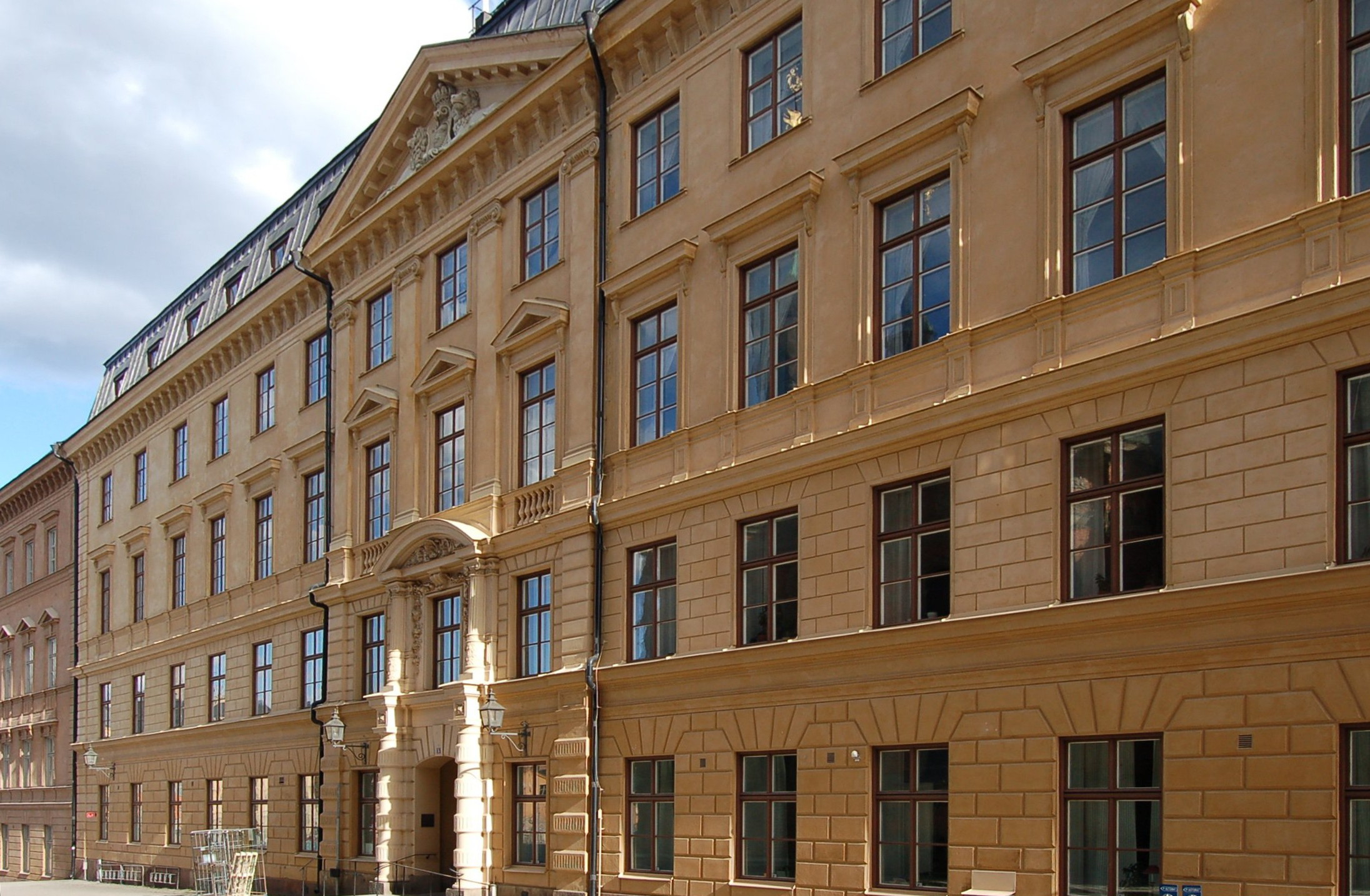
The Administrative Court of Appeal Stockholm

There are four administrative courts of appeal (Swedish: kammarrätt). They mostly handle cases and other judicial issues that have already been dealt with by the lower administrative courts, but also act as court of first instance in cases related to the principle of public access to official records. The court needs to grant a leave to appeal to hear a case; with the exception of tax cases, cases concerning the compulsory care for young people or adults with substance misuse problems, and people who are mentally ill. A leave of appeal is only granted if there's reason to believe a decision might be overturned, or set an important precedent in a higher court.
Supreme Administrative Court
The Supreme Administrative Court (Swedish: Högsta förvaltningsdomstolen) is the final instance of the general administrative courts. A permission to appeal will only be granted by the Supreme Administrative Court if there is reason to believe the case may be of importance as a precedent. Simple erroneous judicial decision-making by the lower courts is usually not sufficient for the court to consider a case.

=== Special courts ===
There are also a number of special courts, which will hear a narrower set of cases, as set down by legislation. These special courts has a narrow jurisdiction as defined by special laws. For example, the law about Land and Environmental courts (2010:921), the law Plan and Building act (2010:900) or the Foreign law or the Law of Foreigners (2005:716). Some of these courts are operated as divisions within courts of the general or general administrative courts. The special courts usually determine cases at the lowest level of the court system or at the first appeal level of the court system.

- Land and environmental courts (mark- och miljödomstolar): five district courts and one court of appeals, Svea hovrätt
- Migration courts (migrationsdomstolar): three county administrative courts and one administrative court of appeals, in Stockholm
- Maritime courts: seven district courts
- The Labour Court (Arbetsdomstolen)
- The Market Court (Marknadsdomstolen)
- The Court of Patent Appeals (Patentbesvärsrätten)
- The Defence Intelligence Court (Försvarsunderrättelsedomstolen)

A number of authorities are also very similar to special courts in the way they operate:

- Regional rent tribunals (hyresnämnder), of which there are eight, within district courts.
- Regional tenancy tribunals (arrendenämnder), of which there are eight, in the same locations as regional rent tribunals.
- The tribunal for traffic injuries (Trafikskadenämnden) in Stockholm. If the parties don't want to accept its recommendation, the case is appealed in the district court (tingsrätt). Other insurance matters have their own tribunals: Ansvarsförsäkringens Personskadenämnd, Ombudskostnadsnämnden, Personförsäkringsnämnden and Nämnden för rättsskyddsfrågor.
- The National Board for Consumer Complaints (Allmänna reklamationsnämnden) provides guidance, but without imposing sanctions or any penalties, but are often honoured.

== Law ==
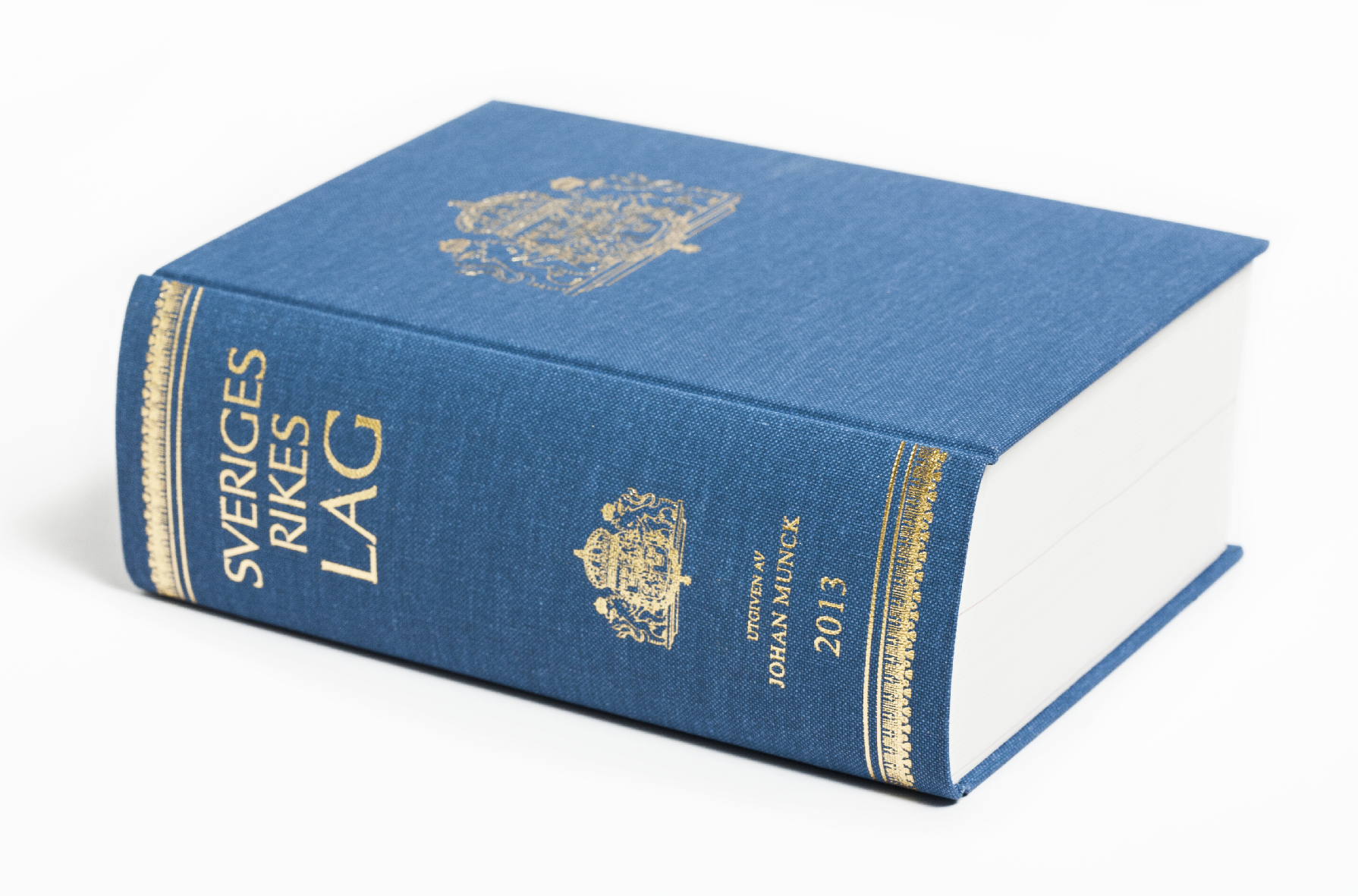
Sveriges rikes lag, the de facto statute book

Sweden has a penal law system, a civil law system and an extensive system of administrative law, all with laws created by the Parliament of Sweden. The Swedish internal law is by law subject to EU-law, international law and the European Convention on Human Rights.

Sweden allows for the court's free evaluation of evidence, including hearsay evidence.

The role of judicial review of legislation is generally not practiced by the courts; instead, the Council on Legislation gives non-binding opinions on legality. Courts are not bound by precedent, although it can be influential.

== Administration ==
The Ministry of Justice, a cabinet-level department in the government of Sweden headed by the Minister of Justice. It is primarily concerned with legislation concerning the judiciary. The actual day-to-day administration of the courts is the responsibility of the National Courts Administration (Domstolsverket).

== Personnel ==
After completing their legal education, graduates may become judges, prosecutors, or private attorneys. The government is the principal employer of law school graduates.

=== Judges ===
Judges start their career by applying to the Ministry of Justice, who accepts about 30% of applicants. They begin their training as assistants and court clerks for about 2 years, and after candidates pass the appropriate test, are assigned to a district court. After a broad range of assignments that may last up to 8 years, the government determines appointments and promotion of judges to permanent positions. Appellate judges sometimes must wait until they have 20 years of experience before they are appointed. To be appointed as an appellate judge, a judge must have the correct balance of good academic scores, solid research papers, several years of 'notable' litigating practice at both district and appellate courts, and voluntary service as providing legal aid as well as guest faculty providing lectures at Law Schools.

=== Prosecutors ===
Swedish prosecutors are lawyers who are employed by the Swedish Prosecution Authority (Swedish: Åklagarmyndigheten) and who direct the work of the police in cases concerning criminality. The prosecutor decides on whether to bring charges in a case, and appears in court. In all criminal cases, the prosecutors make decisions concerning arrests and charges on behalf of the public, and are the only public officials who can make such decisions - there is a possibility, rarely used, for private individuals to present a private prosecution (enskilt åtal) as well. (The exception is cases concerning crimes against the freedom of the press, for which the Chancellor of Justice acts as prosecutor.) In court, the prosecutor is not necessarily in an adversarial relationship to the defendant, but is under an obligation to investigate and present information which is to the advantage of the defendant as well as to his or her disadvantage. He is not a member of the bench, nor does he participate in the private deliberations of the court.

The prosecutor is also the only public official who can decide to appeal public prosecution cases to courts of appeal. (As well as the defence, victims, their representatives and other parties to the case (målsäganden) can also appeal.) When a case has been decided by a court of appeal, the right to appeal to the Supreme Court passes from the prosecutor of the individual case to the Prosecutor-General of Sweden (Swedish: riksåklagaren).

==== Chancellor of Justice ====
The Chancellor of Justice (justitiekanslern) is by law a direct subject of the Government of Sweden, the chief legal advisor to the government and the Minister, represents Sweden in civil litigation, and also has oversight responsibility similar to that of an ombudsman. The Chancellor also has duties with respect to the Freedom of the Press Act and the Fundamental Laws on Freedom of Expression, two of the four constituent pieces of the Constitution of Sweden. The Chancellor is the sole prosecutor in cases concerning offences against the freedom of the press and the freedom of expression.

=== Advocates ===
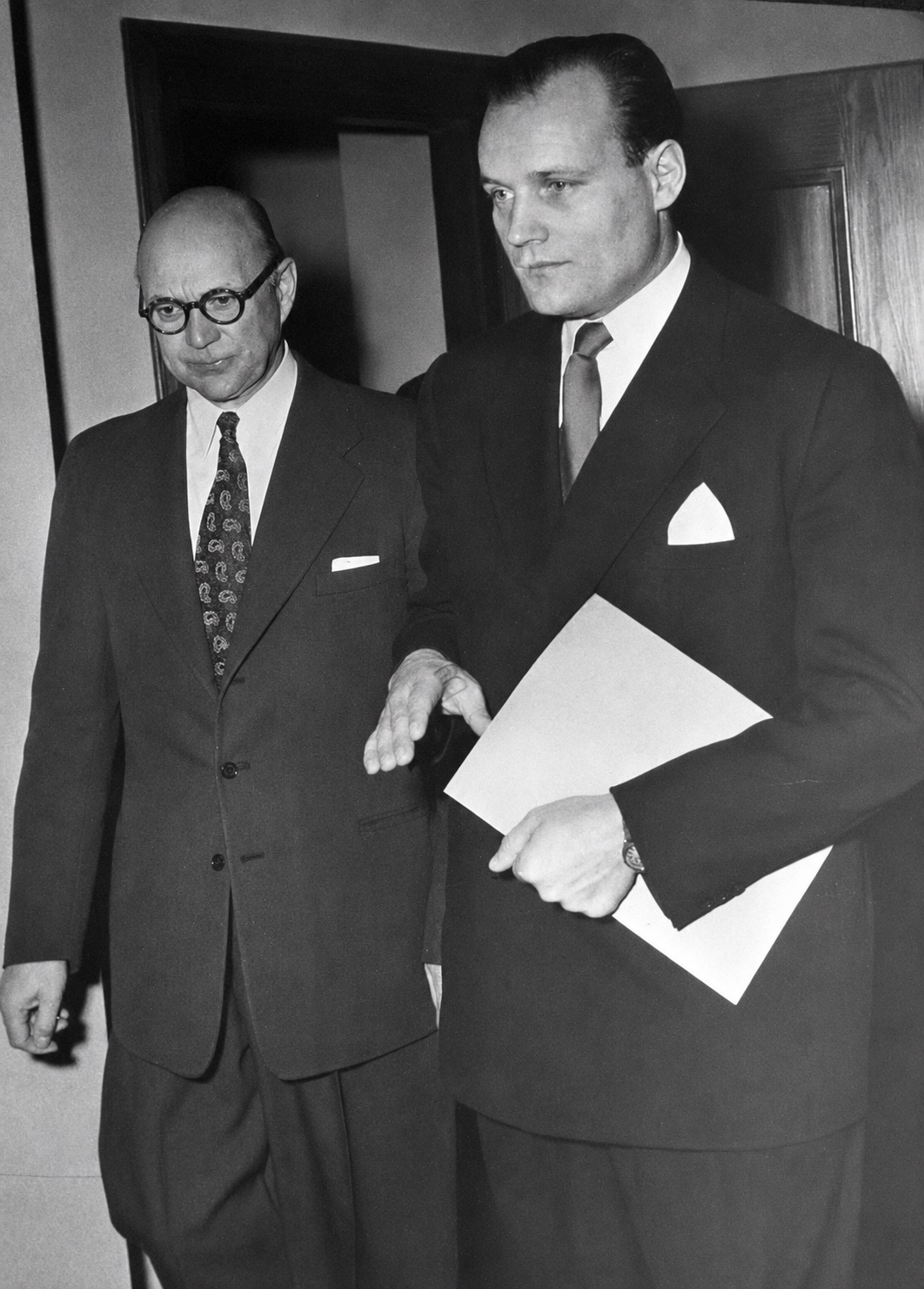
Henning Sjöström (right), regarded as Sweden's first celebrity lawyer due to his high-profile cases.

A lawyer becomes an advokat or advocate when they are admitted to the Swedish Bar Association after they graduate from law school as a Candidate of Law and have practiced law for at least 3 years. A board of the Swedish Bar Association supervises members and may disqualify an advokat from practicing law. The Prosecutor General may request the board take action pursuant to the Code on Judicial Procedure.

Compared with other countries, the number of attorneys (advocates) in private practice is small.

In principle, only an advokat are appointed as a public defender, though the advocate title is not a hardened requirement. The person assigned a "public defender" may however reject the defender and has a legal right to represent himself or herself, and may also choose their own defender, who may or may not be a member of the Swedish Bar Association.

=== Lay judges ===
In Sweden, lay judges (nämndemän, also known as lay assessors) sit alongside professional judges in district and appellate general and administrative courts. Lay judges are always in the majority in district courts, whereas the professional judges are in the majority in the appellate courts.

Municipal assemblies appoint lay judges for the district courts and the county councils appoint lay judges for the appellate and county administrative courts. They are appointed for a period of 4 years, and may not refuse appointment without valid excuse such as an age of 60 years. Typically, a lay judge will serve one day per month in court during his or her tenure.

In principle, any adult can become a lay judge. Lay judges must be Swedish citizens and under 70 years old. People that cannot be lay judges are judges, court officers, prosecutors, police, attorneys, and professionals engaged in judicial proceedings. In practice, lay judges in Sweden are more elderly, wealthier, and better educated. Lay judges are usually politicians from the local authority from which they are appointed, appointed in proportion to political party representation at the last local elections.

The use of lay judges in Sweden goes back to medieval times, for instance the Law of Uppland (1296).

=== Juries ===
Jurors (jurymän) who decide cases outside the presence of judges are only used in press libel cases and other cases concerning offenses against freedom of the press. Unless the parties agree to waive a jury trial, the question of whether or not the printed material falls outside permissible limits is submitted to a jury of nine members. In these cases, six of the nine jurors must find against the defendant, and may not be overruled in cases of acquittal.

The most frequently prosecuted offence under this act is defamation, although in total eighteen offences, including high treason and espionage, are covered. Sentencing is the sole prerogative of judges.

Jurors are appointed for each county by the county or municipal council for four-year terms, divided into two groups of sixteen and eight jurors, or twenty-four and twelve jurors for Stockholm County, where jurors in the second group should be or have been lay judges in the ordinary or administrative courts. Jury members must be Swedish citizens and resident in the county in which the case is being heard, they must be of sound judgement and known for their independence and integrity, and combined, they should represent a range of social groups and opinions, as well as all parts of the county. From this pool of available jurymen the court hears and excludes those with conflicts of interest in the case, after which the defendants and plaintiffs have the right to exclude a number of members, varying by county and group. The final jury is then randomly selected by drawing of lots.

The European Court of Human Rights has in a few cases determined that the outcome of such "random" selections of juries or court members may cause violations of the convention of human rights if the resulting selection of jury does not appear to be impartial or independent from the parties of the case or the matter.

== Legal education ==
Legal education in Sweden results in a master of law degree after about 4–5 years of study. Sweden has several law schools:

- Uppsala University
- Lund University
- Stockholm University
- University of Gothenburg
- Umeå University
- Örebro University
- Karlstad University

The government is the principal employer of law school graduates. Compared with other countries, the number of attorneys in private practice is small. There are about 100 law professors in Sweden.

== Law enforcement ==
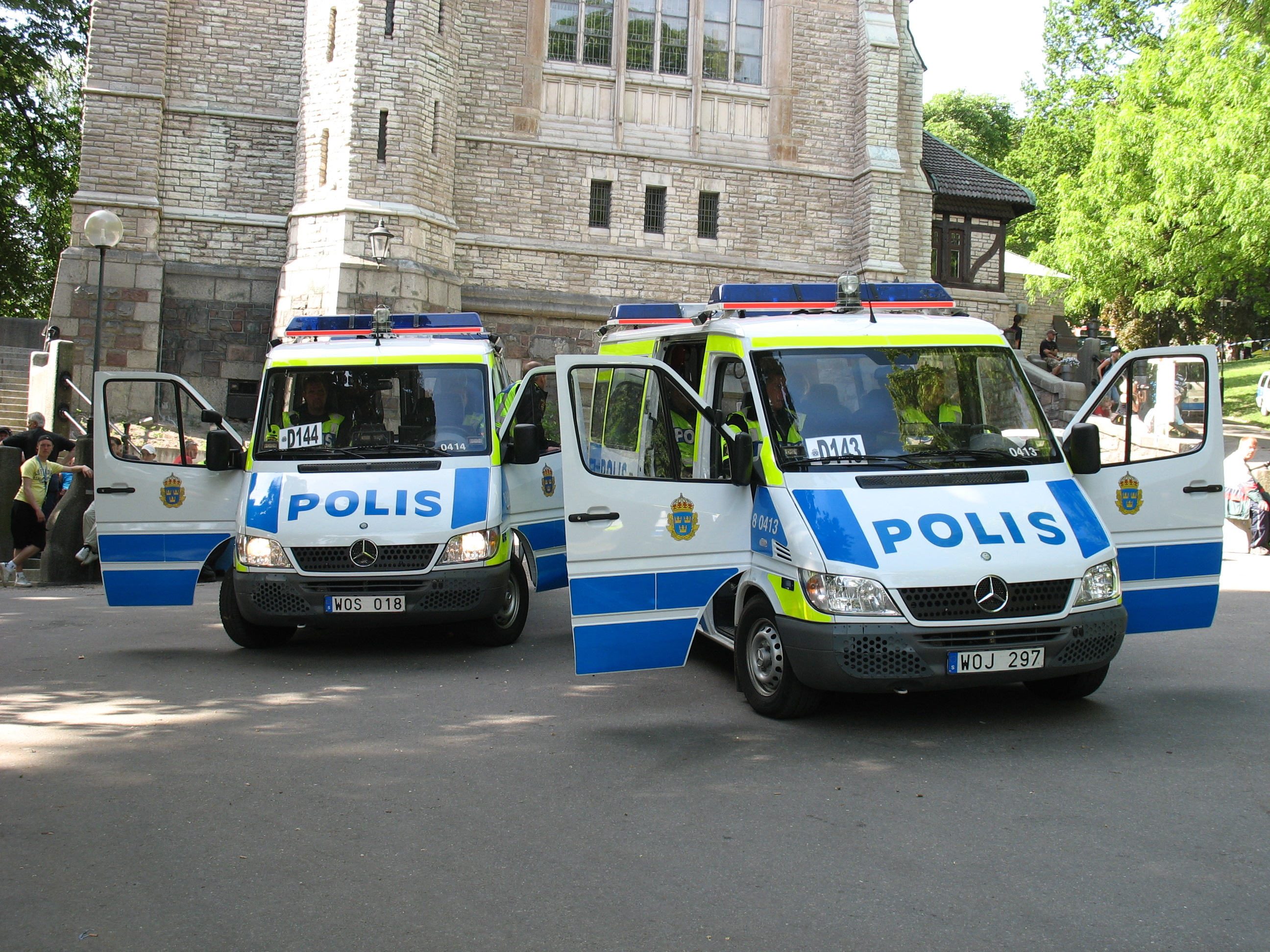
Two Swedish police vans

The Ministry of Justice, a cabinet-level department in the government of Sweden headed by the Minister of Justice, is primarily concerned with legislation concerning law enforcement. The main body for law enforcement in Sweden is the Swedish Police Authority. The Prison and Probation Service is the government agency handling prisons in Sweden.

== See also ==
- Häktning
- Law of Sweden
