= Linda Haggren =

Swedish jurist

Linda Haggren (born 8 September 1966) is a Swedish jurist and civil servant. She is a justice of Sweden's Supreme Administrative Court since 2021 and serves as president of the Supreme Administrative Court since 2026.

== Biography ==
Haggren obtained her Master of Laws degree from Stockholm University in 1992. She served as a law clerk at Stockholm County Administrative Court from 1993 to 1995. She was appointed associate judge at the Administrative Court of Appeal in Stockholm in 2000. She was as judge referee at the Supreme Administrative Court from 2002 to 2005 and thereafter she served within the Ministry of Finance, where she became a legal adviser in 2005, a senior legal adviser in 2008, and a director-general-level adviser in 2013, and ultimately served as director-general for Taxation and Customs and head of the Tax and Customs Department from 2014 to 2021. In 2021, Haggren was appointed a Justice of the Supreme Administrative Court and took up her post on 1 September 2021. She has been the President of the Court since 1 January 2026.

Legal offices
Preceded by Helena Jäderblom	President of the Supreme Administrative Court of Sweden; 2026–	Succeeded by Incumbent
