= Swedish National Board of Institutional Care =

The Swedish National Board of Institutional Care (Swedish: Statens institutionsstyrelse, SiS) is a Swedish government agency organized under the Ministry of Health and Social Affairs. The agency arrange compulsory care for young people with psychosocial problems and for adults suffering from substance abuse problems. SiS offers a number of different treatment plans and mandatory care, when voluntary intervention have failed, and the right to forcibly detain and isolate individuals has become necessary. Decisions regarding compulsory care is made by the administrative court, on the application of social services.

SiS runs residential homes for young people with psychosocial problems, suffering from substance abuse problems, or having committed crimes, under the terms of the Care of Young Persons Special Provisions Act (abbreviated LVU) and the Secure Youth Care Act (LSU). SiS also operates homes for adults with alcohol abuse problems, substance abuse problems, or a combination of these under the Care of Substance Abusers Special Provisions Act (LVM).

== Residential homes for young people ==
About 1,300 children and young people each year are placed at one of SiS's residential homes for young people, under the terms of LVU. The average time spent in these homes are around five months, and just over half are discharged within three months. Everyone is given a treatment plan based on their individual needs and circumstances, and treatment is planned together with the patient, family and social services. The most common therapeutic approach is cognitive behavioural therapy. Methods of treatment include: Aggression Replacement Training, Relapse Prevention, Motivational Interviewing and individual psychotherapy.

== Secure youth care ==
Young people between the ages of 15 and 17, who commit serious criminal offences such as robbery, aggravated assault, rape, manslaughter or murder can be sentenced to a high-security youth care unit, managed by the SiS. As treatment progresses the person is moved to more open units, and aftercare is the responsibility of social services.

== Homes for adults with substance misuse ==
Approximately one thousand adults with serious substance abuse problems are taken into care each year, and admitted to one of SiS homes for people with substance misuse problems, under the terms of LVM. Compulsory care is limited to a maximum of six months. During that time, the client is detoxified, receives care and medical treatment. The methods of treatment vary from patient to patient. Motivational Interviewing, Relapse Prevention, the Community Reinforcement Approach and 12-Step programmes are the most common methods.

== See also ==
- Crime in Sweden
- Swedish Prison and Probation Service

== Notes ==
1. SFS 1990:52 and SFS 1998:641
2. 1988:870
