= Swedish Act of Succession =

1810 Swedish constitutional law regulating the royal line of succession

Successionsordningen
- Swedish Code of Statutes

Riksdag of the Estates
- Long title: 1810 års successionsordning
- Citation: Successonsordning (1810:0926)
- Territorial extent: Sweden; Norway (1814–1905)
- Enacted by: Riksdag of the Estates
- Enacted: 26 September 1810
- Assented to: 26 September 1810

Amended by
- 1921:21; 1937:40; 1949:111; 1965:45; 1974:154; 1979:935

Keywords
- Constitution of Sweden; Monarchy of Sweden

The 1810 Act of Succession (Swedish: 1810 års successionsordning, lit. 'the 1810 order of succession') is one of four Fundamental Laws of the Realm (rikets grundlagar) and thus forms part of the Swedish Constitution. The Act regulates the line of succession to the Swedish throne and the conditions which eligible members of the Swedish royal family must abide by in order to remain in it.

It was jointly adopted by the Riksdag of the Estates, convened in Örebro on 26 September 1810, and Charles XIII, as a logical consequence following the election on 21 August of Jean Baptiste Bernadotte as Crown Prince.

The actual contents of the Act, save the solemn preamble, has been thoroughly rewritten over the years: the most notable change occurred in 1980 when the core principle of agnatic primogeniture (male succession only) was changed in favor of absolute primogeniture (eldest child regardless of sex).

== Historical background ==
The Act of Succession was adopted by the Riksdag of the Estates assembled at Örebro in 1810, upon electing Charles XIV John (Jean-Baptiste Bernadotte) as the heir to King Charles XIII. This happened at a tumultuous time for Sweden, as only one year earlier the former king, Gustav IV Adolf (and his sons) had been deposed and replaced by his childless uncle, Charles XIII. At the same time the Finnish War was coming to an end and Finland, then a part of Sweden proper, was held by Russia. The authoritarian constitution of 1772 was abolished and power was returned to parliament by the new Instrument of Government adopted on 6 June 1809. From 1814 to 1905 the Act of Succession also regulated succession to the Norwegian throne, due to the union of Sweden-Norway.

== Provisions ==
The act in the current version specifies that:

- Only children born in wedlock may inherit the Throne.
- Only the descendants of Carl XVI Gustaf may inherit the Throne.
- A prince or princess in the line of succession shall belong to and profess the "pure evangelical faith", as defined in the Unaltered Augsburg Confession and the Uppsala Synod of 1593, i.e. by implication the Church of Sweden.
- The offspring of an approved marriage must be brought up within Sweden.
- A prince or princess may not marry and remain in the line of succession without having received consent, upon application of the Monarch, from the Government of Sweden.
- A prince or princess is also prevented from becoming monarch of another country, either by election or marriage, without the consent of the Monarch and the Government.

If any of these provisions are violated: all rights of succession for the person concerned and all descendants are lost.

== Changes ==
In its original version, the Act mandated that a Swedish prince could only marry into families deemed to be of equal rank, or forfeit for himself and his future descendants all dynastic rights. The key wording was a prohibition of marrying a "private man's daughter" (Swedish: enskild mans dotter), a term which in Swedish jurisprudence was understood to exclude all non-royal persons, including the aristocracy. In 1937 the statutory provision which in effect had required a spouse of royal birth was changed and the prohibition only extended to a "private Swedish man's daughter" (Swedish: enskild svensk mans dotter).

A total of five Swedish princes lost their style of HRH, title as Prince of Sweden, personal Ducal title, and all rights of succession to the throne because they violated the uncompromisable constitutional provision, regardless of whether the King-in-Council did consent or not: Oscar in 1888, Lennart in 1932, Sigvard in 1934, Carl in 1937 and Carl Johan in 1946. There is since 1980 no statutory limitation, based on either nationality or royal rank, on whom a prince or princess can marry, apart from the fact that permission must be granted.

In 1980, the rule of succession was changed from agnatic primogeniture to absolute primogeniture. This change in effect made Victoria (born 1977) heir apparent and Crown Princess, passing over her younger brother Prince Carl Philip (born 1979) who had been the heir apparent and Crown Prince for less than one year.

== See also ==
- 1809 Instrument of Government
- List of Swedish monarchs
- Monarchy of Sweden
