= Swedish Prison and Probation Service =

Swedish government agency

Swedish Prison and Probation Service logo.

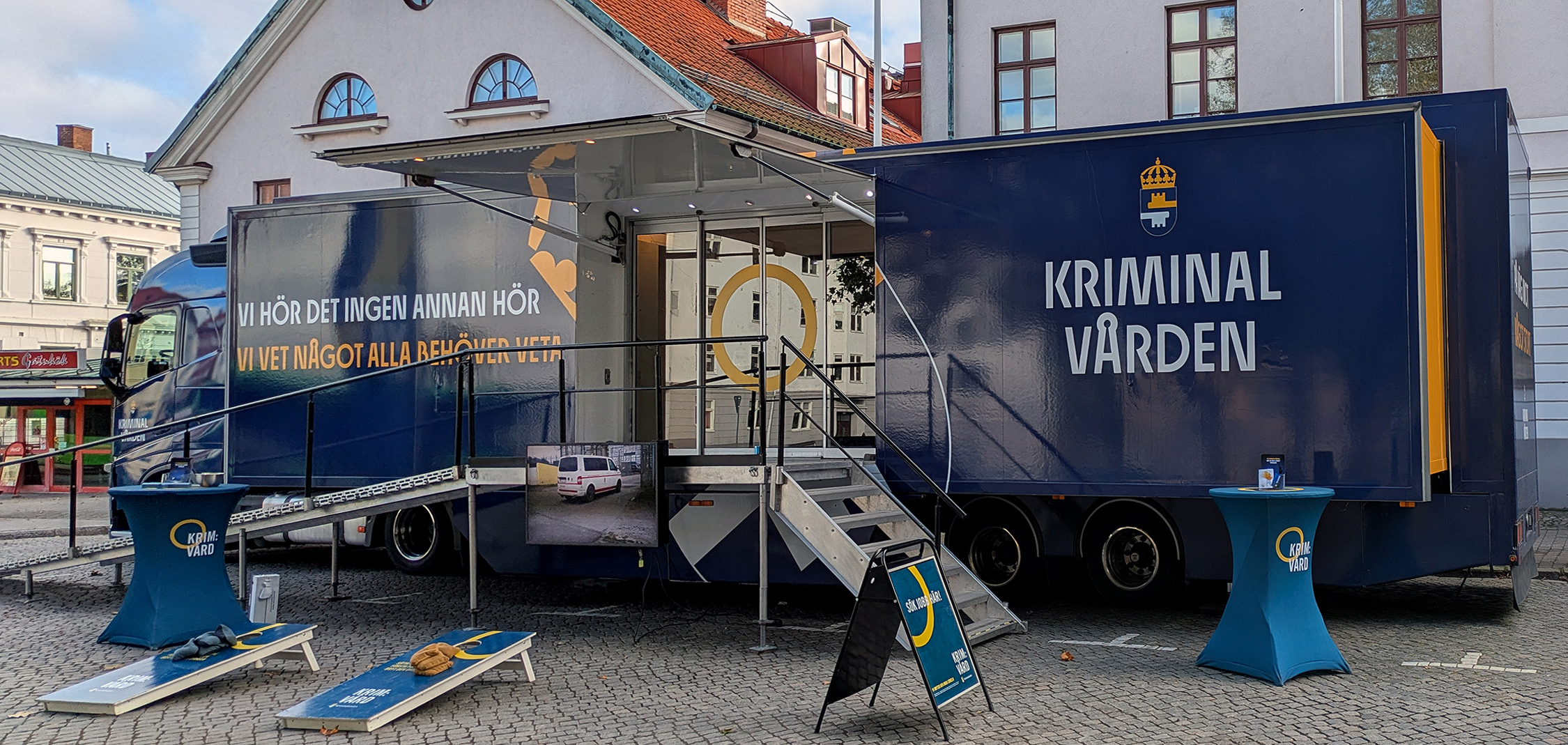
The Swedish Prison and Probation Service's recruitment bus visiting Ystad in 2025.

The Swedish Prison and Probation Service (Swedish: Kriminalvården) is a government agency that is part of the Swedish judicial system, tasked with incarcerating suspects during pre-trial and trial and convicts after sentencing. The Main Office of the agency is located in Norrköping.

The agency also handles deportations of individuals not allowed in the country. Due to the increase in Swedish prison populations, the agency announced it would consider sending incarcerated individuals to other countries as it aims to increase the number of prison spaces from 9,000 to 27,000 by 2033.

== History ==
The predecessor of today's agency was established on 3 February 1825 under the name Board of Prisons and Work Institutions in the Realm (Swedish: Styrelsen över fängelser och arbetsinrättningar i riket), with its headquarters at Långholmen, Stockholm. In 1859, it was renamed the National Swedish Prisons Board (Swedish: Fångvårdsstyrelsen) and in 1970 to the National Prison and Probation Administration (Swedish: Kriminalvårdsstyrelsen, KVS). In 2011, the agency changed its name to the Swedish Prison and Probation Service (Swedish: Kriminalvården).

== Directors-General ==
=== National Prisons Board ===
- February 1855 – May 1855: Louis de Geer (acting)
- 1855–1867: Wilhelm Stråle
- 1867–1885: Gustaf Fridolf Almquist
- 1885–1910: Sigfrid Wieselgren
- 1910–1927: Viktor Almquist
- 1927–1936: Gustaf Vilhelm Masreliez
- 1936–1960: Hardy Göransson
- 1960–1970: Torsten Eriksson

=== National Prison and Probation Administration ===
- 1970–1987: Bo Martinsson
- 1987–1987: Ulf Larsson
- 1987–1994: Björn Weibo
- 1994–2003: Bertel Österdahl
- 2003–2004: Lena Häll Eriksson
- 2004–2011: Lars Nylén

=== Prison and Probation Service ===
- 2011–2012: Inga Mellgren (acting)
- 2012–2019: Nils Öberg
- 2019–2020: Stefan Strömberg (acting)
- 2020–2026: Martin Holmgren
- 2026–2026: Peter Yngve (acting)
- 2026–xxxx: Rikard Jermsten

== See also ==
- Swedish National Board of Institutional Care
