= Instrument of Government (1634) =

Swedish constitution

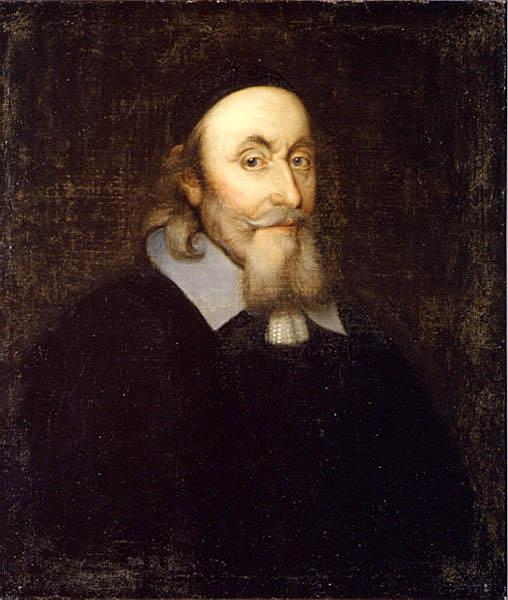
Axel Oxenstierna, Lord High Chancellor of Sweden and architect of the 1634 Instrument of Government.

The Instrument of Government (Swedish: regeringsform) of 1634 was a document describing the form and operation of the Swedish government, retrospectively regarded as the country's first constitution, although it was not intended to function as such. It was composed by the Lord High Chancellor, Axel Oxenstierna, and was adopted by the Riksdag of the Estates (Swedish Parliament) on 29 July 1634. It was rendered void when the Riksdag repudiated it in 1680.

== Background ==
After King Gustav II Adolf was killed at the Battle of Lützen (1632), the Swedish crown passed to his daughter, Christina. However, she was only five years old at the time, and so power was exercised in her name by the Council of the Realm. As the dominant figure on the Council was the Lord High Chancellor, Axel Oxenstierna, he therefore became the effective regent of Sweden. However, he was at the time out of the country, having been accompanying King Gustav on his campaigns in Germany, and he chose to remain in Mainz to direct military operations rather than returning to Sweden. Indeed, he did not come back to Sweden until 1636, and it was during this period of absence that he composed the Instrument of Government.

Oxenstierna's primary purpose in drawing up the 1634 Instrument was not to effect a major change in Sweden's form of government (as would be the case with the later Instruments of Government promulgated in 1719, 1772 and 1809), but rather to describe its existing structures and norms, and to clarify the division of responsibilities among different royal officials, in order to ensure that the regency government functioned smoothly in his absence.

== Description ==
The Instrument of Government was the first attempt to systematically describe and regulate the structures of Swedish government and administration, as well as the judiciary and the armed forces. It also instituted a number of reforms, such as decreeing that the number of members of the Council of the Realm, hitherto an ad hoc gathering of the king's advisors, was to be fixed at twenty-five (Article #5). It furthermore established that the Council was to be headed by the five Great Officers of the Realm; one of these was Oxenstierna himself (as Lord High Chancellor), while two others were kinsmen of his, namely his brother Gabriel Gustafsson Oxenstierna (as Lord High Steward) and their cousin Gabriel Bengtsson Oxenstierna (as Lord High Treasurer).

One of the Instrument's most important reforms, and certainly the one that has had the most pervasive effect upon Swedish life since 1634, was the introduction of a system of counties (Swedish: län) to replace the traditional provinces (Article #23). The counties have been rejigged several times in the centuries since, but remain the primary units of local government in Sweden to this day.

The Instrument largely ignored the role of the Crown in its description of the operation of the Swedish government, and indeed reassigned many functions which were usually discharged by the king to the Great Officers of the Realm instead. As Sven Nilsson says in his biography of Oxenstierna:

All this management is top-down. Not by the king, who in a peculiar way stands outside the hierarchy, but by the officials…In the system instituted by this Instrument of Government, there is no place for the personal rule that characterises Gustav Adolf's time. On the contrary, it creates an alternative to the autocratic royal state, an oligarchic bureaucratic state, where power rests with the Great Officers of the Realm.

— Sven A. Nilsson, Axel Oxenstierna in Svenskt Biografiskt Lexikon (1994), p. 504.

Obviously, this reflects in part the fact that the underage Queen Christina was incapable of taking an active role in government at the time the Instrument was written. However, it was intended from the beginning that the Instrument would apply not just during Christina’s minority but also after she came of age, and indeed during the reigns of subsequent monarchs. Oxenstierna stated as much in a letter of 5 December 1632, in which he described one purpose of the new document as being to ensure that “a wise king could be properly understood, and a foolish king not immediately deposed”, i.e. that it would enable royal officials to prevent a wayward monarch from taking unwise actions that might provoke revolt.

== Reception ==
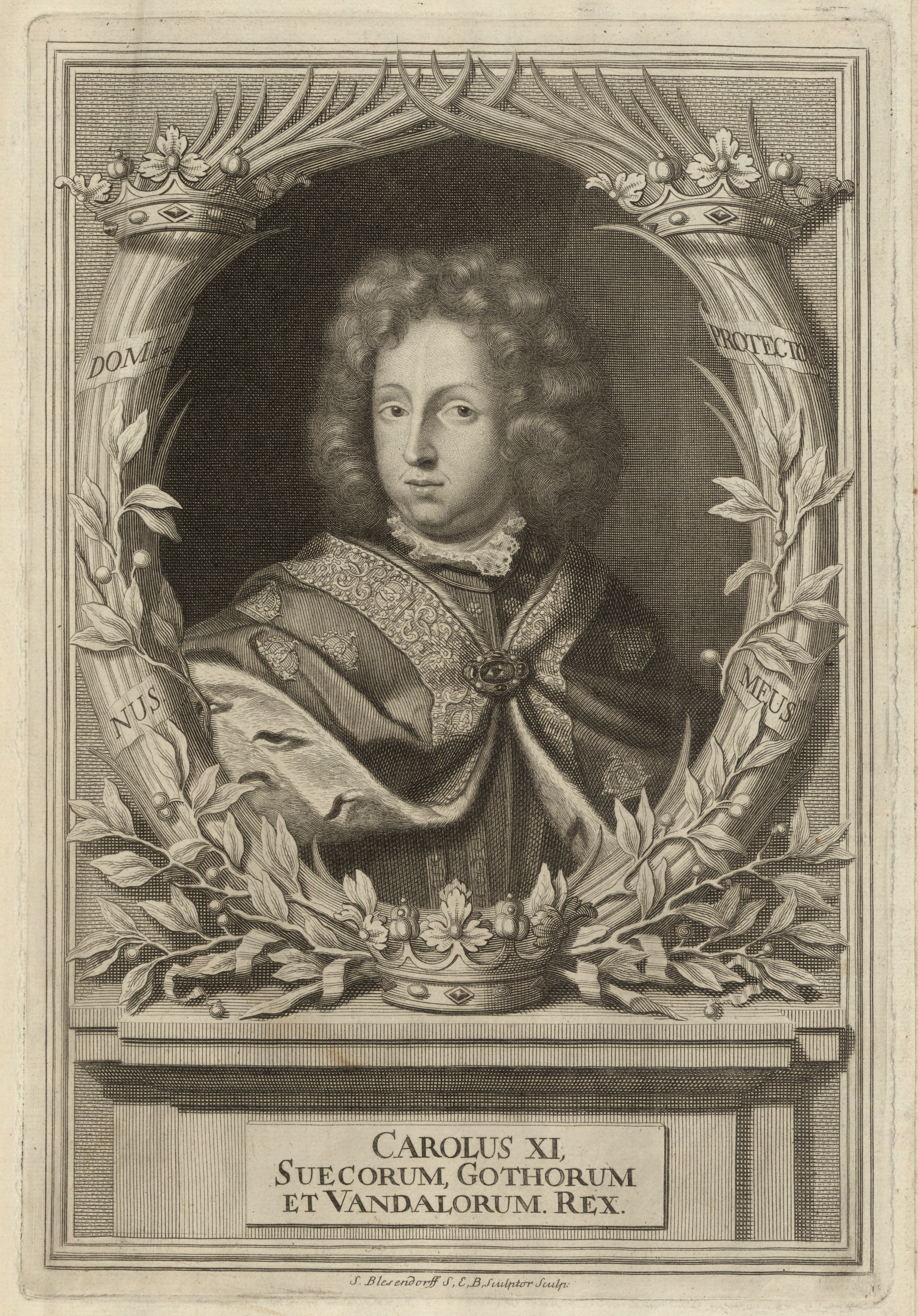
King Charles XI, who in 1680 persuaded the Riksdag to repudiate the Instrument of Government and accept an absolute monarchy.

The Instrument of Government was endorsed by the Riksdag of the Estates in July 1634 and subsequently applied across Sweden, although technically it did not have legal force as it was never formally confirmed by either Queen Christina or her successor King Charles X Gustav. Indeed, the latter strongly resented the restrictions it imposed upon his role in the government, and he used the Swedish defeat in the Dano-Swedish War (1658-1660) to argue that the current arrangement was inadequate. He therefore proposed to the 1660 session of the Riksdag that the Instrument be rewritten to give him greater freedom of action, but his efforts came to naught due to his sudden death in February of that year.

The Instrument thus remained in force de facto down to 1680, when Charles Gustav’s son Charles XI used the poor Swedish performance in another conflict, the Scanian War (1675-9), to revive his father’s argument that the only way to ensure the security of the Swedish Empire was by centralising power in the person of the monarch. The Riksdag was convinced, declaring on 1680 that the king "was not to be bound by any instrument of government, only by the laws of Sweden", thereby rendering the Instrument of Government void and establishing an absolute monarchy in Sweden for the first time.

Despite the introduction of absolutism, Charles XI continued to implicitly accept many of the limits on royal power laid out in the Instrument of Government. His son and successor Charles XII was less sensitive, especially toward the end of his reign, when the strains imposed by the Great Northern War led him to rule in an increasingly high-handed and autocratic fashion. His arbitrary interference in the business of government and his refusal to take advice from his officials led to mounting frustration with the absolutist system, and after the king's death in 1718 it was overthrown and replaced by a constitutional monarchy. The document drawn up to articulate the new system was inspired by the 1634 Instrument of Government, and was given the same title (see Instrument of Government (1719)), although it differed from its predecessor in that it was explicitly intended to function as a constitution.

== See also ==
- Axel Oxenstierna
- Charles XI of Sweden
- Instrument of Government (1719)

== Sources ==
- Åberg, Alf (1994). Karl XI (in Swedish) (New ed.). Stockholm: Wahlström & Widstrand. ISBN 91-46-16623-8. SELIBR 7282103.
