= Instrument of Government (1720) =

Swedish constitution

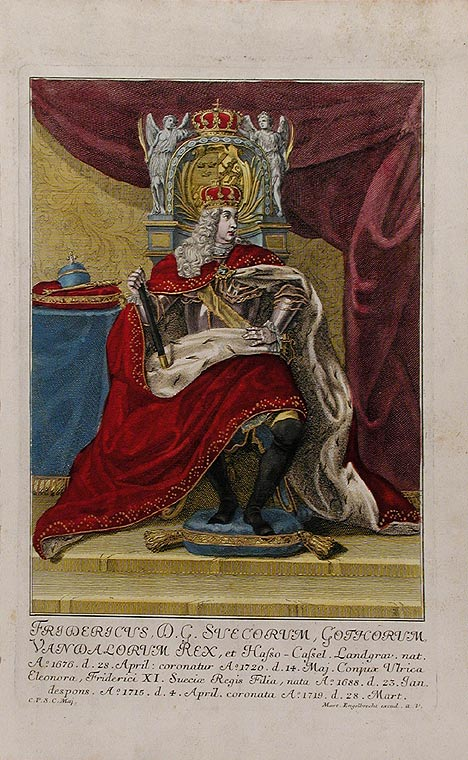
Frederick I of Sweden, in whose name the Instrument of Government was promulgated.

The 1720 Instrument of Government (Swedish: 1720 års regeringsform) adopted on 2 May 1720 by the Riksdag of the Estates (Swedish parliament), was the constitution of the Kingdom of Sweden from 1720 to 1772, and was thus in force for almost the entirety of the period of constitutional monarchy known as the Age of Liberty, having replaced the largely identical Instrument of Government (1719).

The decision to enact a new constitution so soon after the previous one was prompted by the decision of Queen Ulrika Eleonora to abdicate in favour of her husband Frederick of Hesse, who thus became King Frederick I. The Riksdag disapproved of this manoeuvre and suspected Frederick of having ambitions of restoring absolute monarchy, and so in exchange for ratifying his accession as king it forced him to accept a new constitution, which imposed tighter restrictions upon royal power than its predecessor. In most respects, however, the 1720 Instrument was identical to that of 1719.

The 1720 Instrument of Government remained in force for fifty years, before being replaced by the 1772 Instrument of Government, which ended the period of constitutionalism and restored absolutism in Sweden.

== Description ==
The 1719 and 1720 Instruments of Government replaced the Carolean absolute monarchy with a constitutional monarchy and a parliamentary system, where the king shared power with the Riksdag of the Estates. The Riksdag comprised four estates (the nobility, clergy, burghers and peasantry), each consisting of a number of representatives elected by members of the respective social groups. Women were granted limited suffrage, providing they were taxpaying guild members of legal majority. The executive functions of government were discharged by the Council of the Realm (Swedish: riksråd), which consisted of 16 members drawn from the first three estates of the Riksdag. The councillors were appointed by the Riksdag: each of the first three estates nominated three candidates for cabinet posts to the king, who was then allowed to select his preference from the three choices. The king was also permitted to participate in the council's decision-making, and although he had to vote on decisions like any other member of the council, his vote counted double that of the ordinary Councillors.

== Sources ==
- Lundh-Eriksson, Nanna (1976). Den glömda drottningen: Karl XII:s syster Ulrika Eleonora d.y. och henes tid [The Forgotten Queen: The Sister of Charles XII. The Age of Ulrika Eleonora the Younger] (in Swedish). [Stockholm]: [Förf.] ISBN 91-970128-1-5. SELIBR 7790483.
- Hedenborg, Susanna; Kvarnström, Lars, eds. (2009). Det svenska samhället 1720-2006: böndernas och arbetarnas tid (in Swedish) (3rd ed.). Lund: Studentlitteratur. ISBN 9789144053295. SELIBR 11360799.
