= Administrative courts in Sweden =

Civilian lawcourt in Sweden

The administrative courts in Sweden (Swedish: förvaltningsrätt) are the court of first instance for the general administrative courts in Sweden. The next instance are the administrative courts of appeal (Swedish: kammarrätt). The administrative courts handle numerous types of cases relating to disputes between private persons and the authorities. There are 12 administrative courts spread across Sweden.

== Types of cases ==
Coat of arms of the administrative court of Falun

Coat of arms of the administrative court of Luleå

Over 500 different kinds of cases are assigned to the administrative courts. For example:

- Cases concerning the compulsory care for young people.
- Cases concerning adults with substance misuse problems.
- All decisions made by a municipality or county council can be appealed, under the Local Government Act.
- Cases involving the social services in a municipality, on issues like welfare, under the Social Services Act.
- Decisions made by the Swedish Tax Agency, regarding income tax, property taxes or a VAT decision, etc.
- Cases concerning psychiatric care, under the terms of Compulsory Psychiatric Care Act and the Forensic Psychiatric Care Act.
- Decisions made by the Swedish Social Insurance Agency. This includes sick pay, compensation for occupational injuries, and more.

Other common cases are: driving licence revocation, alcohol licensing, animal welfare issues, appeals on public procurement decisions and agricultural subsidies.

=== Migration Courts ===
Decisions made by the Swedish Migration Agency, on issues like deportation or refusal of entry, can be appealed at the Migration Courts, which are located at four of Sweden's administrative courts: Stockholm, Malmö, Gothenburg and Luleå. Decisions made by these courts can be appealed at the Migration Court of Appeal, which is located at the Administrative Court of Appeal in Stockholm.

== Organization ==
Sweden is divided into 12 court districts (Swedish: domkrets) for the administrative courts, as prescribed by the government (SFS 1977:937). In the administrative courts, a judge other than the president of a court or a division of a court is simply titled Judge (Swedish: rådman). A judge who presides over a division is titled Senior Judge (Swedish: chefsrådman), and the head official of the administrative court is titled Chief Judge (Swedish: lagman). The administrative courts have approximately 1,500 employees. About 220 of these are employed as judges. There are also lay judges (Swedish: nämndeman) linked to the administrative court. Lay judges are laymen, not legally qualified representatives of the people, appointed by the county councils, serving four years.

Permanent salaried judges (Swedish: ordinarie domare) are appointed by the Government. Special provisions apply for the selection of judges and their dismissal, to guarantee the independence of the court, making them almost impossible to fire.

In most cases, the bench constitutes a quorum with one legally qualified judge and three lay judges. However, some simpler cases may be decided on without any lay judges, and in more complicated cases the lay judges may be replaced by specially appointed experts.

== Appeal ==
With the exception of tax cases, cases concerning the compulsory care for young people or adults with substance misuse problems, and people who are mentally ill, a leave to appeal is required for the next instance to hear a case. This means that the Administrative Court of Appeal needs to grant an appeal, and this is only done if there's reason to believe the court's decision might be changed, or set an important precedent in a higher court.

== List and map of general administrative courts ==
Administrative Court of Appeal in Sundsvall
- Falun
- Härnösand
- Luleå
- Umeå
Administrative Court of Appeal in Gothenburg
- Gothenburg
- Karlstad
- Malmö
Administrative Court of Appeal in Stockholm
- Stockholm
- Uppsala
Administrative Court of Appeal in Jönköping
- Jönköping
- Linköping
- Växjö

thunb

The clickable map shows geographic boundaries of the administrative courts of appeal and the lower courts.

== Note ==
1. LVU (SFS 1990:52) and LVM (SFS 1988:870). See also the page on Swedish National Board of Institutional Care.
2. SFS 1991:1128, SFS: 1991:1129
3. 1991:900 - An old translation to English can be found here.
4. 2001:453
5. Described in the Instrument of Government (1974), Chapter 11, Articles 6 and 7. The Letters Patent Act (SFS 1994:261) governs the dismissal of judges.
6. Map of administrative courts on the official website of the Swedish National Courts Administration and SFS 1977:937.
