= Instrument of Government (1719) =

Swedish constitution

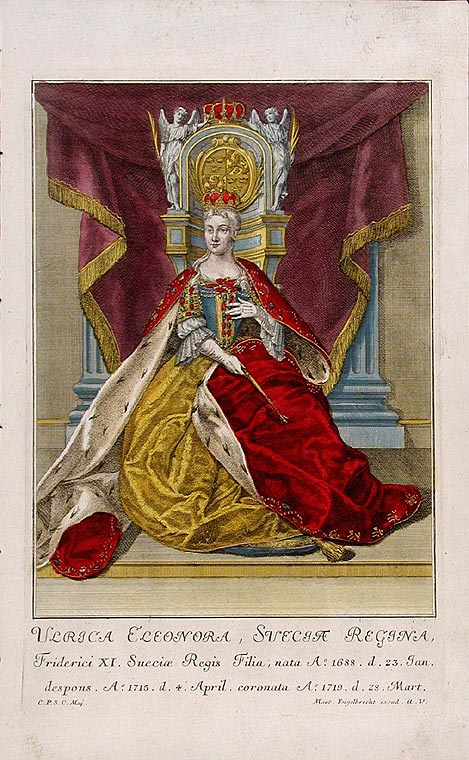
Queen Ulrika Eleonora, in whose name the Instrument of Government was promulgated.

The 1719 Instrument of Government (Swedish: regeringsform) adopted on 21 February 1719 by the Riksdag of the Estates (Swedish parliament), was the constitution of the Kingdom of Sweden from 1719 to 1720. Although only in force for a few months, it has great significance in Swedish history, as its promulgation marked the end of the country's first period of absolutism (1680-1719) and the beginning of the period of constitutional monarchy and parliamentary government traditionally known as the Age of Liberty.

The Instrument came about as a result of the succession crisis which occurred after Charles XII of Sweden died childless during the Great Northern War, leaving two potential heirs: his sister Ulrika Eleonora the Younger, and his nephew Charles Frederick, Duke of Holstein-Gottorp. The crisis was eventually resolved by a deal whereby the Riksdag acknowledged Ulrika as queen regnant, and in exchange she signed a new constitution, thereby renouncing the absolute monarchy instituted by her father King Charles XI. As such it was in effect a revival of the Instrument of Government (1634), and indeed the title "Instrument of Government" (Swedish: regeringsform) was deliberately chosen to invoke that earlier document; there are however substantial differences between the two, with the 1634 Instrument having a more narrowly descriptive and administrative function while the 1719 Instrument was explicitly intended to be a political constitution in the modern sense.

Only a year after its promulgation, the 1719 Instrument of Government was replaced by a new constitution, the 1720 Instrument of Government, although the two were largely identical in content. The 1720 Instrument subsequently remained in force for the rest of the Age of Liberty, until absolutism was restored by King Gustav III's self-coup in 1772.

== Sources ==
- Lundh-Eriksson, Nanna (1976). Den glömda drottningen: Karl XII:s syster Ulrika Eleonora d.y. och henes tid [The Forgotten Queen: The Sister of Charles XII. The Age of Ulrika Eleonora the Younger] (in Swedish). [Stockholm]: [Förf.] ISBN 91-970128-1-5. SELIBR 7790483.
- Hedenborg, Susanna; Kvarnström, Lars, eds. (2009). Det svenska samhället 1720-2006: böndernas och arbetarnas tid (in Swedish) (3rd ed.). Lund: Studentlitteratur. ISBN 9789144053295. SELIBR 11360799.
