= Supreme Administrative Court of Sweden =

Supreme court of Sweden

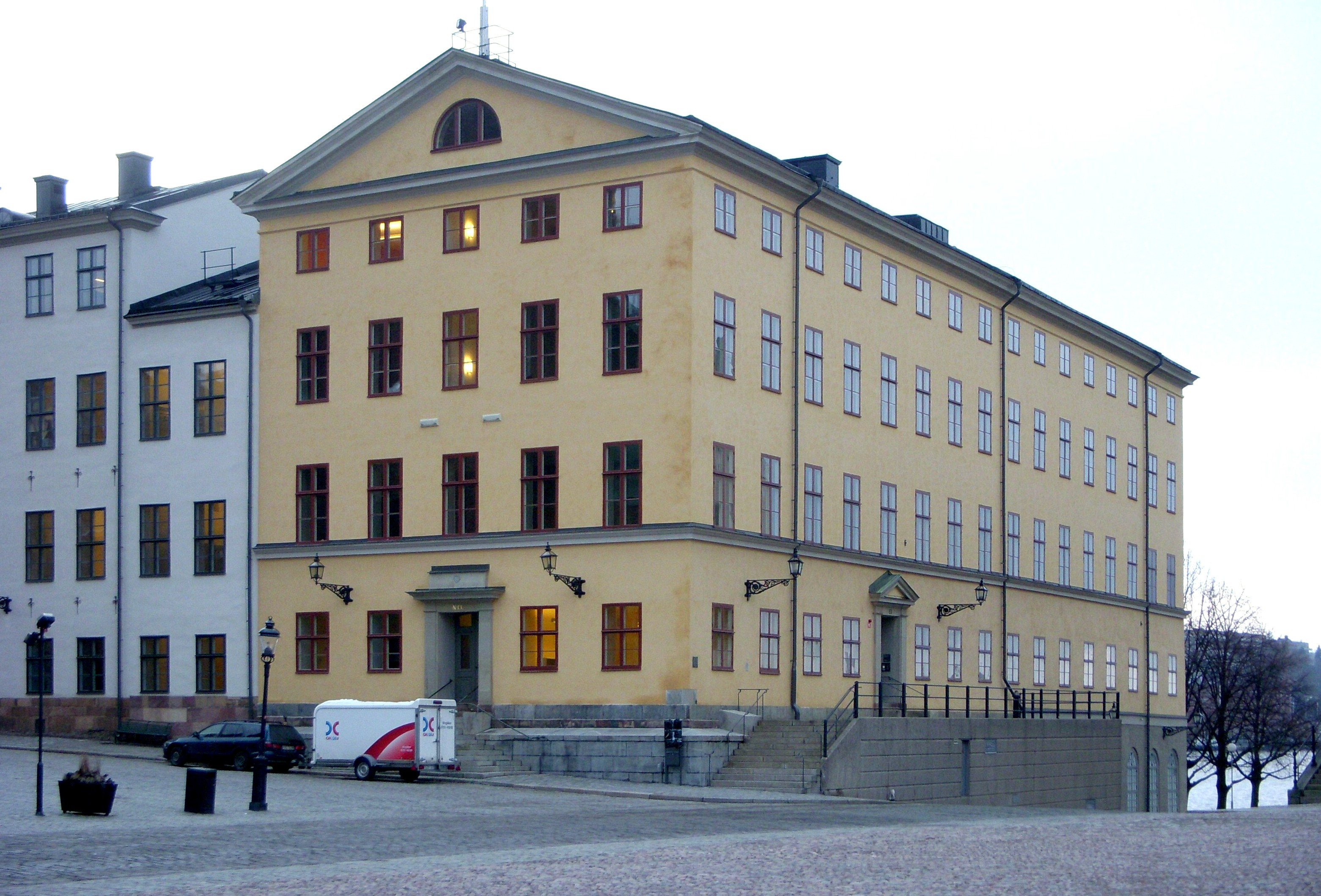
Kammarrättens hus (yellow) and the Sparre Palace (white) is the seat of the Supreme Administrative Court of Sweden.

The Supreme Administrative Court of Sweden (Swedish: Högsta förvaltningsdomstolen, before 2011 Regeringsrätten, acronym RR or RegR) is the supreme court and the third and final tier for administrative court cases in Sweden, and is located in Stockholm. It has a parallel status to that of the Supreme Court of Sweden (Högsta domstolen), which is the supreme court for criminal and civil law cases.

It hears cases which have been decided by one of the four Administrative courts of appeal, which represent the second tier for administrative court cases in Sweden. Before a case can be decided, a leave to appeal must be obtained, which is typically only granted when the case is of interest as a precedent. The bulk of its caseload consist of taxation and social security cases.

Justices of the Supreme Administrative Court (Swedish: justitieråd) are appointed by government, but the court as an institution is independent of the Riksdag, and the government is not able to interfere with the decisions of the court. By law, there shall be fourteen Justices of the Supreme Administrative Court or such a higher a number as may be required, at the government's discretion. As of 2009, there were eighteen Justices in the court. One of the Justices serves as president and head of the court, and is appointed by the government to this function.

Since 2026, justice Linda Haggren serves as the court's president. In total the court has approximately 100 employees.

== History ==
The court was founded in 1909. Before that, the Supreme Court of Sweden handed administrative court matters as well. From 1972 until 2009, the Supreme Administrative Court resided in the Stenbock Palace on the Riddarholmen islet in central Stockholm. Since 2011 the court sits in Kammarrättens hus (the former Administrative Court of Appeal Building) and the Sparre Palace on Riddarholmen.

== Current composition ==
The current Councillors of Justice (Swedish: justitieråd) of the Supreme Court of Sweden, followed by year of appointment:

- Linda Haggren, Chairman (2021, Chairman since 2026)
- Henrik Jermsten, Chairman of Chamber (2006, Chairman of Chamber since 2012)
- Margit Knutsson (2005)
- Kristina Ståhl (2008)
- Per Classon (2014)
- Inga-Lill Askersjö (2014)
- Mahmut Baran (2014)
- Leif Gäverth (2015)
- Ulrik von Essen (2017)
- Marie Jönsson (2020)
- Magnus Medin (2022)
- Martin Nilsson (2022)
- Mikael Westberg (2025)
- Mathias Säfsten (2025)
- Karin Attorps (2025)
- Johanna Mihaic (2025)

== Presidents of the Supreme Administrative Court of Sweden ==
Originally, there were no regulations on the presidency of the Supreme Administrative Court. According to practice, the senior member of the post served as chair when the court met in plenary session, and the second oldest served as department chair. In its report of 1966, the Administrative Court Committee (Förvaltningsdomstolskommittén) proposed a new order, in which the President of the Supreme Administrative Court (as well as the chair of a section of the Supreme Administrative Court) was appointed by the King in Council. This became a reality in the Administrative Process Reform (Förvaltningsprocessreformen) in 1972. In the Supreme Court, the corresponding reform had been implemented in 1946.

- 1972–1972: Nils Lorichs
- 1972–1975: Olov Hegrelius
- 1975–1980: Carl Åbjörnsson
- 1980–1987: Bengt Wieslander
- 1987–1990: Bengt Hamdahl
- 1990–1994: Magnus Sjöberg
- 1994–1996: Göran Wahlgren
- 1996–2000: Gunnar Björne
- 2000–2005: Hans Ragnemalm
- 2005–2007: Rune Lavin
- 2007–2010: Sten Heckscher
- 2011–2018: Mats Melin
- 2018–2025: Helena Jäderblom
- 2026–present: Linda Haggren
