= Basic Laws of Sweden =

Constitutional law of Sweden

The Basic Laws of Sweden (Swedish: Sveriges grundlagar) are the four constitutional laws of the Kingdom of Sweden that regulate the Swedish political system, acting in a similar manner to the constitutions of most countries.

These four laws are: the Instrument of Government (Swedish: Regeringsformen), the Freedom of the Press Act (Swedish: Tryckfrihetsförordningen), the Fundamental Law on Freedom of Expression (Swedish: Yttrandefrihetsgrundlagen) and the Act of Succession (Swedish: Successionsordningen). Together, they constitute a basic framework that stands above other laws and regulations, and also define which agreements are themselves above normal Swedish law.

The Parliament Act (Swedish: Riksdagsordningen) is usually considered to be halfway between a fundamental law and a normal law, with certain main chapters afforded similar protections as the fundamental laws while other additional chapters require only a simple parliamentary majority in order to be amended.

To amend or to revise a fundamental law, the Riksdag needs to approve the changes twice in two successive terms with simple majorities, with a general election having been held in between. The first vote can be supplemented with a referendum.

== Instrument of Government ==
The most important of the fundamental laws is the Instrument of Government (Swedish: regeringsformen, RF). It sets out the basic principles for political life in Sweden defining rights and freedoms.

The 1974 Instrument of Government grants the power to commission a prime minister to the Riksdag, at the nomination of the Speaker of the Riksdag, who following a vote in the Riksdag signs the letter of commission on behalf of the Riksdag. The prime minister is appointed when the majority of the Riksdag does not vote against the nominee, thus making it possible to form minority governments. The prime minister appoints members of the government, including heads of ministries. The government collectively decides on issues after hearing the report of the head of the ministry concerned. At least five members of the government need to be present for a decisional quorum to be made. In practice, reports are written and discussions are very rare during formal cabinet meetings.

Constitutional functions for the head of state, i.e., the monarch, include heading the cabinet councils (the king plus the members of the government), heading the Council on Foreign Affairs, recognizing new cabinets (in the Council of State), and opening the annual session of the Riksdag. The monarch is to be continually briefed on governmental issues—in the Council of State or directly by the prime minister.

The first constitutional Instrument of Government was enacted in 1719, marking the transition from autocracy to parliamentarism. Sweden's bloodless coup d'état of 1772 was legitimized by the Riksdag of the Estates in new versions of the Instrument of Government, Swedish Constitution of 1772 and the Union and Security Act from 1789, making the king a "constitutional autocrat". When the ancient Swedish land in 1809 was split into two parts, and the Grand Duchy of Finland was created as an autonomous part of the Russian Empire, this constitutional autocracy was not formally abolished or replaced. Finland gained independence as a republic in 1917, and its parliament used the Swedish Constitution of 1772 as legal basis to operate until the country adopted its new constitution in 1919.

In Sweden, the loss of virtually half the realm led to another bloodless revolution, a new royal dynasty, and the Instrument of Government of 6 June 1809 (as well as a new Freedom of Press Act and Act of Succession). The new Instrument of Government established a separation of powers between the executive branch (the king) and the legislative branch (the Riksdag of the Estates) and gave the king and the Riksdag of the Estates joint power over legislation, with the king still playing a central role in government but no longer independently of the Privy Council. The king was free to choose councillors, but was bound to decide on governmental matters only in presence of the Privy Council, or a subset thereof, and after report of the councillor responsible for the matter in question. The councillor had to countersign a royal decision, unless it was unconstitutional, whereby it gained legal force. The councillor was legally responsible for his advice and was obliged to note his dissension in case he did not agree with the king's decision. This constitution placed considerable de jure power in the king, but it was increasingly exercised in accordance with his councillors' advice. From 1917, the king adhered to principles of parliamentarism by choosing councillors possessing direct or indirect support from a majority of the Riksdag.

After over fifty years of de facto parliamentarism, it was written into the Instrument of Government of 1974, which, although technically adherent to constitutional monarchy, created the Government of Sweden in its present constitutional form.

=== Amendment of 2009 ===
In 2009, the Riksdag approved Proposition 2009/10:80, "A Reformed Constitution" (Swedish: En reformerad grundlag), making substantial amendments to the Instrument of Government, and related acts.

The amendment modernized and simplified the text in general, and strengthened several fundamental rights and freedoms. Protection against unfair discrimination was extended to include discrimination based on sexual orientation. The amendment affirmed the responsibility of public authorities to protect children's rights, and to promote the preservation and development of ethnic minorities' culture and language, making special mention of the Sami people. It also strengthens judicial powers to make it easier to determine whether new laws contravene the constitution or the Charter of Fundamental Rights of the European Union.

These amendments took effect on 1 January 2011.

== Freedom of the press and freedom of expression ==
The other two acts define the freedom of the press and other forms of expression. They are separated into two separate laws mainly to maintain the tradition of the Freedom of the Press Act from 1766, largely the work of proto-Liberal Cap Party politician Anders Chydenius, which abolished censorship and restricted limitations to retroactive legal measures for criticism of the Lutheran state church and the royal house exclusively.

The Freedom of the Press Act (Swedish: Tryckfrihetsförordningen, TF) was changed several times since its first incarnation; following Gustav III's coup d'etat in 1772, the Act was amended in order to curtail freedom of the press, but restored in 1810 following the overthrow of his son, and later amended to ensure this fact in 1812, 1949 and 1982. The option to revoke publishing licenses was retained until the late rule of Charles XIV John and used widely against Liberal papers such as Aftonbladet, which saw its license revoked ten times in 1838 alone. Publisher Lars Johan Hierta solved this by adding a different numeral to the name Aftonbladet, thus publishing a formally different newspaper. The right to revoke was finally abolished in 1844. The 1766 Act held for example that freedom of expression was to be uninhibited, except for "violations", which included blasphemy and criticism of the state.

The Fundamental Law on Freedom of Expression (Swedish: Yttrandefrihetsgrundlagen, YGL) of 1991 is a lengthier document defining freedom of expression in all media except for written books and magazines (such as radio, television, the Internet, etc.)

=== Principle of Public Access ===
In the 18th century, after over 40 years of mixed experiences with parliamentarism, public access to public documents was one of the main issues with the Freedom of the Press Act of 1766. Although the novelty was put out of order 1772–1809, it has since remained central in the Swedish mindset, seen as a forceful means against corruption and government agencies' unequal treatment of the citizens, increasing the perceived legitimacy of (local and central) government and politicians. The Principle of Public Access (Swedish: Offentlighetsprincipen), as the collection of rules is commonly referred to, provides that all information and documents created or received by a "public authority" (local or central government, and all publicly operated establishments) must be available to all members of the public. It also states that all public authorities must provide information promptly (skyndsamt) upon request.

Exemptions from the right to access to public documents are defined in the Public Access to Information and Secrecy Act (Offentlighets- och sekretesslagen) which succeeded the Secrecy Act (Sekretesslagen) in 2009. The act details which information government agencies can keep secret, under what circumstances, and towards whom. According to the Chapter 2, Article 2 of the Freedom of the Press Act: "The right of access to official documents may be restricted only if restriction is necessary having regard to

- the security of the Realm or its relations with a foreign state or an international organization;
- the central finance policy, monetary policy, or foreign exchange policy of the Realm;
- the inspection, control or other supervisory activities of a public authority;
- the interest of preventing or prosecuting crime;
- the public economic interest;
- the protection of the personal integrity or economic conditions of private subjects;
- the preservation of animal or plant species."

This list is exhaustive and the Parliament may not legislate about restrictions outside the scope of this list, and any restrictions have to be legislated into the Public Access to Information and Secrecy Act previously mentioned.

Secrecy is limited to a maximum time of 70 years (when relating to individuals that is 70 years after the person's death).

== Act of Succession ==
Sweden's switch from elective to hereditary monarchy in 1544 gave reason to Sweden's first law of constitutional character, in form of a treaty between the royal dynasty and the realm represented by the four Estates to be valid for all times.

Accordingly, the current 1810 Act of Succession (Swedish: Successionsordningen, SO) is a treaty between the old Riksdag of the Estates and the House of Bernadotte regulating the right to accede to the Swedish throne. In 1980, the old principle of agnatic primogeniture, which meant that the throne was inherited by the eldest male child of the preceding monarch, was replaced by the principle of absolute primogeniture. This meant that the throne will be inherited by the eldest child without regard to sex. Thereby Princess Victoria, the eldest child of King Carl XVI Gustaf of Sweden, was created heiress apparent to the Swedish throne over her younger brother, until then Crown Prince Carl Philip.

== Former Lutheran state church ==
In 1593, after 70 years of Reformation and Counter-Reformation in Sweden, adherence to the Augsburg Confession was decided and given constitutional status at the Synod of Uppsala (Swedish: Uppsala möte). References to Uppsala Synod have since then been worked into the fundamental laws, notably the Act of Succession.

In 2000, the Church was separated from the state and became an independent organization, but the ruling body of the church is still decided by public voting (among members of the church), and mostly consists of the political parties. The Church of Sweden is often classified as a semi-state church. This is because of its formal separation from the state but its lasting ties with official Sweden, most notably the Riksdag and the monarch. The Church of Sweden is also the only religious organization regulated by its own law, the Church of Sweden Act, which stipulates that the Church of Sweden has to be a democratic, Lutheran, Folk church. As a result of the separation, people born in Sweden where the parents are members of the Church of Sweden since 2000 no longer become members of the church automatically at birth.

== Amendments ==
Amendments of the fundamental laws must be adopted twice by the Riksdag with a simple majority of the votes cast, with intervening elections. Within 15 days of an amendment's first enactment, at least one-tenth of all MPs may bring a motion for a referendum which must be supported by at least one-third of all MPs. The referendum is held simultaneously with Riksdag elections and the amendment is deemed rejected if a simple majority of voters reject it, provided the majority is a majority of all valid votes. If the people do not dismiss a change, it still has to be ratified by the newly elected Riksdag. Such a referendum has never been used.

== See also ==
- Instrument of Government (1634)
- Instrument of Government (1719)
- Instrument of Government (1720)
- Instrument of Government (1772)
- Instrument of Government (1809)
- Law of Sweden
