= Law of Sweden =

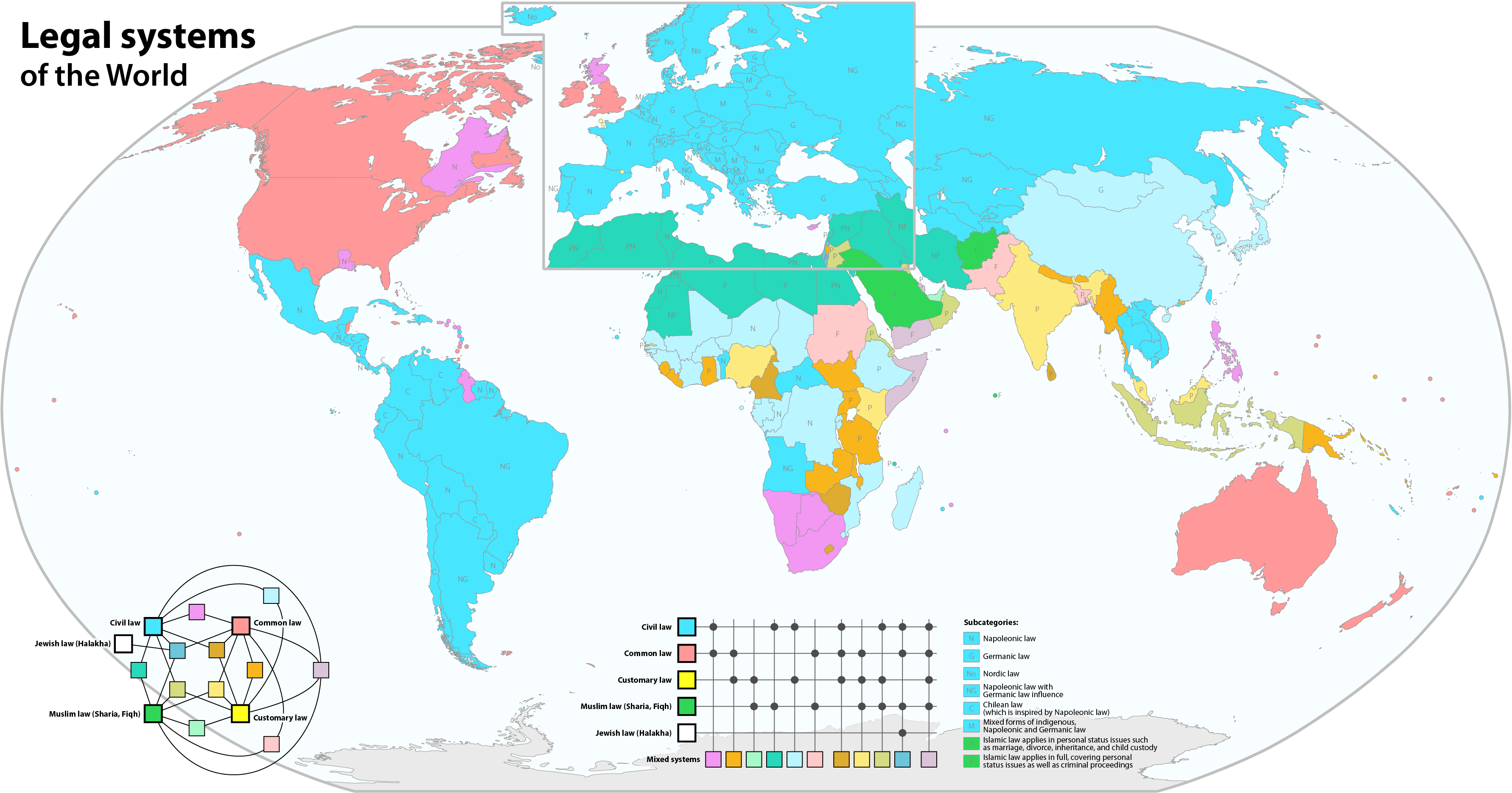
Legal systems of the world.

The law of Sweden is a civil law system, whose essence is manifested in its dependence on statutory law. Sweden's civil law tradition, as in the rest of Europe, is founded upon Roman law as codified in the Corpus Juris Civilis, but as developed within German law, rather than upon the Napoleonic Code. But, over time Sweden along with the other Scandinavian countries have deviated significantly from their classical Roman and German models. Instead, the Scandinavian countries (Sweden, Norway, and Denmark) together with Finland, the Faroe Islands, Greenland, Åland (self-governing) and Iceland may be said to have a special "Nordic" version of jurisprudence that is neither a truly civil law system nor a part of the British-derived common law legal system.

Before reception of Roman-Germanic law, the Nordic countries had a deep common law tradition of their own, including juries (tolvmän, lit. 'twelve men') delivering verdicts with a jurist as a chairman, general deliberative assemblies (ting) under a lawspeaker (lagman), and rigidly fixed rules for the conditions of the kingship, which before 1544 was elected. Contemporary features deviating from general civil law systems include no codified constitution, no civil code, and significant dependence on case law; allotment under Swedish bankruptcy law, for instance, relies heavily on a precedent case from 1982, rather than statute. Contract law is also largely non-codified or non-binding, with significant leeway given to parties, except for conditions of consumer protection. Juries of a kind are still used in both civil and criminal cases – particularly in the district courts – although their appointment is nowadays a party political matter, with political judges (nämndemän) who are thus neither selected by lot, nor professional judges.

== Constitution ==
Sweden has a written constitution consisting of four fundamental laws. A distinction is made between fundamental laws and other laws; the difference being that any amendment of fundamental laws requires two identical decisions to be made by the Riksdag (Sweden's national legislature), separated by an election.

== Statutes ==
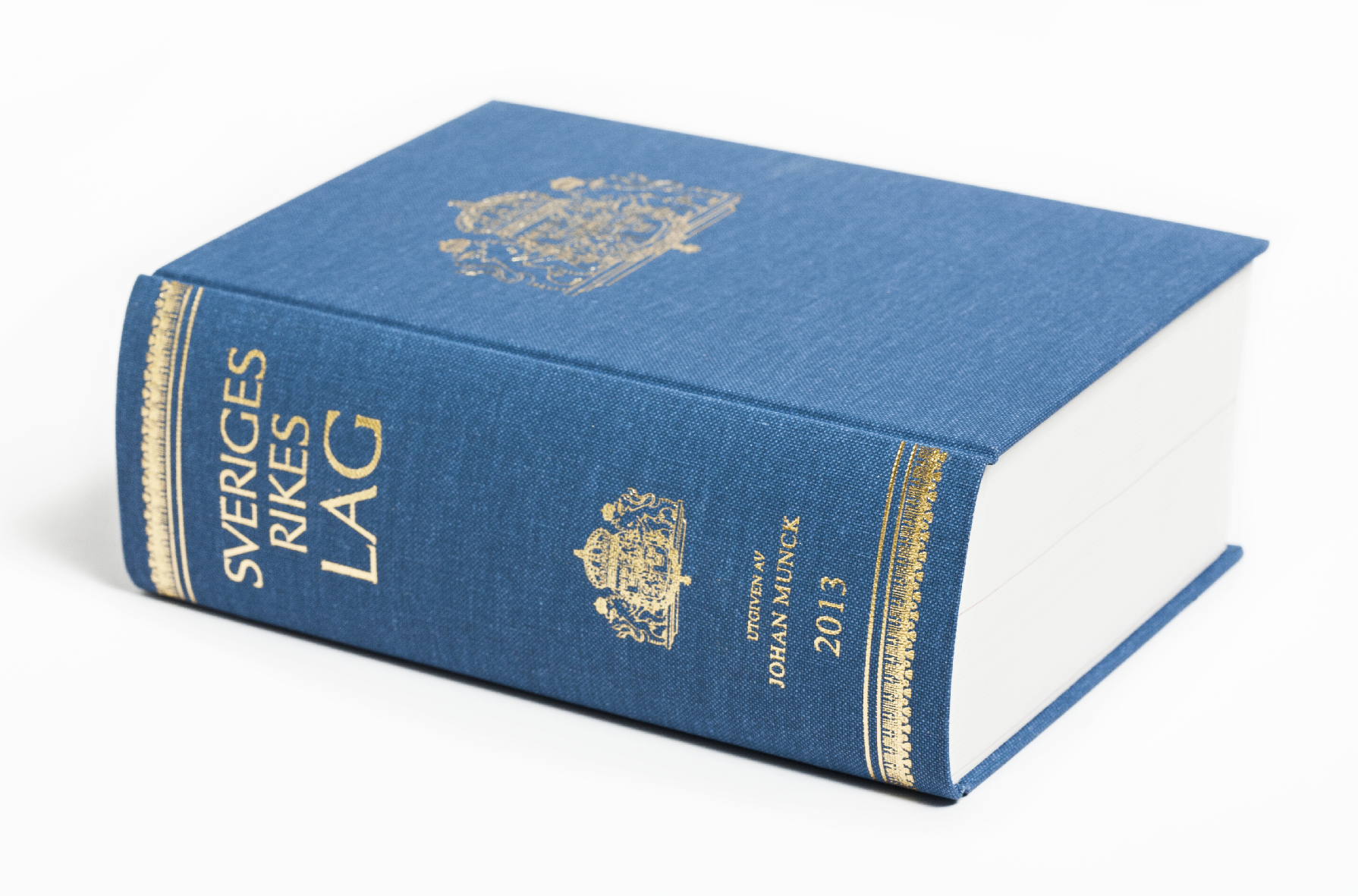
Sveriges rikes lag, the de facto statute book

The Swedish Code of Statutes (SFS) is the official chronological compilation of all new national laws enacted by the Riksdag and ordinances issued by the Government. Sveriges rikes lag is an annually privately-published Swedish law book, containing a selection of laws and other statutes in the SFS that are deemed to be of general interest.

The Swedish statutes includes the criminal law, criminal procedure, government regulations, legal information, civil law, agriculture, and many other major topic areas and subject matter that are important to the development and society of Sweden. The code is derived into positive law, with a mix of statutory law and civil law, and is amended from time to time. It also contains the Constitution of Sweden. Unlike most continental European countries, however, Sweden's codified statutes do not include a comprehensive Civil Code comparable to the German BGB or the French Civil Code and instead set forth statutory law in a piecemeal fashion. For example, rather than addressing the law of obligations in one major title of a comprehensive civil code, Sweden addresses the subset of the law of obligations pertaining to torts in an isolated statute passed piecemeal in 1972 that is not itself comprehensive or complete. Similarly, Sweden's contract act just addresses selected topics in contract law leaving the rest to case law, rather than comprehensively addressing all facets of contract law as a civil code on the subject would. In other words, Swedish statutes are more similar in character to statutes in the United States and other Commonwealth nations than to the comprehensive civil codes that predominate in continental European civil law systems and similar systems in Asia and Latin America based upon the continental European civil law systems.

Significant efforts have been made in the post-World War II era by Scandinavian Justice Ministers to harmonize the private law of the Nordic countries with each other.

== Case law ==
Unlike other Continental civil law systems, in which case law is generally not binding authority even if it can inform a judge's decision, and much like the common law legal systems of the British Commonwealth and former British dependencies (of which Sweden is not a part), Sweden relies upon authoritative judge made case law as an important supplement to its statutes.

== History ==
The law was unified by legislation of King Magnus Eriksson c. 1350 into two general codes. These were replaced by a single code, the Civil Code of 1734, which was promulgated in 1734. Only two of the nine codes that made up the Civil Code of 1734, however, are still in force. Parts of the Commercial Code and the Building Code are still in effect. Marriage is regulated in the Marriage Code of 1987; the Parental Code is from 1949; the Inheritance Code is from 1958; etc.

== See also ==
- Judiciary of Sweden
- Law enforcement in Sweden
