= Studentlitteratur =

Academic publishing company

Studentlitteratur is an academic publishing company based in Sweden and publishing mostly in Swedish. It is one of the largest producers of university text books and course books in Sweden.

The company was established in 1963 and is based in the university city of Lund.
