= Swedish National Courts Administration =

Swedish administrative authority

- Domstolsverket (DV)
- The coat of arms of the Swedish National Courts Administration

Agency overview
- Formed: 1975
- Headquarters: Jönköping
- Minister responsible: Gunnar Strömmer, (Ministry of Justice)
- Agency executive: Mikael Forsgren, (Director-General)
- Parent agency: Ministry of Justice
- Key documents: Regleringsbrev; Instruktion
- Website: domstol.se

The Swedish National Courts Administration (SNCA) (Swedish: Domstolsverket) is a Swedish administrative authority organized under the Ministry of Justice for administration of courts. It functions as a service organisation for the Swedish courts, including the general courts, the general administrative courts and a number of special courts.

The SNCA does not hold any powers over these courts. It acts purely as an umbrella organization to provide economy of scale for service, and is responsible for the overall coordination of the courts. It also deals with common issues in the Judiciary of Sweden; such as personnel development, education and information, the preparation of regulations, advice and instructions, and the dissemination of information to citizens. The agency also provide legal information on-line, via a Government website.

== History and organisation ==
The Swedish National Courts Administration was established in 1975 in Jönköping, and is headed by Director-General Mikael Forsgren. It is organized into eight departments: Finance Department, Human Resources Department, Development Department, IT Department, Security Department, Communications Department, Administrative Department and Legal Department plus an Internal Audit Office.

== See also ==
- Judiciary of Sweden
