= Government of Sweden =

Highest executive authority in Sweden

Government of the Kingdom of Sweden
- Central government
- Lesser coat of arms of Sweden

Overview
- Established: 1 January 1975
- State: Kingdom of Sweden
- Leader: Prime minister (Statsminister)
- Appointed by: Prime minister is elected by the Riksdag. Other ministers (statsråd) are appointed by the prime minister.
- Main organ: Cabinet
- Responsible to: Riksdag
- Headquarters: Rosenbad, Stockholm
- Website: www.government.se

The government of the Kingdom of Sweden (Swedish: Konungariket Sveriges regering) is the national cabinet of Sweden, and the country's executive authority.

The government consists of the prime minister and their cabinet ministers (Swedish: statsråd). The government is responsible for its actions to the Riksdag.

The prime minister is nominated by the Speaker of the Riksdag, and is elected and discharged by vote of the Riksdag. The cabinet ministers are appointed and dismissed at the discretion of the prime minister. Cabinet ministers who lose a vote of confidence in the Riksdag are discharged by the Speaker.

The short-form name regeringen ("the government") is used both in the Basic Laws of Sweden and in the vernacular, while the long-form is only used in international treaties.

== Organization ==
The government governs the country and is responsible for its actions to the Riksdag. The government consists of the prime minister and other cabinet ministers (Swedish: statsråd), and operates as a collegial body with collective responsibility.

=== The prime minister ===
The prime minister is nominated by the Speaker of the Riksdag, following formal consultations with representatives of the party groups of the Riksdag. Within four days, the Riksdag proceeds to a vote on the proposal. Unless more than half of the members of the Riksdag vote against the proposal, the nominee is approved and the Speaker proceeds to appoint their nominee as prime minister. Thus, the prime minister may be elected without a majority of the Riksdag voting for them.

The prime minister may appoint a designated deputy among their ministers, to deputise for them in case of absence. Failing to do so, or in the case of the deputy being unable to deputise at a given time, the prime minister's duties will be assumed by the minister currently in office that has served as minister for the longest period of time.

=== The cabinet ministers and heads of ministries ===
The prime minister appoints their cabinet ministers, organizes the Government Office into ministries (Swedish: departement), and appoints heads of ministries among their cabinet ministers.

Cabinet ministers are dismissed at the discretion of the prime minister or, by law, at the request of the minister themself. The Riksdag may vote to declare that a minister no longer enjoys the Riksdag's confidence. In such a case, the Speaker discharges said minister.

=== Role of the head of state ===
The constitutional head of state is the ruling Swedish monarch. Following the adoption of the 1974 Instrument of Government on 1 January 1975, the monarch is no longer vested with any executive powers at all with respect to the governance of the realm, be it nominal or formal powers. They continue to serve as a strictly ceremonial head of state.

The prime minister shall keep the head of state informed regarding the country's affairs.

The head of state chairs the Council of State, which meets at the convening of the government. The change of hands of government takes effect at such a Council of State.

== History ==
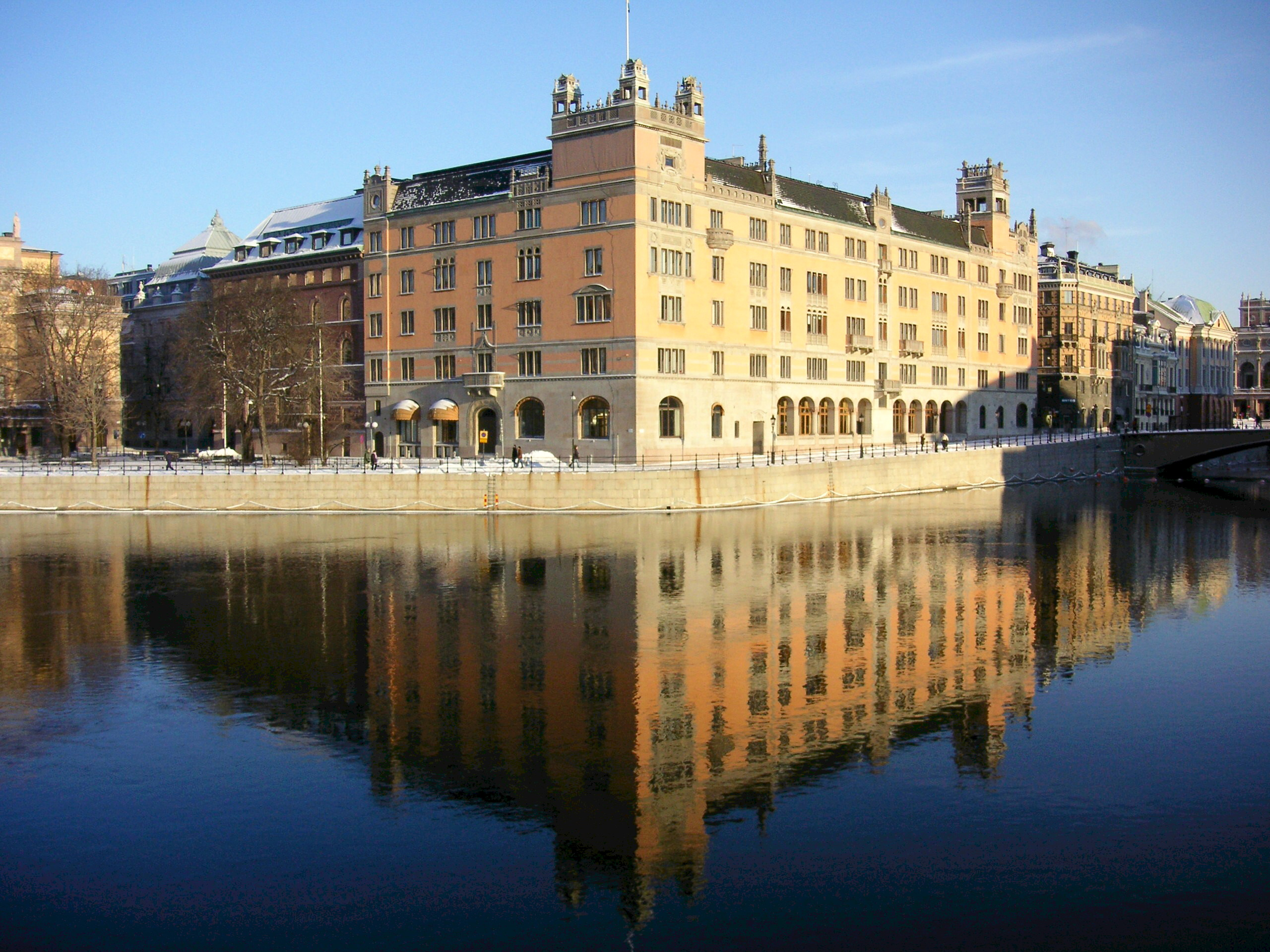
Rosenbad, in central Stockholm, has been the seat of the government since 1981

The present government is formed according to the laws set out in the 1974 Instrument of Government. But it traces its history back to the Middle Ages, when the Privy Council of Sweden was formed in the 12th century. It functioned in this capacity until 1789, when King Gustav III had it abolished as the Riksdag passed the Union and Security Act. The old privy council had only had members from the aristocracy. Gustav III instead instituted Rikets allmänna ärendens beredning. It functioned as government until 1809, when a new Instrument of Government was introduced, thus creating the present government's predecessor, the Council of State. It acted as the government of Sweden until 31 December 1974.

== Role and scope ==
The government has a stronger constitutional position than the cabinets in other Scandinavian monarchies. This is because under the Instrument of Government (Swedish: regeringsformen) — one of the fundamental laws of the realm — the government is both the de jure and de facto executive authority in Sweden. In Denmark and Norway, the monarch is at least the nominal chief executive, but is bound by convention to act on the advice of the cabinet. However, Chapter 1, Article 6 of the Instrument of Government explicitly states:

The government governs the realm. It is accountable to the Riksdag

The Instrument of Government sets out the main responsibilities and duties of the government (including the prime minister's and other cabinet ministers') and how it relates to other organs of the state.

The chancellor of justice and other state administrative authorities come under the government, unless they are authorities under the Riksdag according to the present Instrument of Government or by virtue of other law.

— Instrument of Government, Chapter 12, Article 1.

Most state administrative authorities (statliga förvaltningsmyndigheter), as opposed to local authorities (kommuner), sort under the government, including the Armed Forces, Coast Guard, Customs Service and the police.

While the judiciary technically sorts under the government in the fiscal sense, Chapter 11 of the Instrument of Government provides safeguards to ensure its independence.

In a unique feature of the Swedish constitutional system, individual cabinet ministers do not bear any individual ministerial responsibility for the performance of the agencies within their portfolio; as the directors-general and other heads of government agencies report directly to the government as a whole, the ministers also cannot intervene in matters that are to be handled by the specific government agencies, unless otherwise provided for in law; thus the origin of the pejorative, in Swedish political parlance, ministerstyre (English: "ministerial rule").

=== High Contracting Party ===
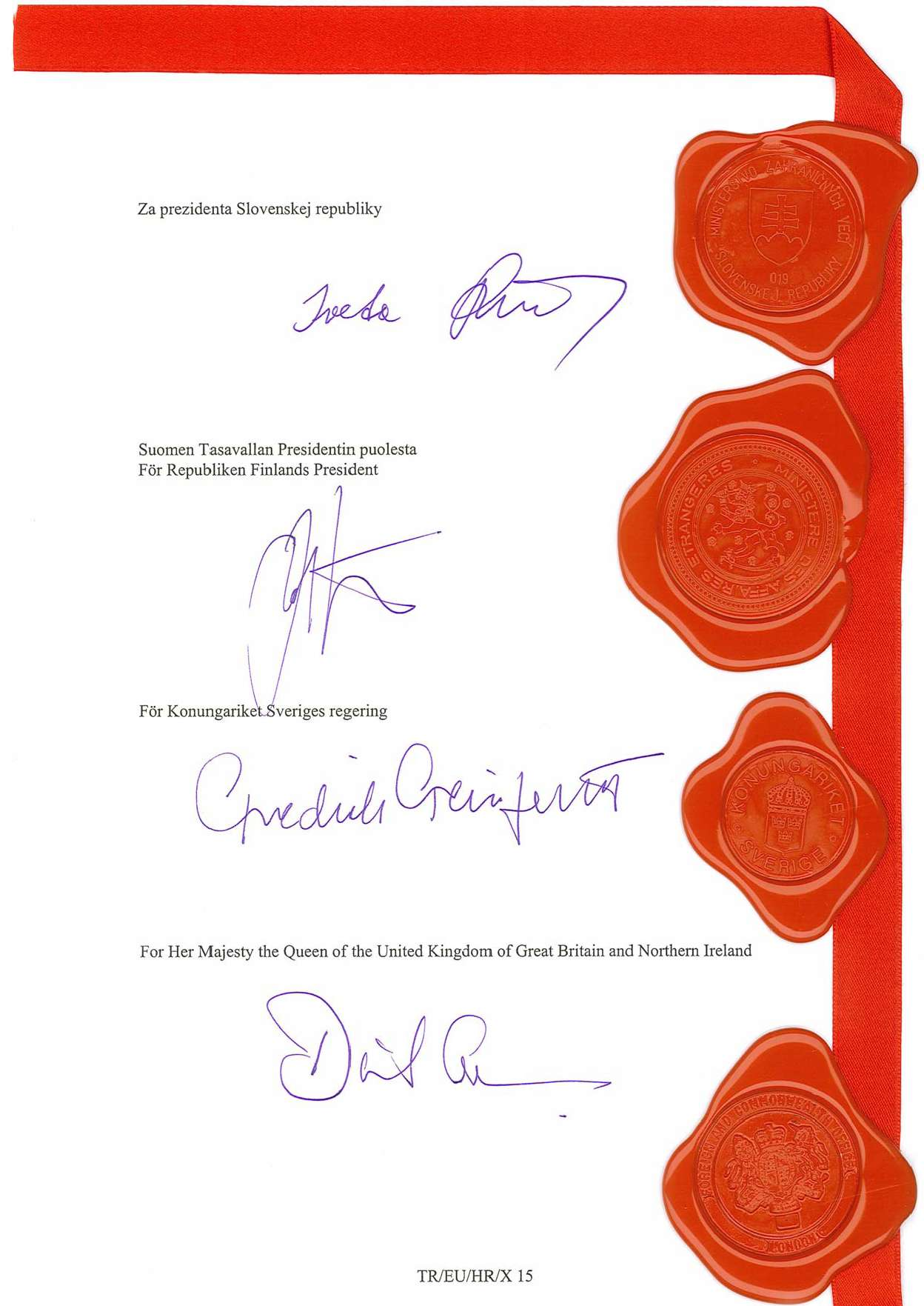
Image of the signature blocks with seals of the 2011 Croatia EU Accession Treaty for Slovakia, Finland, Sweden and the United Kingdom. Sweden is the only one of the four not with its head of state as high contracting party

The government of Sweden is the high contracting party when entering treaties with foreign sovereign states and international organisations (such as the European Union), as per 10:1 of the Instrument of Government. In most other parliamentary systems (monarchies and republics alike) this formal function is usually vested in the head of state but exercised by ministers in such name.

=== Promulgation ===
Chapter 7, Article 7 prescribes that laws and ordinances are promulgated by the government (by the prime minister or other cabinet minister), and are subsequently published in the Swedish Code of Statutes (Swedish: Svensk författningssamling).

== Formation and dismissal ==
Following a general election, the Speaker of the Riksdag begins to hold talks with the leaders of the parties with representation in the Riksdag, the Speaker then nominates a candidate for prime minister (statsminister). The nomination is then put to a vote in the chamber. Unless an absolute majority of the members (175 members) votes "no", the nomination is confirmed, otherwise it is rejected. The Speaker must then find a new nominee. This means the Riksdag can consent to a prime minister without casting any "yes" votes.

After being elected, the prime minister appoints the cabinet ministers and announces them to the Riksdag. Prospective ministers do not have to be sitting members of the Riksdag, but if a member of the Riksdag accepts a nomination, they would surrender their seat to a substitute member. The new government takes office at a special council held at the Royal Palace before the monarch, at which the Speaker of the Riksdag formally announces to the monarch that the Riksdag has elected a new prime minister and that the prime minister has chosen his cabinet ministers.

The Riksdag can cast a vote of no confidence against any single cabinet minister (Swedish: statsråd), thus forcing a resignation. To succeed, a vote of no confidence must be supported by an absolute majority (175 members).

If a vote of no confidence is cast against the prime minister, the entire government is rejected. A losing government has one week to call for a general election or else the procedure of nominating a new prime minister starts anew.

== Cabinets ==
Government of Sweden
- Sveriges regering
- Lesser coat of arms of Sweden
- Role: Executive cabinet
- Established: 1975
- Constitution instrument: Instrument of Government
- Predecessor entities: Privy Council (12th century—1789); Rikets allmänna ärendens beredning (1789–1809); Council of State (1809—1974)

Cabinet
- Members: Kristersson Cabinet
- Prime Minister: Ulf Kristersson
- Deputy to the Prime Minister: Ebba Busch
- Number of members: 24

Administration
- Working language: Swedish
- Staff organization: Government Offices (the ministries are organised as entities within it)
- Location: Stockholm, Stockholm County, Sweden
- Seat: Rosenbad (since 1981)

=== Present Cabinet ===
Portfolio	Minister	Took office	Left office	Party
Prime Minister's Office
Prime Minister	Ulf Kristersson	18 October 2022	Incumbent	Moderate
Deputy Prime Minister (Note: Not a separate minister post)	Ebba Busch	18 October 2022	Incumbent	Christian Democrats
Minister for EU Affairs; Minister for Nordic Cooperation	Jessika Roswall	18 October 2022	10 September 2024	Moderate
Minister for EU Affairs; Minister for Nordic Cooperation	Jessica Rosencrantz	10 September 2024	Incumbent	Moderate
Ministry of Justice
Minister for Justice	Gunnar Strömmer	18 October 2022	Incumbent	Moderate
Minister for Migration	Maria Malmer Stenergard	18 October 2022	10 September 2024	Moderate
Minister for Migration	Johan Forssell	10 September 2024	Incumbent	Moderate
Ministry of Foreign Affairs
Minister for Foreign Affairs	Tobias Billström	18 October 2022	10 September 2024	Moderate
Minister for Foreign Affairs	Maria Malmer Stenergard	10 September 2024	Incumbent	Moderate
Minister of Foreign Trade and International Development Cooperation	Johan Forssell	18 October 2022	10 September 2024	Moderate
Minister of Foreign Trade and International Development Cooperation	Benjamin Dousa	10 September 2024	Incumbent	Moderate
Ministry of Defence
Minister for Defence	Pål Jonson	18 October 2022	Incumbent	Moderate
Minister for Civil Defence	Carl-Oskar Bohlin	18 October 2022	Incumbent	Moderate
Ministry of Health and Social Affairs
Minister for Social Affairs	Jakob Forssmed	18 October 2022	Incumbent	Christian Democrats
Minister for Health	Acko Ankarberg Johansson	18 October 2022	Incumbent	Christian Democrats
Minister for Social Services	Camilla Waltersson Grönvall	18 October 2022	Incumbent	Moderate
Minister for Social Security and Pensions	Anna Tenje	18 October 2022	Incumbent	Moderate
Ministry of Finance
Minister for Finance	Elisabeth Svantesson	18 October 2022	Incumbent	Moderate
Minister for Financial Markets	Niklas Wykman	18 October 2022	Incumbent	Moderate
Minister for Public Administration	Erik Slottner	18 October 2022	Incumbent	Christian Democrats
Ministry of Education and Research
Minister for Education	Mats Persson	18 October 2022	10 September 2024	Liberals
Minister for Education	Johan Pehrson	10 September 2024	28 June 2025	Liberals
Minister for Education and Integration	Simona Mohamsson	28 June 2025	Incumbent	Liberals
Minister for Schools	Lotta Edholm	18 October 2022	25 June 2025	Liberals
Minister for Upper Secondary School, Higher Education and Research	Lotta Edholm	25 June 2025	Incumbent	Liberals
Ministry of the Environment, Enterprise and Innovation
Minister for Energy and Enterprise	Ebba Busch	18 October 2022	Incumbent	Christian Democrats
Minister for the Environment	Romina Pourmokhtari	18 October 2022	Incumbent	Liberals
Ministry of Culture
Minister for Culture	Parisa Liljestrand	18 October 2022	Incumbent	Moderate
Ministry of Employment
Minister for Employment and for Integration	Johan Pehrson	18 October 2022	10 September 2024	Liberals
Minister for Employment and for Integration	Mats Persson	10 September 2024	28 June 2025	Liberals
Minister for Employment	Johan Britz	28 June 2025	Incumbent	Liberals
Minister for Gender Equality	Paulina Brandberg	18 October 2022	1 April 2025	Liberals
Minister for Gender Equality	Nina Larsson	1 April 2025	Incumbent	Liberals
Ministry of Rural Affairs and Infrastructure
Minister for Rural Affairs	Peter Kullgren	18 October 2022	Incumbent	Christian Democrats
Minister for Infrastructure and for Housing	Andreas Carlson	18 October 2022	Incumbent	Christian Democrats

=== Former cabinets ===
Each appointment of a new prime minister is considered to result in a new cabinet, irrespective if the prime minister is reappointed or not. However, there is no automatic resignation following a defeat in a general election, so an election does not always result in a new cabinet.

== Government Offices ==
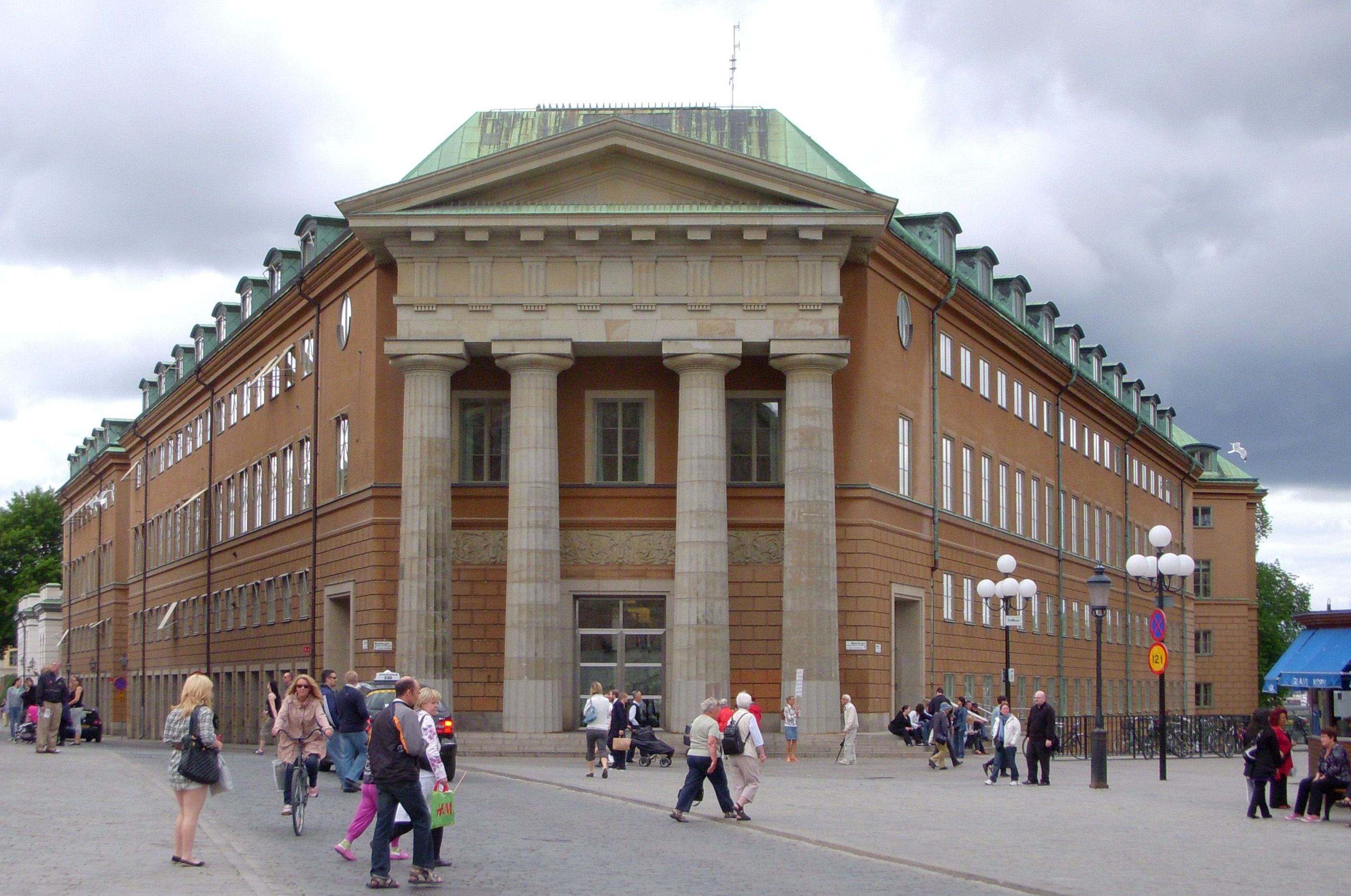
Chancellery House (Swedish: Kanslihuset) was the seat of the Government Offices until 1981, and the housed its predecessor, the Royal Chancery, dating back to the days of the Royal Palace fire in 1697

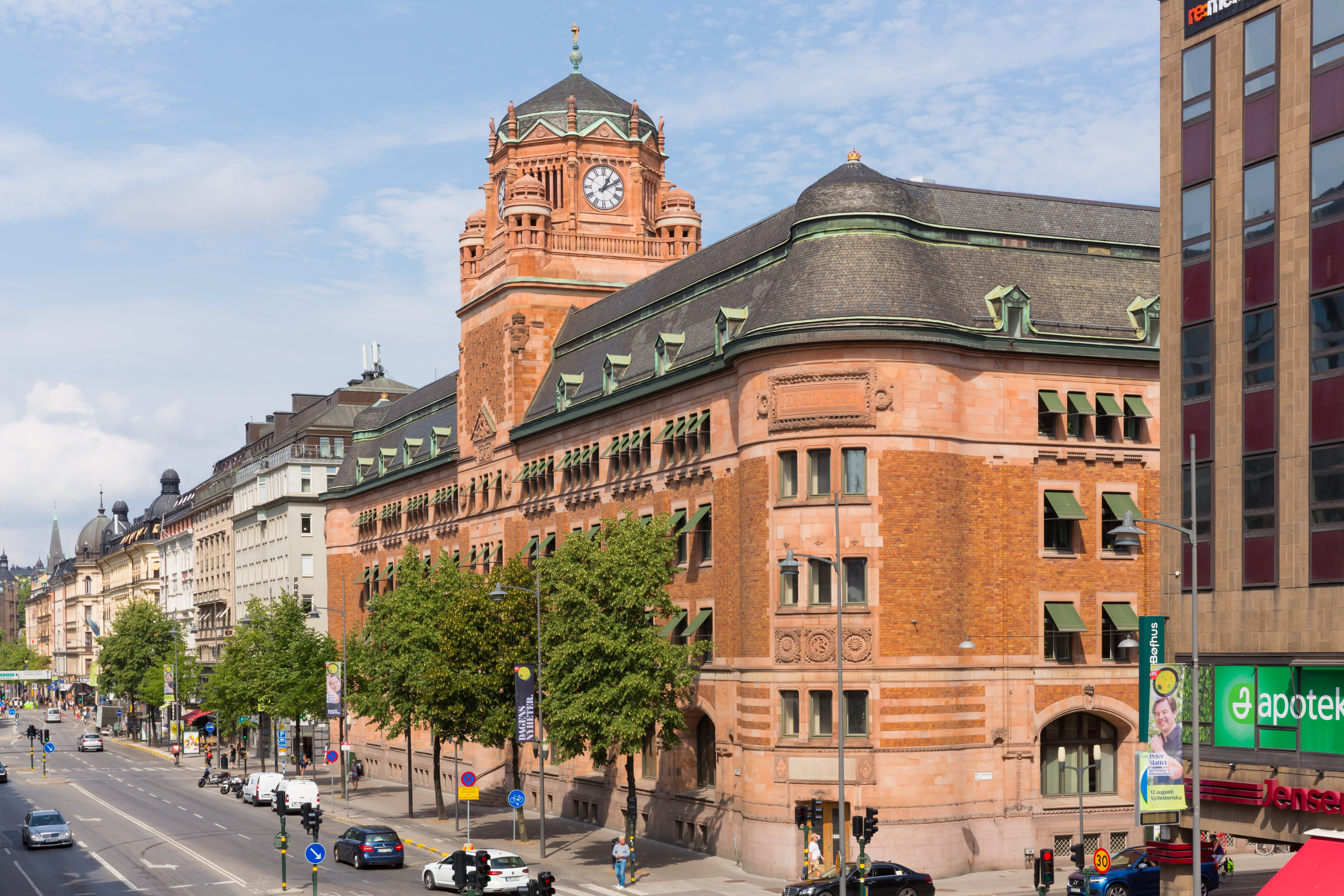
The Central Post Office Building, houses the Ministry of Climate and Enterprise.

Previously known as the Royal Chancery (Swedish: Kunglig Majestäts kansli), the name was changed to the Government Offices (Swedish: Regeringskansliet) on 1 January 1975 with the current Instrument of Government entering into effect.

The Instrument of Government briefly mentions in Chapter 7, Article 1 that there is a staff organization supporting the government, known as the Government Offices. The present organizational charter for the Government Offices is found in the ordinance named Förordning (1996:1515) med instruktion för Regeringskansliet. Since the issuance of that ordinance in 1996, all the ministries are entities within the Government Offices (headed by the prime minister), rather than as separate organisations, even though they operate as such. Below follows a short summary of the current structure.

== See also ==
- County administrative boards of Sweden
- Economy of Sweden
- Elections in Sweden
- Government agencies in Sweden
- History of Sweden
- List of prime ministers of Sweden
- List of government ministries of Sweden
- Municipalities of Sweden
- Politics of Sweden
- Principle of Public Access
- Referendums in Sweden
- Royal Court of Sweden
- State secretary (Sweden)
- List of government enterprises of Sweden
- Statens offentliga utredningar
- Swedish Code of Statutes
- Travaux préparatoires

== Notes ==
Bibliography

- Larsson, Torbjörn; Bäck, Henry (2008). Governing and Governance in Sweden. Lund: Studentlitteratur AB. ISBN 978-91-44-03682-3.
- Petersson, Olof (2010). Den offentliga makten (in Swedish). Stockholm: SNS Förlag. ISBN 978-91-86203-66-5.
