= Courtyard Speech =

1914 speech given by King Gustaf V of Sweden

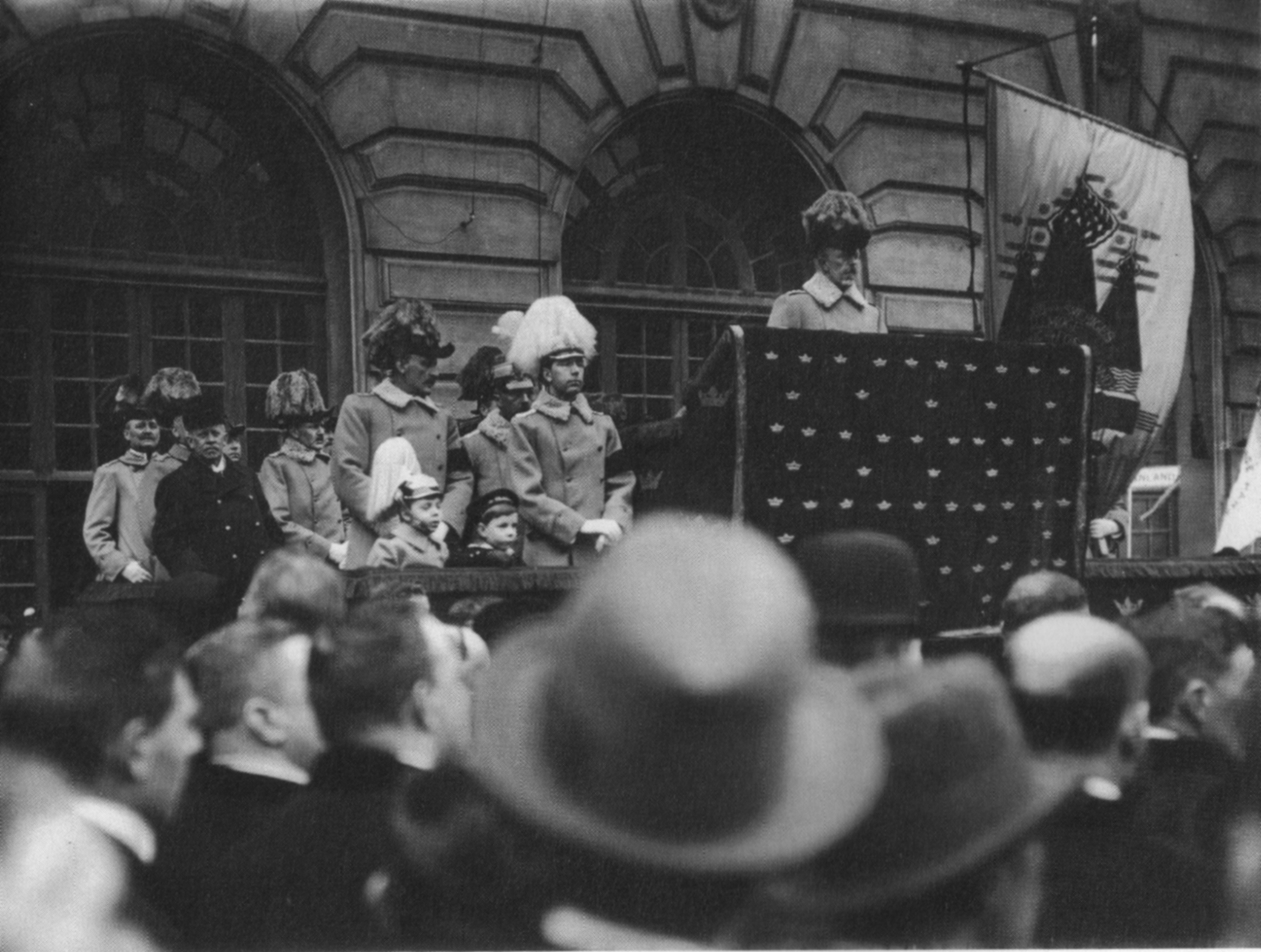
King Gustaf V during the speech

The Courtyard Speech (Swedish: Borggårdstalet) was a speech written by conservative explorer Sven Hedin and Swedish Army lieutenant Carl Bennedich, delivered by King Gustaf V of Sweden to the participants of the Peasant armament support march (Swedish: Bondetåget) at the courtyard of the Royal Palace in Stockholm.

The speech sparked the Courtyard Crisis in Swedish government in February 1914.

== Context ==
The speech was a part in the organized expressions of Swedish conservatives who criticized the liberal Prime Minister Karl Staaff's decision to lower military spending, particularly the decision not to proceed with the construction of a coastal battleship for the Swedish Navy (then known as the "F-ship", which later became the Sverige-class coastal defence ship), which had been decided upon by the previous right wing government headed by Arvid Lindman. Before World War I, modernisation of navies and introduction of Dreadnought-style heavy warships stood at the forefront of naval technology at the time, and the issue generally received a lot of public attention.

== Speech ==
The speech was written by Sven Hedin and Lieutenant Carl Bennedich, well before the date of the planned peasant armament support march. The speech was reviewed by several members of the political elite before it was delivered. Hedin showed the speech to the leader of the conservatives in the first chamber, who later became Conservative Prime Minister Ernst Trygger; he considered the speech to be brilliant even though he was not sure what the political consequences would be if the speech was delivered by the King. The Conservative politician and previous Prime Minister Arvid Lindman and the future Independent Liberal Prime Minister Gerhard Louis De Geer thought that the speech could lead to a constitutional crisis between the King and the members of the Council of State. Prime Minister Karl Staaff was not allowed to see the speech on before it was delivered by the King.

The speech was read by Gustav V on the inner courtyard of the Royal Palace as the protestors of the support march had reached the palace. For those of the 30,000 march participants who could not fit the inner courtyard, the speech was immediately read again by Crown Prince Gustaf Adolf and Prince Carl.

The initial line of the speech, I redlige män af Sveriges bondestam!, "Ye honest men of Sweden's yeomanry tribe" remains, because of its archaic grammar and choice of words and because of the political implications and importance of the speech, a famous quote in Swedish politics.

Parts of the speech
Paragraph	Original Swedish	English Translation
1st	I redlige män af Sveriges bondestam!	Ye honest men of Sweden's yeomanry tribe!
3rd paragraph	I hafven kommit för att säga Eder mening angående rikets vidmakthållande och vården om dess höghet. I ären här för att med Mig göra allom veterligt, att intet kraf är för högt och ingen börda för tung, då det gäller bevarandet af vår urgamla frihet och tryggandet af vår framtida utveckling.	Ye have come to speak Your opinion regarding the maintenance of the realm and the care for its highness. Ye are here with me to make known to all, that no demand is too high and no burden too heavy, when it comes to the preservation of our ancient freedom and the safeguarding of our future development.
4th paragraph	Från tider så fjerran, att de höljas i sagans dunkel, har detta rikes byggnad hvilat på grundvalen af det fast och orubbligt sammangjutna förtroendet mellan konung och folk. [...]	From times so distant, held hidden in times immemorial, the foundation of this realm has rested on the firm and unshakably welded trust between king and people. [...]
8th paragraph	[...] Jag skall, Min plikt som Eder konung likmätigt, söka visa Eder vägen för att nå vårt gemensamma mål. Följen och stödjen Mig derföre allt framgent!	[...] I shall, in accordance with My duty as Your king, seek to show You the way to reach our goal in common. Follow and support Me henceforth!
