= Signe Linderoth-Andersson =

Swedish politician

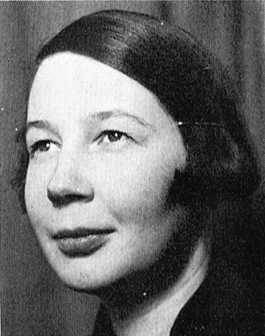
Signe Linderoth 1909 SPA (cropped)

Signe Linderoth-Andersson (1909-2000) was a Swedish politician (Swedish Social Democratic Party).

She was an MP of the Second Chamber of the Parliament of Sweden in 1941–1944.

She expressed criticism toward the policy of transit of German troops through Finland and Sweden during the second world war.

She worked as a pharmacist assistant in her father's pharmacy in Hjo, and married the carpenter Åke Andersson. She had small children during her tenure as MP, and brought her children to the parliament when on occasions no one else were available to take care of them when she worked.
