= Attentatet i Pålsjö skog =

1996 novel by Hans Alfredson

- Book cover
- Author: Hans Alfredson
- Language: Swedish
- Genre: Alternate history
- Publisher: Gerdins (hardcover); Wahlström & Widstrand (pocket)
- Publication date: 1996
- Publication place: Sweden
- ISBN: 978-91-46-17518-6
- OCLC: 185740071

Attentatet i Pålsjö skog (Attack in Pålsjö Forest in English) is a 1996 Swedish alternate history novel by Hans Alfredson. In the book a group of Swedish Communists blow up a German train passing through Sweden, killing several hundred German soldiers and Eva Braun who was on board. Adolf Hitler is infuriated and invades Sweden, which surrenders on 12 May 1941.

The novel uses many real-life characters. Prime Minister Per Albin Hansson is captured by the Germans, but others manage to escape and form an exile government in London. King Gustav V is also captured but abdicates, making prince Gustaf VI Adolf, who was already safely in London, the new king. Raoul Wallenberg smuggles Jews out of Sweden. More controversially, the book also mentions those who collaborate with the Germans. Author Per Olof Sundman and IKEA founder Ingvar Kamprad lead local SS groups. Fredrik Böök, Sven Hedin, Åke Ohlmarks and many others support the new rulers. Sven Olov Lindholm becomes a Quisling-like leader of occupied Sweden.

Due to the invasion of Sweden, Operation Barbarossa gets delayed by three weeks, giving Stalin time to organize a better defense, bringing the German downfall sooner. The Allied invasion of Normandy occurs in the spring of 1944 rather than in June. Hitler commits suicide in December 1944, and World War II ends in Europe on 28 December. By then, Sweden has been liberated from the north down as far as Östersund by the British, the Soviets and a British-trained Swedish exile army.

In the epilogue, it is said, that "more than four million Jews were killed". After the war, history returns largely to normal.

== See also ==
- Axis victory in World War II

The above page includes an extensive list of other Wikipedia articles regarding works of Nazi Germany/Axis/World War II alternate history.
