= Gustaf V =

King of Sweden from 1907 to 1950

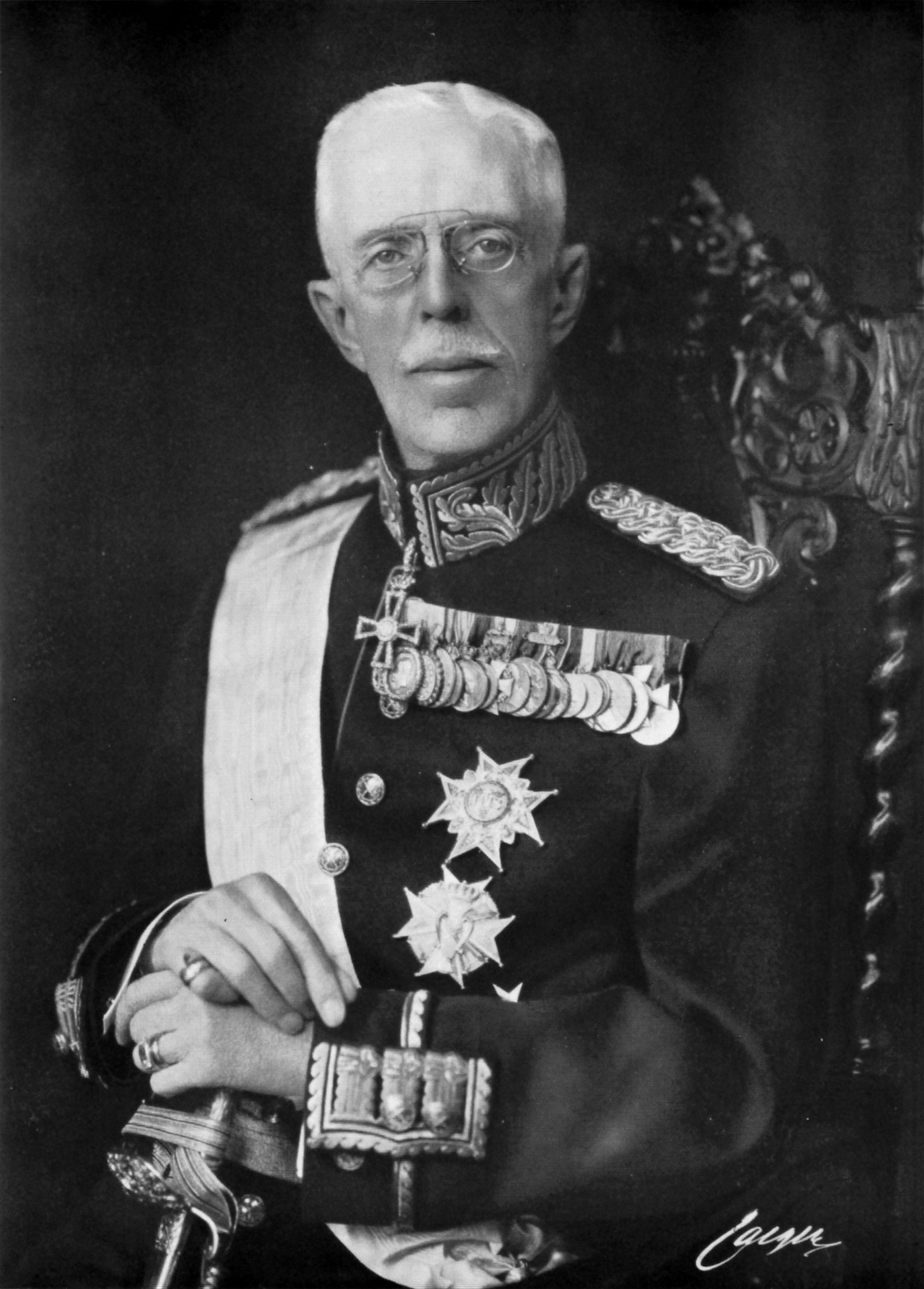
- Formal portrait, 1938

King of Sweden
- Reign: 8 December 1907 – 29 October 1950
- Predecessor: Oscar II
- Successor: Gustaf VI Adolf
- Born: 16 June 1858; Drottningholm Palace, Stockholm, Sweden
- Died: 29 October 1950 (aged 92); Drottningholm Palace, Stockholm, Sweden
- Burial: 9 November 1950; Riddarholmen Church
- Spouse: Victoria of Baden (m. 1881; died 1930)
- Issue: Gustaf VI Adolf; Prince Wilhelm, Duke of Södermanland; Prince Erik, Duke of Västmanland
Names
- Oscar Gustaf Adolf
- House: Bernadotte
- Father: Oscar II
- Mother: Sophia of Nassau
- Religion: Church of Sweden

Gustaf V (Oscar Gustaf Adolf; 16 June 1858 – 29 October 1950) was King of Sweden from 8 December 1907 until his death in 1950. He was the eldest son of King Oscar II and Sophia of Nassau, a half-sister of Adolphe, Grand Duke of Luxembourg. Reigning from the death of his father Oscar II in 1907 to his own death nearly 43 years later, he holds the record of being the oldest monarch of Sweden, dying at the age of 92. Gustaf also had the third-longest reign of a Swedish monarch after Magnus IV (1319–1364) and his own great-grandson, Carl XVI Gustaf (1973–present). He was also the last Swedish monarch to exercise his royal prerogatives, which largely died with him, although abolished only with the remaking of the Swedish constitution in 1974. He was the first Swedish king since the High Middle Ages not to have a coronation and so never wore the king's crown, a practice that has continued since.

Gustaf's early reign saw the rise of parliamentary rule in Sweden, although the leadup to World War I induced his dismissal of Liberal Prime Minister Karl Staaff in 1914, replacing him with his own figurehead, Hjalmar Hammarskjöld, the father of Dag Hammarskjöld, for most of the war. However, after the Liberals and Social Democrats secured a parliamentary majority under Staaff's successor, Nils Edén, he allowed Edén to form a new government which de facto stripped the monarchy of virtually all powers and enacted universal and equal suffrage, including for women, by 1919. Bowing to the principles of parliamentary democracy, he remained a popular figurehead for the remaining 31 years of his rule, although not completely without influence. Gustaf V had pro-German and anti-Communist stances which were outwardly expressed during World War I and the Russian Civil War. During World War II, he allegedly urged Per Albin Hansson's coalition government to accept requests from Nazi Germany for logistics support, arguing that refusing might provoke an invasion, an intervention which remains controversial. While sympathetic to military action against the Soviet Union, he personally pressured Miklos Horthy to halt deportations of Jews in the summer of 1944 and aided Raoul Wallenberg's efforts.

An avid hunter and sportsman, Gustaf presided over the 1912 Olympic Games and chaired the Swedish Association of Sports from 1897 to 1907. Most notably, he represented Sweden (under the alias of Mr G.) as a competitive tennis player, keeping up competitive tennis until his eighties, when his eyesight deteriorated rapidly. He was succeeded by his son, Gustaf VI Adolf.

== Early life ==
=== First years ===
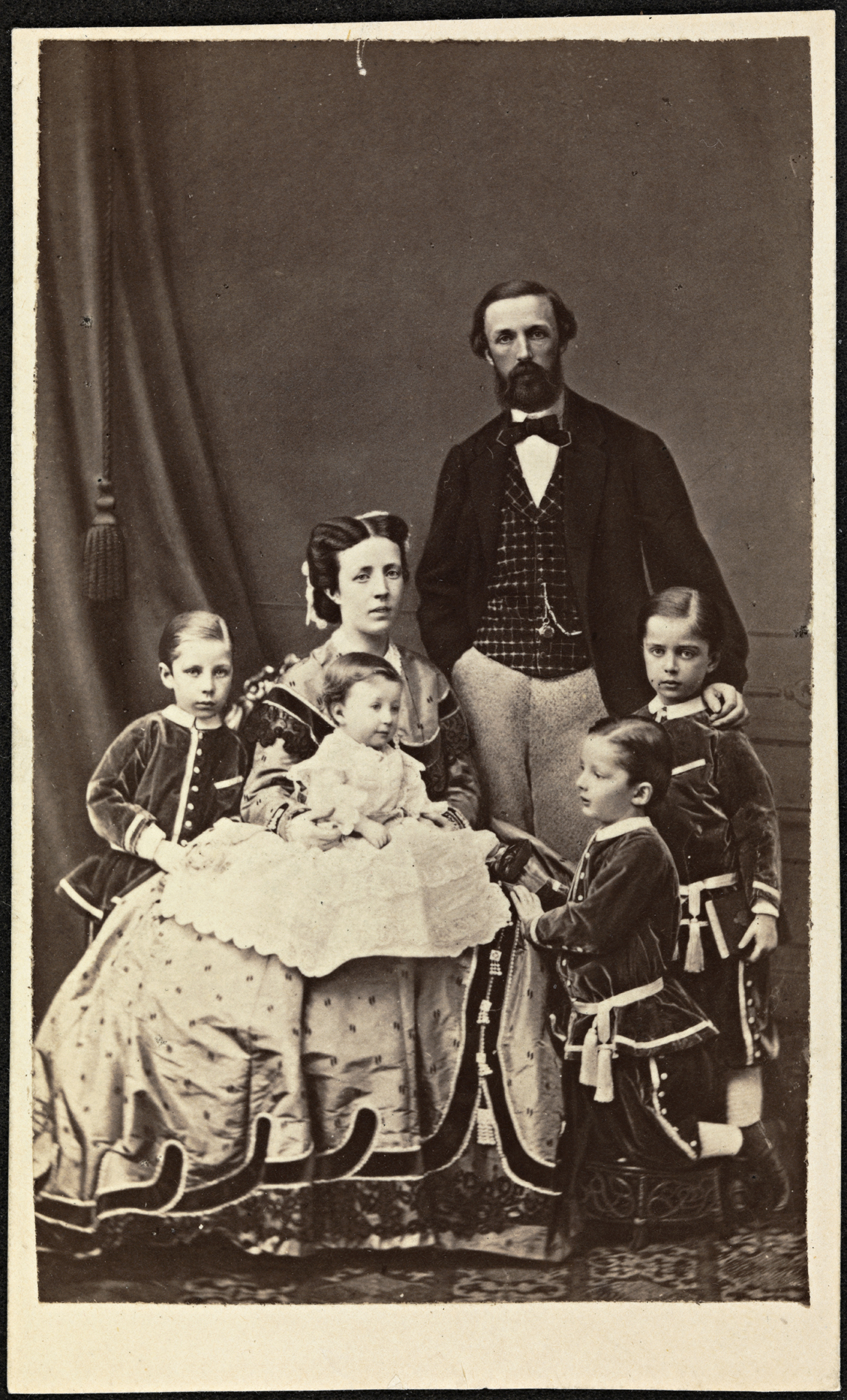
Prince Gustaf (far left) with his parents and brothers in 1865.

Gustaf V was born on 16 June 1858 in Drottningholm Palace in Ekerö, Stockholm County, the son of Prince Oscar, Duke of Östergötland and Princess Sofia of Nassau. His father was a younger son of the reigning king, Oscar I, and as the king's eldest son, Crown Prince Charles had no surviving sons, it could be expected that the new-born prince would one day inherit the Swedish throne. At birth he was created Duke of Värmland, and on 12 July he was baptised Oscar Gustaf Adolf at the Royal Chapel of the Stockholm Palace by the Archbishop of Uppsala, Henrik Reuterdahl.

The following year, his brother Prince Oscar was born, followed by Prince Carl in 1861, and Prince Eugen in 1865. The family lived in the Arvfurstens palats (Palace of the Hereditary Prince), an 18th-century palace located at Gustav Adolfs torg in central Stockholm, and the summers were spent at Sofiero Castle near Helsingborg in Scania, which the father acquired in 1864. During his early years, the prince was considered to have a weak body constitution, and as a consequence he was treated with electrotherapy on 10 May 1871.

The three eldest princes began their schooling at the newly founded Beskowska School in Östermalm in Stockholm in October 1869. Among the prince's classmates at the school was Hjalmar Branting, who went on to become leader of the Swedish Social Democratic Party and three times Prime Minister of Sweden.

=== Crown Prince ===
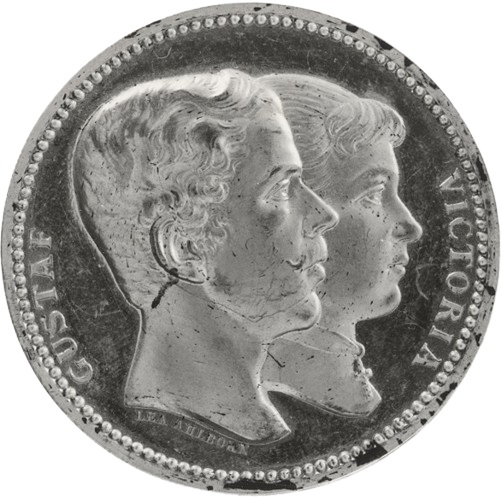
Wedding medal for Gustaf and Victoria in 1881

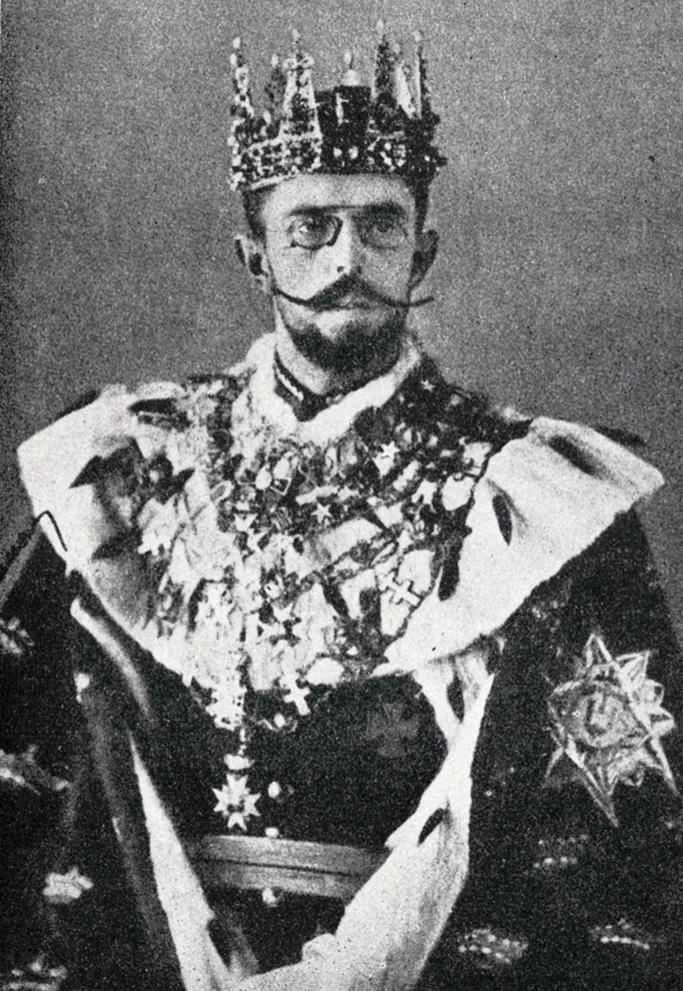
Crown Prince Gustaf wears the Coronet of the Heir Apparent in 1893

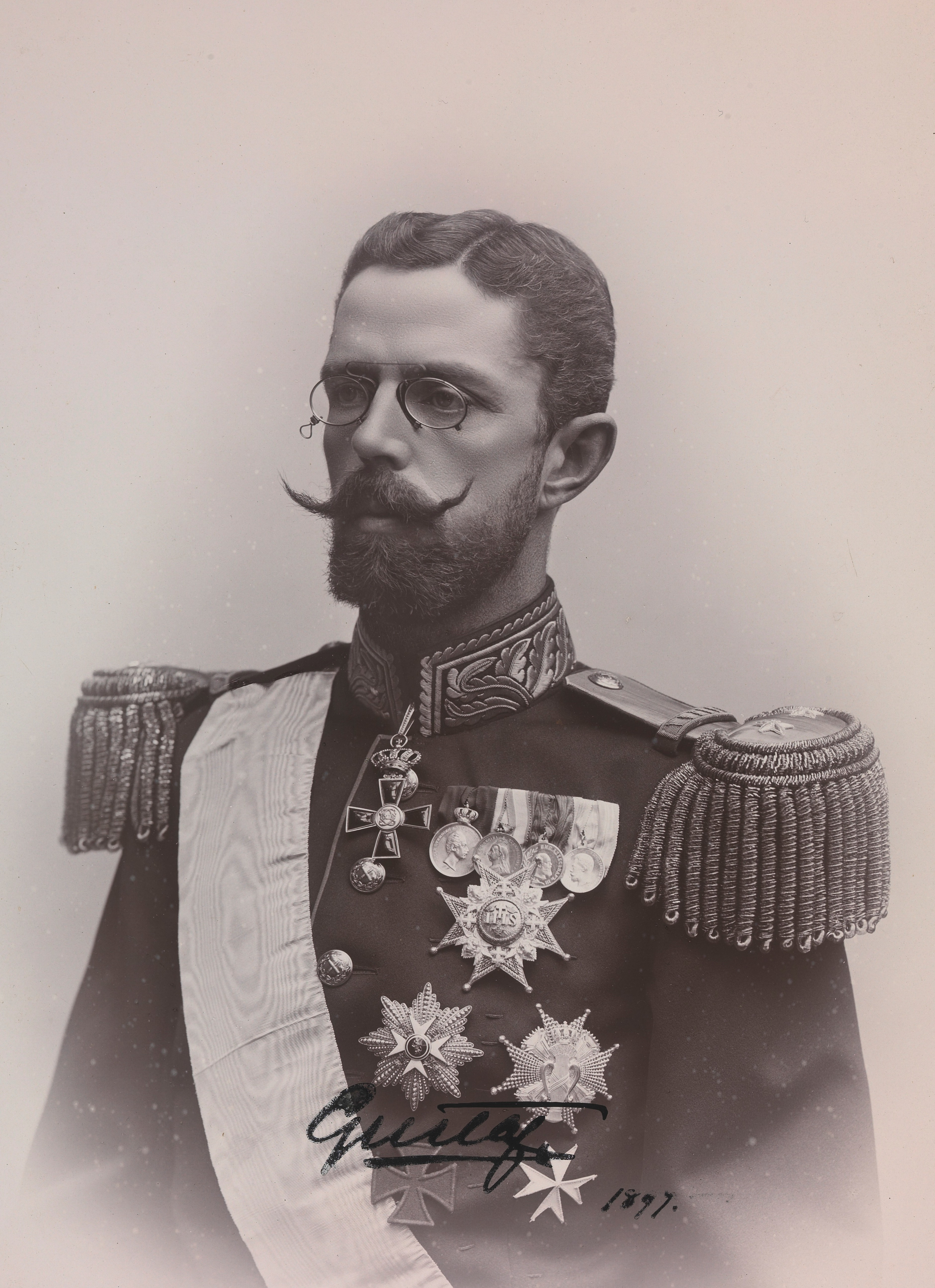
Photograph of Crown Prince Gustaf, c. 1897

On 18 September 1872 his uncle King Charles XV died, and Gustaf's father ascended the throne as King Oscar II. Upon his father's accession to the throne, Gustaf became crown prince of both Sweden and Norway at the age of 14. The new king and queen and their children now moved into the large Stockholm Palace, and the crown prince's schooling at the Beskowska School was interrupted, as he was now to receive his education as heir to the throne at the palace.

On 20 September 1881 in Karlsruhe, Germany, he married Princess Victoria of Baden, the only daughter of Frederick I, Grand Duke of Baden and Princess Louise of Prussia.

On 8 December 1907 King Oscar II died and the 49-year-old Gustaf succeeded his father as King of Sweden as the fifth monarch from the House of Bernadotte.

== Public life ==
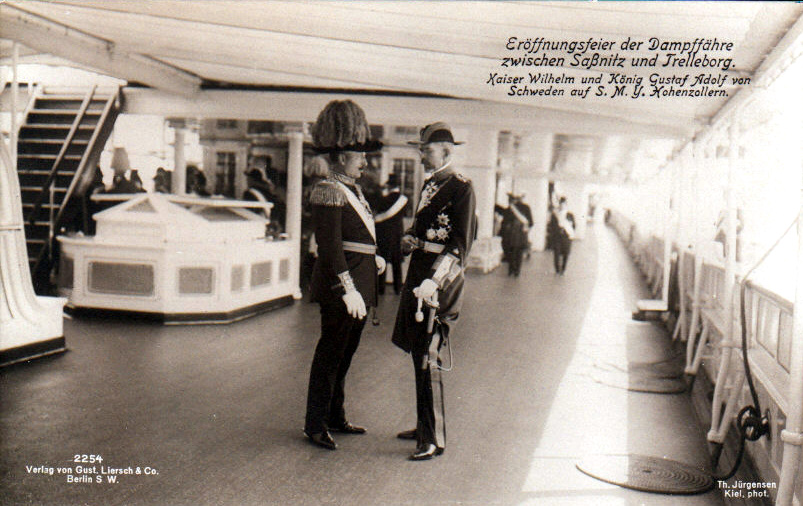
Wilhelm II and Gustaf V during the opening of the ferry between Sassnitz and Trelleborg, c. 1900

When he ascended the throne, Gustaf V was, at least on paper, a near-autocrat. The 1809 Instrument of Government made the King both head of state and head of government, and ministers were solely responsible to him. However, his father had been forced to accept a government chosen by the majority in Parliament in 1905. Since then, prime ministers had been de facto required to have the confidence of the Riksdag to stay in office.

Early in his reign, in 1910, Gustaf V refused to grant clemency to the convicted murderer Johan Alfred Ander, who thus became the last person to be executed in Sweden.

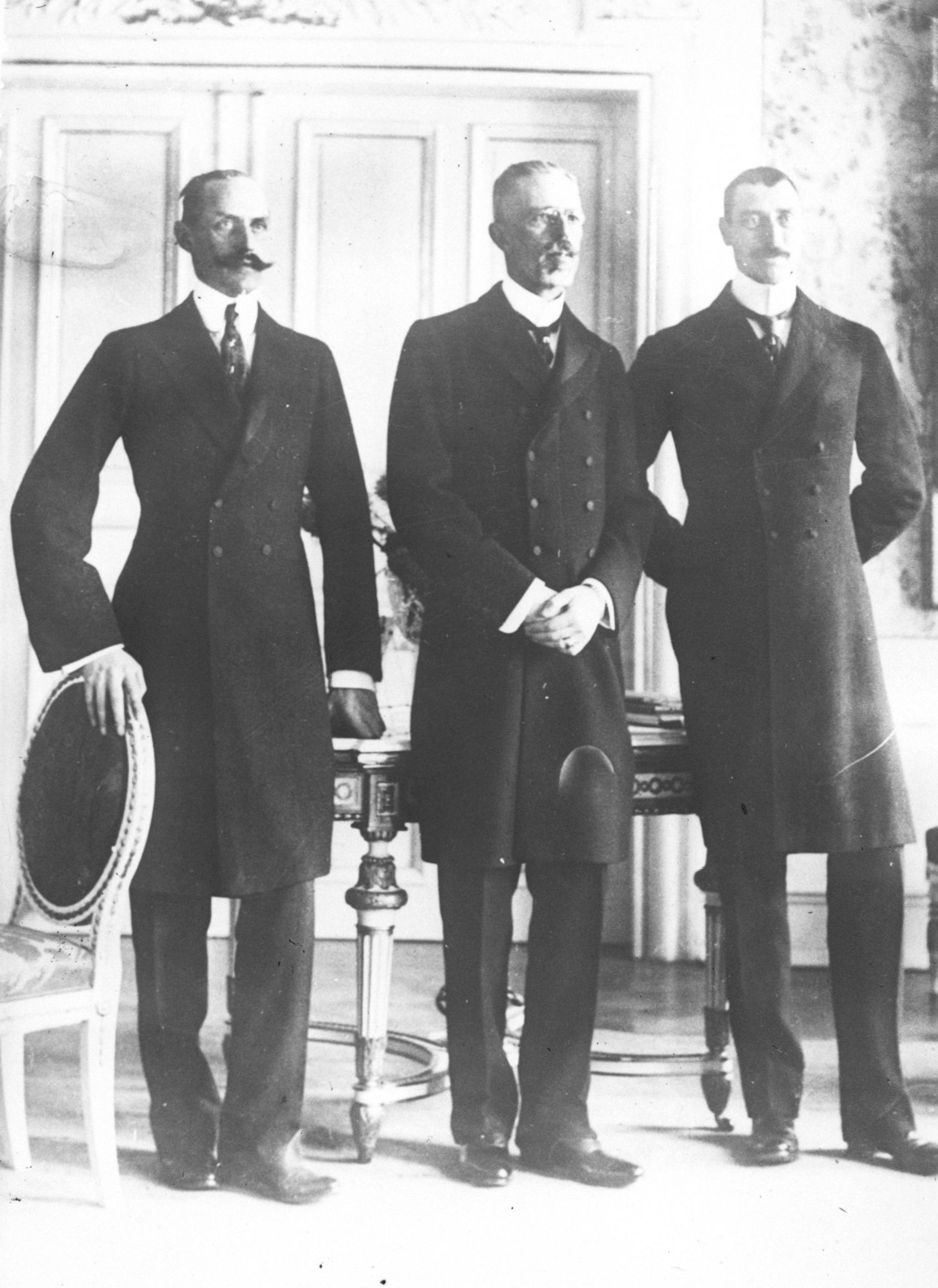
Meeting of the three kings in Malmö, 18 December 1914: Haakon VII of Norway, Gustaf V, and Christian X of Denmark

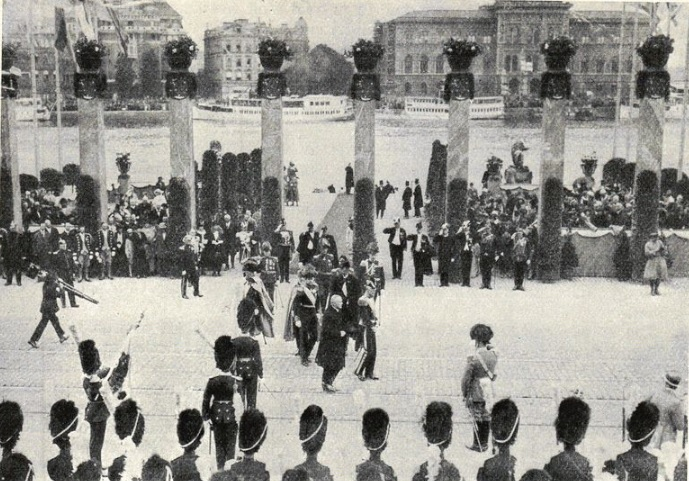
Gustaf V and visiting L. K. Relander, the 2nd President of the Republic of Finland, pass an honour guard in 1925 in Stockholm

At first Gustaf V seemed to be willing to accept parliamentary rule. After the Liberals won a massive landslide victory in 1911, Gustaf appointed Liberal leader Karl Staaff as Prime Minister. However, during the run-up to World War I, the elites objected to Staaff's defence policy. In February 1914, a large crowd of farmers gathered at the royal palace and demanded that the country's defences be strengthened. In his reply, the so-called Courtyard Speech—which was actually written by explorer Sven Hedin, an ardent conservative—Gustaf promised to strengthen the country's defences. Staaff was outraged, telling the King that parliamentary rule called for the Crown to stay out of partisan politics. He was also angered that he had not been consulted in advance of the speech. However, Gustaf retorted that he still had the right to "communicate freely with the Swedish people". The Staaff government resigned in protest, and Gustaf appointed a government of civil servants headed by Hjalmar Hammarskjöld (father of future UN Secretary-General Dag Hammarskjöld) in its place. The 1917 elections showed a heavy gain for the Liberals and Social Democrats, who between them held a decisive majority. Despite this, Gustaf initially tried to appoint a Conservative government headed by Johan Widén. However, Widén was unable to attract enough support for a coalition. It was now apparent that Gustaf could no longer appoint a government entirely of his own choosing, nor could he keep a government in office against the will of Parliament. With no choice but to appoint a Liberal as prime minister, he appointed a Liberal-Social Democratic coalition government headed by Staaff's successor as Liberal leader, Nils Edén. The Edén government promptly arrogated most of the king's political powers to itself and enacted numerous reforms, most notably the institution of complete (male and female) universal suffrage in 1918–1919. While Gustaf still formally appointed the ministers, they now had to have the confidence of Parliament. He was now also bound to act on the ministers' advice. Although the provision in the Instrument of Government stating that "the King alone shall govern the realm" remained unchanged, the king was now bound by convention to exercise his powers through the ministers. Thus, for all intents and purposes, the ministers did the actual governing. While ministers were already legally responsible to the Riksdag under the Instrument of Government, it was now understood that they were politically responsible to the Riksdag as well. Gustaf accepted his reduced role, and reigned for the rest of his life as a model limited constitutional monarch. Parliamentarianism had become a de facto reality in Sweden, even if it would not be formalised until 1974, when a new Instrument of Government stripped the monarchy of even nominal political power. Gustaf V was considered to have German sympathies during World War I. His political stance during the war was highly influenced by his wife, who felt a strong connection to her German homeland. On 18 December 1914, he sponsored a meeting in Malmö with the other two kings of Scandinavia to demonstrate unity. Another of Gustaf V's objectives was to dispel suspicions that he wanted to bring Sweden into the war on Germany's side.

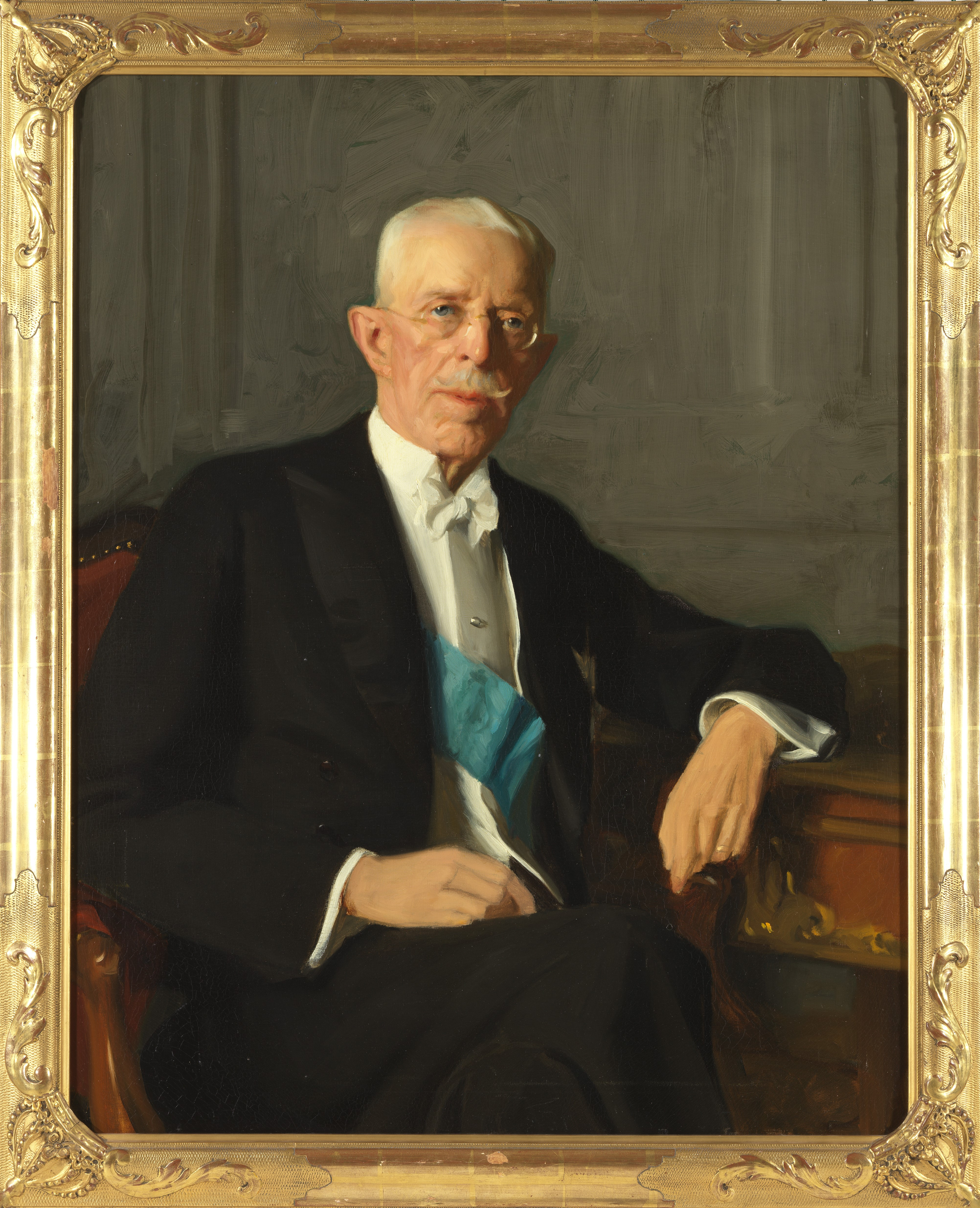
Portrait of Gustaf V by Bernhard Österman, 1937/38

Although effectively stripped of political power, Gustaf was not completely without influence. In 1938, for instance, he personally summoned the German ambassador to Sweden and told him that if Hitler attacked Czechoslovakia over its refusal to give up the Sudetenland, it would trigger a world war that Germany would almost certainly lose. Additionally, his long reign gave him great moral authority as a symbol of the nation's unity.

== Nazi connections ==
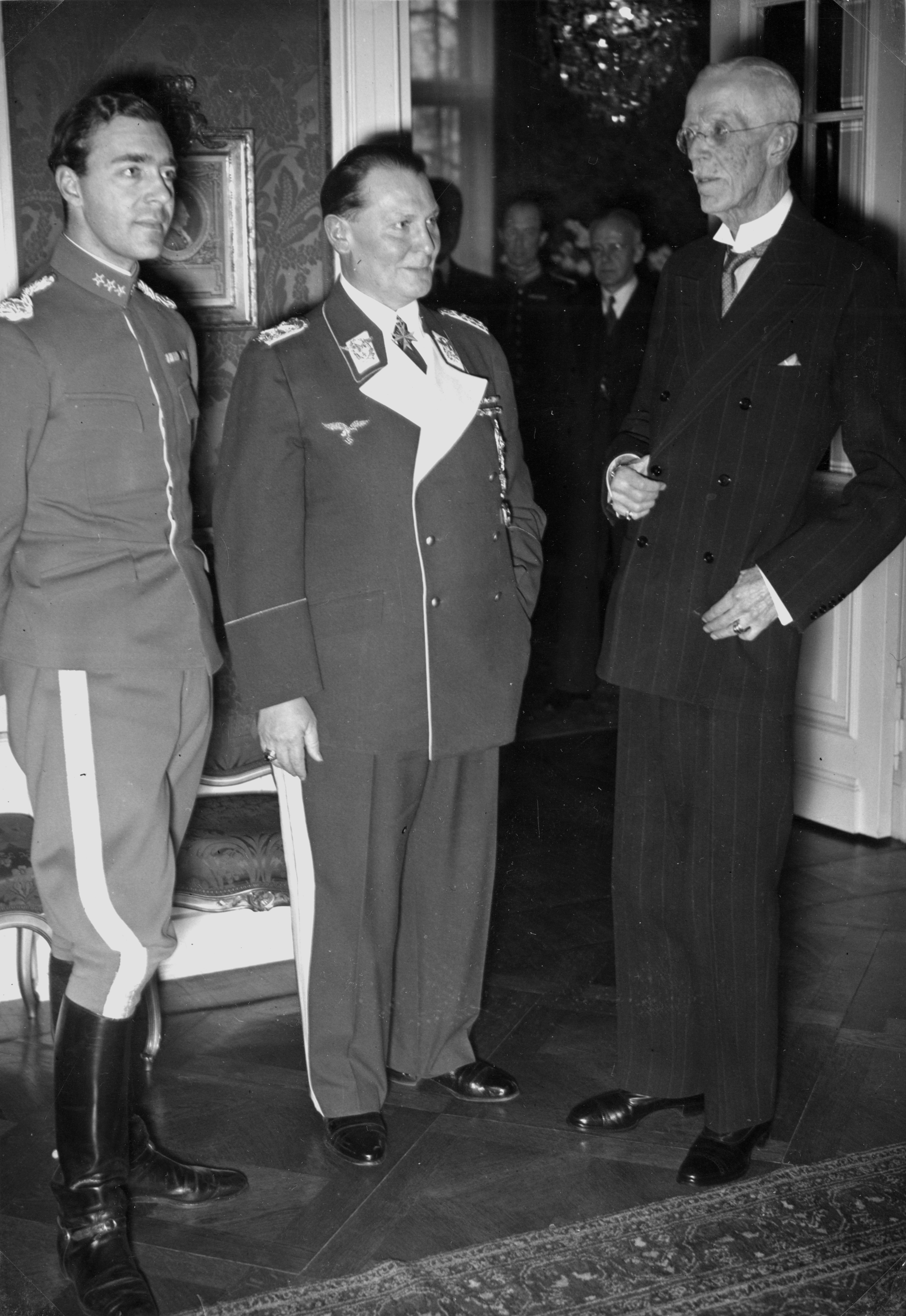
Prince Gustaf Adolf, Hermann Göring, and King Gustaf V in Berlin, February 1939

Both the King and his grandson Prince Gustaf Adolf socialised with Nazi leaders before World War II, though arguably for diplomatic purposes. During a visit to Berlin, according to historian Jörgen Weibull, Gustaf V attempted to convince Hitler to soften his persecution of the Jews. He was also noted for appealing to Miklós Horthy, leader of the Kingdom of Hungary, to save its Jews "in the name of humanity".

When Nazi Germany invaded the Soviet Union in June 1941, Gustaf V tried to write a private letter to Hitler thanking him for taking care of the "Bolshevik pest" and congratulating him on his "already achieved victories". He was stopped from doing so by Prime Minister Per Albin Hansson.

During the war Gustaf V invited Swedish Nazi leader Sven Olov Lindholm to Stockholm Palace. The King had friends in Lindholm's movement.

=== Midsummer crisis 1941 ===
According to Prime Minister Hansson, during the Midsummer crisis, the King in a private conversation had threatened to abdicate if the government did not approve a German request to transfer a German infantry division, the so-called Engelbrecht Division, through Swedish territory from southern Norway to northern Finland in June 1941, around Midsummer. The accuracy of the claim is debated, and the King's intention, if he really made the threat, is sometimes alleged to be his desire to avoid conflict with Germany. The event has received considerable attention from Swedish historians and is known as midsommarkrisen, the Midsummer Crisis.

Confirmation of the King's action is contained in German Foreign Policy documents captured at the end of the war. On 25 June 1941, the German Ambassador in Stockholm sent a "Most Urgent–Top Secret" message to Berlin in which he stated that the King had just informed him that the transit of German troops would be allowed. He added:

The King's words conveyed the joyful emotion he felt. He had lived through anxious days and had gone far in giving his personal support to the matter. He added confidentially that he had found it necessary to go so far as to mention his abdication.

== Personal life ==
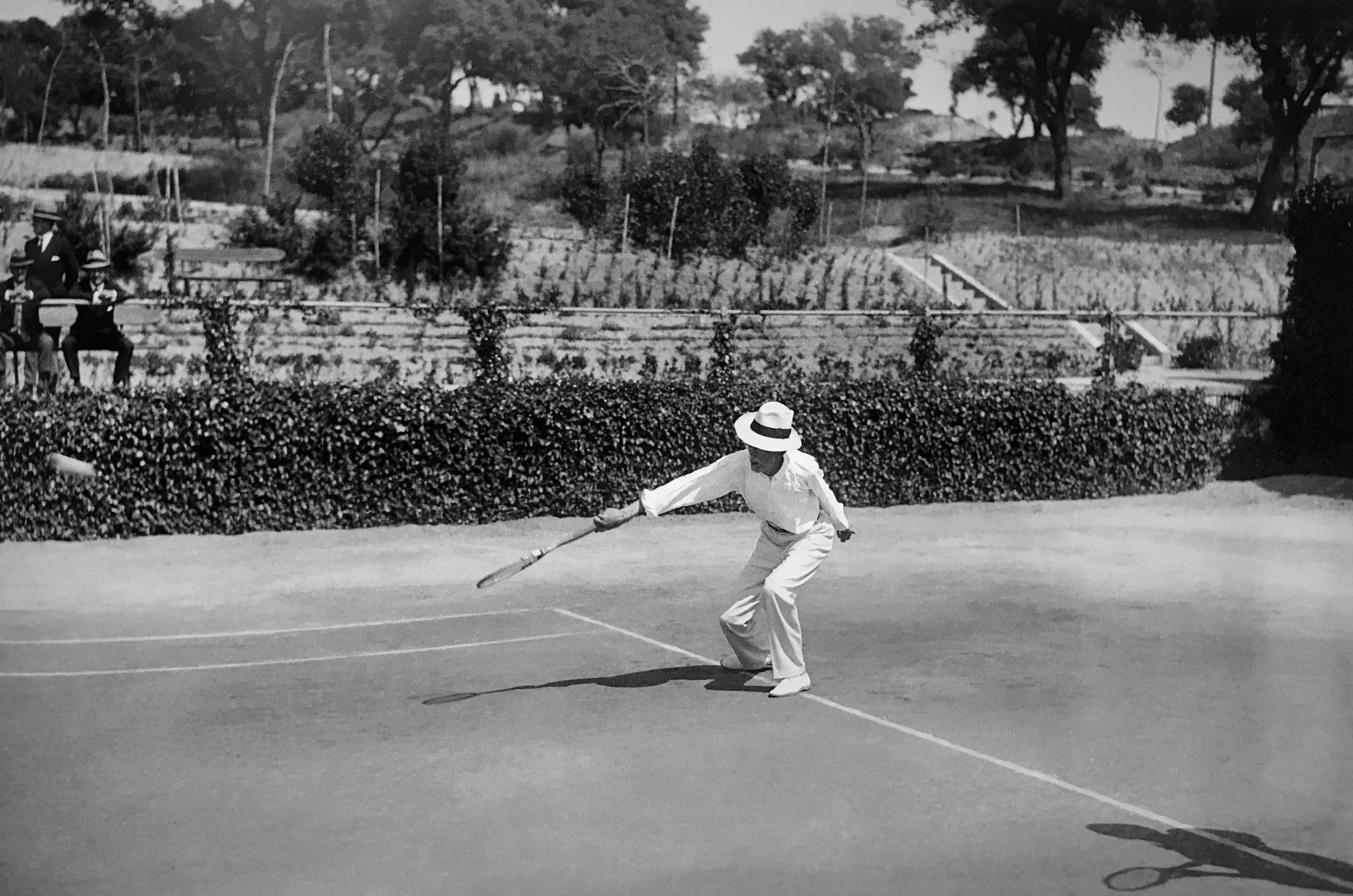
Gustaf V playing tennis at Real Club de la Puerta de Hierro, 1927

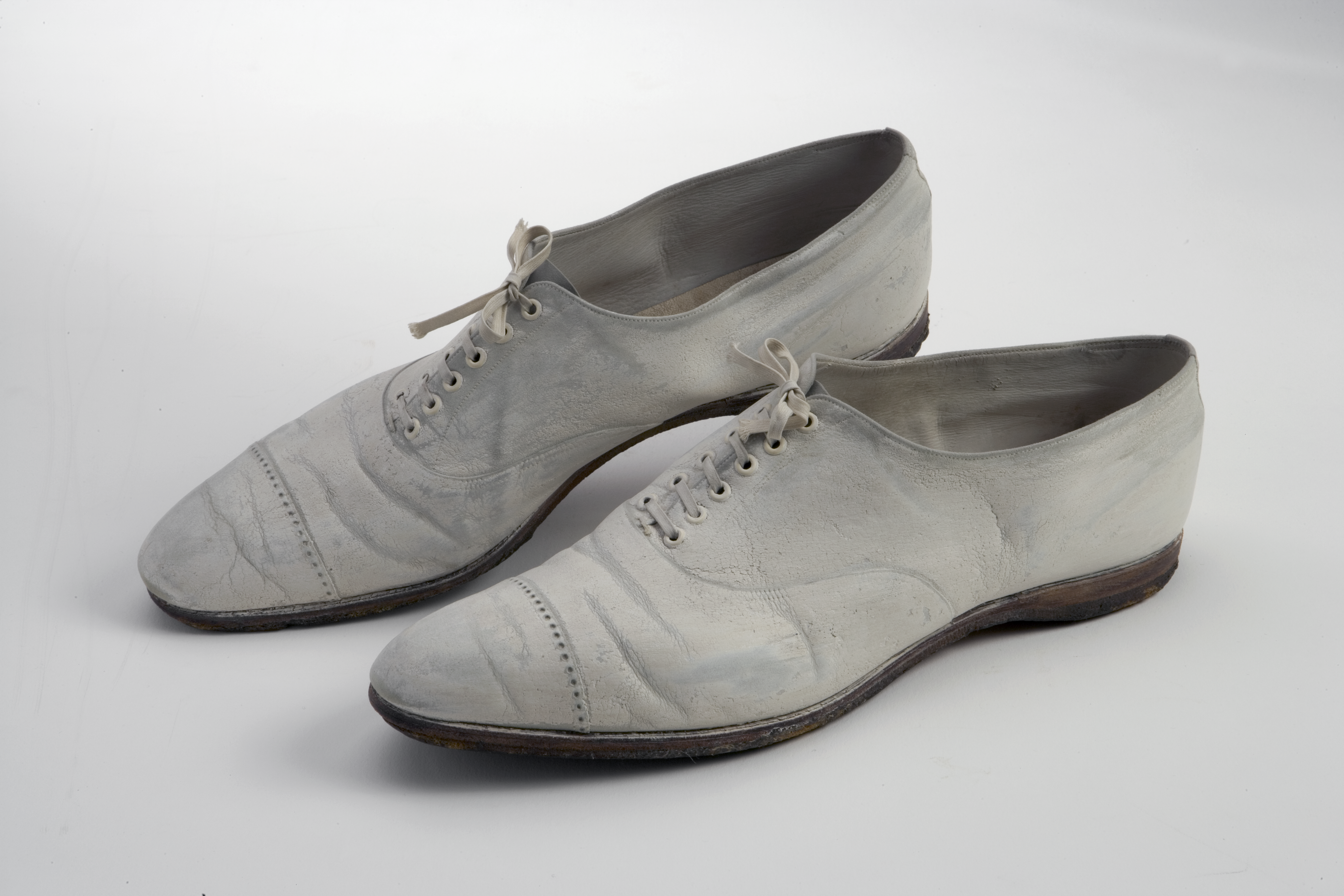
Tennis shoes worn by Gustaf V.

Gustaf V was thin, and known for his height. He wore pince-nez eyeglasses and sported a pointed mustache for most of his teen years.

Gustaf V was a devoted tennis player, appearing under the pseudonym Mr G. As a player and promoter of the sport, he was elected to the International Tennis Hall of Fame in 1980. The King learned to play tennis during a visit in Britain in 1876 and founded Sweden's first tennis club on his return home. In 1936 he founded the King's Club. During his reign, Gustaf was often seen playing on the Riviera. On a visit to Berlin, Gustaf went straight from a meeting with Hitler to a tennis match with the Jewish player Daniel Prenn. During World War II, he interceded to obtain better treatment for Davis Cup star Jean Borotra of France, and in 1938 on behalf of his personal trainer and friend Baron Gottfried von Cramm of Germany, who had been imprisoned by the Nazi Government on the charge of a homosexual relationship with a Jew.

=== Haijby affair ===
Allegations of a homosexual love affair between Gustaf V and Kurt Haijby led to the court paying 170,000 kronor under the threat of blackmail by Haijby. That led to the so-called Haijby Affair and several controversial trials and convictions against Haijby, which spawned considerable controversy about Gustaf V's alleged homosexuality.

In 2021 the alleged events surrounding the Haijby Affair were adapted into a fictional miniseries for Sveriges Television called En Kunglig Affär (A Royal Secret), directed by Lisa James Larsson and written by Bengt Braskered.

== Death ==
After a reign of nearly 43 years, Gustaf V died in Stockholm of acute bronchitis with bronchiectasis on 29 October 1950. His 67-year-old son Gustaf succeeded him as Gustaf VI Adolf.

He made his last official appearance at a cabinet meeting on October 27, 1950, two days before he died.

== Honours ==
National honours

- Knight and Commander of the Seraphim, 16 June 1858
- Knight of the Order of Charles XIII, 16 June 1858
- Commander Grand Cross of the Sword, 16 June 1858
- Commander Grand Cross of the Polar Star, 16 June 1858
- Commander Grand Cross of the Order of Vasa, 12 July 1886
- Honorary Member of the Johanniter Order

Foreign military ranks

- Denmark: General à la suite in the Royal Danish Army, 1909
- Russian Empire: Admiral à la suite in the Imperial Russian Navy, 1909
- United Kingdom of Great Britain and Ireland: Honorary Admiral in the Royal Navy, 3 November 1908.
- German Empire: General à la suite in the Imperial German Army, 1909
- German Empire: Admiral à la suite in the Imperial German Navy, 1909
- Restoration (Spain): Admiral à la suite in the Spanish Navy, 1928
- German Empire: Honorary commander of the third Life Grenadier Regiment "Königin Elisabeth", 1909

Foreign honours

- Norway:
  - Grand Cross of St. Olav, with Collar, 16 June 1858
  - Knight of the Norwegian Lion, 21 January 1904
  - King Haakon VII Freedom Cross
- Denmark:
  - Knight of the Elephant, 22 June 1874
  - Cross of Honour of the Order of the Dannebrog, 18 November 1912
  - Grand Commander of the Dannebrog, in Diamonds, 29 October 1950
- Hungary:
  - Kingdom of Hungary: Grand Cross of the Royal Hungarian Order of St. Stephen, 1879
  - Regency Hungary: Grand Cross of the Order of Merit, with Holy Crown and Collar
- Kingdom of Italy:
  - Knight of the Annunciation, 24 February 1879
  - Grand Cross of Saints Maurice and Lazarus, 24 February 1879
- Restoration (Spain): Knight of the Golden Fleece, 30 June 1881
- (Thailand) Siam: Knight of the Order of the Royal House of Chakri, 13 July 1897
- United Kingdom of Great Britain and Ireland:
  - Honorary Grand Cross of the Bath (civil), 19 February 1901
  - Knight of the Garter, 13 June 1905
  - Recipient of the Royal Victorian Chain, 27 April 1908
- Austria: Grand Cross of the Decoration of Honour for Services to the Republic of Austria
- Belgium: Grand Cordon of the Order of Leopold
- Brazil: Grand Cross of the Southern Cross
- Chile: Collar of the Order of Merit
- China: Order of Propitious Clouds, 1st Class
- Czechoslovakia: Collar of the White Lion, 1937
- Kingdom of Egypt: Collar of the Order of Muhammad Ali
- Estonia:
  - Cross of Liberty, Grade III Class I, 29 April 1925
  - Collar of the White Star, 7 June 1938
- Ethiopian Empire: Collar of the Order of Solomon, 1945
- Finland: Grand Cross of the White Rose, with Collar, 1919
- German Empire:
  - Knight of the Black Eagle, 6 February 1873; with Collar
  - Grand Cross of the Red Eagle
  - Grand Commander's Cross of the Royal House Order of Hohenzollern, 10 March 1881
  - Baden:
    - Knight of the House Order of Fidelity, 1881
    - Knight of the Order of Berthold the First, 1881
  - Kingdom of Bavaria: Knight of St. Hubert, 1879
  - (Saxe-Coburg and Gotha) (Duchy of Saxe-Altenburg) (Saxe-Meiningen) Ernestine duchies: Grand Cross of the Saxe-Ernestine House Order
  - (Grand Duchy of Hesse) Hesse and by Rhine: Grand Cross of the Ludwig Order, 20 September 1881
  - Mecklenburg: Grand Cross of the Wendish Crown, with Crown in Ore and Collar
  - (Duchy of Nassau) Nassau Ducal Family: Knight of the Gold Lion of Nassau
  - Oldenburg: Grand Cross of the Order of Duke Peter Friedrich Ludwig, with Golden Crown and Collar
  - Saxe-Weimar-Eisenach: Grand Cross of the White Falcon, 1881
  - Kingdom of Saxony: Knight of the Rue Crown, 1888
  - Württemberg: Grand Cross of the Württemberg Crown, 1879
- Greece: Grand Cross of the Redeemer
- Iran:
  - Qajar dynasty: House Order of the Imperial Effigy, 1st Class
  - Pahlavi dynasty: Collar of the Order of Pahlavi
- Kingdom of Iraq: Grand Collar of the Order of the Hashimites
- Kingdom of Hawaii: Knight's Grand Cross of the Royal Order of Kalākaua, 1881
- Empire of Japan: Grand Cordon of the Order of the Chrysanthemum, 29 July 1881
- Latvia: Commander Grand Cross of the Order of the Three Stars, with Collar
- Monaco: Grand Cross of St. Charles, 6 April 1875
- Netherlands: Grand Cross of the Netherlands Lion
- Ottoman Empire:
  - Order of Distinction
  - Order of Osmanieh, 1st Class
- Peru: Grand Cross of the Sun of Peru, in Diamonds, 1923
- Poland: Knight of the White Eagle, 15 June 1928
- Kingdom of Portugal:
  - Grand Cross of the Tower and Sword
  - Grand Cross of the Sash of the Three Orders
- Kingdom of Romania:
  - Grand Cross of the Star of Romania
  - Grand Cross of the Crown of Romania
  - Collar of the Order of Carol I
- Russian Empire:
  - Knight of St. Andrew, 1881
  - Knight of St. Alexander Nevsky
  - Knight of the White Eagle
  - Knight of St. Anna, 1st Class
  - Knight of St. Stanislaus, 1st Class
- Venezuela: Collar of the Order of the Liberator
- Kingdom of Yugoslavia: Grand Cross of the Star of Karađorđe

=== Arms ===
Upon his creation as Duke of Värmland, Gustaf V was granted a coat of arms with the Arms of Värmland in base. Upon his accession to the throne, he assumed the Arms of Dominion of Sweden.

Arms as crown prince from 1872 to 1905

Arms as crown prince from 1905 to 1907

Greater Coat of Arms of Sweden

Royal Monogram of King Gustaf V of Sweden

== Issue ==
Name	Birth	Death	Notes
Gustaf VI Adolf of Sweden	11 November 1882	15 September 1973	Married 1) Princess Margaret of Connaught (1882–1920), had issue (including Ingrid, Queen of Denmark); Married 2) Lady Louise Mountbatten (1889–1965), had issue (a stillborn daughter)
Prince Wilhelm, Duke of Södermanland	17 June 1884	5 June 1965	Married Grand Duchess Maria Pavlovna of Russia (1890–1958), had issue
Prince Erik, Duke of Västmanland	20 April 1889	20 September 1918	Died unmarried of the Spanish flu, no issue

Swedish author Anders Lundebeck (1900–1976) allegedly was an extramarital son of King Gustaf V, an allegation purported by Lundebeck himself and to some extent supported by existing facts.

== Gallery ==
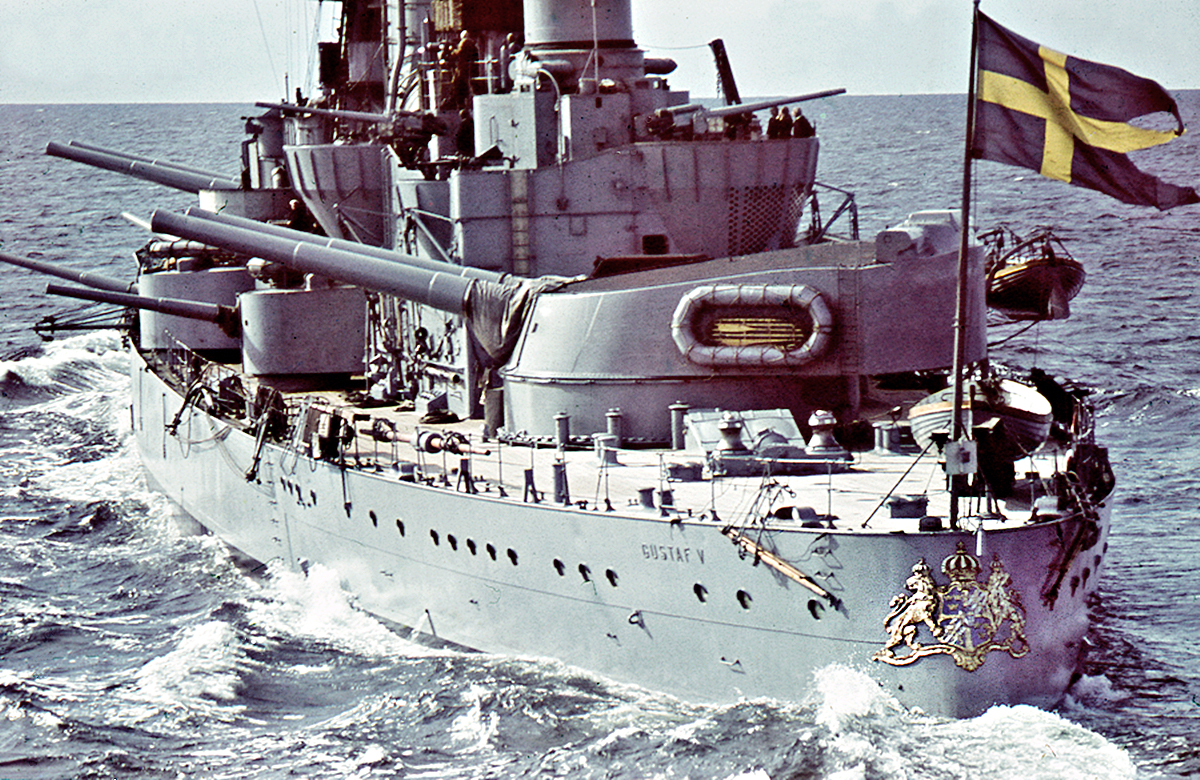
Swedish coastal defence ship HM Pansarskepp Gustaf V (1922–1957).

Gustaf V House of Bernadotte Born: 16 June 1858 Died: 29 October 1950
Regnal titles
Preceded by Oscar II	King of Sweden; 1907–1950	Succeeded by Gustaf VI Adolf
Royal titles
Vacant Title last held by Charles	Crown Prince of Sweden; 1872–1907	Succeeded by Gustaf Adolf
Vacant Title last held by Charles	Crown Prince of Norway; 1872–1905	Vacant Title next held by Olav
Vacant Title last held by Carl Adolf	Duke of Värmland; 1858–1907	Vacant Title next held by Carl Philip
Political offices
Vacant Title last held by Carl	Viceroy of Norway; 1884	Vacant
Awards and achievements
Preceded by Sir Cyril Newall	Cover of Time magazine 30 October 1939	Succeeded by Tom Harmon
