= Courtyard Crisis =

Swedish government crisis

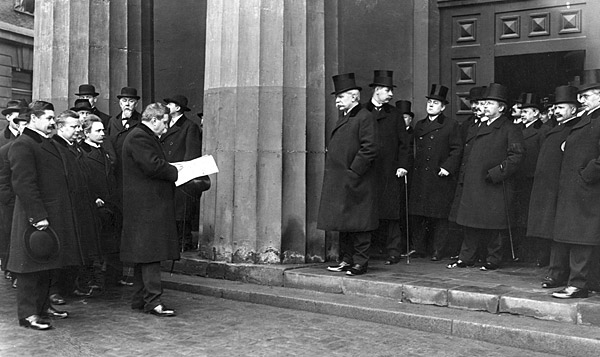
Karl Staaff received support from the Social Democrats during the Courtyard Crisis. Here Staaff (immediately to the right of the pillar) stands in front of his ministry outside the chancellery gate and listens to the Social Democratic opposition's declaration of loyalty in connection with the Workers' march on February 8, 1914, two days after the Peasant armament support march. Hjalmar Branting, with the letter in hand, is the Social Democrats' party leader and spokesman.

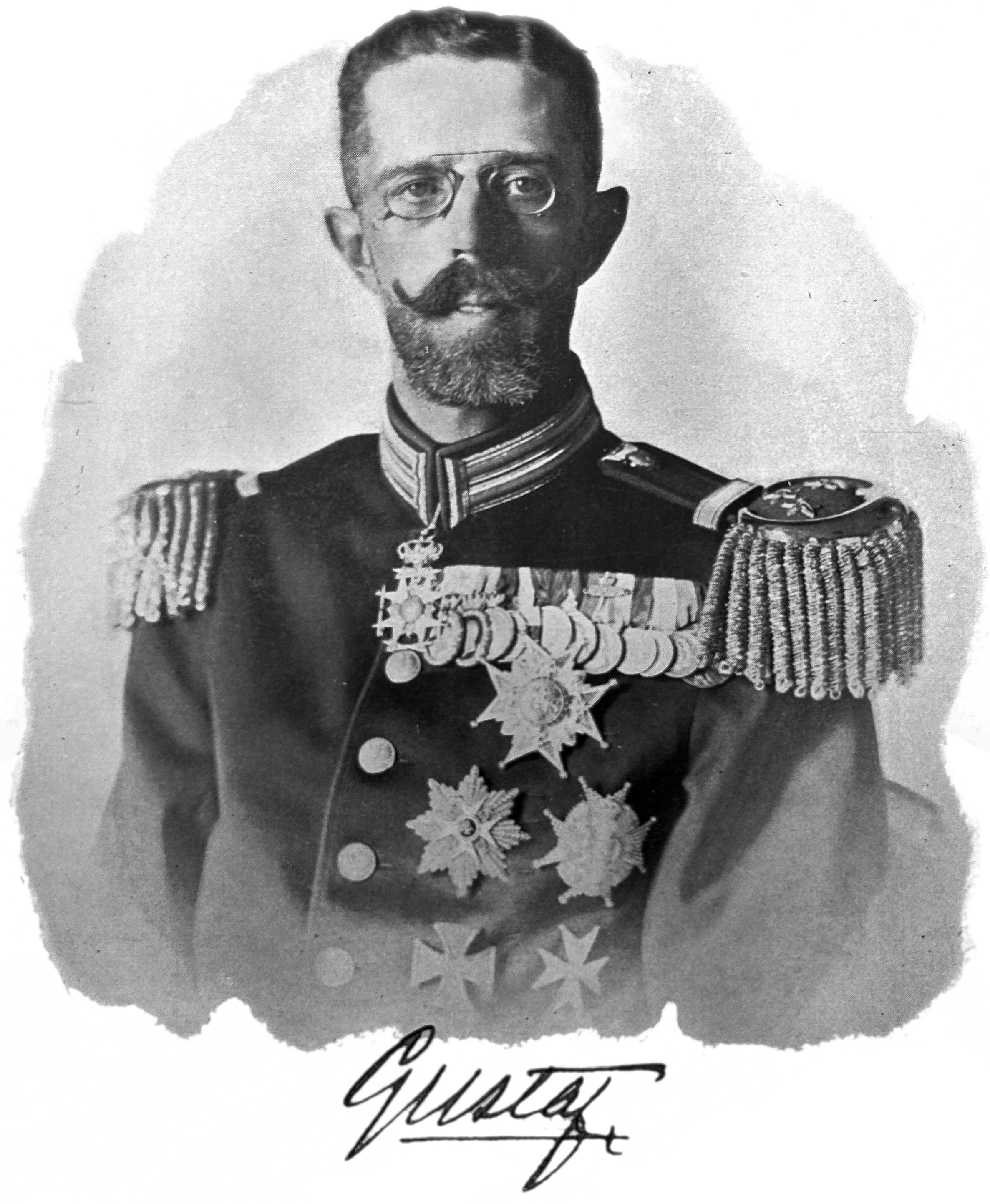
Gustaf V, King of Sweden, in 1911.

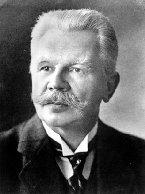
Karl Staaff.

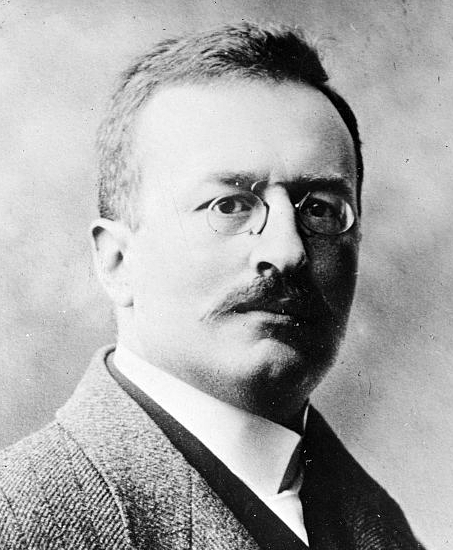
Sven Hedin.

The Courtyard Crisis (Swedish: Borggårdskrisen) was a constitutional conflict between Sweden's king Gustaf V and the Liberal prime minister Karl Staaff.

The crisis has been seen as the culmination of the struggle between the pro-king conservatives and the pro-parliamentary forces. It was rooted in differing views on how much money should be spent on defense – Gustaf V advocated higher funding than the government. World War I broke out in July 1914, six months after the Courtyard Speech, and united the parties on the defense issue.

== Context ==
In 1909, universal and equal suffrage for men was introduced in the elections to the Andra kammaren (The Second Chamber of Parliament), significantly increasing the number of eligible voters to 1 million. This was a development that conservative political forces saw as threatening and wanted to stop. The right to vote in the Första kammaren (The First Chamber of Parliament) had also been extended after the 1909 reform – from 4,000 to 40 votes for the richest – but was still weighted, which meant that the conservatives continued to control the Första kammaren. The king and the conservatives thus had not only the will but also the opportunity to slow down the development towards greater democracy and parliamentarism.

In 1911, the liberal Karl Staaff formed a liberal government with the support of the Social Democrats, not least because new groups of voters with liberal and social democratic sympathies were given the opportunity to vote. The differences between the right and the left were already very great, and with the election of Staaff as prime minister, the differences deepened further. A major issue that the Liberals had pushed in their election program was to reduce defense spending. In 1911, more than half of the state budget was spent on defense, compared to 5.8% of the state budget in 2021. The right-wing government under Arvid Lindman that preceded Staaff's government had decided to build several new armored boats to expand the Swedish defense. With the Liberal election victory, the construction of the boats was stopped, which led to strong criticism from conservative quarters. The conservative reaction included right-wing politicians, the conservative newspapers, the military, the church and nationalist commentators.

The Ungkyrkorörelsen ("Young Church Movement") and the Conservatives each started their own private armored boat collection. Sven Hedin's book Ett varningsord ("A word of warning") was published in 1912 in a million copies. The book warned of Russia and described the horrors of an imaginary Russian occupation. The pro-king arguments followed the pattern of aggressive nationalism that was a common European phenomenon at the time. Down in Europe, the zeitgeist helped lower the threshold for the outbreak of violence in 1914. For Sweden, this meant a mixture of national romanticism, passion for Charles XII and fear of Russia. Attacks on Staaff were very vicious, from allegations of treason to the sale of ashtrays with Staaff's face on them.

Micaela Edhager had argued that courtyard crisis also reflected a confrontation between two different ideas of how Sweden's political system should be arranged, a monarchial one vs a parliamentary system.

== Peasant armament support march ==
On December 21, 1913, Staaff relented and, against the background of increasing international tension, advocated in a speech the expansion of the navy and investments in the army. On the same day, there was a call for a peasant march in support of defense. The king's speech to the 30,000 farmers (The Courtyard Speech, Borggårdstalet, February 6, 1914) was a rhetorical masterpiece in the spirit of the times, written by Sven Hedin with the support of General Staff Officer Carl Bennedich. The king more or less distanced himself from the Staaff government, while at the same time asserting the personal power of the king, and thus the right to act as supreme commander. Contemporaries suspected that the speech had been written by Verner von Heidenstam, but this was not correct (see below).

The speech stated that the king demanded the right to dictate to the assembly what should be decided on matters of importance to him. He had spoken of "my army" and "my navy". Nor had he allowed the prime minister to read the speech in advance. The Social Democrats responded within a few days with a so-called workers' rally, with some 50,000 participants, in support of the Liberal government, under the slogan "The will of the people alone shall decide in the land of Sweden!"

=== Government crisis and aftermath ===
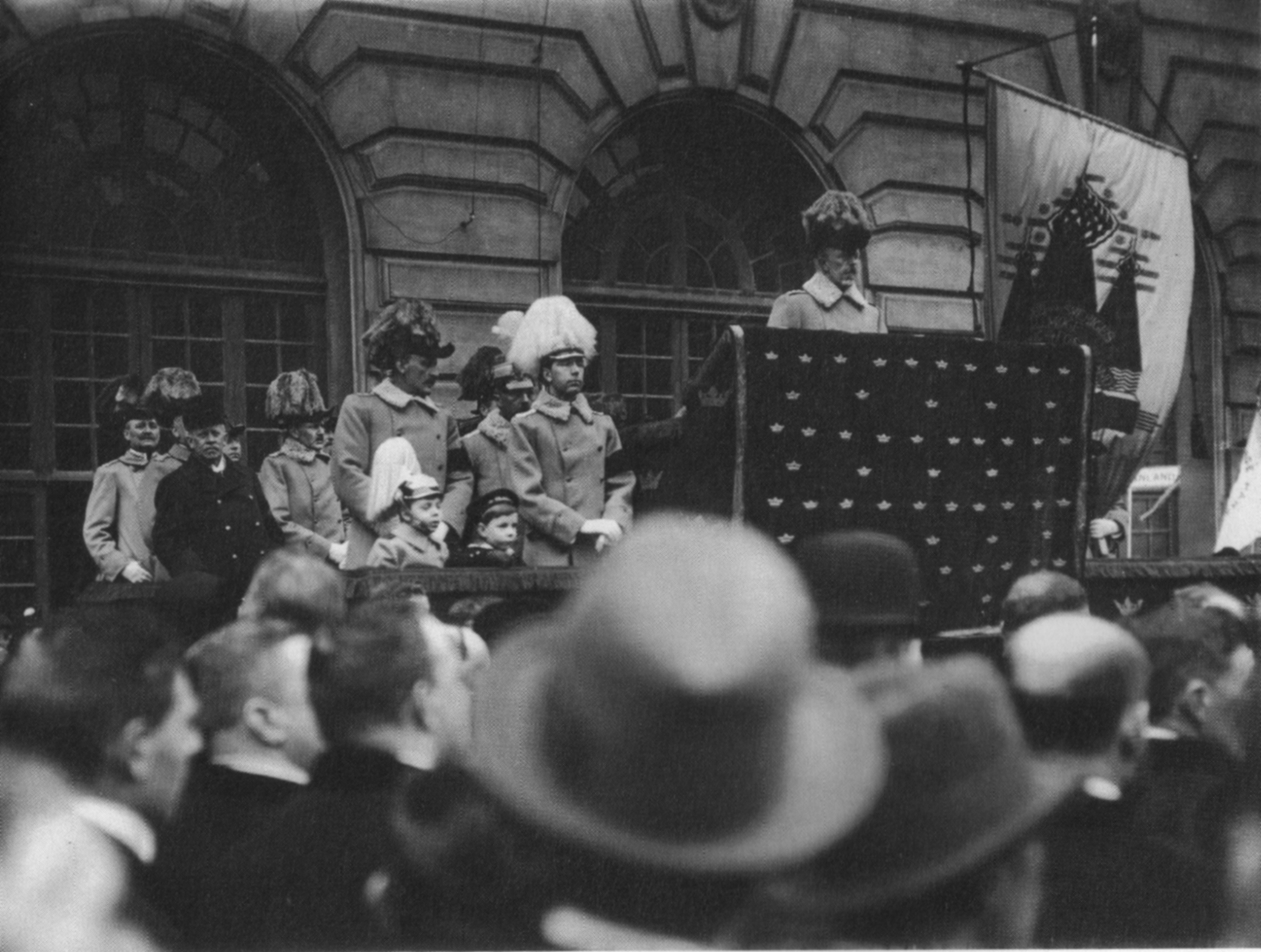
Gustaf V's speech in the courtyard of Stockholm Palace.

The king's Courtyard Speech could constitute a restriction of the power given to the government, which prompted the prime minister to ask him a number of questions shortly afterwards:

- Did the king maintain what he had said in his speech, that the defense issue must be resolved in accordance with the military's "inescapable demands"? That is, against the government's proposals.
- Had the king in any way taken into account any issue in the expected defense bill before the government had had the opportunity to present the matter to him?

The answers were not satisfactory to the government. Staaff then presented the king with a proposal for a royal statement that involved a retreat. In addition, Staaff demanded that in future the king should inform the prime minister or the minister responsible in advance when the king made statements on political issues. Finally, the government threatened to resign unless the king could "graciously grant these wishes". These exchanges of correspondence between the king and Staaff were of course not public. However, the king responded publicly, referring to Staaff's proposals, which he considered impertinent, and declaring that he could not agree to this arrangement "as I do not wish to relinquish the right to communicate freely with the people of Sweden" – a response that brought the constitutional conflict to a head and showed that the king had no intention of giving in.

=== Government resignation ===
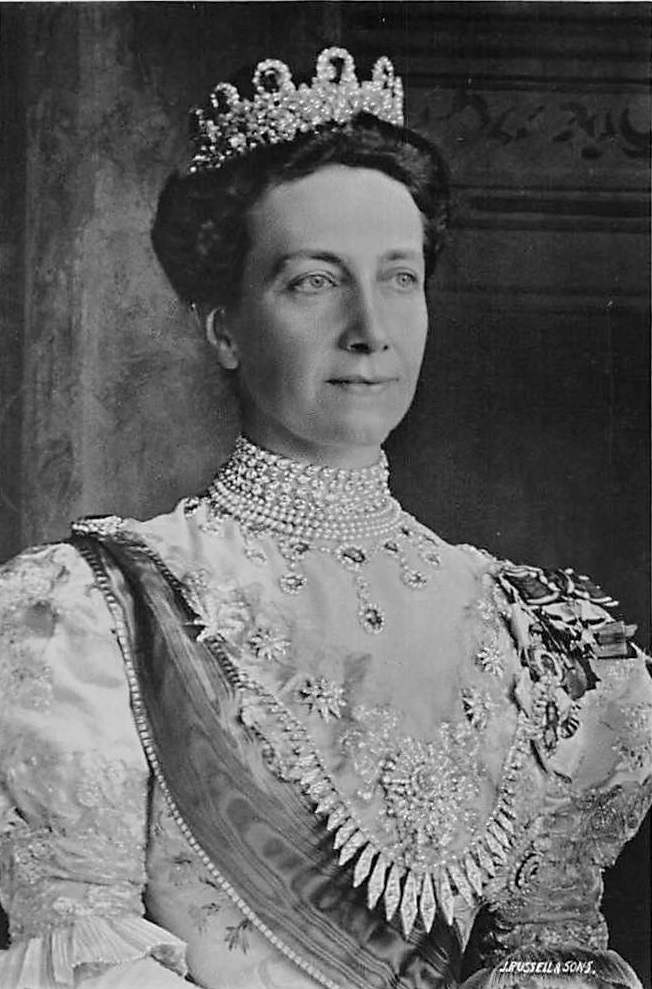
Queen Victoria of Sweden.

The Liberal government resigned as a consequence on February 10.

The leaders of the Liberal Party in the Riksdag expressed their almost universal solidarity with the minister and issued a manifesto stating that the political struggle had now become about "one of the foundations of all democratic politics; it concerns the self-government of the Swedish people". "The first main demand of the liberals: a parliamentary system of government, with the country's government based on the confidence of the people's representation, is thus jeopardized," they wrote.

The Conservative Party leadership, on the other hand, focused its manifesto primarily on the threatening foreign policy situation, which had led other peoples to "submit to the greatest personal and economic sacrifices in order to increase still further their defensive power". The manifesto continued: "Our people, faced with the gravity of the world situation, have no time to dwell on fruitless but grueling constitutional battles. The life of the realm demands that the question of our defense be settled now, without delay and in a coherent manner." As for the substance of the constitutional conflict itself, the Conservatives took the king's position: that he could not agree to the government's demands because it "would deprive him of a right that every Swedish citizen possesses".

In the manifesto of the Social Democratic Party, the constitutional conflict was described as "a struggle for or against the personal royal power in our country". "A court camarilla", it said, "which counts among its ranks notorious agitators against the power of the Riksdag over state life, has pushed the king to the unconstitutional step of proclaiming a personal policy on the question of armaments." This, according to the party, meant "a relapse into the position of royal autocracy" and was contrary to the deepest meaning of the advance of democracy in recent decades. On the question of defense, the Social Democrats advocated a reduction, rather than an increase, in defense costs and the training time of conscripts. Instead, the emphasis was on social reforms that promoted the material and cultural development of the whole people as "indispensable elements of a capable defense for our independence and our future prospects".

The king and his inner circle of advisers, including Queen Victoria, Marshal Ludvig Douglas, Ernst Trygger and Sven Hedin, had temporarily won, but it turned out that they had gone too far, even for the right wing of the Riksdag. Preparations for a new government were inadequate. The right-wing party under Arvid Lindman had not wanted to dismiss the government in this way, even though the right-wing press eagerly supported the move. There were rumors of a coup d'état, and similar ideas were discussed between Hedin and Bennedich in their correspondence later in 1914.

=== New Elections ===
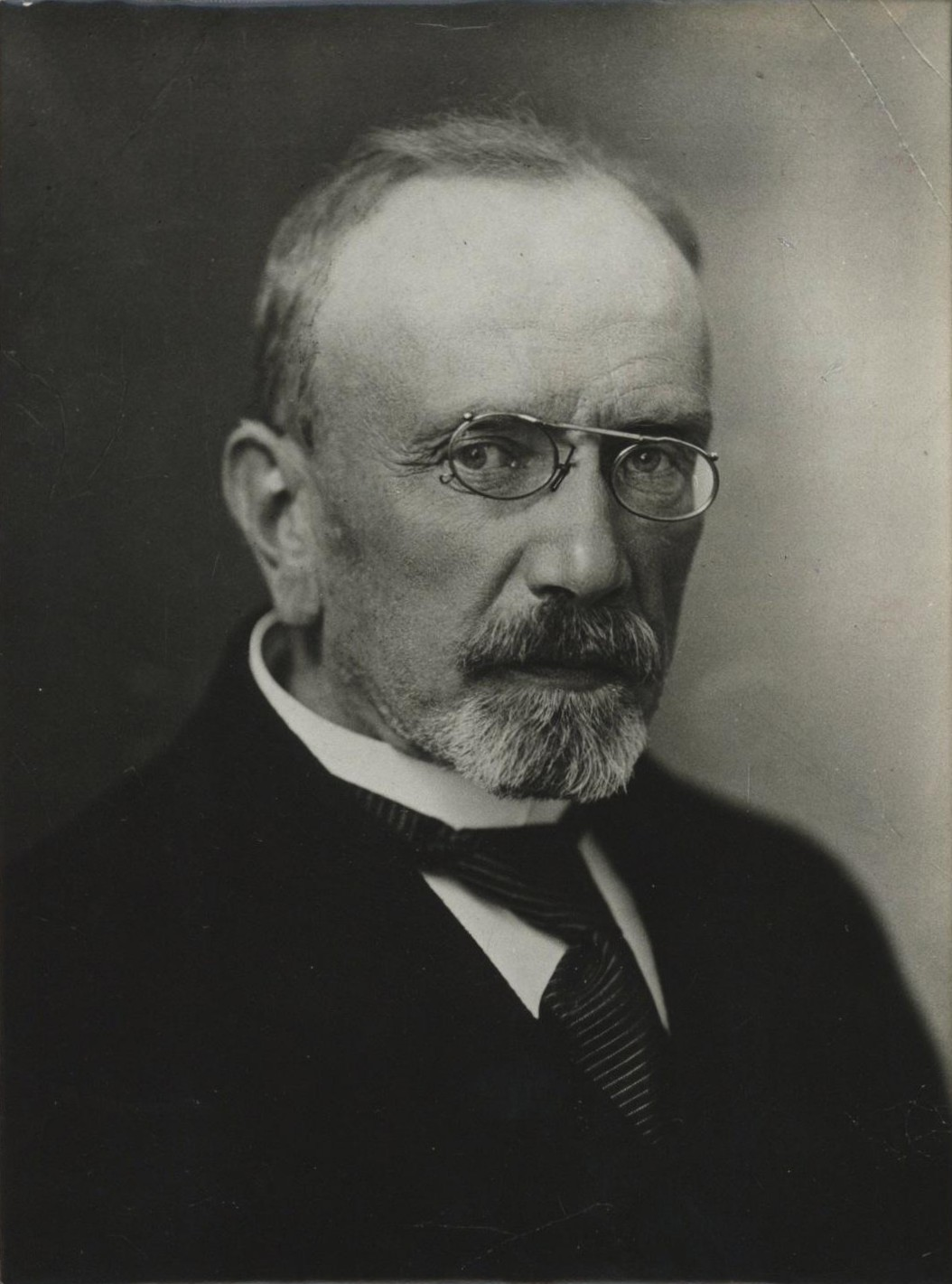
Hjalmar Hammarskjöld.

After a week, the government was succeeded by a government of civil-servants under the academic Hjalmar Hammarskjöld. This "courtyard government" decided to dissolve the second chamber immediately and call new elections so that the people could have their say on the question of defense. In the conference where these decisions were taken, the king finally declared: "I wish to take this opportunity to declare that any desire or aspiration towards a personal royal power has been, is and always will be alien to me. Following the commandments of the Constitution and in its spirit, I have, true to my motto, hitherto exercised my royal vocation. From my firm resolve to continue to do so, I will never waver."

In the elections that followed the resignation of the government, the electorate became polarized. The Liberals fell back while the Right and the Social Democrats made strong gains. A few years later, universal and equal suffrage had prevailed and parliamentarism was implemented.

The government's program included a continuous winter training for the infantry with 250 days of recruit school, plus four refresher exercises totaling 105 days. The navy was to be reinforced with seven additional F-type armoured boats and more powerful destroyers and submarines. The Liberal program was now specified in terms of infantry training time to be increased by 40 days. The government's program received unexpectedly large support, but although the opponents lost several seats in parliament, they still had the majority at their disposal.

Then, at the end of July 1914, the Great World War broke out. It was now clear to all parties that the most important thing was to show the world that the entire Swedish people were united in the decision to defend themselves with all their might. Both the Liberal and the Social Democratic party leaders now contributed to a solution of the defense question, which they had previously felt they had to fight. Under the impression of the impending danger, they spoke exhorting words of national unity to their fellow citizens. As early as August 8, Staaff was able to inform Hammarskjöld that the government's proposal on infantry training time could now count on such support from the Liberal Party that it had the backing of a majority in the Riksdag. The government's proposal was also essentially approved on other points.

=== Heidenstam and The Courtyard Crisis ===
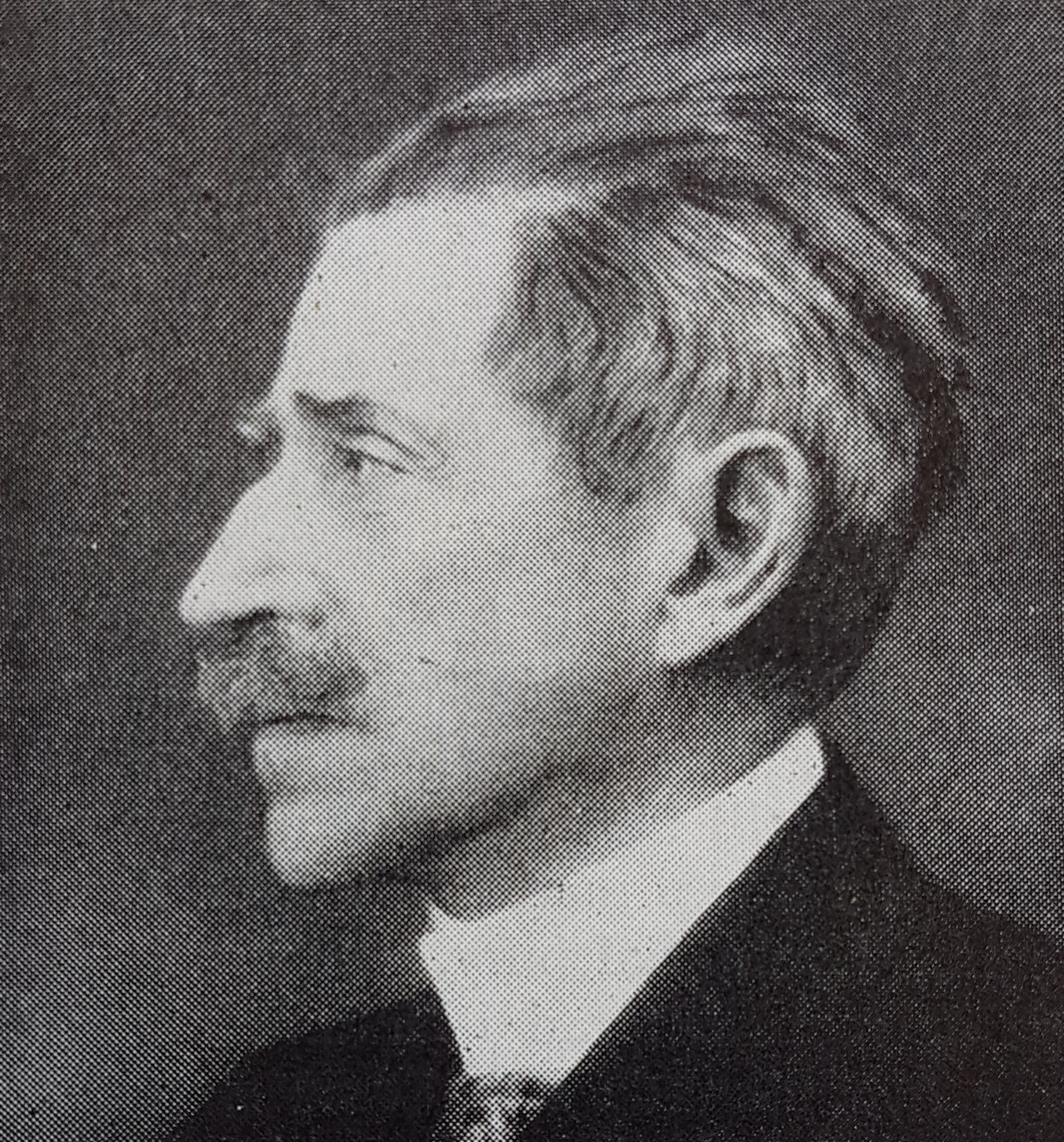
Verner von Heidenstam.

The author of the king's speech to the peasants was a well-kept secret for many years, and there was a persistent rumor that Verner von Heidenstam was behind the speech; this was repeated in newspapers and books well into the 1940s.

Hedin revealed in his book Försvarsstriden 1912-14 ("The defense battle") (1951) that he and Bennedich (who died in 1939) were the authors, and this is considered to be true even if it is not directly confirmed by other sources. Hedin and Bennedich had a lively correspondence at this time, partly in a conspiratorial tone with cover names for people etc. In the same book, Hedin claims that Heidenstam wrote another, shorter speech that the king gave to courting students, also in the Palace courtyard, and that this speech would have been reviewed by Ernst Trygger, the king's strongest ally in the Riksdag and the one he was expected to offer to form a government.

The speech was delivered on February 11, the day after the Staaff government had resigned. This information has been noted by Jan Stenkvist and Leif Kihlberg. Hedin, as Stenkvist points out, is not always credible, but he stated that he had learned this not from Heidenstam, a good friend since 1911, but from the parliamentarian and historian Karl Hildebrand, who in turn would have received the information from Gustaf V himself. There are indications that both this chain of sources and the factual information itself are correct and in that case it is the only occasion we know of when Heidenstam directly cooperated with the royal couple and a leading person in the right-wing radical group in the Riksdag on a political issue – Hedin was not a parliamentary politician. The Borggård crisis and the whole year 1914 are also the time when Heidenstam came closest to making direct nationally conservative statements in practical politics and in constitutional matters; his public statements on political issues were otherwise rhetorically effective but lacking in concrete meaning.

== Bibliography ==
- Simensen, Jarle; Åström, Kenneth (2001). Nationalencyklopedins världshistoria Band 12 (in Swedish). Malmö: Bra böcker. ISBN 91-7133-784-9.
- Franzén, Nils-Olof (1986). Undan stormen : Sverige under första världskriget (in Swedish). Stockholm: Bonnier. ISBN 9100469262.
- Olsson, Jan-Olof, ed. (1975). 1914. 1, Vårens oro (in Swedish). Stockholm. ISBN 91-0-040650-3.
- Carlsson, Sten; Rosén, Jerker, eds. (1979). Den Svenska Historien Band 14 (in Swedish). Stockholm: Bonnier. ISBN 91-34-42688-4.
- Grimberg, Carl (1985). Svenska folkets underbara öden / IX. Den sociala och kulturella utvecklingen från Oskar I:s tid till våra dagar samt De politiska förhållandena under Karl XV:s, Oscar II:s och Gustaf V:s regering 1859-1923 (in Swedish). Södertälje. ISBN 91-1-853442-2.
- Stenkvist, Jan (1982). Nationalskalden (in Swedish). Stockholm, Malmö: Norstedts. ISBN 9118233023.
