= Peasant armament support march =

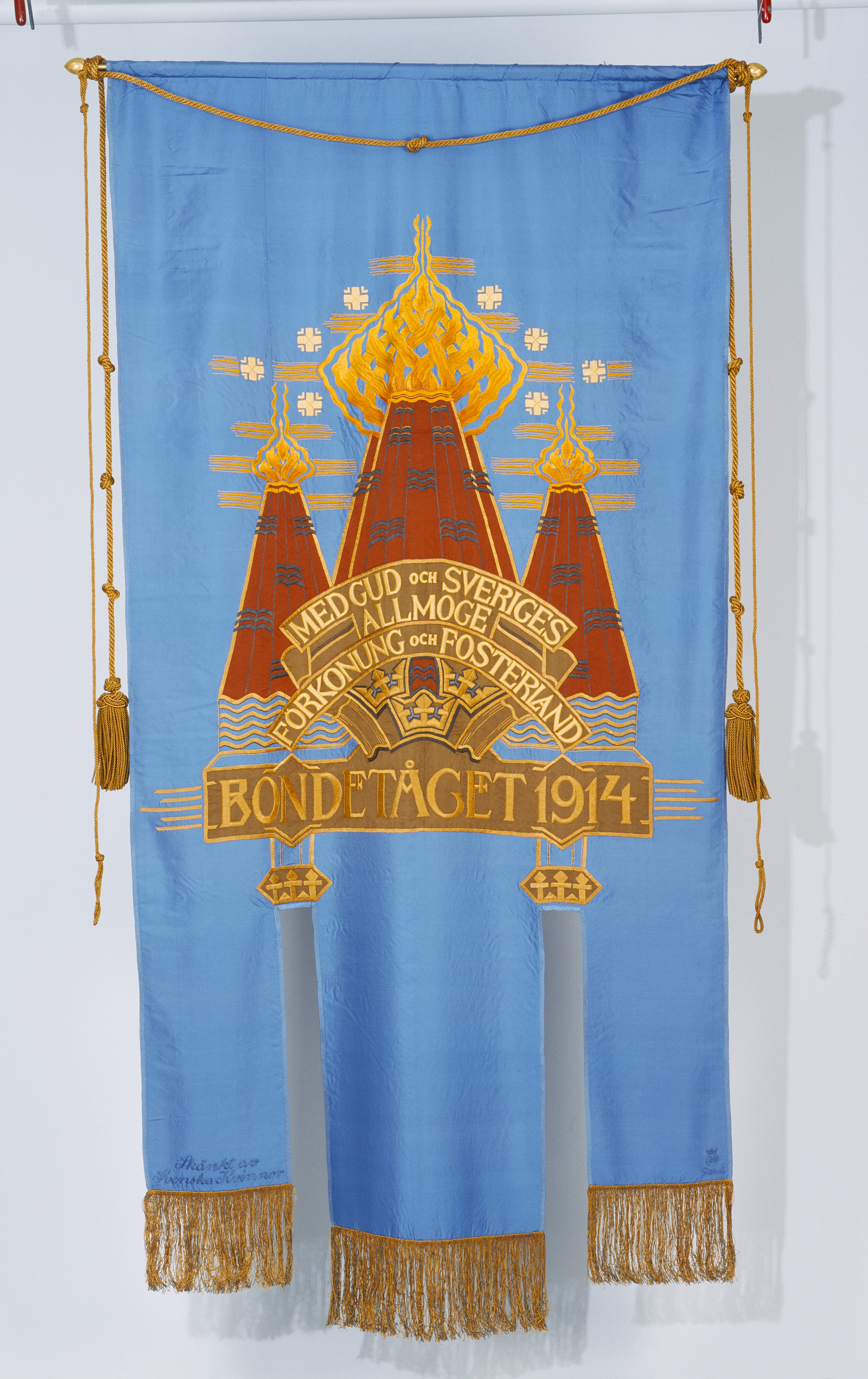
The main banner used in the march.

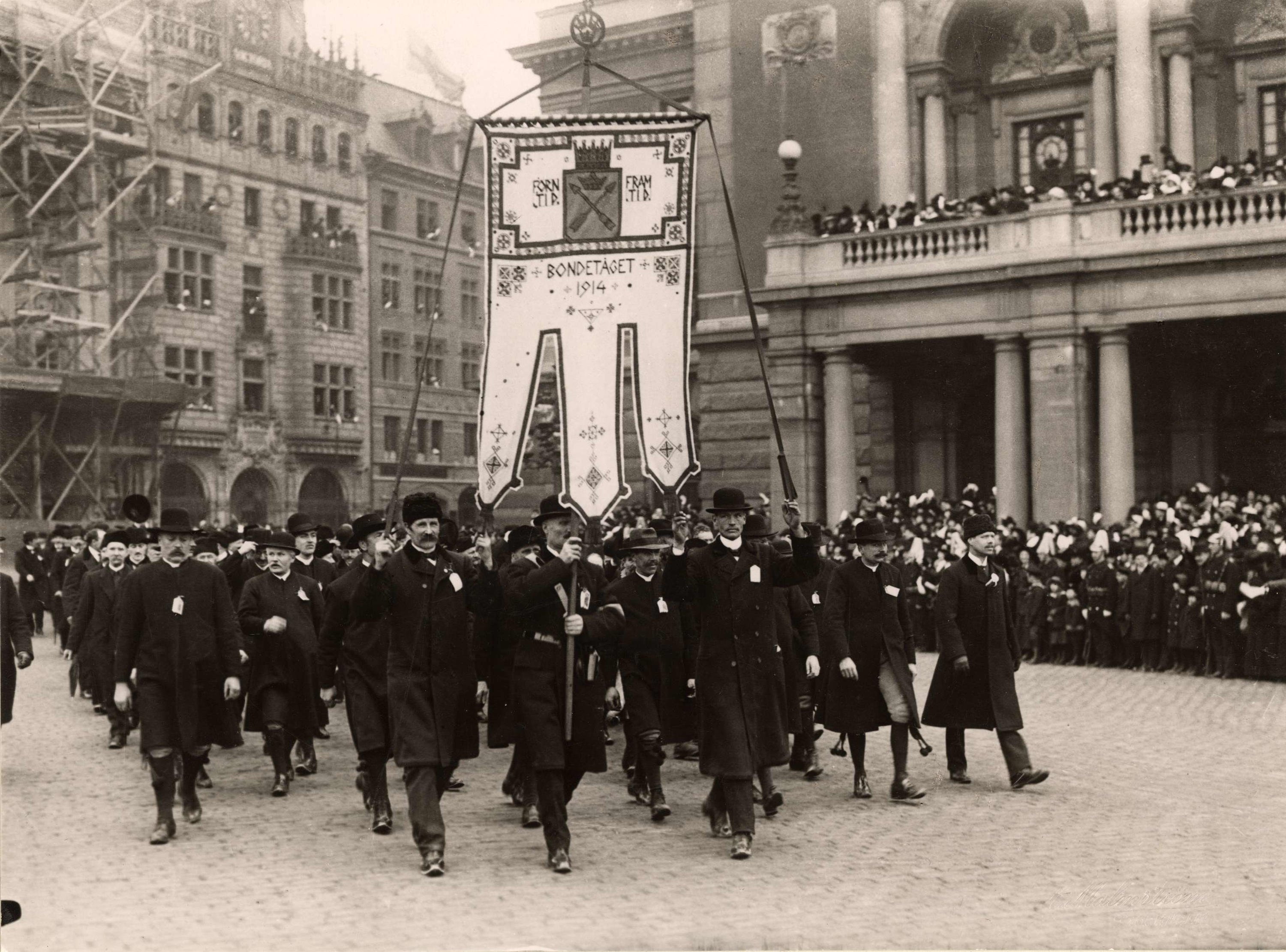
The peasant armament support march on Gustav Adolfs torg in Stockholm.

The peasant armament support march of 1914 (Swedish: Bondetåget) was a demonstration primarily of Swedish farmers on February 6, 1914 in Stockholm. It resulted in a constitutional crisis triggered by the Courtyard Speech held by King Gustav V to the marchers at Stockholm Palace. 30,000 participated in the march according to Britannica.

== Context ==
The support march was a conservative response to the defence policies of Swedish Liberal Prime Minister Karl Staaff. As the tensions of the arms race preceding the First World War grew stronger, Staaff's decision to slow down Swedish armament was met with great discontentment by conservatives.

== Organisation ==
The initiative of the march came from the landowner Uno Nyberg, and the organisation of housing and otherwise for the Swedish farmers that travelled to Stockholm for the march was carried out by the grocery shopowner J. E. Frykberg. Though called a farmers' march, participants came from a wider range of conservatives. The conservative explorer and writer Sven Hedin also participated in the preparation of the march by writing the Courtyard Speech.

== See also ==
- Courtyard crisis
