= Karl Rübel =

German general during World War II

- Born: 16 August 1895; Dortmund, German Empire
- Died: 8 March 1945 (aged 49); Schivelbein, Pomerania, Germany
- Military career
- Allegiance: Nazi Germany
- Branch: Army (Wehrmacht)
- Service years: 1914–1945
- Rank: Generalleutnant
- Commands: 163. Infanterie-Division
- Conflicts: East Pomeranian Offensive †
- Awards: Knight's Cross of the Iron Cross

Karl Rübel (16 August 1895 – 8 March 1945) was a German general during World War II. He was a recipient of the Knight's Cross of the Iron Cross of Nazi Germany. Rübel was killed on 8 March 1945 near Schivelbein, Pomerania, during the course of the Soviet East Pomeranian Offensive.

== Awards and decorations ==
- Knight's Cross of the Iron Cross on 13 January 1945 as Generalleutnant and commander of 163. Infanterie-Division

Military offices
Preceded by General der Infanterie Anton Dostler	Commander of 163. Infanterie-Division; 29 December 1942 – 8 March 1945	Succeeded by None
