= Midsummer crisis =

Swedish political crisis

The Midsummer crisis (Swedish: Midsommarkrisen) was a political crisis in Sweden after the beginning of Operation Barbarossa on 22 June 1941. Sweden's neutrality was tested when Nazi Germany and Finland demanded that Sweden allow the transit of the Wehrmacht's 163rd Infantry Division by railroad from Norway to Finland. After the 1939 German-Soviet invasion of Poland, Swedish prime minister Per Albin Hansson declared strict neutrality and called for the formation of a coalition government involving all major parties under his leadership; this was realized in December, with the exception of the Communist Party. With Spain, Portugal, Switzerland, Liechtenstein, Ireland and the Vatican, Sweden maintained neutrality throughout World War II and cooperated with both sides. According to Winston Churchill, during the war Sweden ignored the greater moral issues and played both sides for profit (particularly in the German occupation of Denmark and Norway, supported by transportation through Sweden sanctioned by Hansson's cabinet).

== Evolution ==
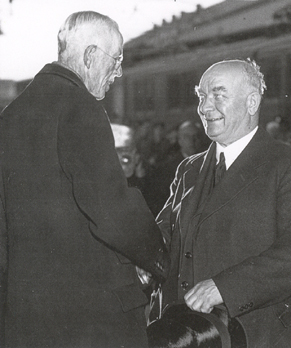
Gustaf V and Per Albin Hansson, two leading figures in the 1941 events

Operation Barbarossa, the 22 June 1941 German invasion of the Soviet Union, sparked an ultimatum by the government of Nazi Germany to Hansson's cabinet demanding military concessions (including German troop transports on Swedish railways to support German ally Finland). The political deliberations surrounding this ultimatum have become known as the "midsummer crisis", which (allegedly after King Gustav V's threat to abdicate if the concessions were not made) was resolved in favor of the Axis. Although the 83-year-old king had not directly intervened in government policy since 1914, Gustav had the formal power to appoint his own cabinet; his open intervention in the issue was seen as a threat to the stability of the government and, given the ongoing war, to the nation's sovereignty. However, according to research published in 2002 by Carl-Gustaf Scott "the crisis was created in historical hindsight in order to protect the political legacy of the Social Democratic Party and its leader Per Albin Hansson."

The Social Democratic Party and the Riksdag were divided on the issue. Hansson, implying that the king would abdicate if the German ultimatum was refused, succeeded in getting the Riksdag to make a decision acceptable to the other political parties. One reason for the approval was Finland's expected reaction to a denial; its security relied on outside support provided only by Germany. German Foreign Ministry official Karl Schnurre told Swedish Minister of Foreign Affairs Christian Günther that without an agreement, Finland would be drawn into the European conflict. The "midsummer crisis", highly publicized in 1941, was interpreted as a sign of King Gustav V's personal responsibility for Swedish weakness towards Nazi Germany.

The king's actions were confirmed by German foreign-policy documents captured at the end of the war. On 25 June 1941, the German minister in Stockholm sent a "Most Urgent-Top Secret" message to Berlin stating that the king had just informed him that the transit of German troops would be allowed:

The King's words conveyed the joyful emotion he felt. He had lived through anxious days and had gone far in giving his personal support to the matter. He added confidentially that he had found it necessary to go so far as to mention his abdication.

According to Ernst Wigforss, Gustaf V and Prince Gustav Adolf attempted to persuade the Swedish government to allow the Allies to transport troops through Sweden; this was rejected due to concerns about German retribution. The German-led invasion of the Soviet Union, Operation Barbarossa, commenced on 22 June 1941. Due to Germany's involvement with Finland, Soviet forces attacked Finland on 25 June. In response, Finland saw itself as being at war with the Soviet Union. Sweden subsequently did, in fact, begin rail transport of the German 163rd Infantry Division. As Scott has written, "Sweden's conduct was not impartial in the Nazi-Soviet conflict. The decision to allow belligerent troops transit across Sweden was a conspicuous breach of international law regarding the conduct of neutral states ... [and] remains a black spot in Swedish history, one which continues to prick Sweden's national conscience."
