= Carl Bennedich =

Swedish officer and military historian (1880-1939)

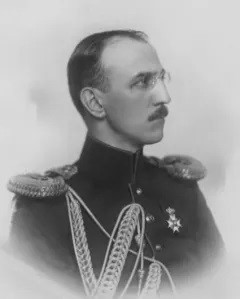
Carl Bennedich in 1919

Colonel Carl Bennedich (5 June 1880 – 3 March 1939) was a Swedish military officer and historian.

Bennedich was born in 1880 in Falkenberg to Lydia Johanna Lindstedt and Nils Peter Bengtsson. He joined the Swedish Army in 1899, and, in 1901, rose to the rank of second lieutenant in the Halland Battalion. That year, he was transferred to the North Scanian Infantry Regiment in Kristianstad. In 1904, he married Anna Signe Löndahl.

He joined the Topographical Department of the General Staff in 1904 and later attended the Royal Swedish Army Staff College from 1908 to 1910. Upon graduating in 1910, he entered the Officer Corps of the General Staff, and in 1914 he was admitted to the Military History Department. That year, he was involved in the Courtyard Crisis, during which he and the geographer Sven Hedin drafted King Gustaf V’s speech to 30,000 farmers protesting Prime Minister Karl Staaff's policies.

In 1916, he was promoted to captain in the North Scanian Infantry Regiment.

During his tenure in the Military History Department, he authored much of the four-volume work Karl XII på slagfältet and also contributed to the six-volume series Sveriges krig 1611–32.

Promoted to Colonel in 1932, he led the Västerbotten Regiment before commanding the Life Grenadier Regiment and the Eastern Brigade in 1937 respectively. He died two years later, in 1939.
