= 163rd Infantry Division (Wehrmacht) =

- German: 163. Infanterie-Division
- Active: November 1939–March 1945
- Country: Nazi Germany
- Branch: Army
- Type: Infantry
- Size: Division
- Engagements: World War II

The 163rd Infantry Division (German: 163. Infanterie-Division) was a German Army infantry division in World War II. Formed in November 1939, it was engaged in the invasion of Norway the following year. It fought alongside the Finnish Army during Operation Barbarossa against the Soviet Union. During this time, the division's transit through neutral Sweden caused the Midsummer Crisis of 1941. The division spent most of the war in Finland, before being returned to Germany. It was destroyed in March 1945 in Pomerania by the First Polish Army, subordinated to the Soviet 1st Belorussian Front.

== History ==
The 163rd Infantry Division was raised in November 1939. In April 1940 it was employed in the invasion of Norway, landing at Oslo, Kristiansand, Arendal, and Stavanger. It was troops from this division that were present on the heavy cruiser Blücher when it was sunk in the Battle of Drøbak Sound in the early hours of the invasion of Norway. Thereafter it remained on occupation duty in Norway until June 1941, when it was subordinated to the Finnish army to support operations along the River Svir during Operation Barbarossa.

In the early stages of Operation Barbarossa and the Continuation War the 163rd Division was to be transferred from Norway to Finland, and Sweden decided to allow safe transit of the division by railway through Swedish territory. The decision was in conflict with the Swedish neutrality-policy causing a political crisis (the "Midsummer Crisis" of 1941), and it raised many challenging questions about Sweden's neutrality during World War II. Today this remains a highly debated subject in Sweden and in the Nordic countries. The division was transferred 25 June to 12 July. In Swedish literature the division is better known as "Division Engelbrecht", after its commander at the time. The transport took the route Charlottenberg-Laxå-Hallsberg-Krylbo-Ånge-Vännäs-Boden-Haparanda.

In February 1942 it joined the German XXXVI Mountain Corps near Kandalaksha, and remained there until the Germans withdrew from Finland back into Norway in autumn 1944. In early 1945 it was transferred back to Germany, standing in reserve for a time at Berlin, then destroyed by the Soviets in Pomerania in March.

== Organization ==
Structure of the division:

- Headquarters
  - 307th Infantry Regiment
  - 310th Infantry Regiment
  - 324th Infantry Regiment
  - 234th Artillery Regiment
  - 234th Reconnaissance Battalion
  - 234th Tank Destroyer Battalion
  - 234th Engineer Battalion
  - 234th Signal Battalion
  - 234th Field Replacement Battalion
  - 234th Divisional Supply Group

== Commanding officers ==
- General der Artillerie Erwin Engelbrecht, 25 October 1939 – 15 June 1942
- General der Infanterie Anton Dostler, 15 June 1942 – 28 December 1942
- Generalleutnant Karl Rübel, 29 December 1942 – 8 March 1945

== See also ==
- Operation Weserübung
- Norwegian Campaign order of battle
- Continuation War
- German XXXVI Mountain Corps
- Division (military)
- Military unit
- List of German divisions in World War II
- Heer, Wehrmacht
