= Rasmussen Global =

Political consultancy firm in Brussels

- Type: Private
- Industry: Political Consultancy
- Headquarters: Copenhagen, Denmark
- Area served: Worldwide
- Key people: Anders Fogh Rasmussen (Founder); Fabrice Pothier (CEO)
- Website: rasmussenglobal.com

Rasmussen Global (RG) is an international political consultancy firm, headquartered in Brussels and Copenhagen. The firm was founded by Anders Fogh Rasmussen in 2014 following his term as NATO Secretary General. The company provides strategic advice on issues regarding security policy, transatlantic relations, the European Union, energy, critical raw materials, and space.

Rasmussen Global is listed as one of the best ranked specialist consultancies in Brussels.

== History ==
Rasmussen Global was founded in 2014 by the former Danish Prime Minister and NATO Secretary General Anders Fogh Rasmussen.

On 27 May 2016, Rasmussen became a non-staff advisor to President Petro Poroshenko of Ukraine and the firm worked on reform in Ukraine and its global positioning. Rasmussen has also put together a group of friends of Ukraine to help with the reform effort.

In April 2022, Fabrice Pothier became the new CEO of Rasmussen Global.

In June 2022, Anders Fogh Rasmussen was asked by Ukrainian President Volodymyr Zelenskyy to co-chair an international working group on security guarantees for Ukraine together with Andriy Yermak, the head of the Office of the President of Ukraine. The resulting Kyiv Security Compact became the foundation of a G7 joint declaration on security guarantees co-signed by NATO allies at the 2023 NATO Summit in Vilnius. At the 2024 NATO Summit in Washington, the individual agreements negotiated between Ukraine and NATO allies were formalized in the Ukraine Compact.

In 2025, the firm was designated as an undesirable organization in Russia.

== Current activities ==
Rasmussen Global advises both sovereign clients and business clients. They include the government of Japan, Taiwan, Armenia, and in 2019-2020 Albania. The company also advises various multinational firms working in energy, critical raw materials, finance, information technology, and space. Since June 2022, Rasmussen Global is also working on a pro-bono basis with the Office of the President of Ukraine.

== Organization ==
The company is headquartered in Copenhagen, Denmark and has offices in Brussels, Berlin, and Kyiv.

It is led by CEO Fabrice Pothier. Its Geopolitical Practice is led by Senior Director for Geopolitics Harry Nedelcu. Rasmussen Global includes a number of senior advisors with political background - Vice President and former Irish digital and Europe Minister Dara Murphy, former Ukrainian MP Olena Sotnyk, former Chief of Staff at the German Ministry of Defence Nico Lange, former Executive Secretary-General of the European External Action Service Pierre Vimont.
