= From Social State to Minimal State =

- Author: Anders Fogh Rasmussen
- Original title: Fra socialstat til minimalstat
- Language: Danish
- Subject: Political economy
- Publisher: Samleren
- Publication date: 1993
- Publication place: Denmark
- Pages: 235
- ISBN: 87-568-1204-3
- LC Class: JN7161.F64 1993

From Social State to Minimal State (Danish: Fra socialstat til minimalstat) is a book by Anders Fogh Rasmussen. Published in 1993, it expounded the future Danish prime minister's classical liberal worldview. He argues that Denmark should transition from a welfare state into a low-tax economy and delivers advice and reflections on how it should be done.

Rasmussen was a backbencher, and his book formed a part of his strident criticism of the post-war welfare state. Rasmussen claims that the welfare state was "developing a slave mentality in the people". He argues that economic inequality is the prime motivating force in society and maintains that its existence in itself is not a bad thing but that only poverty is.

Rasmussen repeatedly makes the point that Danish people pay the highest taxes in the world, which he would press again in the 2001 general election that saw him become prime minister. However, he has otherwise repudiated many of the views expressed in the book by moving towards the orthodox centre-right and supporting environmentalism.

== See also ==
- Night-watchman state

=== Books ===
- The Sleeping People (1993) – Future Swedish prime minister Fredrik Reinfeldt argues against the Swedish welfare state

== Sources ==
- East, Roger; Thomas, Richard J. (2003). Profiles of People in Power: The World's Government Leaders. London: Routledge. ISBN 978-1-85743-126-1.
