= Fabrice Pothier =

French political expert

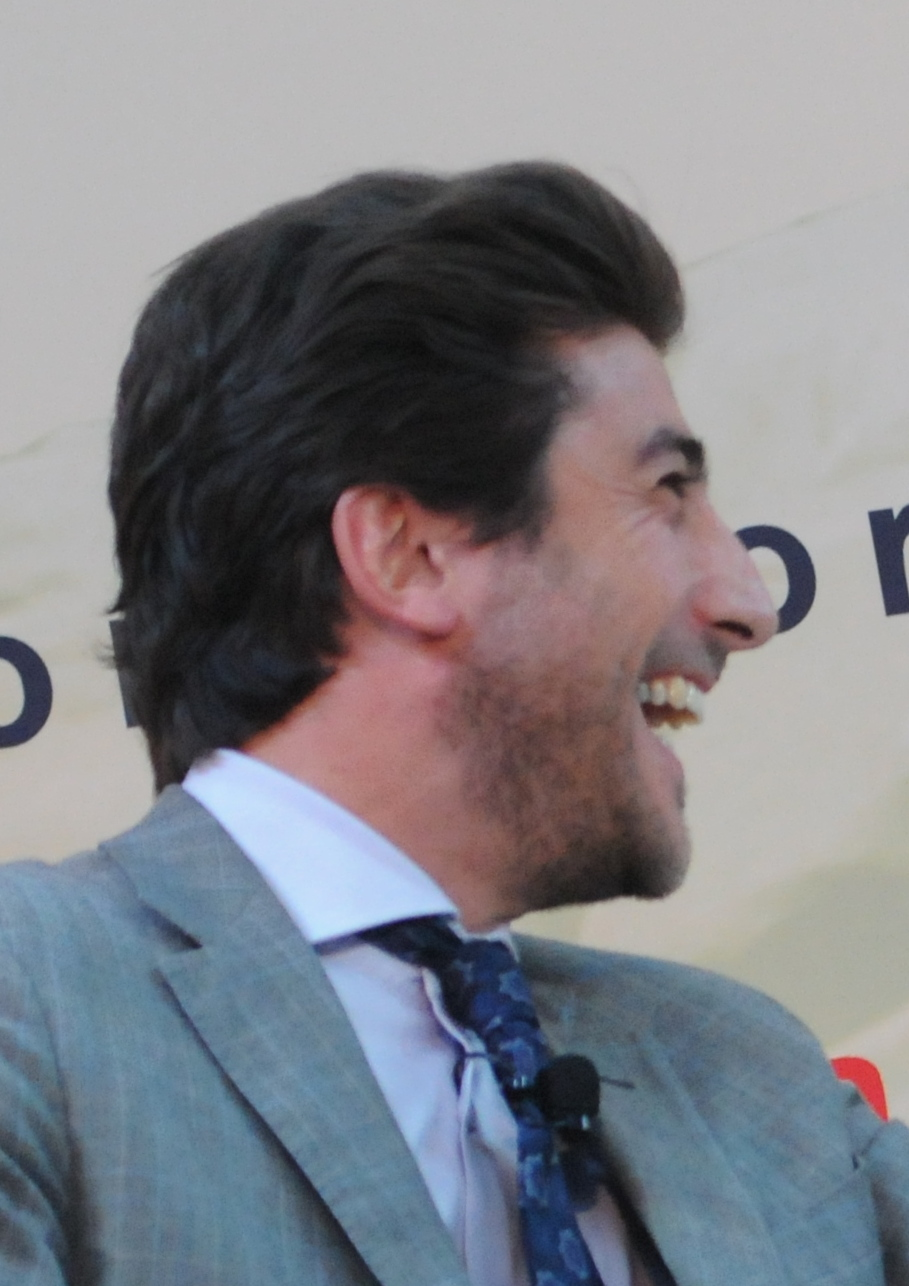
Fabrice Pothier at the Halifax Forum (2012)

Fabrice Pothier (born 24 August 1975) is a French political expert and CEO of geopolitical consultancy, Rasmussen Global. He is a regular media speaker, appearing in the Economist, CNN and BBC news. He was a former NATO director of policy planning and founding director of Carnegie Europe, an organisation which became one of Europe's leading think-tanks on foreign policy and strategic issues.

== European Engagement and En Marche ==
Pothier was a candidate at the European elections of 2019, for Emmanuel Macron's La République En Marche. He became known in the summer of 2018 for his unconventional way of promoting Europe, when he cycled 700 km through south-west France and northern Spain to engage with the French electorate and talk about the future of Europe.

According to Politico Europe, Pothier was a candidate to watch on the En Marche list for the 2019 European Parliament election, running on a ticket of increasing transparency for technology firms, bridging the gap between technology and security and toughening sanctions on malign states engaging on cyber aggression.

== Ukraine ==
Since Russia’s full-scale invasion of Ukraine, Pothier, as chief executive of Rasmussen Global, has been involved in advising the Office of the President of Ukraine on long-term security guarantees and the Kyiv Security Compact, an initiative launched by Anders Fogh Rasmussen and Andriy Yermak at the request of President Volodymyr Zelenskyy. In this capacity he has written publicly on security guarantees for Ukraine and the Kyiv Security Compact and has joined Rasmussen Global delegations to Kyiv that met Zelenskyy to discuss these proposals.

== Afghanistan ==
In the early 2000s, Pothier co-founded the Senlis Council, (later renamed the International Council on Security and Development), a project founded by the Network of European Foundations and led a global advocacy campaign calling for a more progressive drugs policy. He established a partnership with the International Federation of the Red Cross and Red Crescent and worked in Afghanistan advocating against the 'war on drugs' and working with the Afghan Red Crescent in developing better health facilities for drug addicts. He is credited to having been the first to publish a report on the insurgency in the province of Helmand.

== NATO ==
Within NATO, Pothier is credited to have been behind some of the Alliance's most consequential initiatives launched at the 2014 NATO Summit including the Readiness Action Plan, the Defence Capacity Building Initiative, and Smart Defence at the Chicago Summit in May 2012. He advised the NATO Secretary General on a wide range of strategic issues and on his communication strategy, including by drafting landmark speeches and articles for the Munich Security Conference and Foreign Affairs.

== Rasmussen Global ==
Since 2015, Pothier has been a senior director at Rasmussen Global and CEO since 2022. He regularly features in the Financial Times, Wall Street Journal, Politico Europe, Survival, Washington Post and Euronews. He has been a contributor to BBC World, France24, Al-Jazeera, CNBC, Bloomberg, and has testified before the UK Parliament's Foreign Affairs Committee. He writes on strategic affairs for the London-based International Institute of Strategic Studies.

== Foreign Interference and the Transatlantic Commission on Election Integrity ==
Pothier co-founded the Transatlantic Commission on Election Integrity co-chaired by Anders Fogh Rasmussen and Michael Chertoff. The commission includes Joe Biden, (formerly) Nick Clegg, and Marietje Schaake. In the Commission, Pothier raised awareness about the risks of foreign interference and was one of the first to point out the dangers of deepfakes. He has been an avid advocate that just as technology can be a source of evil, it can also be used as a force for good – to develop and deploy technology tools to better monitor and prevent disinformation campaigns from foreign countries. He played a key role exposing interference in the 2018 Mexico elections, the Macedonia name referendum and the Ukraine elections.
