= Alenius =

Alenius is a surname. Notable people with the surname include:

- Ele Alenius (1925–2022), Finnish politician
- Inga Ålenius (1938–2017), Swedish actress
- Roberta Alenius (born 1978), Swedish jurist and politician

== See also ==
- Alexius
