= The Sleeping People =

1993 book by Fredrik Reinfeldt

- Author: Fredrik Reinfeldt
- Original title: Det sovande folket
- Cover artist: Jesper Hörberg
- Language: Swedish
- Subject: Politics
- Published: 1993
- Publisher: Moderate Youth League
- Publication place: Sweden
- Pages: 124
- ISBN: 91-86194-10-0

The Sleeping People (Swedish: Det sovande folket, [deː ˈsôːvandɛ ˈfɔ̌lːkɛt]) is a 1993 book by Fredrik Reinfeldt, later Prime Minister of Sweden, which argues for abandoning the welfare state in Sweden and reducing the state's influence in society. Reinfeldt wrote the book when he was 28 years old, an elected Member of Parliament for the Moderate Party and chairman of its youth wing, the Moderate Youth League. The book was edited by Per Schlingmann and Christer Söderberg (later ombudsman for M), and published by the Moderate Youth League.

Written when the early 1990s banking crisis was deepest, the book argues for abandoning the general welfare state in Sweden, for sharp tax cuts, and for the rollback of the state's involvement in education, law, culture, and the media.

== Background ==
The Swedish Social Democratic Party (S) was, after World War II, a dominant force in Swedish politics. S led the government from 1948, until 1976 when the Moderates (M) formed a government with the Liberals (L) and the Centre Party (C). M was then part of the government until 1982 when S once again formed a government. In the 1991 general election, M – under the leadership of Carl Bildt – once again formed a government and Reinfeldt was elected to the Riksdag, representing Stockholm county.

Sweden was at the time facing a banking crisis.

Reinfeldt had been active in the Moderate Youth League since 1983, and represented a conservative faction in the organization. In 1992 he became the chairman of the organization, beating the incumbent Ulf Kristersson – who represented a more liberal faction – in what has been called the Battle of Lycksele.

== Content ==
The book is a compilation of five chapters. The first chapter ("The Sleepy brains") describes a dystopian world where there exists two types of people: "fools", who work for the government, and "the sleepy brains", who live on government welfare. The story is told from the perspective of a "fool" who finds out his son has died from an illness called "the welfare death" (välfärdsdöden). The son was 28 years old and a "sleepy brain", who had no motivation or purpose in life and just watched TV all day, with a remote glued to his hand.

The Swedes are mentally handicapped and indoctrinated to believe that politicians can create and guarantee welfare.

— Chapter Two, The Sleeping People

The second chapter ("How is the civil society woken up?") describes how the Moderates should convince people of their ideology. Reinfeldt accuses the Social Democrats of suppressing civil society and brainwashing people to support them. The chapter also disparages the Left Party, the Liberal People's Party and parts of the Centre Party. The chapter advocates for a reduction in government influence.

Chapter three ("Diary in an awake human's life") is a fictional diary entry by Johanna – a young Swedish woman – describing a day in her life. She is motivated, plans for the future, talks to older generations, supports Djurgården IF (Note: Fredrik Reinfeldt is a longtime supporter of Djurgården IF.) and thinks about international events.

We don't want to see a society where people starve, but other than that no standard rights should be financed by taxes.

— Chapter Four, The Sleeping People

In Chapter four ("Responsibility, morality and own norms"), Reinfeldt reflects on the Ten Commandments and their relevancy in the modern world. The chapter ends with a call to action for Moderate Party politicians, to be more daring in their actions.

Chapter five ("Of course it's possible to affect") is a non-fiction story, about how Reinfeldt fund-raised money for a famine in Ethiopia in 1985. At the time, Reinfeldt was part of a committee representing conscripted soldiers in Sweden (Värnpliktsrådet). The story describes how he helped organize a country wide campaign to convince conscripts to voluntarily donate their money, and raise c. SEK 250,000 (equivalent to SEK 656,500 in 2023).

== Reception ==
After Reinfeldt became the leader of the Moderate Party in 2003, and Prime Minister in 2006, the book was often referred to by his political opponents. At the 2009 Social Democratic Party congress, the party leader Mona Sahlin recommended reading the book, not for inspiration, but to understand the ideology of the Reinfeldt cabinet.

Reinfeldt has tried to distance himself from the book, calling it a "sin of youth" (ungdomssynd). When asked in May 2014 if he had written any books, he said: "I have not written any literature or non-fiction books, but have been a co-author to texts that the Moderates have published." Folkbladet published an article criticizing Reinfeldt for having denied authorship of the book, and Alliansfritt Sverige – an anti-Alliance organisation – accused Reinfeldt of falsifying history by hiding his authorship.

=== Theater adaption ===
In 2013, when Reinfeldt was still Prime Minister, a theater group adapted The Sleeping People to the stage, which renewed discussion of the book. The play was a direct adaption of the book, with the addition of two homeless people talking about their experiences.

== See also ==
- Fredrik Reinfeldt § Works
- Night-watchman state

=== Books ===
- The New Totalitarians (1971) – British author Roland Huntford characterizes Sweden as a benevolent totalitarian state
- From Social State to Minimal State (1993) – Future Danish prime minister Anders Fogh Rasmussen argues against the Danish welfare state
