= Ginnerup =

Village in Central Jutland Region, Denmark

Coordinates: 56°24′36.32″N 10°44′55.96″E

Ginnerup (Danish pronunciation: [ˈke̝nˀəʁɔp]), is a small settlement and parish on the Djursland Peninsula in Denmark, located in north eastern Jutland. Ginnerup is around 10 km west of Grenå. It is a part of Norddjurs Municipality in Region Midtjylland.

== Landmarks and monuments ==
Ginnerup Kirke is a traditional chalkstone church in the village, built in the 12th century. Neolithic long barrow rock monuments, the Ginnerup Jyndovnen, are also found in the area.

== Notable people ==
Anders Fogh Rasmussen (born 1953 in Ginnerup) is a Danish politician who served as 24th Prime Minister of Denmark 2001 to 2009, and was the 12th Secretary General of NATO 2009 to October 2014.
