= Arbetslinjen =

Principle of employment-oriented welfare policy in Sweden and Norway

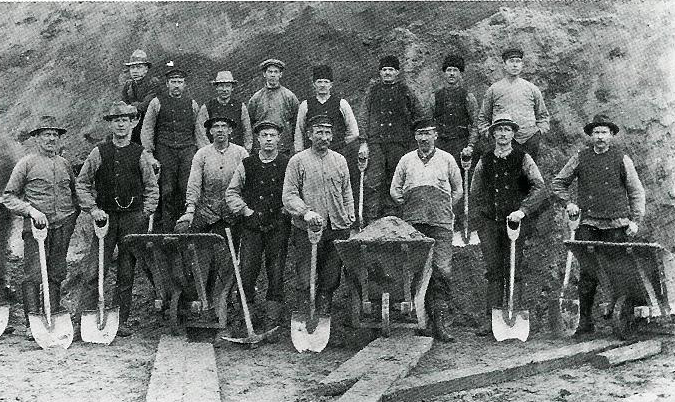
Relief work on Ådalsvägen in Huskvarna, Sweden, in the early 1920s.

Arbetslinjen (Swedish, literally "the work line"), known in Norwegian as arbeidslinja, is a principle in labour market policy and social policy that prioritises employment and measures to help people enter work over financial assistance alone. It combines public support for employment with requirements for people capable of working to seek employment or participate in employment-related activities.

The principle has been supported by both social democratic and centre-right political actors. Its interpretation has varied, with differing emphasis on the right to work, public employment measures, individual obligations and financial incentives.

== Sweden ==
=== Historical development ===
The Swedish principle developed through unemployment relief during the First World War. The State Unemployment Commission, established in 1914, continued operating after the war. Relief work provided income but also tested recipients' willingness to work. During the 1920s, relief wages were below those in the regular labour market, contributing to political conflict. A government inquiry in 1925 examined proposals to combat unemployment through public works.

The Social Welfare Committee, which worked between 1938 and 1951, considered the relationship between employment, social insurance and means-tested assistance. Its proposals sought to combine economic protection with incentives for self-support. During the post-war expansion of active labour market policy, particularly in the 1960s and 1970s, greater emphasis was placed on removing barriers to employment. Debate also concerned job quality and individual choice.

During the 1990s, the principle became more prominent in sickness insurance, with increased emphasis on prevention, rehabilitation and returning to work. A 1995 government inquiry argued that insurance should provide financial security while helping restore the insured person's capacity for work. Government Bill 1996/97:28 proposed that work capacity should ultimately be assessed against jobs normally available in the labour market, while restricting consideration of circumstances other than medical factors.

=== Twenty-first century ===
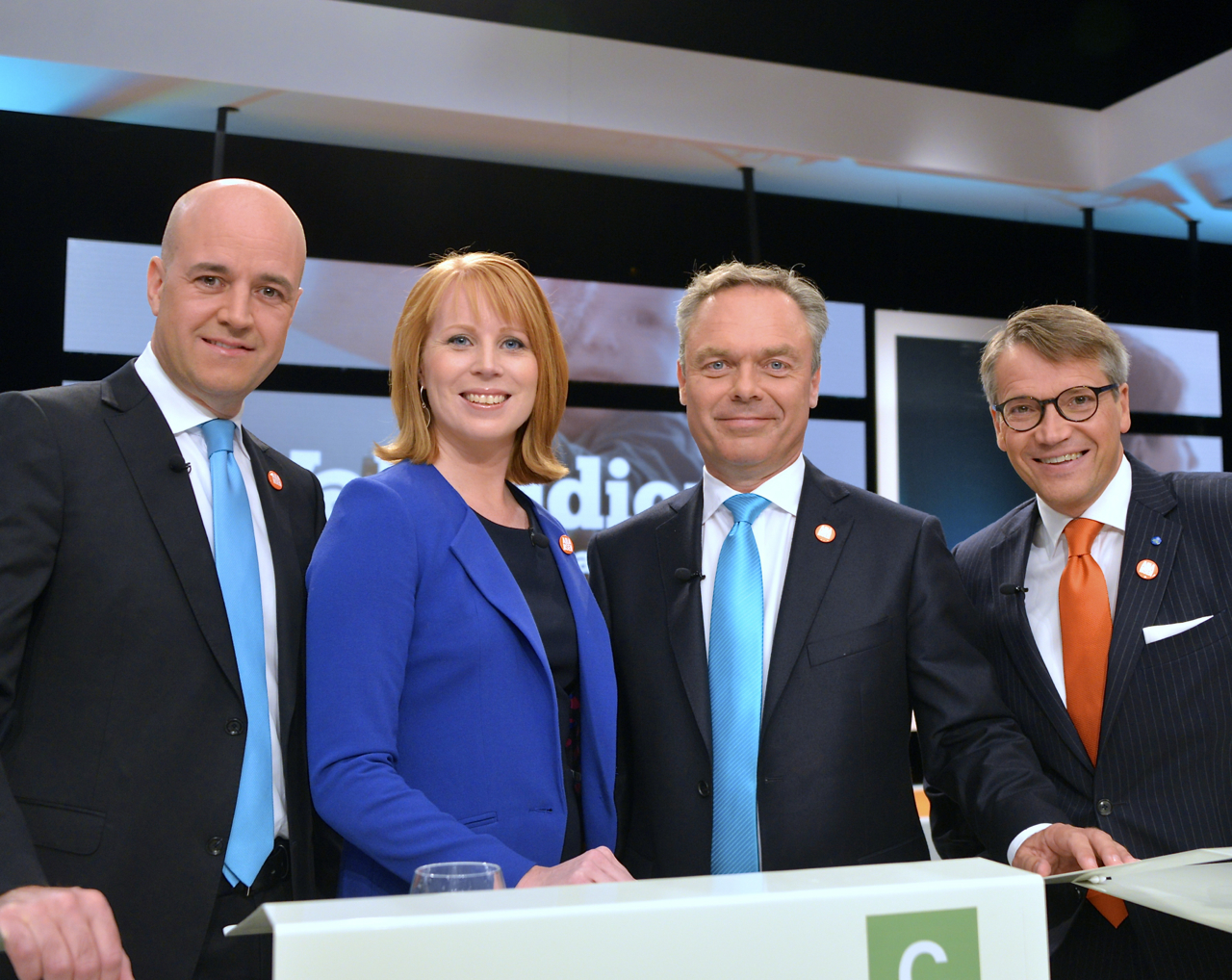
The leaders of Sweden's Alliance parties before the televised election debate in September 2014.

The Alliance made arbetslinjen a central theme before the 2006 Swedish general election. Under Fredrik Reinfeldt, the government introduced successive income tax reductions intended to increase the financial rewards of employment. In a retrospective analysis, SVT political commentator Elisabeth Marmorstein described this as a central argument behind the Moderate Party's approach in 2006.

The government's interpretation was contested. The Swedish Trade Union Confederation (LO) argued that lower benefits and stricter eligibility conditions departed from an approach combining adequate income protection with employment assistance, activity requirements and sanctions. In 2012, Left Party leader Jonas Sjöstedt criticised the government's employment policy, arguing that its promises had failed unemployed people and those on sick leave.

During the 2018 election campaign, the Moderate Party linked the principle to the labour market integration of foreign-born residents. Ulf Kristersson advocated lower taxes, more apprenticeships and a cap on benefits. Magdalena Andersson opposed legislation to reduce entry-level wages and supported an employment scheme negotiated by employers and trade unions.

The 2019 January Agreement proposed an income-based unemployment insurance system covering more workers, with payments declining as unemployment continued. Its reference to flexicurity prompted debate about the balance between labour market flexibility and economic security.

In September 2025, the Kristersson cabinet and the Sweden Democrats presented a benefit reform including a benefit cap, qualification requirements for certain social insurance benefits and activity requirements for recipients of social assistance capable of working. The government described the proposals as strengthening arbetslinjen by increasing the financial rewards of moving into employment.

Before the 2026 Swedish general election, the Social Democrats presented a "new work line", including education and training, support and requirements for jobseekers, and stronger employment services and unemployment insurance.

=== Debate and criticism ===
Employment activation programmes have attracted criticism concerning their content and administration. In 2011, SVT investigated Fas 3 ("Phase 3"), a programme for long-term unemployed people, reporting concerns about payments to providers and the activities offered to participants.

In a 2025 examination of government employment policy, economist Anders Forslund questioned whether reduced benefits and increased job-search requirements helped people facing substantial barriers to employment. Forslund and Lars Calmfors instead emphasised vocational training and subsidised employment as measures to assist the long-term unemployed.

== Norway ==
=== Development and implementation ===
In Norway, arbeidslinja became a central organising principle of welfare policy during the 1990s. Its development was reflected in the 1992 national employment strategy, the rehabilitation white paper Attføringsmeldingen (Report No. 39, 1991–1992) and the welfare white paper Velferdsmeldingen (Report No. 35, 1994–1995). These linked employment policy, vocational rehabilitation and social security provision.

The principle combined the goal of employment for those able to work with assistance for those needing income protection. A 2004 government inquiry described broad political agreement on prioritising employment over benefit receipt, linking participation both to individual welfare and to financing the welfare state. Researcher Ivar Lødemel's 1997 report Pisken i arbeidslinja examined how municipalities implemented work requirements as a condition of social assistance, placing these within a wider policy combining incentives and sanctions.

Employment-oriented welfare administration was also a central objective of the NAV reform. The reform proposed in 2005 sought to coordinate employment services, national insurance and municipal social assistance. Its stated aims included increasing employment and activity, reducing benefit dependency and providing services better adapted to users' needs.

=== Political debate and criticism ===
Both the Labour Party and the Conservative Party have supported arbeidslinja, while disagreeing over its implementation. In 2013, Conservative politician Torbjørn Røe Isaksen argued for stronger activity requirements for young social assistance recipients and lower taxes on low incomes. Labour minister Anniken Huitfeldt rejected the suggestion that her government had weakened the principle, emphasising employment-supporting public expenditure and existing powers to impose activity requirements.

Researchers Steinar Stjernø and Einar Øverbye have criticised an excessive emphasis on work incentives. In 2013, they argued that concerns about declining work motivation were overstated, noting Norway's high employment participation. They described a tension between preventing poverty through benefits and designing those benefits to encourage employment, particularly where recipients were required to participate in activation programmes.

== See also ==
- Active labour market policies
- Folkhemmet
- Nordic model
- Welfare state
- Workfare
