= AFR (film) =

- Theatrical release poster
- Directed by: Morten Hartz Kaplers
- Written by: Morten Hartz Kaplers; Allan Milter Jakobsen
- Produced by: Meta Louise Foldager
- Starring: Morten Hartz Kaplers; Anders Fogh Rasmussen; Pia Kjærsgaard
- Cinematography: Lars Bonde; Magnus Nordenhof Jonck
- Edited by: Per Sandholt; Rasmus Madsen
- Distributed by: Liberty Film
- Release date: 20 April 2007
- Running time: 85 minutes
- Country: Denmark
- Language: Danish

AFR (abbreviation for Anders Fogh Rasmussen) is a Danish mockumentary released in 2007, directed by Danish filmmaker Morten Hartz Kaplers, who also appears in the film. AFR was produced by the Zentropa-producer Meta Louise Foldager.

== Content ==
The film uses archival footage, actors, and computer effects to portray an assassination of the Danish Prime Minister Anders Fogh Rasmussen, and even before the release received substantial criticism from those who believed the subject was exploitive and in bad taste, and is therefore very similar to the controversial British mockumentary Death of a President which portrays the fictional assassination of the 43rd President of the United States, George W. Bush.

The faux documentary broadcast surrounds the Danish Prime Minister Anders Fogh Rasmussen and his secret homosexual lover, Emil (Morten Hartz Kaplers) until the Prime Minister is assassinated.

Among the real archival footage there was a clip of Pia Kjærsgaard, who says, "[...]og så var han jo bøsse, det var kendt for enhver" ("and he was also gay; everybody knew that"). Pia Kjærsgaard has dissociated herself from the use of the clip which origins from a statement to the assassination of the homosexual Dutch politician Pim Fortuyn in 2002. Several other politicians and leaders appear in the film as well.

== Release and reception ==
The mockumentary was presented at the International Film Festival in Rotterdam in January 2007, where it won the Tiger Award, as well as 10,000 euro and the rights for it to be broadcast on national television.

AFR was released in Danish cinemas on 20 April 2007.

== See also ==
- Death of a President - Mockumentary about the assassination of U.S. President George W. Bush.
