= Fredrik Reinfeldt =

Prime Minister of Sweden from 2006 to 2014

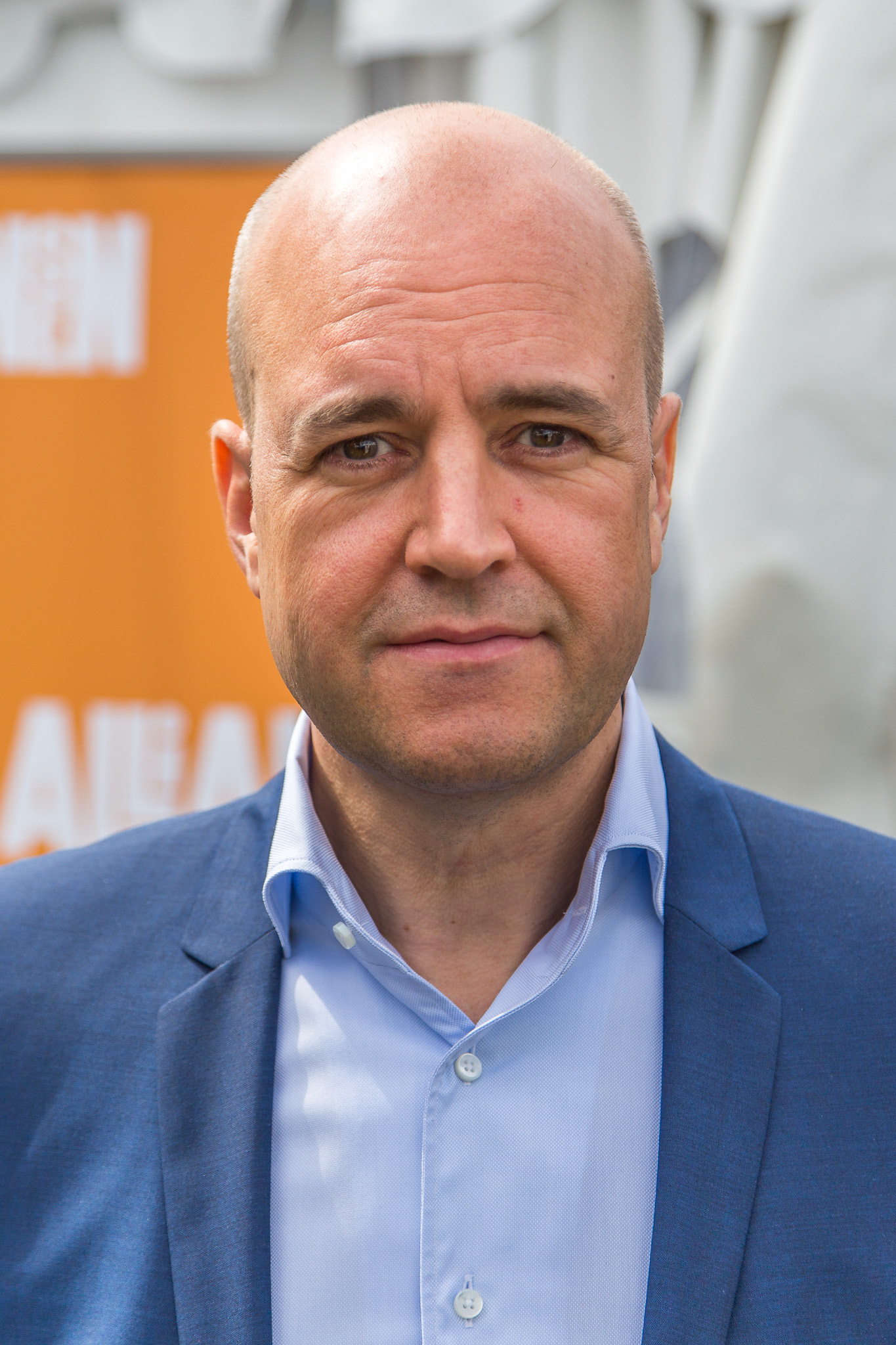
- Reinfeldt in 2014

Prime Minister of Sweden
- In office 6 October 2006 – 3 October 2014
- Monarch: Carl XVI Gustaf
- Deputy: Maud Olofsson; Jan Björklund
- Preceded by: Göran Persson
- Succeeded by: Stefan Löfven

Leader of the Opposition
- In office 3 October 2014 – 10 January 2015
- Monarch: Carl XVI Gustaf
- Prime Minister: Stefan Löfven
- Preceded by: Stefan Löfven
- Succeeded by: Anna Kinberg Batra
- In office 25 October 2003 – 6 October 2006
- Monarch: Carl XVI Gustaf
- Prime Minister: Göran Persson
- Preceded by: Bo Lundgren
- Succeeded by: Göran Persson

Leader of the Moderate Party
- In office 25 October 2003 – 10 January 2015
- Deputy: Gunilla Carlsson
- Preceded by: Bo Lundgren
- Succeeded by: Anna Kinberg Batra

Member of the Riksdag for Stockholm County
- In office 1991–2014

Personal details
- Born: John Fredrik Reinfeldt; 4 August 1965 (age 61) Haninge, Sweden
- Party: Moderate Party
- Spouse(s): Filippa Holmberg (m. 1992; div. 2013) Anna Nordin (m. 2025)
- Domestic partner(s): Roberta Alenius (2015–2022)
- Children: 4
- Education: Stockholm University
- Cabinet: Reinfeldt's cabinet

Military service
- Allegiance: Sweden
- Branch/service: Swedish Army
- Unit: Lapland Ranger Regiment

John Fredrik Reinfeldt (Swedish: [ˈfrěːdrɪk ˈrâjnːfɛlt]; born 4 August 1965) is a Swedish economist and former politician who served as Prime Minister of Sweden from 2006 to 2014 and as Leader of the Moderate Party from 2003 to 2015. He was the last rotating President of the European Council in 2009. He was also chairman of the Swedish Football Association from 2023 to 2025.

A native of Stockholm County, Reinfeldt joined the Moderate Youth League in 1983. By 1992 he rose to the rank of chairman, a position he held until 1995. He served as Member of Parliament from 1991 to 2014, representing his home constituency. Reinfeldt was elected party leader on 25 October 2003, succeeding Bo Lundgren. Under his leadership, the Moderate Party has transformed its policies and oriented itself closer to the political centre, branding itself "The New Moderates" (Swedish: Nya moderaterna). In 2010, under Reinfeldt's leadership, the Moderate Party got its highest share of the vote since the introduction of universal suffrage in 1921.

Following the 2006 general election, Reinfeldt was elected prime minister on 6 October. Along with the three other centre-right political parties in the Alliance for Sweden, Reinfeldt presided over a coalition government with the support of a narrow majority in parliament. At the age of 41, he was the third-youngest person to become Prime Minister of Sweden.

Reinfeldt's first term in office included the 2008 financial crisis and the Great Recession. His popularity fell until the economy of Sweden emerged as one of the strongest in the European Union; this brought a resurgence of support for him, resulting in his government's re-election in 2010. Reinfeldt's second government was reduced to a minority government, owing to the rise of Sweden Democrats; he remained in power as the first centre-right Prime Minister since the Swedish-Norwegian Union to be re-elected..

His premiership was characterised by "Arbetslinjen" (English: Working line), a focus on getting more people into the workforce, and by management of the 2008 financial crisis and the Great Recession, which resulted in one of the world's strongest public finances and top rankings in climate and health care. He is the longest-serving non-Social Democratic Prime Minister since Erik Gustaf Boström's first spell in office between 1891 and 1900. After his defeat in the 2014 election Reinfeldt announced that he would step down from leading the party, which he did on 10 January 2015.

== Early life and education ==
John Fredrik Reinfeldt was born in 1965 in Allmänna BB hospital in Stockholm, the eldest of three brothers to his parents Bruno (1938–2016) and Birgitta Reinfeldt. At the time of his birth his parents lived in an apartment in Österhaninge, in the south of Stockholm County, but a short time afterwards the family moved to London, where his father worked as a consultant for Shell. Upon returning to Sweden, the family first lived in an apartment in Handen before moving to a terraced house in Bromsten in northwestern Stockholm. The Reinfeldt family was living in Bromsten when Fredrik's younger brothers, Magnus and Henrik, were born in 1969 and 1973. In 1976, the family moved into a single-family home in Täby in northeastern Stockholm County. His mother Birgitta was a leadership and management consultant, and some of her professional skills might have inspired and impressed the young Fredrik.

At the age of 11, Reinfeldt became chairman of the student council (Swedish: elevrådet) in his school, and became a fan of the football club Djurgårdens IF, a passion he maintains to this day. He started playing basketball for the "Tensta Tigers" while living in Bromsten (which is located adjacent to Tensta), and continued to play for them after his family moved to Täby. At his secondary school, Åva gymnasium, he studied natural science for three years. He also enjoyed setting up and performing revues and cabarets. After school, Reinfeldt completed his military service as a ranger (Swedish: lapplandsjägare) at Lapland Ranger Regiment and finished first in his class as a cadet in Umeå. It was during this time that he became interested in politics, as a representative for his regiment in the congress of conscripts in the Swedish military (Swedish: värnpliktsriksdagen). He graduated from Stockholm University School of Business with a degree in Business and Economics (Swedish: civilekonomexamen) in 1990.

== Political career ==
Reinfeldt joined the Moderate Youth League—the youth wing of the Swedish Moderate Party—in 1983 at the age of 18. As a member of the Moderate Youth League in Täby, he challenged the leaders of the local league, who preferred to use the premises as a place to drink beer and wine rather than engage in discussions about politics. Reinfeldt, who is said to dislike hard liquor and to consume wine and beer in moderate amounts, started "Conservative Youth" (Swedish: Konservativ ungdom) and formed a bond with the mother party, eventually taking over the youth league in 1987. In 1988 he became a secretary (Swedish: borgarrådssekreterare) in the Stockholm Municipality Council.

He was active in student politics while studying at Stockholm University, eventually becoming chairman of the student party "Borgerliga Studenter – Opposition '68" between 1988 and 1989. He became chairman of the Moderate Youth League's Stockholm branch in 1990, and the following year was elected a member of the Riksdag (the Swedish Parliament). In the Swedish general election of 1991 the Moderate Party and its allies had considerable success, leading to the formation of a centre-right coalition government under Moderate Party leader and Prime Minister Carl Bildt. The 1991 government was the first centre-right government in Sweden since 1982.

=== Leader of the Moderate Youth League ===
From 1992 to 1995 Reinfeldt was the chairman of the Moderate Youth League. He ousted the former chairman Ulf Kristersson at the controversial congress known as the Battle of Lycksele, securing 58 of the delegates' votes while Kristersson received only 55. The congress was controversial because it was the culmination of a long ideological battle within the Moderate Youth League between the conservatives and the libertarians; Reinfeldt represented the conservatives and Kristersson the libertarians. Reinfeldt later stated that although the effects of that deep ideological division and battle in the party lingered on within the Moderate Youth League, he also felt that it was a defining moment in his life. Had he lost the battle he would most likely not be in politics today. In 1993 Reinfeldt wrote the book The Sleeping People (Swedish: Det sovande folket), where he criticized the Swedish welfare state and argues for a liberal societal system. With phrases such as: "We don't want to see a society where people starve, but other than that no standard rights should be financed by taxes." (Note: In Swedish: "Vi vill inte se ett samhälle där människor svälter, men i övrigt skall inga standardkrav skattefinansieras") The book later haunted Reinfeldt, when he faced criticism for phrases such as "The Swedes are mentally handicapped and indoctrinated to believe that politicians can create and guarantee welfare." (Note: In Swedish: "Svenskarna är mentalt handikappade och indoktrinerade att tro att politiker kan skapa och garantera välfärd.")

From 1995 to 1997 he was chairman of the Democrat Youth Community of Europe.

Following the defeat of the Bildt government in the general election of 1994 he publicly criticized the Moderate Party leader Bildt, who he believed had become too dominant in the party.

In 1995 Reinfeldt co-authored the book Nostalgitrippen ('The Nostalgic Trip'), which described several persons in the Moderate Party leadership, including Gunnar Hökmark and Bo Lundgren, as "Carl Bildt-lookalikes." Bildt was described as being the perfect leader for the opposition to satirize; a nobleman living in the affluent Östermalm with a boyish expression and a better-than-you attitude. As for the other high party officials, the book stated that "If everyone appears similar to Carl it confirms peoples misconceptions about the Moderate Party. It becomes a party for Carl Bildt-copies."

This provoked swift reaction from the Moderate Party leadership, who believed that Reinfeldt's criticisms had gone too far. On 14 February 1995 Reinfeldt was called to a meeting of the Moderate Party's Riksdag group, which took place in the former second chamber (Swedish: andrakammarsalen) of the Swedish parliament building, a meeting where Bildt apparently scolded him for hours. After this, Reinfeldt toned down his criticism, but was ostracized within the Moderate Party and not given any important posts until after the change of leadership when Lundgren succeeded Bildt in 1999. At that time he was elected into a high party group, the förtroenderåd. From 2001 to 2002 Reinfeldt was chairman of the justice committee of the Riksdag. During this time he traveled around the country gathering impressions and support at the local level of the Moderate Party.

=== Leader of the Moderate Party ===
In the general election of 2002 the Moderate Party received 15.3 percent of the votes—its lowest share of the vote in a general election since 1973. Following the loss, Lundgren was forced to resign his position as leader of the Moderate Party. After the 2002 election Reinfeldt was elected as leader of the Moderate Party parliamentary group, spokesman for economic policy and vice chairman of the parliament's finance committee. On 25 October 2003 he was unanimously elected as the new leader of the Moderate Party.

==== "The New Moderates" ====
Under Reinfeldt's leadership, the Moderate Party adjusted its position in the political spectrum, moving towards the centre. To reflect these changes, the party's unofficial name was altered to "The New Moderates" (Swedish: De nya Moderaterna) to emphasize the break with the past. The Moderate Party started to focus more on calls for tax cuts for low- and middle-income groups, rather than on major tax cuts that would more benefit high-income earners.

As leader of the Moderate Party, Reinfeldt tended to be less forceful in his criticism of the Swedish welfare state than his predecessors. He instead proposed reforms to Sweden's welfare state, which included cutting taxes for the lowest income earners and reducing unemployment benefits, to encourage the jobless to return to work. He toned down calls within the party for dismantling large portions of the Swedish welfare state, stating that change must come gradually from the bottom up and not be dictated from the top down. His goal was said to be to fine-tune the welfare state, by focusing on getting people off welfare benefits and into employment. He worked to shift the conservatives toward the middle ground by convincing voters that he would fix rather than dismantle the public welfare system.

Reinfeldt even extended an invitation to the Swedish Trade Union Confederation, traditional supporter of the Social Democrats and opponent of the Moderate Party. He also changed the Moderate Party's traditional stance towards the Swedish Labour and employment laws, stating that he prefers small changes instead of any radical reform.

People both within and outside the party differ on their analysis of Reinfeldt's transformation of the Moderate Party, with some arguing that the party was mainly honing the way it describes its visions, and others suggesting that it constituted a substantial policy change towards the centre. As a consequence of Reinfeldt's shift of the Moderate Party to the centre, the differences between the Moderate Party and their traditional opponents the Social Democratic Party have become harder to discern. In a series of radio and television debates, the then-Social Democrat leader and Prime Minister Göran Persson portrayed his opponent as a classic conservative in disguise. Persson stated that, if put into power, the conservatives would tamper with Sweden's successful formula of high taxes, a large public sector and generous benefits. There was also some criticism within the party; former Moderate Youth League chairman Christofer Fjellner called Reinfeldt's political reform "leftist rhetoric" (Swedish: vänsterretorik).

==== Alliance for Sweden ====
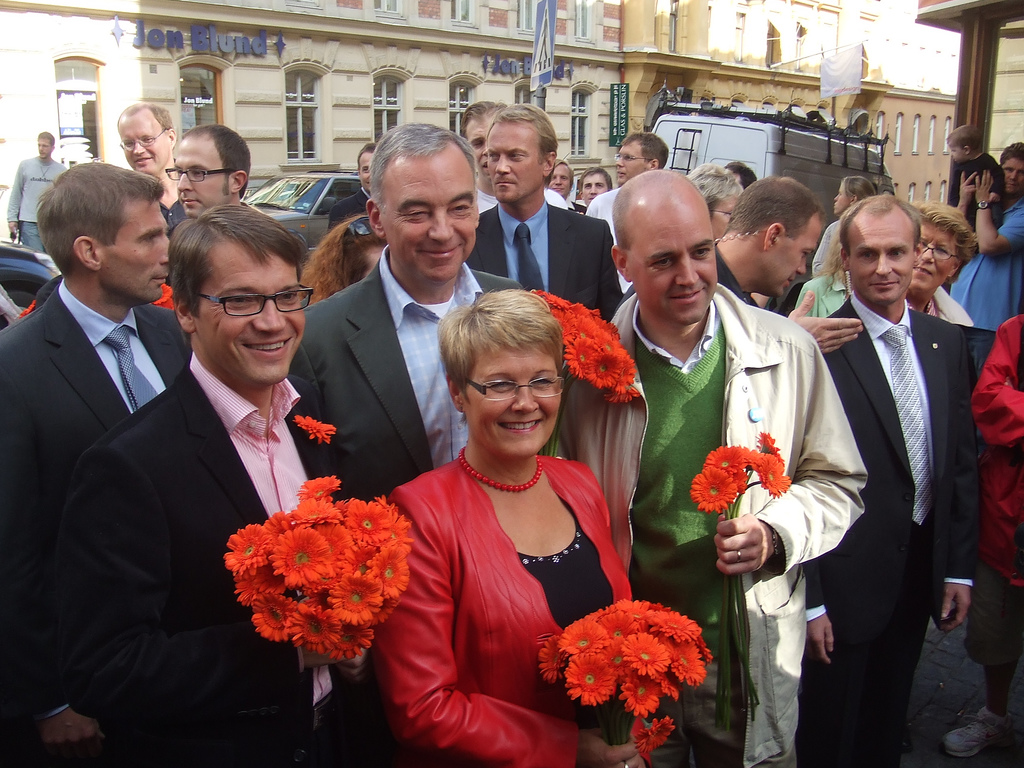
Fredrik Reinfeldt and the Alliance for Sweden in 2006. From left: Göran Hägglund, Lars Leijonborg, Maud Olofsson, Reinfeldt.

In the run-up to the general election of 2006, Reinfeldt, as leader of the Moderate Party, participated in the creation of the Alliance for Sweden. It united the centre-right in a coalition of the Moderate Party, the Centre Party, the Liberal People's Party and the Christian Democrats. Reinfeldt is said to have been instrumental in uniting the four parties, which previously were known for being notoriously divided, to present a powerful alternative to the Social Democrats. The parties presented a joint election manifesto for the alliance.

==== 2006 Swedish general election ====
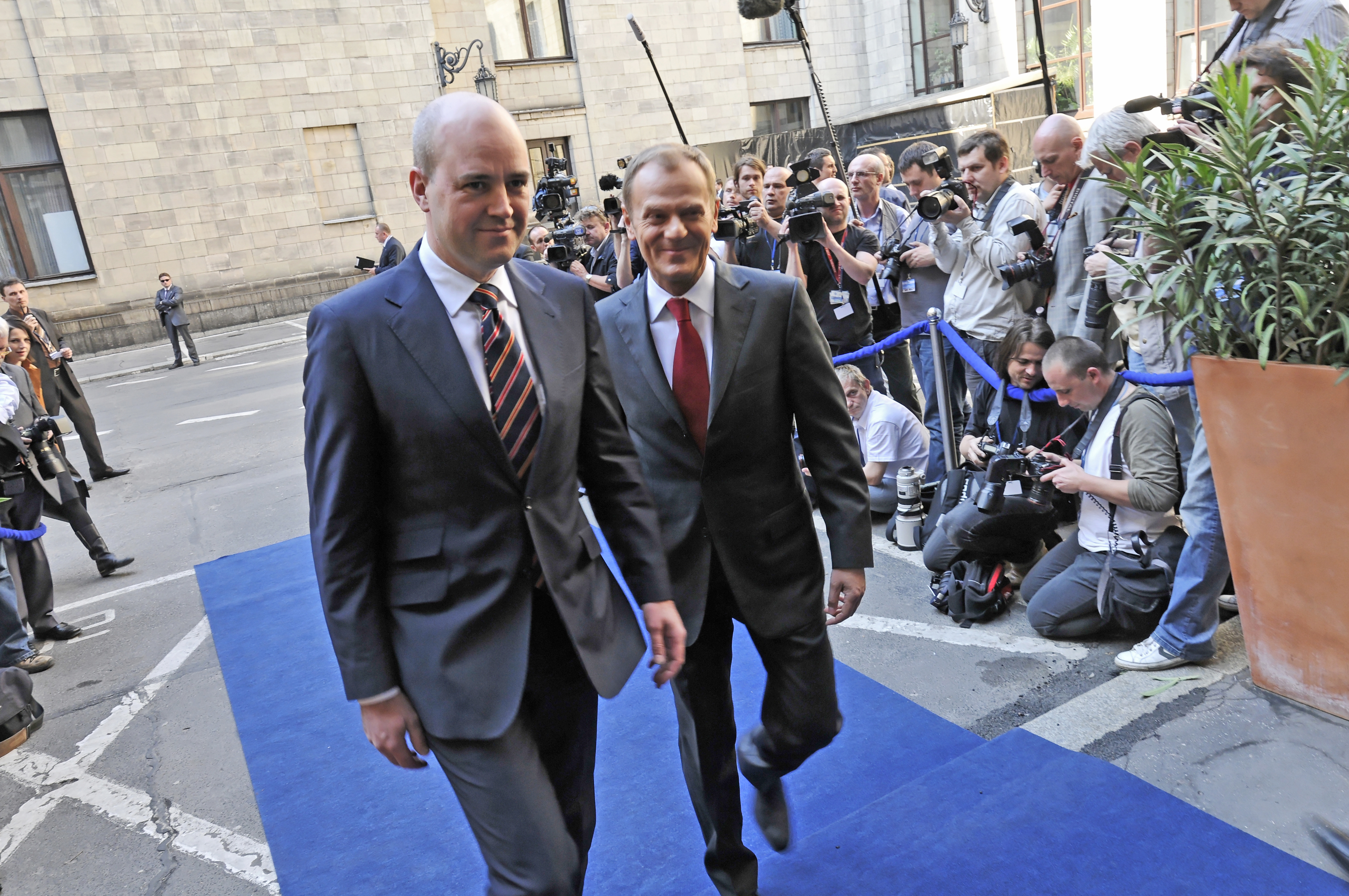
Fredrik Reinfeldt and the Prime Minister of Poland, Donald Tusk.

During the run-up to the 2006 general election, Reinfeldt was subjected to a smear campaign. Mats Lindström, a staff member in the Social Democratic Party headquarters, admitted to sending e-mails accusing Reinfeldt of tax fraud, false financial declarations and only attaining his position because of his father's influence. The IP address used in the e-mails was traced to the Social Democratic Party headquarters. Social Democratic Party Secretary Marita Ulvskog apologized and said that such behavior was completely unacceptable. A short time after the e-mail campaign, images that depicted Reinfeldt and the Moderate Party in an unflattering light were spread internally within the Social Democratic Party and subsequently leaked to the media. Social Democratic Party spokeswoman Carina Persson confirmed that the material came from the Social Democratic Youth League, but denied the existence of an official smear campaign and stated that the material was not meant to be released or spread to a wider audience.

At the general election on 17 September 2006 the Alliance for Sweden won a majority of the votes after the first count, defeating the Social Democratic Party. The Moderates received 26.1 percent of the votes, a new record for the party and over 10 percentage points higher than in 2002. The election result was also historic in being the worst result for the Social Democrats ever (34.6 percent) in a general election under universal suffrage (introduced in 1921).

Looking back at the defeat of the incumbent Social Democrats, the opinion among several members of the defeated incumbents was that the election was lost because the previous government failed to bring down unemployment, and failed to campaign on it as an issue. Ardalan Shekarabi, the former chairman for the Swedish Social Democratic Youth League, stated that "the Moderates were right strategically to focus on unemployment". Former Social Democratic minister Leif Pagrotsky stated that internal fighting, authoritarianism and perceived aggressiveness as well as a loss of appeal to the middle class and city inhabitants contributed to the election loss.

==== 2010 Swedish general election ====
In the 2010 general election held on 19 September 2010 the Alliance for Sweden were reduced to a minority government, but also becoming the first centre-right government to be re-elected since before World War II. The Moderate Party received 30.06 percent of the votes, which was the highest election result in over one hundred years.

The Alliance for Sweden received a plurality of votes, but not full majority in Parliament. But because of the fragmented opposition, after the entrance of the Sweden Democrats in parliament, the government could continue.

== Prime Minister (2006–2014) ==
Reinfeldt became the Prime Minister of Sweden on 6 October 2006 when he was confirmed by king Carl XVI Gustaf having been approved by the Riksdag the previous day, serving concurrently as Leader of the Moderate Party. The 41-year-old Reinfeldt became the youngest person to become prime minister since Rickard Sandler became Prime Minister at the age of 40 in 1925. With victories in 2006 and in 2010, Reinfeldt was the Moderate Party's longest-serving prime minister and the only person to lead the party to two consecutive general election victories. His Government compromised four parties (including his own) which prior to the election had formed a coalition named Alliance for Sweden, later turned into the Alliance.

At a press conference prior to his appointment, Reinfeldt commented that "this feels historic in many ways" partly because it was the first time in 36 years there would be a majority government in Sweden.

=== First term (2006–2010) ===
==== 2008 financial crisis and the Great Recession ====
The 2008 financial crisis and the Great Recession had a major impact on the Economy of Sweden. Reinfeldt's Government emphasized that a balanced budget was a priority, combined with income tax cuts to stimulate domestic production and commerce. The Cabinet received criticism for holding to hard in the public finances, with limited investments, and the support of Reinfeldt's policies dropped to one of the lowest ever seen for an incumbent Government.

From 2009, the Swedish economy emerged as one of the world's fastest recovering economies with high competitiveness. Sweden was noted for having proved to overcome the crisis better than any other developed countries, and this was highlighted by the Government as a force in the run-up to the 2010 Swedish general election. As Sweden emerged as the best country on several areas after the Great Recession, it brought a resurgence of support, which eventually resulted in his re-election in 2010. This was the first time ever that the Moderate Party was re-elected after completing a full first term.

==== President of the European Council ====
Reinfeldt became President of the European Council on 1 July 2009, as Sweden took over the Presidency of the Council of the European Union from the Czech Republic. His slogan was "taking on the challenge". Reinfeldt immediately requested the European Union to do more to combat climate change. Days earlier, he had been interviewed by Reuters and said he spoke of his worry about increased European public debt. He spoke of his wish for Turkey to join the European Union. He also spoke of his other views, such as his hope that a second term would be possible quickly for the President of the European Commission and his desire that the European Union should not sanction Iran immediately following its election protests.

=== Second term (2010–2014) ===
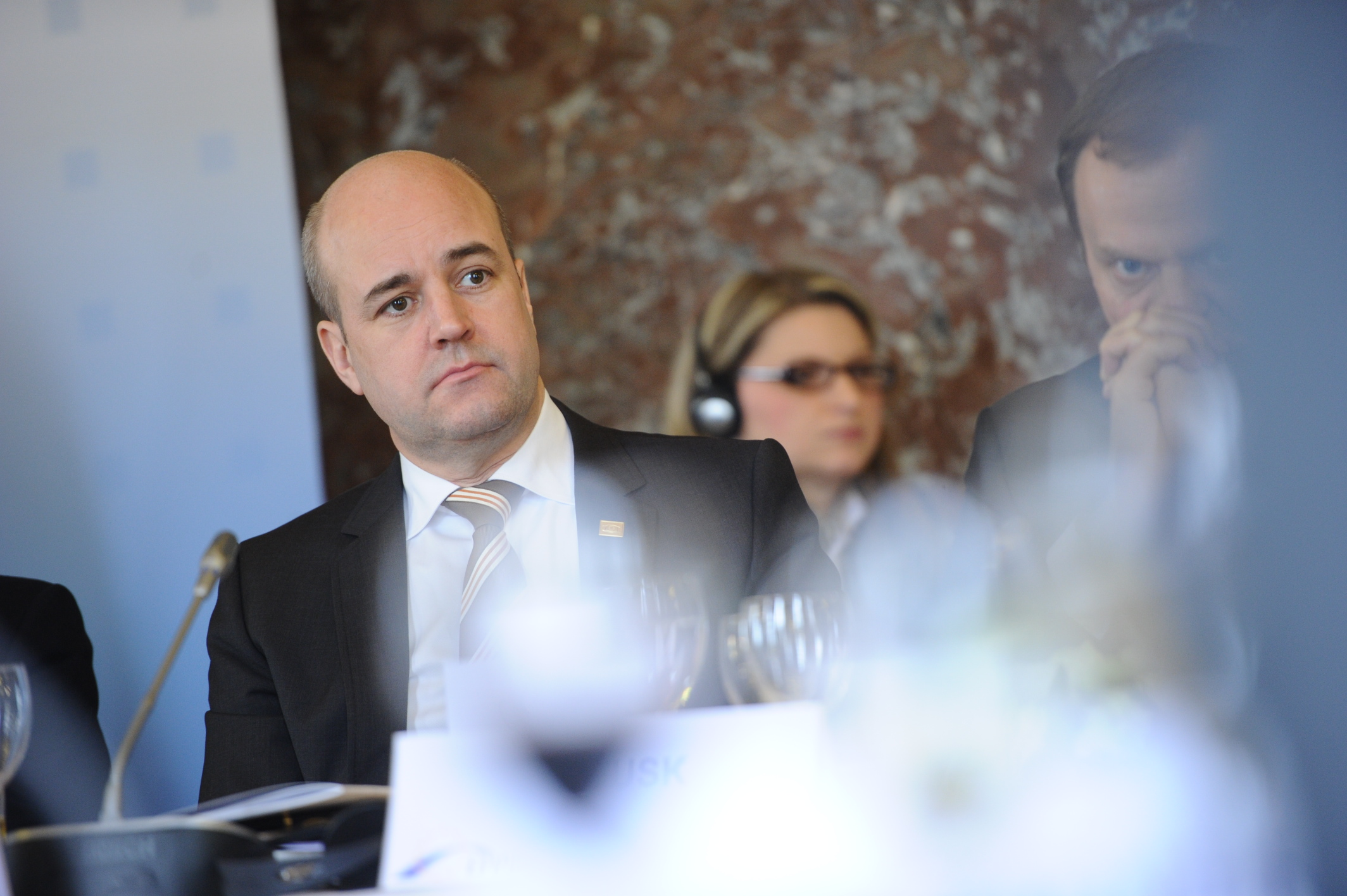
Reinfeldt at the EPP Congress in March 2012

In the 2010 general election, the Moderate Party increased its share of the vote to 30.06 percent. The Alliance got a plurality of votes cast, but with 173 seats no absolute majority in parliament. With the opposition divided mainly by the Sweden Democrats, Reinfeldt could remain in government, but with a greater need to seek consensus on matters of substance with the opposition parties.

The second term compromised a slow recovery from the Great Recession and consolidation of policies from the first term. The political debate came from 2013 to be highly dominated by issues where the Government came in a defense mode, in particular for the poor performance of Swedish pupils in the international study of school performance, the Programme for International Student Assessment, and profits gained in private welfare, especially after the economic collapse that had preceded the closure of school group JB Education AB and questions of how key people in the Government, including himself, acted in the N.V. Nuon Energy affair.

Reinfeldt had during his second term, in contrast to his first term, no major international engagement. Contacts with other politicians, however, remained good, which was also marked by Barack Obama's visit to Stockholm in September 2013.

=== Immigration policy ===
After the nationalist Sweden Democrats entered the Riksdag, Reinfeldt wanted to seek bipartisan consensus on immigration policy in an attempt to undercut and isolate the Sweden Democrats on their main issue. In early 2011 an agreement between the Alliance and the Green Party was reached, which would among other things, give undocumented immigrants access to universal healthcare and lessen the requirements for family reunification. During the last year of Reinfeldt's time in office Sweden faced the biggest influx of immigrants it had ever seen up until that point. During a press conference in the run-up to the 2014 election campaign Reinfeldt urged the Swedish people to "open their hearts" (Swedish: öppna era hjärtan) to people fleeing wars, stating that he wouldn't promise much in the upcoming campaign considering the costs that the immigration would bring. The Sweden Democrats perceived the press conference as confirming their belief that asylum immigration is in conflict with the Swedish welfare state.

=== Economic policy ===
He adopted a liberal roadmap, leading in particular to a modification of the tax system (including the abandonment of inheritance tax), a tightening of the conditions of access to unemployment benefits or sick pay, and the reduction of public spending.

It privatised much of the health sector from 2006, with mixed results. While the number of specialists has increased, reducing waiting times for appointments, privatisation has also led to higher costs for the government (to make a profit, private institutions have to increase the number of consultations and interventions) and increased inequalities in access to health care, with specialists tending to leave the regions for the big cities and the suburbs for wealthier areas.

In early 2013, the liberal British magazine The Economist praised the Reinfeldt government's reforms, pointing out that the country could become "the next liberal supermodel".

=== Foreign policy ===
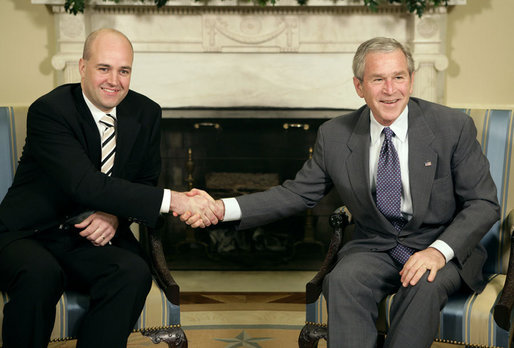
Reinfeldt with U.S. President George W. Bush at the White House.

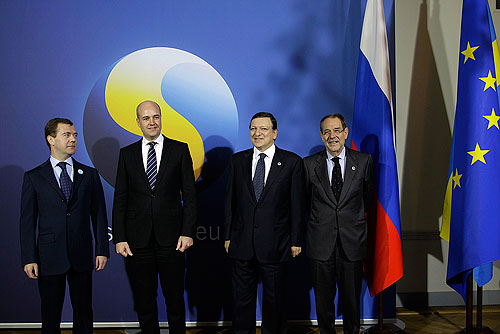
Reinfeldt meets with President of the European Commission José Manuel Barroso, President of Russia Dmitry Medvedev and EU High Representative for Common Foreign and Security Policy Javier Solana with in the EU–Russia Summit in Stockholm, 18 November 2009.

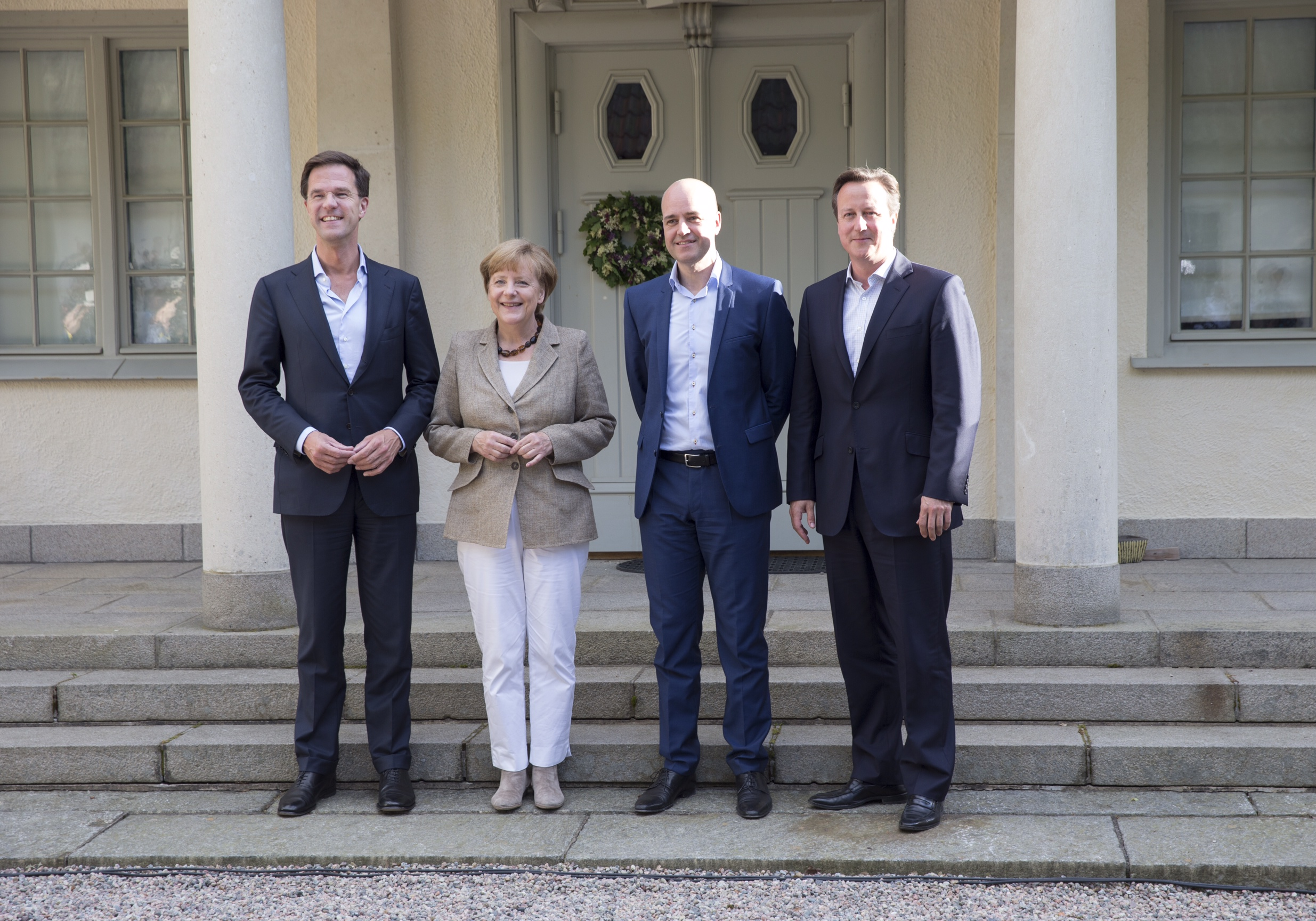
Reinfeldt meets with Dutch Prime Minister Mark Rutte, German Chancellor Angela Merkel and British Prime Minister David Cameron in Harpsund, 9 June 2014.

The Moderate Party has a pro-European Union policy stance—including support for exchanging the SEK for the Euro—and also supports Sweden joining NATO. During the 2000 United States presidential election, Reinfeldt visited the United States to support the campaign of George W. Bush. Prior to the 2004 United States presidential election, Reinfeldt again expressed his support for Bush. In an interview with the newspaper Stockholm City on 8 March 2004, Reinfeldt said that he preferred Bush over the Democratic Party contender John Kerry, and in a poll conducted by the newspaper Svenska Dagbladet in April 2004, Reinfeldt like a large majority of his party favoured Bush over Kerry.

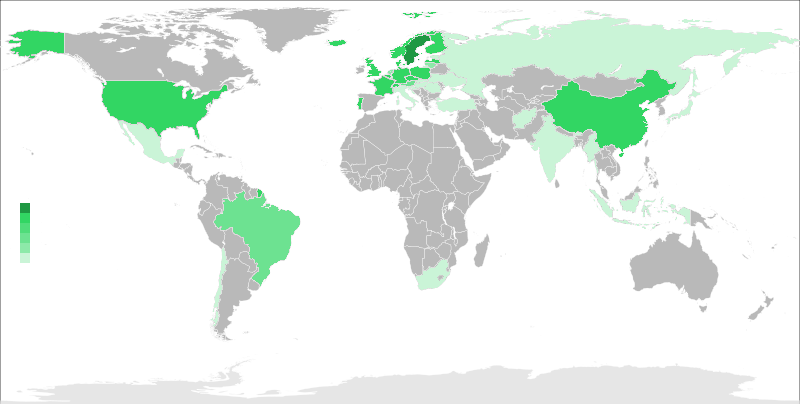
Foreign trips made by Fredrik Reinfeldt as Prime Minister

Despite this, he has compared his government's actions and policies to those of Bill Clinton's administration, and supported Barack Obama in the 2008 United States presidential election.

Reinfeldt visited Washington, D.C., on 15 May 2007, meeting with President Bush. His trip also included meetings with others, including United Nations Secretary-General Ban Ki-moon and California Governor Arnold Schwarzenegger. This is his first visit to the United States since becoming prime minister in 2006. Bush and Reinfeldt mostly discussed climate change and free trade, focusing on the Doha Round. He visited President Barack Obama at first the White House and then in the Metropolitan Museum of Art on 23 September 2009.

Reinfeldt was President of the European Council from 1 July to 1 December 2009. The signing of the Treaty of Lisbon was Reinfeldt's role as President of the Council, which also occurred on 13 December 2009. Reinfeldt was also responsible in this role to put EU's efforts to get into a binding agreement at the United Nations Climate Change Conference in Copenhagen in 2009 but this did not succeed.

== Post-premiership (2014–present) ==
After defeat in 2014, Reinfeldt announced he would step down as both Prime Minister of Sweden and as party leader of the Moderate Party. He stepped down from the office of prime minister on 3 October 2014, being succeeded by Stefan Löfven. He resigned from the Riksdag on 31 December 2014 and stepped down as party leader on 10 January 2015, being succeeded by Anna Kinberg Batra.

On 19 January 2015, Reinfeldt announced that he had formed his own business Fredrik Reinfeldt AB where he will serve as an advisor and lecturer. He will also continue to promote his "job line", which was a key part of his premiership, in a continued community deed. On 1 September 2015 he published his autobiography Halfway, a reflection on his 25 years in Swedish and international politics.

On 11 December 2015, Reinfeldt was nominated to become the next chairman of the Extractive Industries Transparency Initiative.

In January 2016, Reinfeldt was awarded H. M. The King's Medal, 12th size with chain, for extraordinary efforts as prime minister. On 15 March 2016 it was announced that Reinfeldt had been hired by Bank of America Merrill Lynch as a senior adviser for its business in Europe, the Middle East and Africa.

On 25 March 2023, he was elected chairman of the Swedish Football Association. In December 2024, he was accused of threatening SFA employees not to voice their scrutiny of Saudi Arabia's human rights, after the country was awarded the 2034 FIFA World Cup. Simon Åström replaced him as chairman on 22 March 2025.

== Public perception ==
Reinfeldt has been called a "Swedish David Cameron", insofar as he succeeded in shifting the public perception of the Moderate Party from a clear right-wing position to a more centrist one. On the other hand, he is thought to have influenced Cameron, since Reinfeldt was elected party leader in 2003—two years before Cameron took control of the British Conservative Party in 2005. Reinfeldt has also been described as a communitarian.

In a study by Sifo, a Swedish polling institute, Reinfeldt was the "most admired man in Sweden" in 2006. Reinfeldt's approval rating reached its highest measured point yet in December 2006, at 57% approval in an Aftonbladet/Sifo poll. Approval ratings for Reinfeldt as a person remained overall good but fluctuating through most of the period 2006–2010, but did not always seem to translate into support for the cabinet.

Reinfeldt has been perceived as a controlled and harmonious person. He was described, already before he became prime minister, as "gentle, pensive and a good listener" and his "cool, soft-spoken approach" is said to go down well with Swedish voters; it also fits well with the promotion of the policies of his cabinet as being not ideological, but motivated by non-political reason and common sense, in implicit contrast to the "ideological excesses" of the Social Democrats and their allies. Aware of this perception, Reinfeldt has said "I am by nature confident and calm. But that does not mean I am not passionate and wouldn't feel strongly about things." Regarding his family life, Reinfeldt has cultivated the image of a good family man who enjoys housework.

== Criticism ==
Reinfeldt has been criticized for supposedly anti-Swedish commentary such as "The native Swedish culture is only barbaric" (a paraphrase on a line from a poem by Esaias Tegnér from 1836) which referred to the positive effect the inflow of people and influences had on the development of Sweden. Reinfeldt received heavy criticism for having proposed in a deputy report, authored by himself, that Swedes should work to the age of 75 and further if possible. SVT published an article of Reinfeldt's commentary on Twitter speaking of low unemployment among "ethnic swedes" for which he received severe criticism. Leftist anarchist leaning website AktuelltFokus published an article criticizing Reinfeldt, after leaving politics, for receiving a government pension with monthly payments of 156 000 SEK from Swedish tax money while his own corporate declared a profit of 22 million SEK in 2016. Jimmie Åkesson, party leader of the nationalist Sweden Democrats, has often called Reinfeldt "swede-phobic".

== Personal life ==
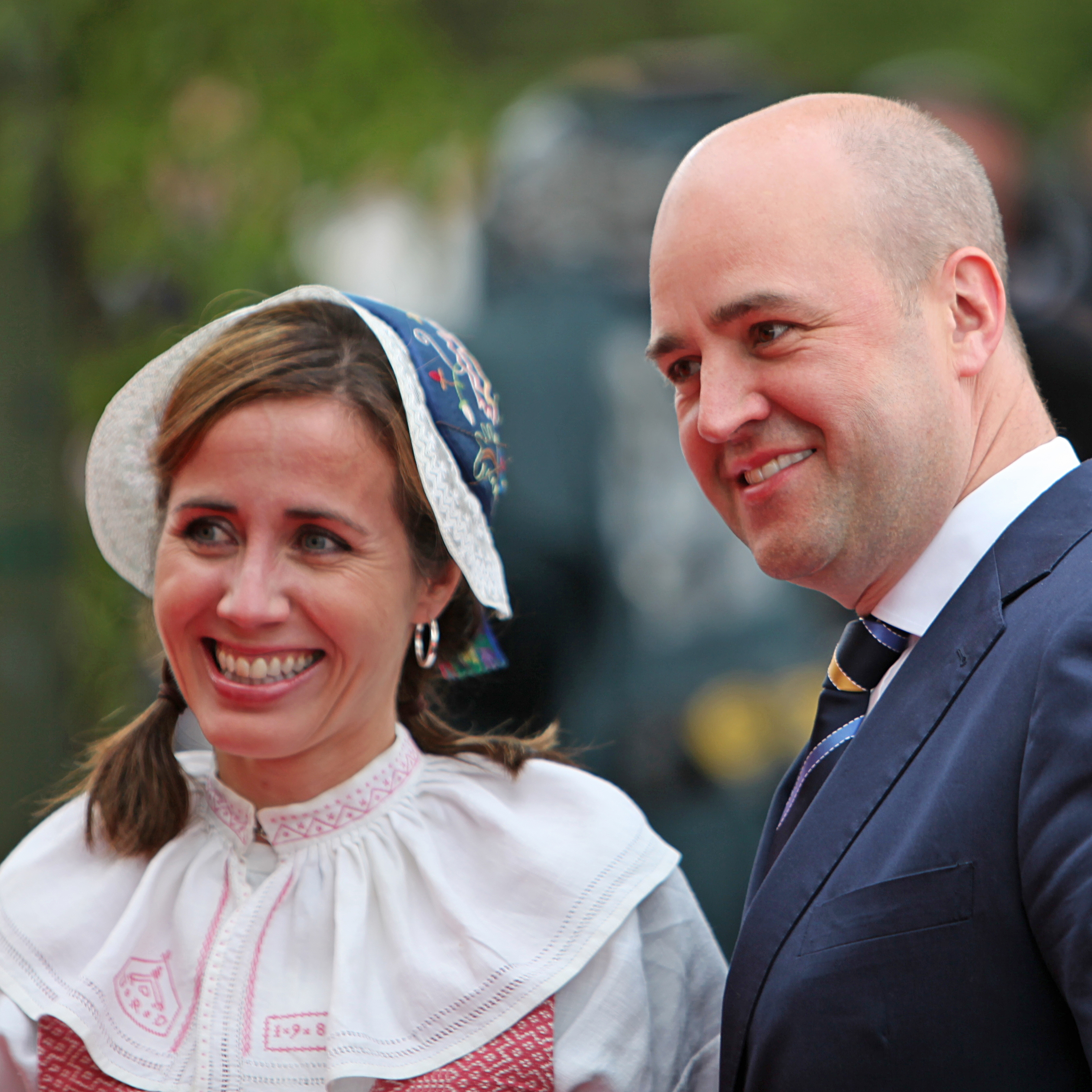
Fredrik Reinfeldt with his then-wife Filippa during the 2009 Swedish National Day celebrations at Skansen, Stockholm.

In 1992, Fredrik Reinfeldt married Filippa Holmberg, the daughter of Senior Captain Cay Holmberg and Ulla Molin. Holmberg was a Stockholm County municipal politician for the Moderate Party. During Fredrik's tenure as prime minister, Filippa Reinfeldt was County Councillor for healthcare issues (Swedish: sjukvårdslandstingsråd) in Stockholm. After being elected prime minister in 2006, Reinfeldt moved into the prime minister's official residence, the Sager House, together with his wife and their three children, Ebba, Gustaf and Erik. On 7 March 2012 it became known that the couple had separated. On 11 July 2012 the couple signed their divorce papers with consideration of 6 months. On 20 February 2013 they signed the last papers which conducted their divorce.

His father Bruno Reinfeldt was also formerly involved in local politics for the Moderate Party in Täby, but left all his political posts in February 2009 after having been arrested and later convicted for drunk driving.

On 23 February 2015, Reinfeldt confirmed that he was now in a relationship with Roberta Alenius. Alenius served as Head of Communications (Chief of the Press Secretaries) at the Cabinet Office from 2006 to 2014, while Reinfeldt served as prime minister. On 2 May 2017, Alenius gave birth to Reinfeldt's fourth child and second daughter. The couple announced in 2022 that they had separated. In August 2025, Reinfeldt married Anna Nordin.

During the 2006 election, it was brought to attention that Reinfeldt's paternal great-great-grandfather, John Hood, was an African American circus director from New York who had a son with Emma Dorotea Reinfeld, a maid from Eckau (now Iecava in present-day Latvia). Emma Dorotea Reinfeld later married the Swede Anders Karlsson, but her illegitimate son John kept his mother's surname. The spelling was later changed to Reinfeldt. He also has Italian ancestry, via his paternal grandmother.

=== Personal opinions ===
He has revealed that his personal distaste for the anti-immigration Sweden Democrats party is based on his partly African ancestry.

Reinfeldt has said that he left the Church of Sweden when he was eighteen years old, critical of the left-leaning perspectives of the church. In an interview as prime minister he however said that he could not state if he believed in God, discussing his belief "that something exist that is not just about the scientific explanation for how the Earth was created. But exactly what it is I don't have an answer for, I am both searching and wondering." He was however married, and had his children baptized in the Church of Sweden.

== Honours ==
=== National honours ===
- (Sweden) Recipient of the King Carl XVI Gustaf's Jubilee Commemorative Medal II (23 August 2013)
- (Sweden) H. M. The King's Medal, 12th size with chain (4 February 2016)

=== Foreign honours ===
- Bulgaria: Order of Stara Planina, 1st Grade (27 September 2007)
- Romania: Order of Faithful Service, Grand Cross (2008)
- Estonia: Order of the Cross of Terra Mariana, 1st Class (18 January 2011)

== Works ==
- Reinfeldt, Fredrik (1993). Söderberg, Christer; Schlingmann, Per (eds.). Det sovande folket [The Sleeping People]. Stockholm: Moderata ungdomsförbundet. ISBN 91-86194-10-0.
- Reinfeldt, Fredrik (1993). Projekt Europa: sex unga européer om Europasamarbetet. Stockholm: Moderata ungdomsförbundet. ISBN 91-86194-06-2.
- Reinfeldt, Fredrik; Schlingmann, Per; Samuelsson, Peter; Widegren, Cecilia (1995). Stenen i handen på den starke. Stockholm: Moderata ungdomsförbundet. ISBN 91-86194-14-3.
- Reinfeldt, Fredrik; Graner, Magnus G.; Lindvall, Martin (1995). Nostalgitrippen. Stockholm: Moderata ungdomsförbundet. ISBN 91-86194-13-5.
- Reinfeldt, Fredrik (2002). Väljarkryss: Personvalshandbok. Stockholm: Moderaterna. OCLC 186327497.
- Reinfeldt, Fredrik; Berglöf, Moa (2010). Framåt tillsammans: Min berättelse om föregångslandet Sverige. Stockholm: Moderaterna. ISBN 978-91-85816-27-9.
- Reinfeldt, Fredrik (2015). Halvvägs. Stockholm: Albert Bonniers Förlag. ISBN 9789100152475.

== Notes ==
Party political offices
Preceded by Ulf Kristersson	Chairman of the Moderate Youth League; 1992–1995	Succeeded by Thomas Idergard
Preceded by Bo Lundgren	Leader of the Moderate Party; 2003–2015	Succeeded by Anna Kinberg Batra
Political offices
Preceded by Bo Lundgren	Leader of the Opposition; 2003–2006	Succeeded by Göran Persson
Preceded by Göran Persson	Prime Minister of Sweden; 2006–2014	Succeeded by Stefan Löfven
Preceded by Jan Fischer	President of the European Council; 2009	Succeeded by Herman Van Rompuy
Preceded by Stefan Löfven	Leader of the Opposition; 2014–2015	Succeeded by Anna Kinberg Batra
Order of precedence
Preceded by Göran Persson as Former Prime Minister	Swedish order of precedence Former Prime Minister	Succeeded by Stefan Löfven as Former Prime Minister
Sporting positions
Preceded by Karl-Erik Nilsson	Chairman of the Swedish Football Association; 2023–2025	Succeeded by Simon Åström
