= Ukraine Compact =

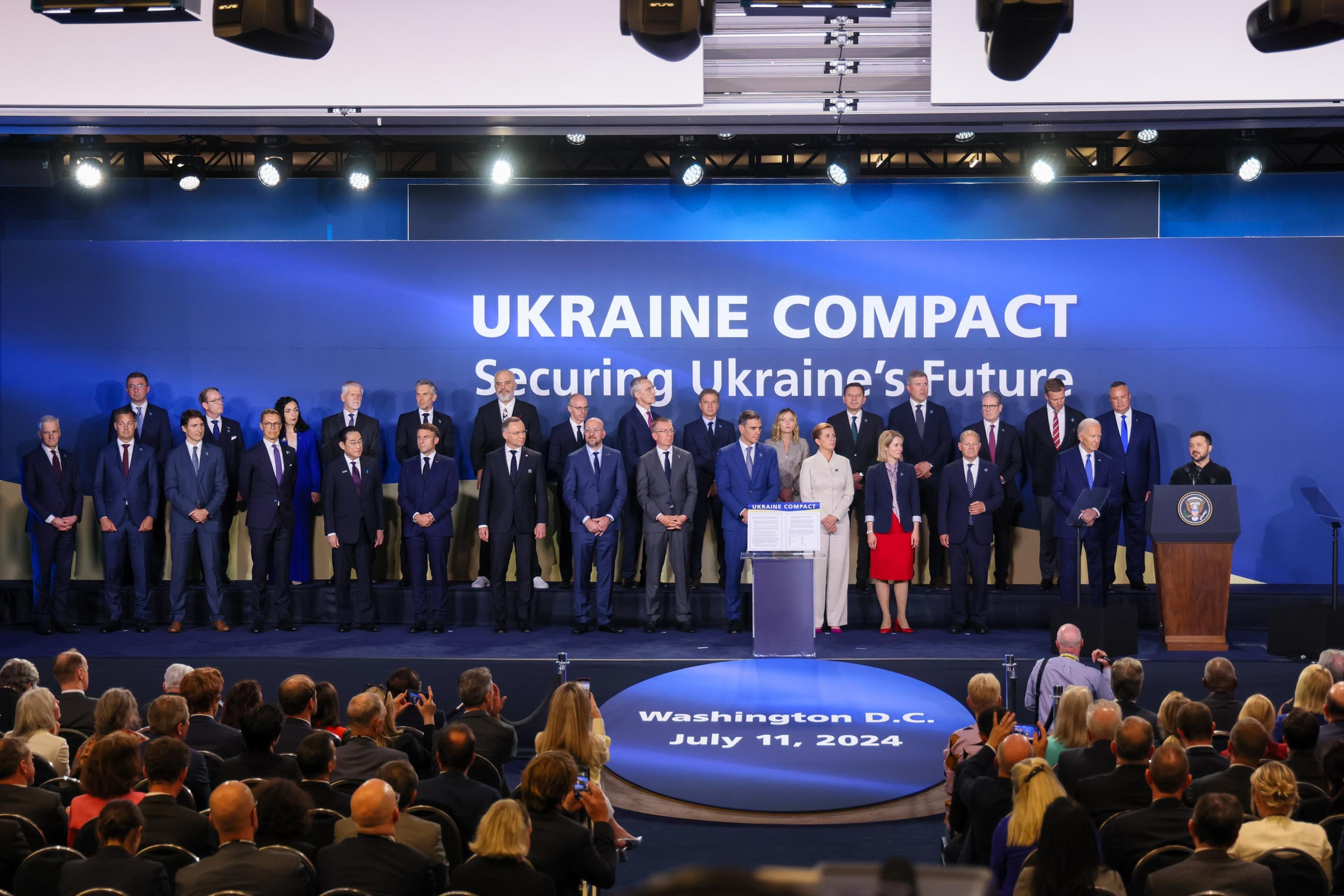
The launch ceremony for the "Ukraine Compact" during the 2024 NATO summit

The Ukraine Compact is a document signed by the leaders of 23 countries on 11 July 2024 in Washington DC when they were at the 33rd NATO Summit. They "Affirm that the security of Ukraine is integral to the security of the Euro-Atlantic region and beyond," and they "intend to support Ukraine until it prevails against Russia’s aggression."

== The Kyiv Security Compact ==
The Ukraine Compact was built on an earlier a set of recommendations by former NATO Secretary General, Anders Fogh Rasmussen called the Kyiv Security Compact.

The Kyiv Security Compact called for a new European security architecture that would guarantee Ukraine's security until the country would be able to join NATO. This would consists of long-term, legally binding bilateral and multi-lateral agreements between Ukraine and its partners, that would help sustain Ukraine's future military force so as to stop the Russian invasion of Ukraine but also prevent and deter future attacks. The agreements would also pave the way for a mechanism to assess new threats and convene the signatories within 24 hours to take further action to deter further threats of aggression.
