= Roberta Alenius =

Swedish jurist and politician

Chief Communications Officer at the Prime Minister's Office
- In office 29 January 2010 – 3 October 2014
- Prime Minister: Fredrik Reinfeldt
- Preceded by: Niclas Bengtsson
- Succeeded by: Odd Guteland

Personal details
- Born: Roberta Runa Enrica Alenius; 29 July 1978 (age 47) Stockholm, Sweden
- Party: Moderate Party
- Domestic partner(s): Fredrik Reinfeldt (2015–2022)
- Children: 1

Roberta Runa Enrica Alenius (born 29 July 1978) is a Swedish politician who served as Press Secretary and as Chief Communications Officer, at the Prime Minister's Office, during the premiership of former Prime Minister Fredrik Reinfeldt from 2006 to 2014.

Alenius was born in Stockholm, Sweden, to an Italian father. Prior to joining the Prime Minister's Office, Alenius worked as an administrator to the Moderate Party in the European Parliament and as a tax advisor at Ernst & Young.

On 23 February 2015, Alenius and Reinfeldt confirmed they were in a relationship. On 14 January 2017, Alenius confirmed they were expecting Reinfeldt's fourth and her first child.
