= Anders Fogh Rasmussen =

Danish politician (born 1953)

Anders Fogh Rasmussen S.K.
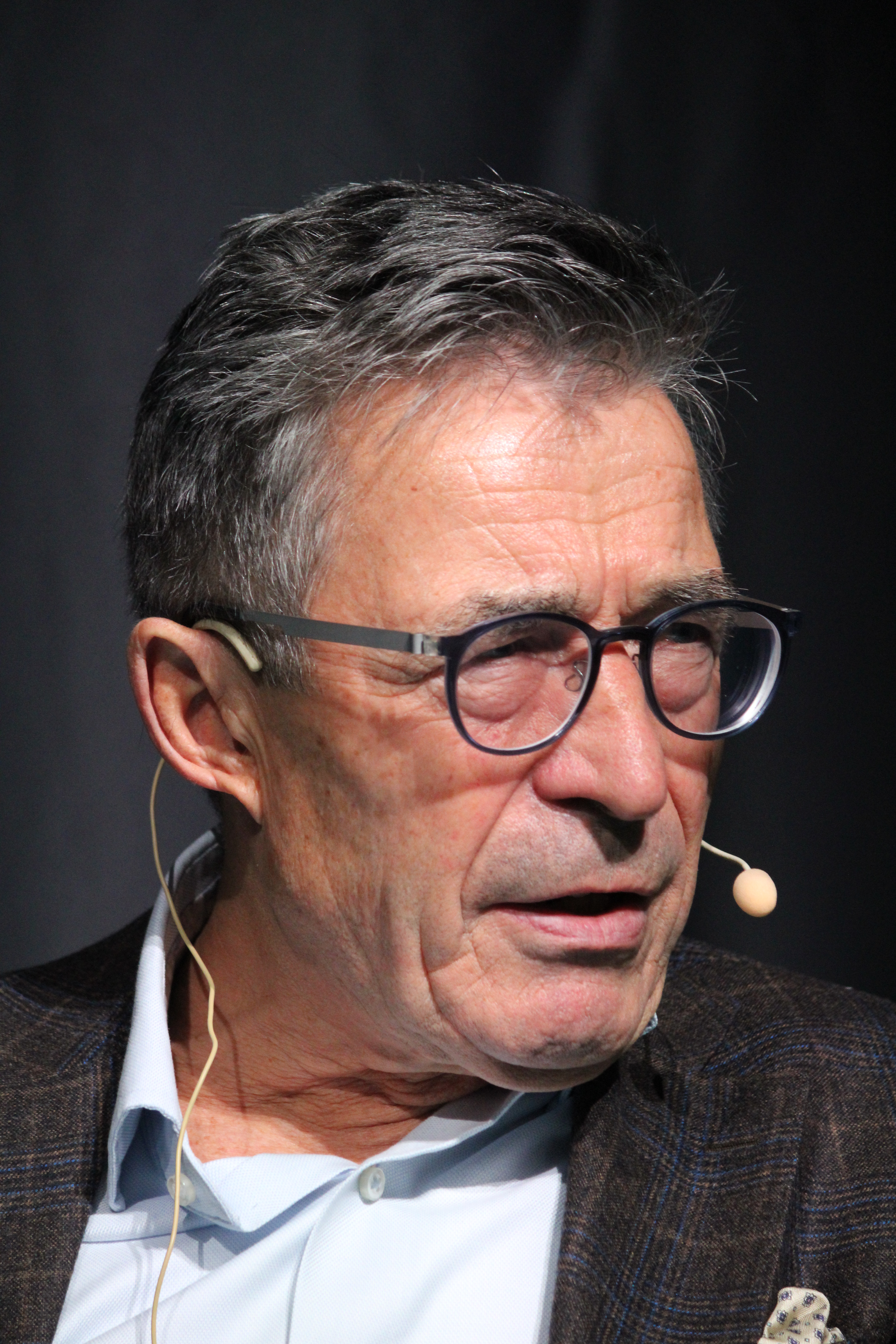
- Rasmussen in 2025

12th Secretary General of NATO
- In office 1 August 2009 – 1 October 2014
- Preceded by: Jaap de Hoop Scheffer
- Succeeded by: Jens Stoltenberg

Prime Minister of Denmark
- In office 27 November 2001 – 5 April 2009
- Monarch: Margrethe II
- Preceded by: Poul Nyrup Rasmussen
- Succeeded by: Lars Løkke Rasmussen

Leader of Venstre
- In office 18 March 1998 – 17 May 2009
- Preceded by: Uffe Ellemann-Jensen
- Succeeded by: Lars Løkke Rasmussen

Minister of Economic Affairs
- In office 18 December 1990 – 19 November 1992
- Prime Minister: Poul Schlüter
- Preceded by: Niels Helveg Petersen
- Succeeded by: Thor Pedersen

Minister of Taxation
- In office 10 September 1987 – 19 November 1992
- Prime Minister: Poul Schlüter
- Preceded by: Isi Foighel
- Succeeded by: Peter Brixtofte

Member of the Folketing
- In office 1 July 1978 – 20 April 2009
- Constituency: Zealand Greater

Personal details
- Born: 26 January 1953 (age 73) Ginnerup, Denmark
- Party: Venstre
- Spouse: Anne-Mette Rasmussen (m. 1978)
- Children: 3
- Parent(s): Knud Rasmussen; Martha Rasmussen
- Education: Aarhus University

Anders Fogh Rasmussen S.K. (Danish: [ˈɑnɐs ˈfɔwˀ ˈʁɑsmusn̩]; born 26 January 1953) is a Danish politician who was the prime minister of Denmark from November 2001 to April 2009 and the secretary general of NATO from August 2009 to October 2014. He became founder of political consultancy Rasmussen Global and founded the Alliance of Democracies Foundation. He serves as a senior adviser to Citigroup. He also served as a senior advisor at the Boston Consulting Group.

Rasmussen was first elected to the Folketing in 1978 and served in various ministerial positions, including Minister of Tax (1987–1992) and Minister of Economic Affairs (1990–1992). In his early career, Rasmussen was a strident critic of the welfare state, writing the classical liberal book From Social State to Minimal State in 1993. However, his views moved towards the political centre through the 1990s. He was elected the leader of the conservative-liberal party Venstre in 1998 and headed a centre-right coalition with the Conservative People's Party which took office in November 2001 and won its second and third terms in February 2005 and in November 2007. Rasmussen's government relied on the Danish People's Party for support, keeping with the Danish tradition of minority government.

His government introduced tougher limits on immigration and a freeze on tax rates (skattestoppet in Danish). Certain taxes were lowered, but his coalition partners in the Conservative People's Party repeatedly argued for more tax cuts and a flat tax rate at no higher than 50%. Rasmussen's government implemented an administrative reform reducing the number of municipalities (kommuner) and replacing the thirteen counties (amter) with five regions which he referred to as "the biggest reform in thirty years". He authored several books about taxation and government structure.

He resigned as prime minister in April 2009 to become Secretary General of NATO, a military alliance that was expanding into Eastern Europe. His term ended on 30 September 2014. He was the first former prime minister since Paul-Henri Spaak of Belgium in 1961 to become Secretary General of NATO.

He became a private consultant on the international stage. He is a Senior Network Member at the European Leadership Network (ELN).

== Personal life ==
Rasmussen was born in 1953 in Ginnerup, Jutland, Denmark, to farmer Knud Rasmussen and Martha Rasmussen (née Fogh). His surname is Rasmussen; Fogh, his mother's maiden name, is his middle name and not considered part of his last name. He is correctly referred to as Rasmussen (not Fogh Rasmussen), unless his full name (including his given name) is used. In Danish media and society, he has often been popularly referred to as Fogh Rasmussen, or merely Anders Fogh, when not referred to by his full name, mainly to distinguish him from other prominent politicians in the country with the same family name.

He matriculated in languages and social studies from Viborg Cathedral School, in 1969–1972 and studied economics at the University of Aarhus, graduating in 1978. He has been active in politics most of his life and has authored several books about taxation and government structure. He and his wife Anne-Mette married in 1978 and have three children and six grandchildren.

As an amateur cyclist, Rasmussen completed part of the notorious Alpe d'Huez stage of the 2008 Tour de France the day after the professional race took place. His attendance at Le Tour was at the invitation of Danish former cyclist Bjarne Riis.

He is of no relation to either his predecessor Poul Nyrup Rasmussen, nor his successor Lars Løkke Rasmussen as Prime Minister of Denmark.

Rasmussen received the America Award of the Italy-USA Foundation in 2017.

== Early political career ==
He has held positions in government and opposition throughout his career, first winning a seat in the Folketing (Danish parliament) in 1978.

=== Politics ===
In general, Rasmussen is in favour of centralisation, privatisation and limiting the size of government.

Rasmussen wrote the book From Social State to Minimal State (Danish: Fra socialstat til minimalstat) in 1993, in which he advocated an extensive reform of the Danish welfare system along classic liberal lines. In particular, he favours lower taxes and less government interference in corporate and individual matters. In 1993 he was awarded the Adam Smith award by the libertarian society Libertas, partly because of this book.

=== Resignation as Minister of Taxation ===
From 1987 to 1990 he was Minister for Taxation and from 1990 Minister for Economy and Taxation in the Conservative-led Poul Schlüter government.

In 1992 Rasmussen resigned from his ministerial posts after a report from a commission of inquiry had decided that he had provided the Folketing with inaccurate and incomplete information regarding his decision to postpone payment of several bills from Regnecentralen and Kommunedata from one accounting year to the next. Rasmussen disagreed with the findings of the commission, but faced with the threat of a motion of no confidence, he left his posts voluntarily.

=== 2001 election ===
His Liberal (Venstre) Party won power in the November 2001 election, defeating the Social Democratic government of Poul Nyrup Rasmussen and enabling him to form his first cabinet. That election marked a dramatic change in Danish politics. It was the first time since 1920 that the Social Democratic Party lost its position as the largest party in the Folketing (parliament), mainly due to a loss of working class votes to Dansk Folkeparti (The Danish People's Party).

== Prime Minister of Denmark ==
Following the 2001 election, Venstre formed a government in a parliamentary coalition with the Conservative People's Party to form a minority government with the parliamentary support of Dansk Folkeparti. Together these three parties survived both the 2005 election and the 2007 election.

After becoming prime minister, Rasmussen distanced himself from his earlier writings and announced the death of neoliberalism during the national elections of 2005. Commonly regarded to have been inspired by the success of Tony Blair, Rasmussen now seemed more in favour of the theories of Anthony Giddens and his third way. There was talk in Libertas of revoking Fogh Rasmussen's award as a result of this, though this never happened.

His government enacted tough measures designed to limit the number of immigrants coming to Denmark, specifically as asylum seekers or through arranged marriages. However, his governments depended on the support of Dansk Folkeparti, and it is impossible to draw a clear dividing line between his personal ideology and the required compromises with Dansk Folkeparti.

=== Tax reform ===
After the 2001 elections, Venstre banned all tax increases. Venstre campaigned by claiming that taxes had been growing constantly during the previous eight years under the Social Democrats. While the overall tax burden was more or less unchanged from 1993 until 2001, there was a shift from the taxation of income, both corporate and personal, to a personal consumption (especially through the "ecological taxes" (da. grønne afgifter)), which gave the average citizen the impression of rising taxes.

This "tax stop" was criticised by left wing parties, allegedly for being "antisocial" and "only for the rich." Since the tax stop also froze the tax on real property (da. ejendomsværdiskat, 1%), it was beneficial to homeowners in densely populated regions that had experienced rising real estate values. The property tax was set at a nominal level – not at a relative level. While the rate was one percent when the tax stop was enacted, the rate is much less today when recent increases in property value (+20%/p.a. in large cities) are considered. The Danish Economic Council criticized this as unfairly benefiting current homeowners.

Even though the total tax burden was marginally higher in 2005 than in 2001, the tax stop was popular among voters. Thus, in January 2005, the Social Democrats announced that they accepted the principle of a tax stop until at least one right-wing party was willing to participate in tax reform.

The tax stop has, however, been ineffective, judging by Venstre's intentions. Its goal was to halt the growth of public expenditures (and halt the growth of taxes), but even with cuts in public spending (which were considered aggressive by the political left wing), overall spending continued to rise by approximately one percentage point above inflation each year.

From 2004 and onwards, minor tax cuts came into effect, on two accounts:

1. People with jobs got a 3% tax reduction on the 5.5% "bottom tax" (da. bundskat).
2. An "employment deduction" (da. beskæftigelsesfradrag) was introduced. This initiative was to encourage people to get off welfare and take jobs instead.
3. The bottom limit of the "middle tax" (da. mellemskat) of 6%, was raised by 12.000 DKK every year, over the next four years. This was supposed to limit the income stresses of middle incomes and families with children.

In 2009 a major tax reform was implemented. The overall marginal tax rate was reduced by 7.5%. In the end, the top tax rate (topskatten) was not changed, but the income level at which it applied was raised. This removed 350,000 Danes from the top tax bracket. The medium tax rate was eliminated, and the lowest was reduced by 1.5%. Various other tax reforms were enacted such as an increase in the old age pension, incentives for renovation, and various initiatives designed to improve energy efficiency. Finance Minister, Lars Lokke Rasmussen, called it the biggest reduction in the marginal tax rate since the introduction of income tax in 1903. In 2009 tax revenue was 777,375 million Krone. It had grown to 831,172 million in 2011, 901,001 million in 2013, 954,473 million in 2015, and 995,058 million in 2017. It's important to note that from 2011 to 2015 Social Democrat Helle Thorning-Schmidt was the prime minister, however, she passed a tax-reform with support from the liberal-conservative opposition. It raised the top tax threshold, effectively lowering tax rates for high income earners.

=== 2002 EU Presidency ===
Rasmussen held the rotating presidency of the European Union from July to December 2002, proving his dedication to a pro-EU agenda and the guiding principles of the Ellemann-Jensen doctrine. He pursued this to its logical conclusion by publicly denouncing the Danish collaboration policy during its second World War occupation, the first official apology on behalf of Denmark for this.

=== War in Iraq ===
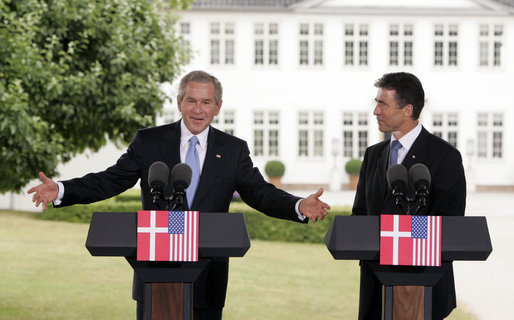
Under Rasmussen, Denmark supported American foreign policies.

As prime minister, Rasmussen strongly supported the 2003 Iraq War. As in most European countries he faced considerable opposition, both in the parliament and in the general population. Subsequent opinion polls suggested the Danish population's opinion was split on the issue. One vocal protester managed to get into the Danish parliament during the period before the war, where he poured red paint on the prime minister while yelling "Du har blod på dine hænder" (literally: "You have blood on your hands"). A member of the Danish parliament for the socialist Red-Green Alliance, Pernille Rosenkrantz-Theil, stated that it was a reaction she might have made under the circumstances, although she later denounced such behaviour. Denmark was one of only five countries to take part in the actual invasion operations (the others being the U.S., UK, Poland and Australia) though the contingent mainly consisted of two minor warships and staff and radio units that were never involved in actual combat. In the months after the initial phase of the war, Danish troops participated in the multi-national force stationed in Iraq. Approximately 550 Danish troops were stationed in Iraq from 2004 and into 2007, first at "Camp Dannevang" and later at "Camp Einherjer", both near Basra. When the contingent of troops left around August 2007, it was not replaced and Denmark shifted its focus to non-military support around Baghdad. The official reason provided is that the Iraqi government should now be able to handle security in the Basra area. Critics of Rasmussen argued that the withdrawal was motivated by decreasing domestic support for the war.

In 2004 Rasmussen's government came under attack based on questions of how much intelligence it had with regard to Iraqi weapons of mass destruction. The government held hearings, and was forced to publish classified reports it had consulted about the likelihood of banned weapons existing in Iraq. While the Blair and Bush administrations became the subject of criticism for extended periods because of their reliance on questionable intelligence, Rasmussen stayed clear of this controversy. This is probably largely because the motion passed by parliament (Folketinget) authorising the deployment of Danish troops states as the reason for the deployment Iraq's continued refusal to cooperate with UN inspectors in violation of the UN Security Council's resolution. The Danish deployment of troops was thus not formally based on a claim that Iraq had WMD's.

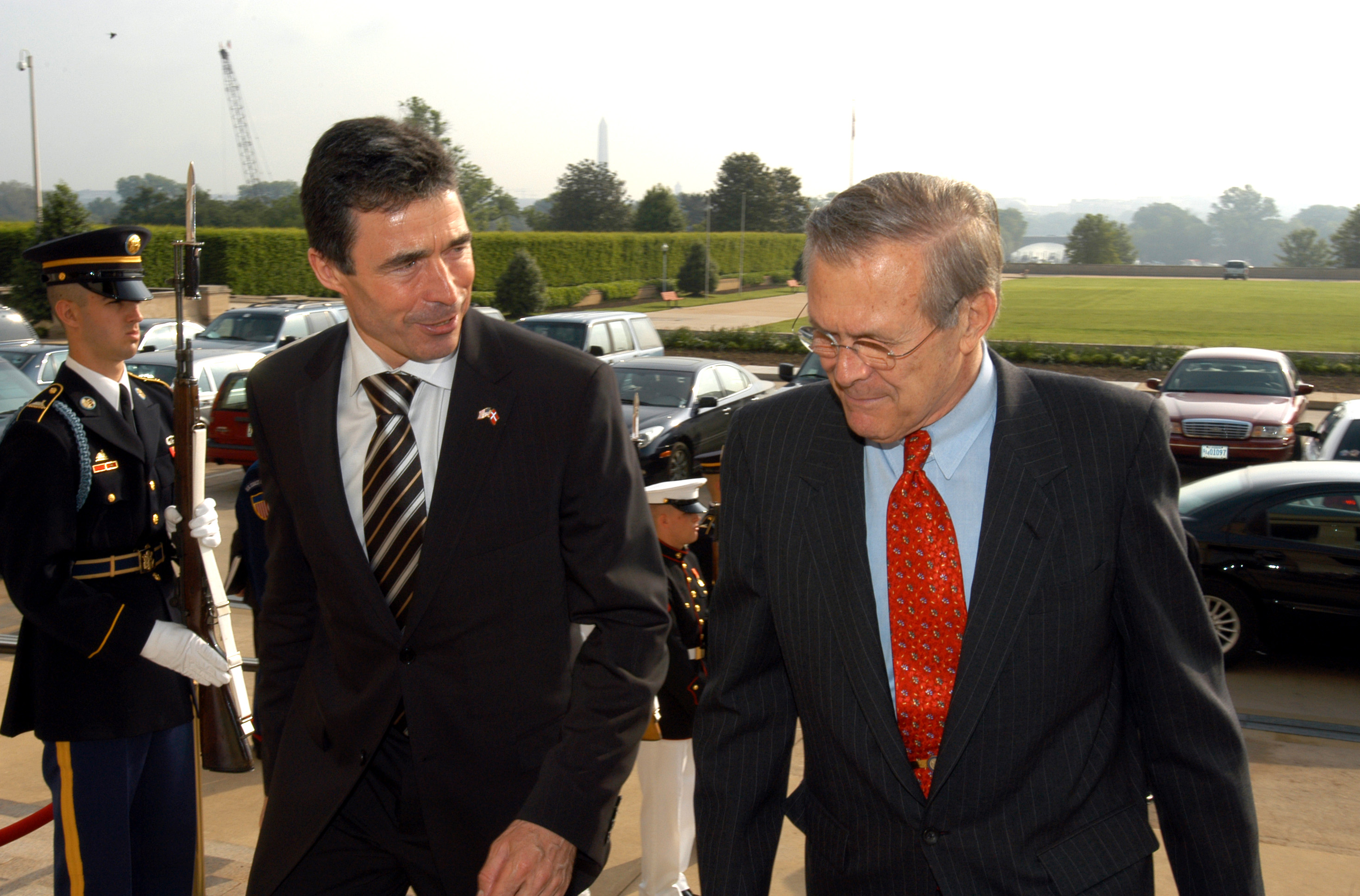
Secretary of Defense Donald H. Rumsfeld escorts Rasmussen into the Pentagon on 8 May 2003.

In March 2003, Rasmussen stated as one of the reasons to support a military intervention:

Irak har masseødelæggelsesvåben. Det er ikke noget vi tror. Vi ved det. Irak har selv indrømmet, at det har haft sennepsgas, nervegas, miltbrand, men Saddam vil ikke afregne. Han vil ikke fortælle os, hvor og hvordan de våben er blevet destrueret. Det ved vi fra FN's inspektører, så der er ingen tvivl i mit sind.

In English, this translates to:

Iraq has weapons of mass destruction. This is not something we think. We know it. Iraq has itself admitted that it had mustard gas, nerve gas, anthrax, but Saddam will not settle. He will not tell us where and how the weapons have been destroyed. We know from the UN inspectors, so there is no doubt in my mind.

=== Gay marriage ===
Civil unions between gay couples became legal in Denmark in 1989. In January 2004, Rasmussen stated his belief that homosexuals should be able to marry in religious ceremonies, which were not allowed at the time in the Evangelical Lutheran State Church of Denmark, but he has said it should be up to religious communities to decide whether to perform ceremonies for gay couples.

=== 2005 election ===
On 18 January 2005 Rasmussen called an election for 8 February 2005. He delayed the call by a couple of weeks because of the 2004 Indian Ocean earthquake which killed several Danes. His government was criticized for its allegedly slow response to that crisis, although a clear majority applauded the government's actions.

Although his party's support was reduced from the 2001 election, costing it four seats, Venstre was able to maintain its coalition through gains by other parties, and on 18 February Rasmussen formed the Cabinet of Anders Fogh Rasmussen II.

Rasmussen received the most "personal votes" ever of any politician in the Folketing (Denmark's Parliament) with 61,792.

=== Muhammad cartoons and Danish goods boycott ===
A major period of conflict in Rasmussen's political career concerned a set of cartoons printed in Jyllands-Posten, a major Danish newspaper. In September 2005 the newspaper printed a full page with 12 cartoons depicting various interpretations of Muhammad. Due to the cartoons portraying Muhammad as a terrorist, some Muslims found the cartoons offensive. Rasmussen denied a request from 11 ambassadors of Middle-Eastern countries to discuss the issue. Rasmussen described the controversy as Denmark's worst international crisis since World War II. Later he stated, that he "was deeply distressed that the cartoons were seen by some Muslims as an attempt by Denmark to mark and insult or behave disrespectfully towards Islam or Mohammed."

=== Municipal reform ===
One of Rasmussen's main initiatives was the introduction of municipal reform, the aim of which was the geographic and administrative consolidation of smaller municipalities and the abolition of counties. Major areas of public services, such as the national health service, were consolidated into five regional bodies, while the number of municipalities was reduced from 271 to 98. The reform was ratified on 16 June 2005 and was effective as of 1 January 2007.

=== 2007 election and resignation ===
In October 2007, Rasmussen called the 2007 general election, which was held on 13 November. His official reason for doing so was to allow parliament to face important upcoming decisions without being distracted by a future election, with welfare reform being cited as an example. Initial polls had predicted that neither the incumbent alliance nor the left-wing opposition would win a majority, leaving the centrist New Alliance with the balance of power.

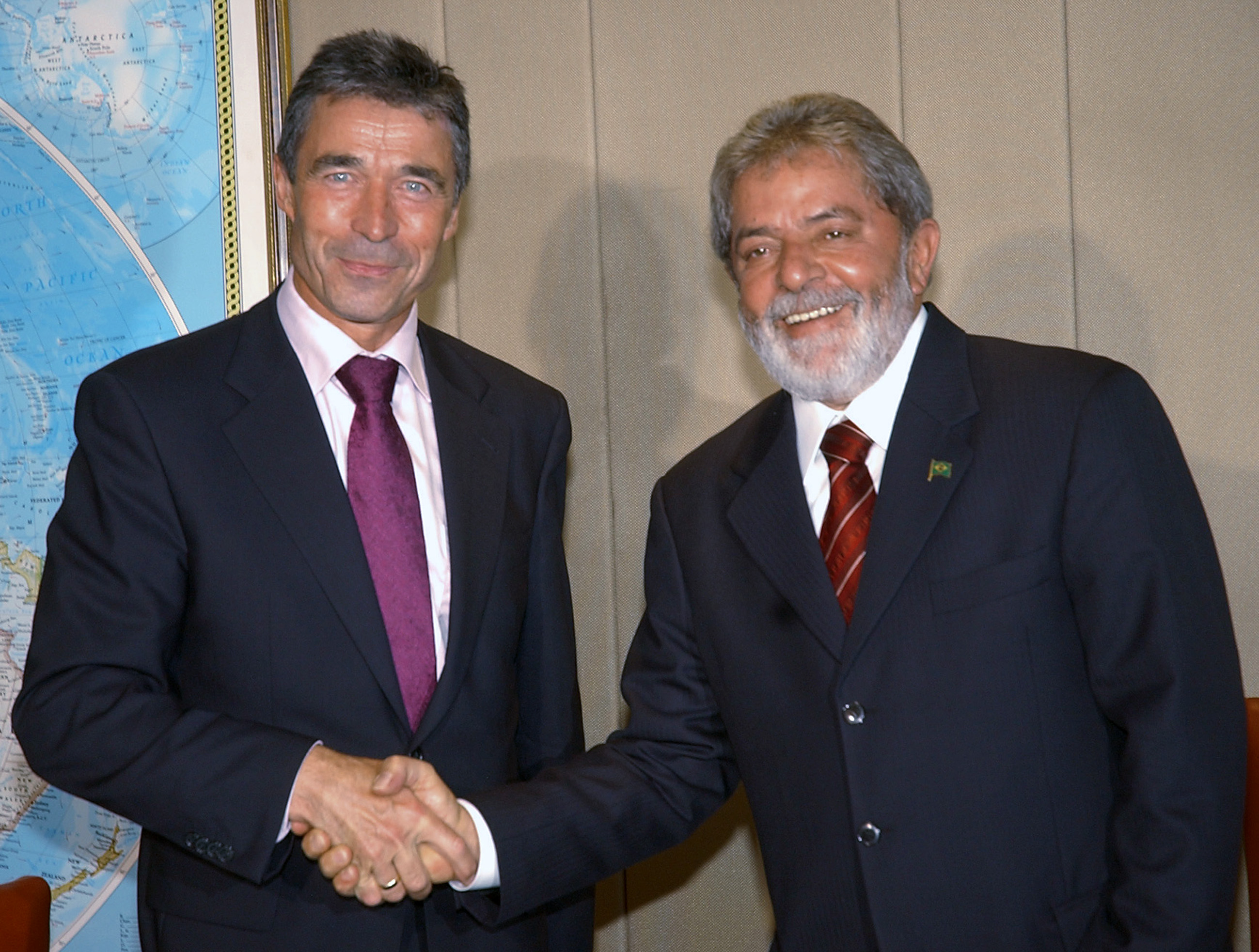
Rasmussen in Brazil with Lula da Silva, 25 April 2007

At 11:30 p.m. on the night of the election, Rasmussen claimed victory on the basis of almost-complete results. By the morning of 14 November 2007, after results came through from the Faroe Islands and Greenland, his centre-right coalition of the Liberals, the Conservative People's Party and the Danish People's Party secured 90 seats, the minimum number required for a majority. Rasmussen went on to become the longest-ruling Liberal Prime Minister of Denmark.

Shortly after his second reelection in 2007, rumours began to spread in the Danish media that Rasmussen was a candidate for high-profile international jobs. A first rumour was that he was informally one of the top candidates for the new position of President of the European Council that could be created when the Lisbon Treaty would come into effect. Following the Irish rejection of the treaty in June 2008, it became obvious that this position would not be created in the near future. Rumors then spread around Rasmussen's candidacy for Secretary General of NATO. Rasmussen denied the rumors until a few days before the official announcement of his selection was made.

Rasmussen expressed support for Israel's right to defend itself during the Gaza–Israel conflict. He said that, "it was Hamas that broke the truce, and Hamas started the conflict by firing rockets on Israel. No country can just passively accept being fired on."

After he was confirmed as the NATO Secretary General, Rasmussen announced that he would resign as Prime Minister of Denmark on 5 April 2009.

== NATO Secretary General ==
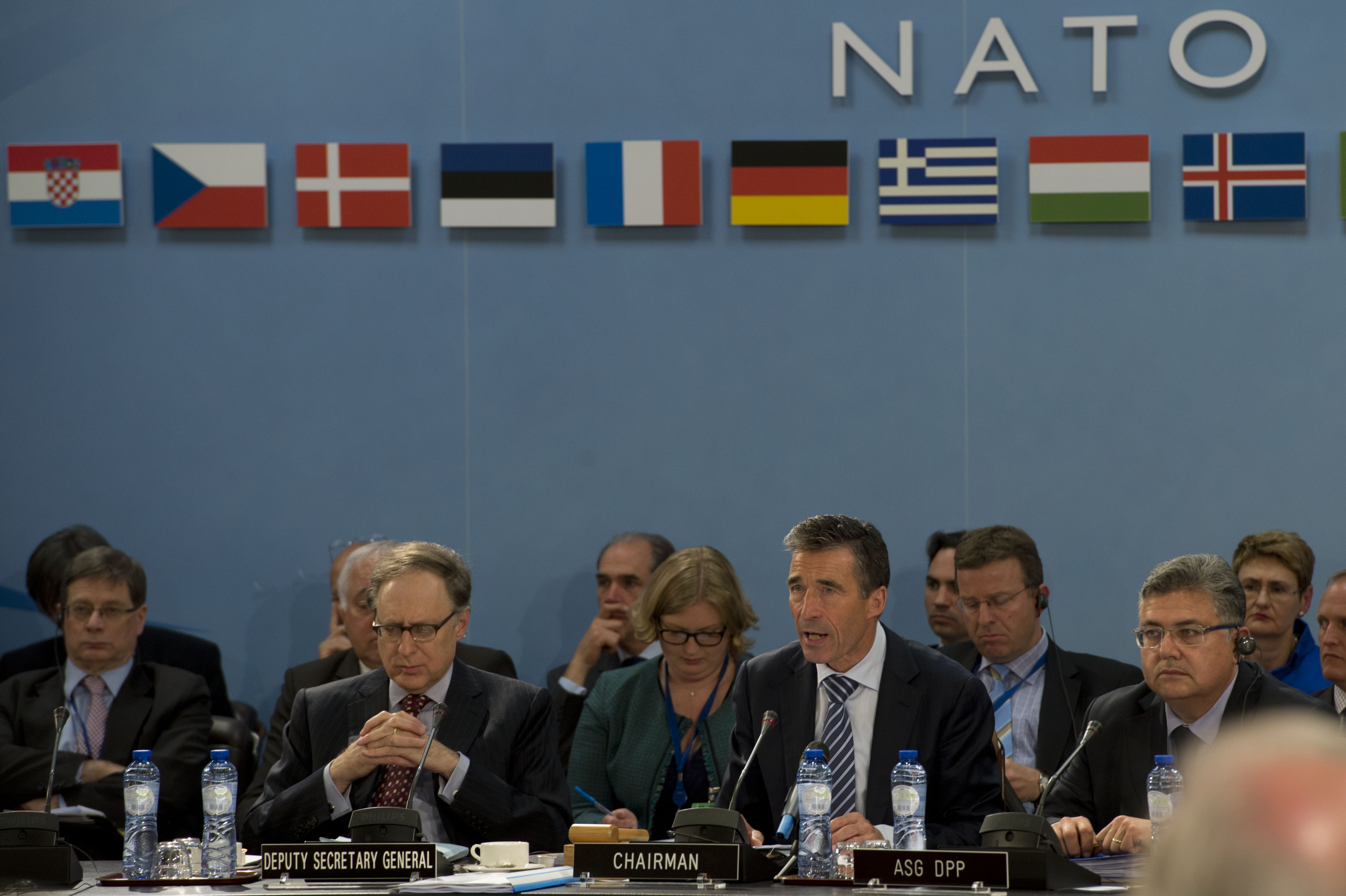
Rasmussen took over as Secretary General of NATO in August 2009.

=== 2009 ===
Anders Fogh Rasmussen became the 12th NATO Secretary General on 1 August 2009, succeeding Jaap de Hoop Scheffer, who held the post from 2004 until 2009. The announcement was made on 4 April 2009, at the 2009 Strasbourg–Kehl summit in Strasbourg. During the final selection process only one country, Turkey, remained opposed to Rasmussen's candidacy, partly because of his handling of the cartoon episode in 2005, when the publication in some Danish newspapers of cartoons of Muhammad caused violent protests. Another major element of Turkey's opposition was Denmark's tolerance of Roj TV, which is claimed by the Turkish government to be a mouthpiece for the Kurdistan Workers Party (PKK). Eventually, Turkey withdrew its opposition to Rasmussen's appointment in exchange of assurances Roj TV would be closed down.

After his accession on 1 August 2009, Rasmussen's first mission was a visit to Afghanistan, where he met with President Karzai and senior Afghan ministers, including Minister for Foreign Affairs Spanta, Minister for Defence General Wardak, and Minister of Interior Atmar to discuss the then impending presidential and provincial council elections.

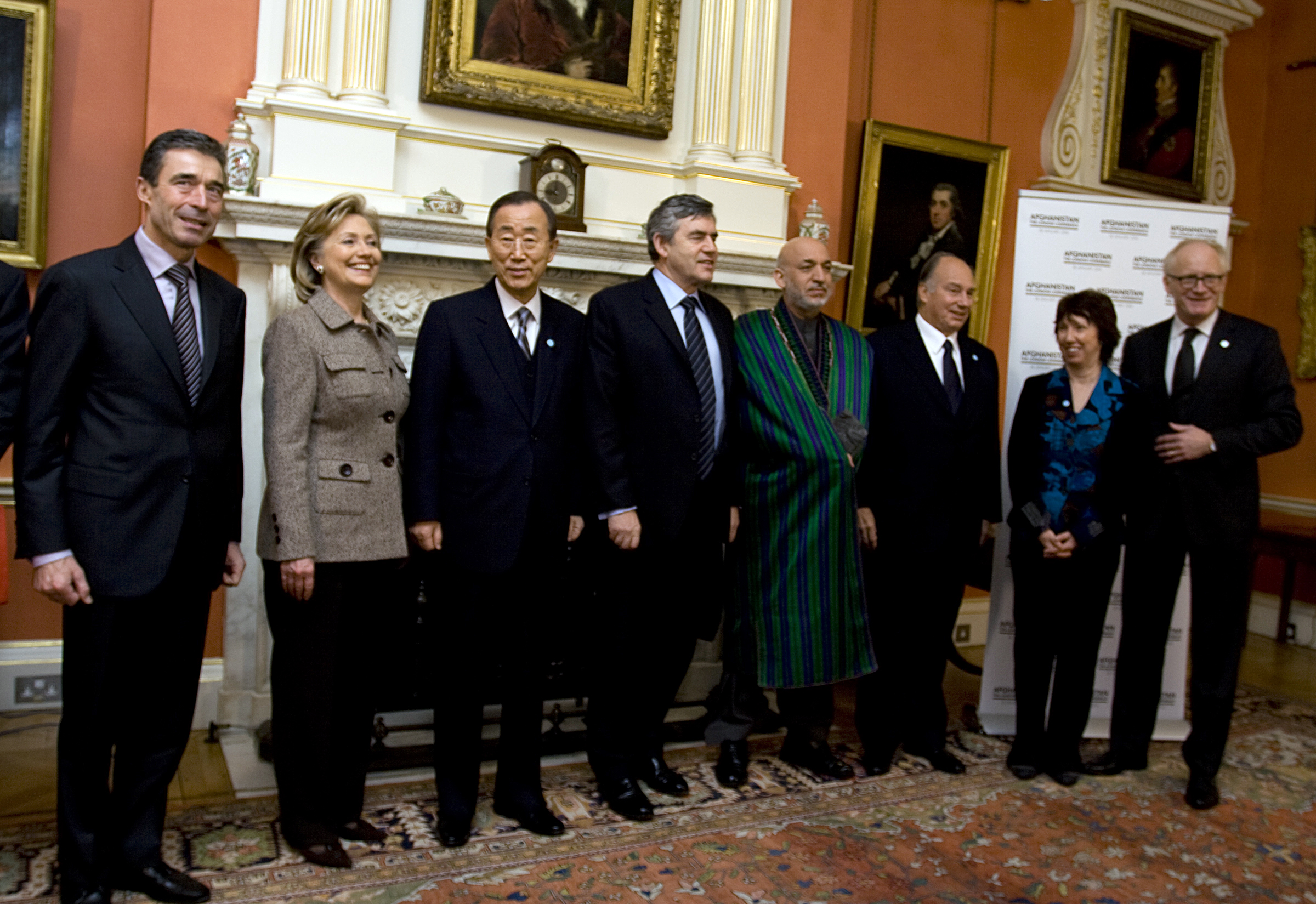
World leaders host Hamid Karzai at the London Conference on Afghanistan, 28 January 2010

=== 2010 ===
On 28 January 2010 Rasmussen attended the 2010 International Conference on Afghanistan at Lancaster House in London. It was at this event that the framework for the next decade of the Islamic Republic of Afghanistan was settled by the Afghan president Hamid Karzai and his successor Ashraf Ghani and their donors. As seen at right, Gordon Brown, Hillary Clinton, Catherine Ashton and Hermann van Rompuy amongst other Western leaders were in attendance.

=== 2011 ===
In April 2011, in relation to the 2011 Libyan civil war Rasmussen said that on the day NATO started taking command of the mission under the U.N. mandate, the alliance ruled out arming the rebels. Rasmussen said the coalition under his control was clear about its mission. "We are not in Libya to arm people. We are in Libya to protect civilians against attacks" from loyalists of the country's Muammar Gaddafi government, he said at that time.

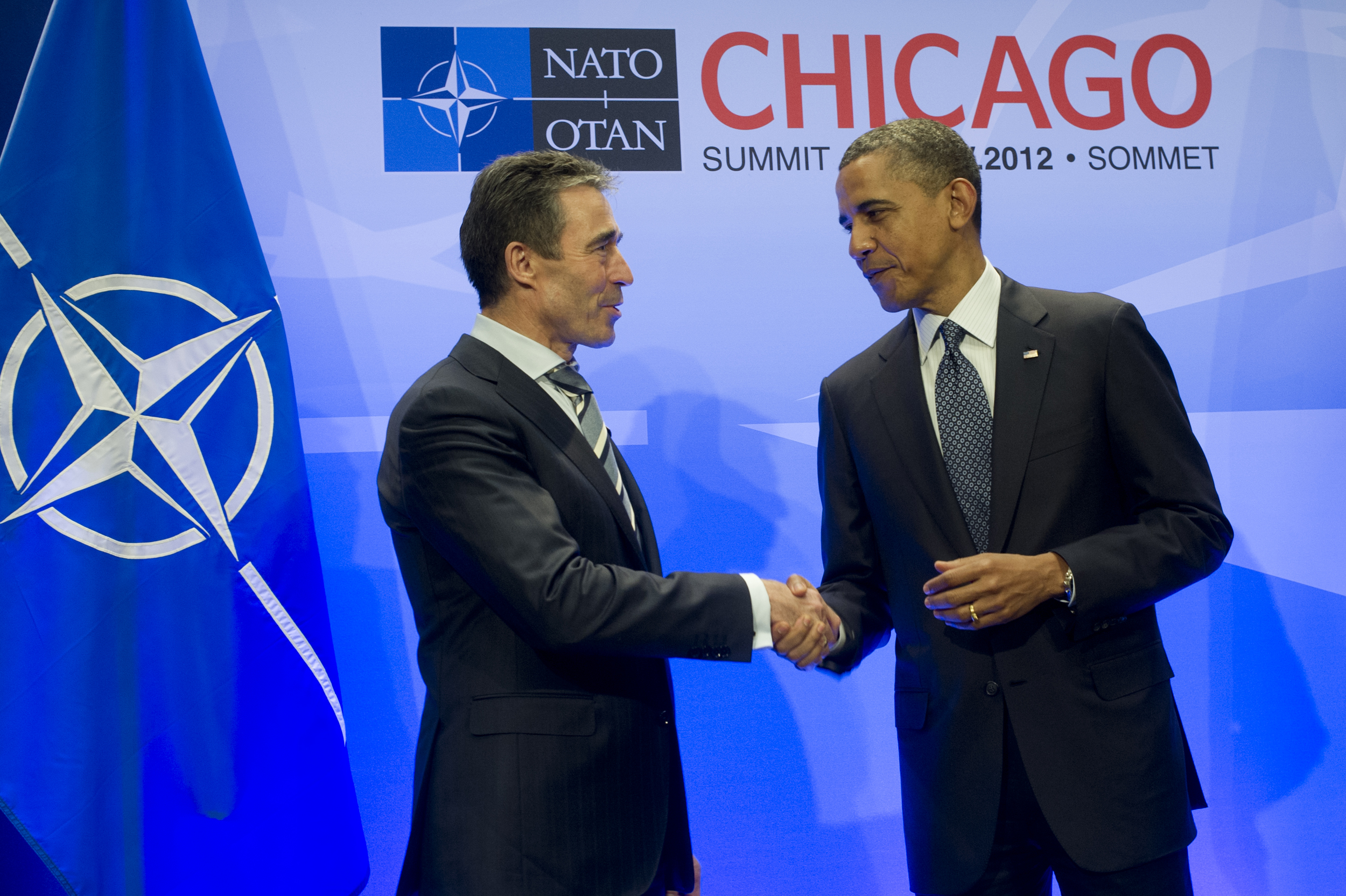
U.S. President Barack Obama thanks Rasmussen at the opening of the NATO summit in Chicago, 20 May 2012.

In October 2011, the intensive 7-month NATO intervention had "now moved much closer" to its end, according to Rasmussen. The last two major outposts of Gaddafi loyalists—Gaddafi's hometown of Sirte and the town of Bani Walid—had fallen and the deposed leader had been killed as he tried to flee from Sirte toward Misrata. Gaddafi's killing came with close NATO aerial support of Libyan ground forces.

=== 2012 ===
The Secretary General normally serves for a term of four years with a one-year extension option. On 3 October 2012, Fogh Rasmussens term was extended one year, so it ended on 31 July 2014.

=== 2013 ===
In February 2013 in the first visit of a NATO Secretary General to Ireland for a meeting with EU defence ministers, he said NATO had an "open-door policy" towards membership of the organisation. "Our door remains open for European countries, European democracies that fulfil the necessary criteria and can contribute to Euro-Atlantic security, but of course it's for individual partners to decide how they want to develop their relationship and partnership with NATO." Ireland is not a member of the organisation but ties through the Partnership for Peace Programme (PFP), a bilateral programme that allows for Irish forces to be used for peacekeeping and crisis management where there is a UN mandate and parliamentary approval.

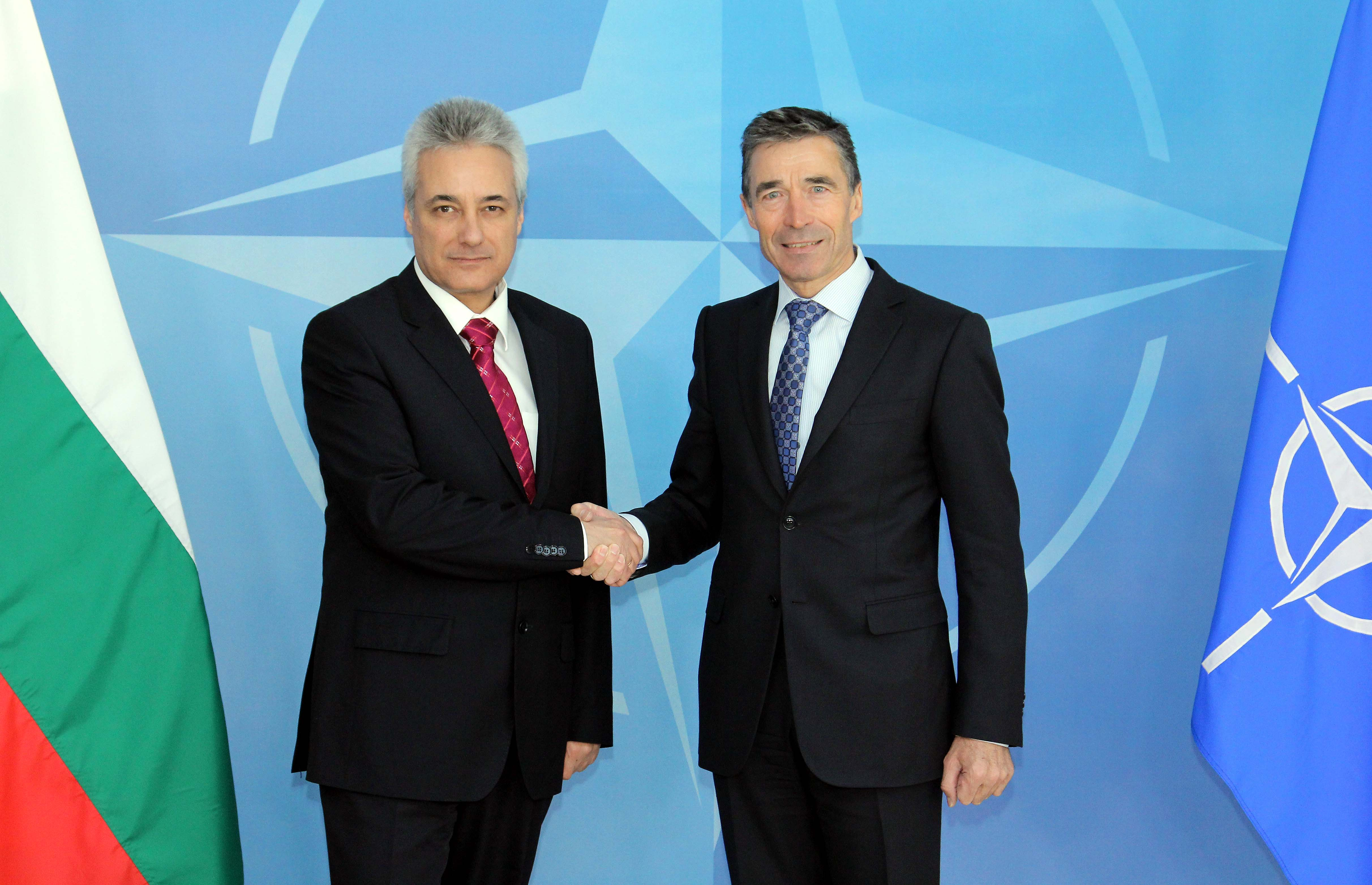
Bulgarian Prime Minister Marin Raykov with Rasmussen in Brussels, on 27 March 2013.

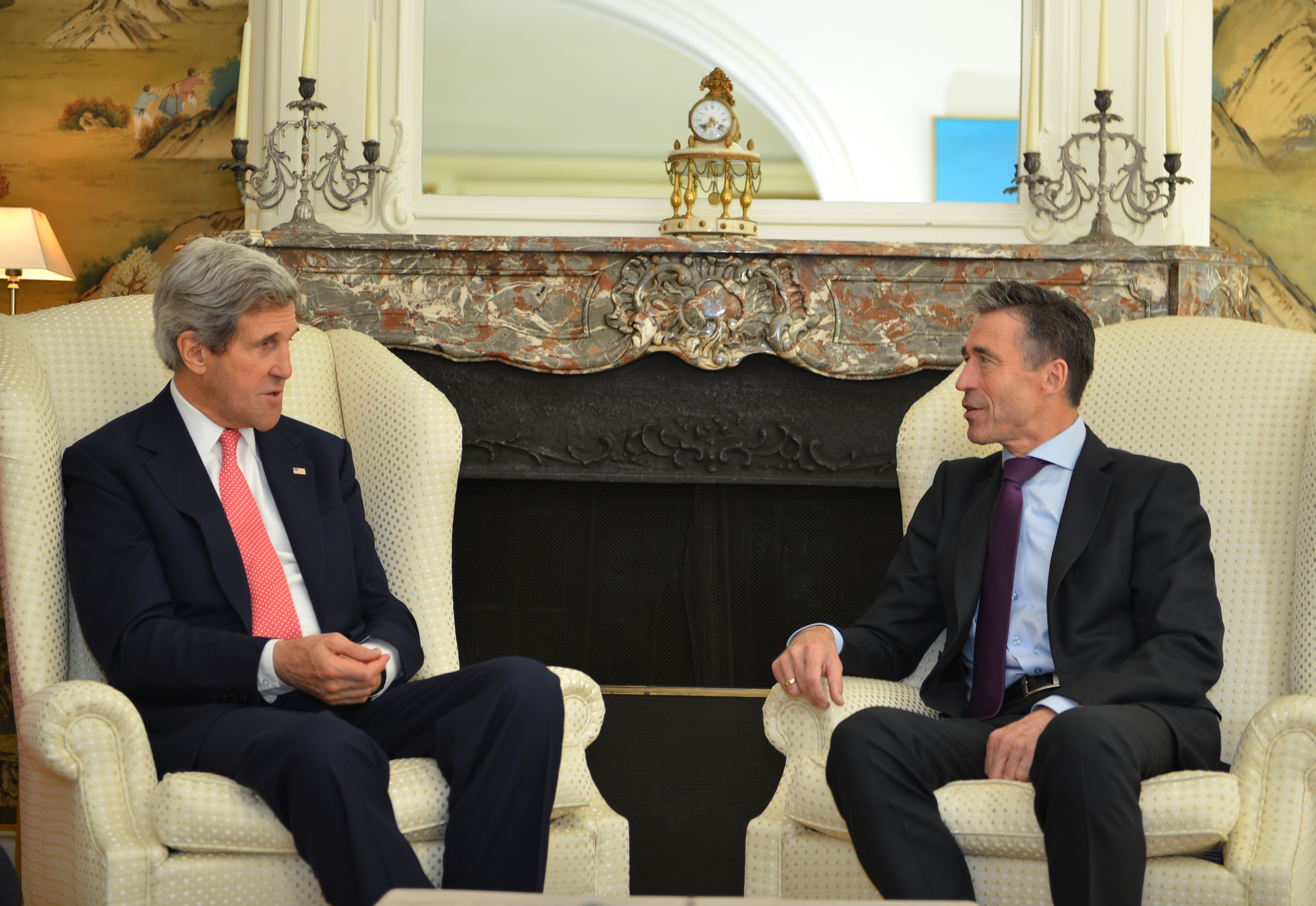
U.S. Secretary of State John Kerry with Rasmussen in Brussels, on 22 April 2013.

On 19 December 2013 Rasmussen was invited to speak at a periodic meeting of the European Council by the Prime Minister of the UK, David Cameron, in opposition to plans proposed by the External Action Service of HRUFASC Catherine Ashton to create a European Air Force composed of surveillance drones, heavy transport airplanes, and air-to-air refuelling planes. This plan was supported by France, Spain, Italy, Poland and Germany who together have QMV majority. Rasmussen's position was opposed to that of European Parliament President Martin Schulz, who made a presentation at the same meeting where he said that "If we wish to defend our values and interests, if we wish to maintain the security of our citizens, then a majority of MEPs consider that we need a headquarters for civil and military missions in Brussels and deployable troops." Rasmussen was satisfied with the role of NATO in European defence matters and saw every reason to maintain the status quo.

=== 2014 ===
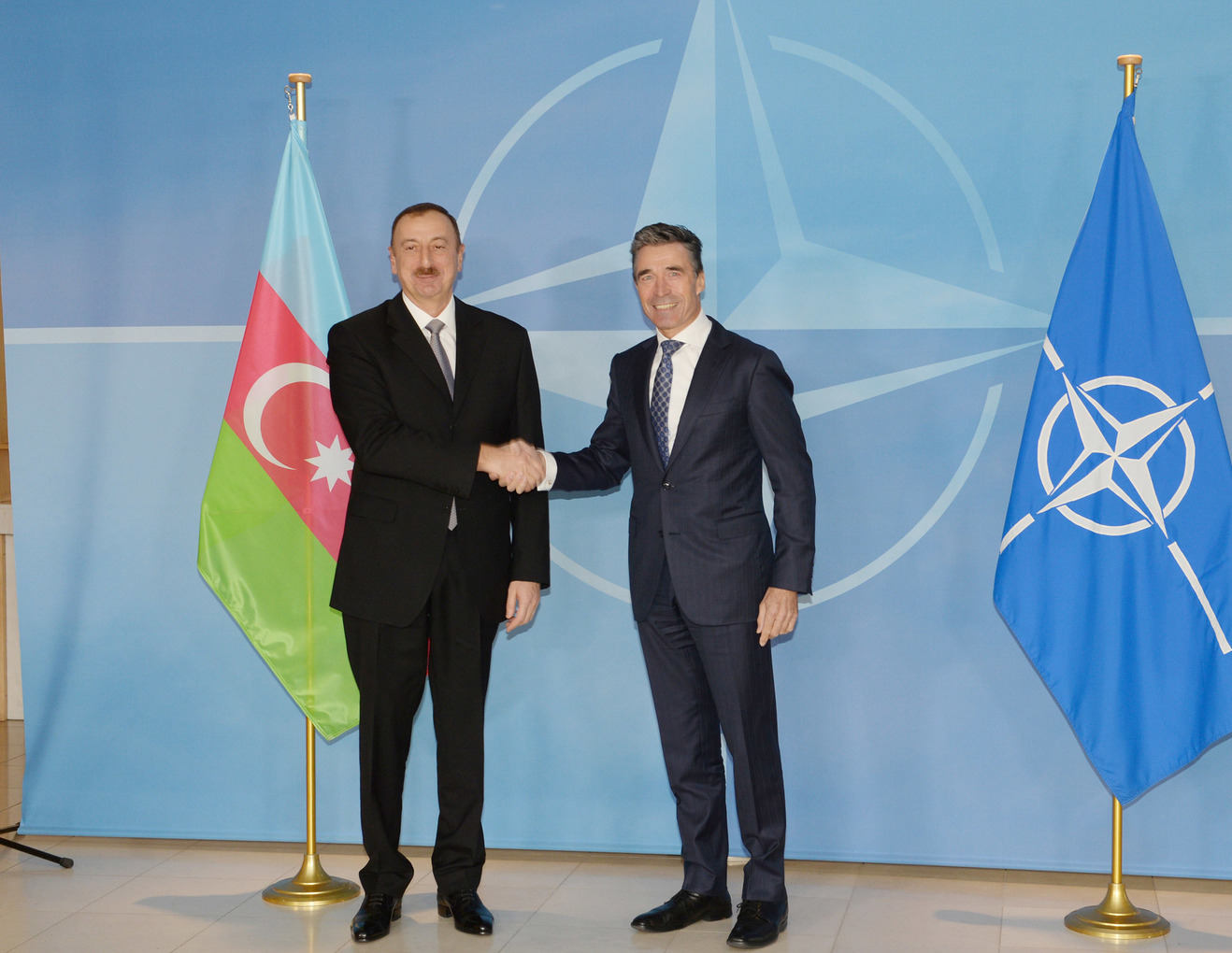
Azerbaijani President Ilham Aliyev with Rasmussen in Brussels, on 15 January 2014.

On 28 March 2014, Jens Stoltenberg was nominated as Rasmussen's successor as secretary-general. He was to take office on 1 October 2014.

During the first week of April, the Foreign Ministers met at Brussels NATO HQ.

On 6 April, Rasmussen wrote an op-ed piece in London's The Daily Telegraph to warn allies to invest in their armed forces, and to maintain that "Russia's illegal aggression against Ukraine and its continued breach of international law" were clear. Russian Foreign Ministry blamed Rasmussen for his "active employment of double standards."

On 15 April, an EU Defence Ministers' meeting took place in Luxembourg with the Secretary-General. The next day, the Defence Ministers meeting of the North Atlantic Council was convened, one day in advance of the meeting in Geneva between Russia, Ukraine, the US and the EU over the Annexation of Crimea by the Russian Federation. Rasmussen said: "NATO's core task is to protect and defend our Allies. We have already taken a series of steps, including enhancing our Air Policing mission in the Baltic States, and AWACS surveillance flights over Poland and Romania... We will have more planes in the air, more ships on the water, and more readiness on the land. For example, air policing aircraft will fly more sorties over the Baltic region. Allied ships will deploy to the Baltic Sea, the Eastern Mediterranean and elsewhere, as required. Military staff from Allied nations will deploy to enhance our preparedness, training and exercises. Our defence plans will be reviewed and reinforced."

In June 2014, Rasmussen claimed that Russia "engaged actively with so-called non-governmental organisations – environmental organisations working against shale gas – to maintain European dependence on imported Russian gas", without providing evidence for this claim.

== Greenland crisis ==
In response to the Greenland crisis in 2026, Rasmussen said the U.S. actions are widely seen as a betrayal in Denmark. Rasmussen emphasized that Greenland is not for sale, that Greenlanders don't want to become part of the U.S. and that the only way for the U.S. to take it would be to invade the Kingdom of Denmark and destroy NATO. He said Denmark has no other choice than to defend its territory, and that non-resistance is not an option. He further said that Trump is "the biggest threat to world peace." He also suggested the establishment of a "European NATO" without the U.S.

== Organizations ==
=== Rasmussen Global ===
On 1 October 2014 as Rasmussen was succeeded by Jens Stoltenberg, the former Prime Minister of Norway, he declared the launch of the political consultancy Rasmussen Global to provide support on issues regarding security policy, Transatlantic relations, the European Union, Brexit and Economic development. Furthermore, in 2016 he published a book called 'The Will to Lead', giving his view that the USA should 'restore America's role as a global leader'

On 27 May 2016 Rasmussen became non-staff advisor to President Poroshenko of Ukraine. Rasmussen also convened the Friends of Ukraine group of sitting and former senior politicians and diplomats to raise international awareness of Ukraine and to keep domestic reform on the agenda.

On 2 April 2020 global bank Citi announced Rasmussen would join as a senior advisor in Citi's European, Middle East and Africa business, with a primary focus on the Nordic region.

In June 2022, Anders Fogh Rasmussen was asked by Ukrainian President Volodymyr Zelenskyy to co-chair an international working group on security guarantees together with Andriy Yermak, the head of the Office of the President of Ukraine. The resulting Kyiv Security Compact became the foundation of a G7 joint declaration on security guarantees co-signed by NATO allies at the 2023 NATO Summit in Vilnius. At the 2024 NATO Summit in Washington, the individual agreements negotiated between Ukraine and NATO allies were formalized in the Ukraine Compact.

=== Alliance of Democracies Foundation ===
In 2017 Rasmussen founded the Alliance of Democracies Foundation a non-profit organisation dedicated to the advancement of democracy and free markets across the globe. Its initiatives include the Copenhagen Democracy Summit, an annual conference bringing together political and business leaders, including current and former heads of government, from the world's democracies. The first summit in 2018 was addressed by Joe Biden and other speakers have included Tony Blair, Mike Pompeo and John Kerry.

The Foundation also hosts the Transatlantic Commission on Election Integrity, which 'helps advance solutions to protect integrity of democratic elections.' The commission was founded by Rasmussen, Former US Homeland Security Secretary Michael Chertoff and Joe Biden.

== Honours and decorations ==
- Commander of the Order of Dannebrog (Denmark, 7 April 2001)
- Commander 1st Class of the Order of Dannebrog (Denmark, 2002)
- Grand Cross of the Order of Dannebrog (Denmark, 7 April 2009)
- Medal of Merit in Gold (Denmark, 17 December 2002)
- Grand Cross of the Order of the Southern Cross (Brazil, 2009)
- Knight 1st class of the Order of the Balkan Mountains, awarded by the President of Bulgaria (11 April 2014)
- St. George Medal, 1st Class, awarded by the Defence Minister of Bulgaria (11 April 2014)
- Knight of the Order of the Cross of Terra Mariana (Estonia, 4 February 2009)
- Grand cross of the Order of Merit of the Federal Republic of Germany (Germany, 2002)
- Knight Grand Cross in the Order of Orange-Nassau (Netherlands, 30 January 2014)
- Grand Cross of the Order of Ruben Darío (Nicaragua, 2003)
- Grand Cross of the Order of Pedro Joaquín Chamorro (Nicaragua)
- Grand Officer of the Order of the Three Stars (Latvia, 16 April 2004)
- Grand Cross of the Order of the Grand Duke Gediminas (Lithuania, 21 April 2004)
- Grand Cross of the Order of the Oak Crown (Luxembourg, 2003)
- Grand Cross of the Order of Merit of the Republic of Poland (Poland, 2003)
- Grand cross of the Order of Merit (Portugal, 1992)
- Grand Cross of the Order of the Star of Romania (Romania, 2004)
- Grand Cross of the Order of the Polar Star (Sweden, 2007)
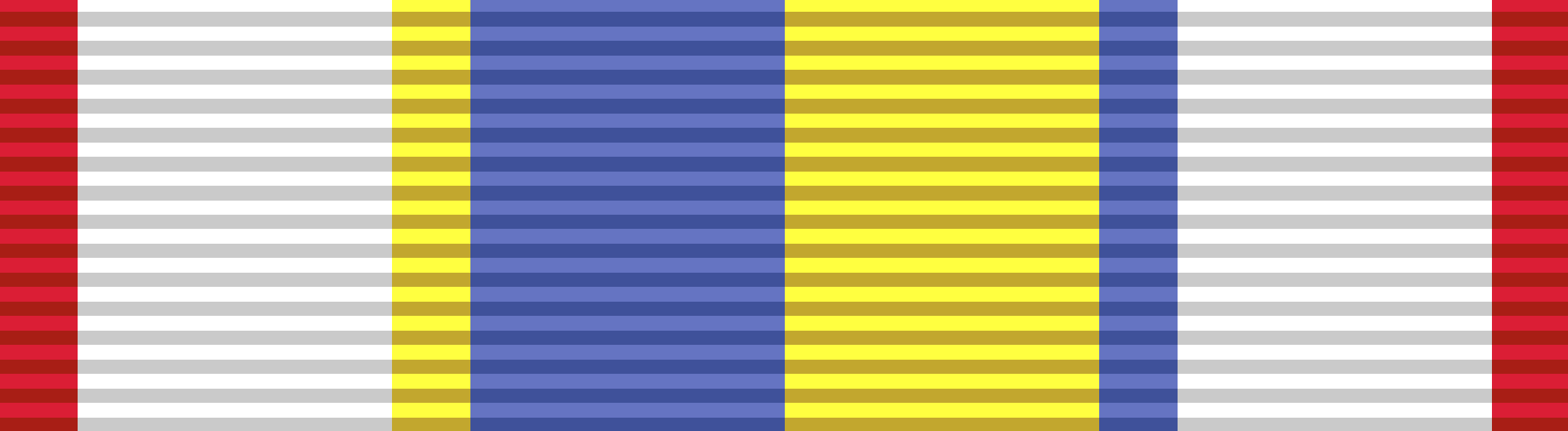
- Order of Liberty, awarded by the President of Ukraine, 7 August 2014 "For his significant contribution to the development of cooperation between the Ukrainian state and the Atlantic Alliance and the strong support in defending the sovereignty, independence and territorial integrity of Ukraine"
- Honorary Knight Commander of the Order of St Michael and St George (United Kingdom, 30 November 2015)
- Doctor Honoris Causa title by the University of Bucharest on 24 May 2013, for his work in Denmark, in Europe and at NATO.

== Bibliography ==
- Opgør med skattesystemet – der straffer de aktive og belønner de passive, Liberal, 1979; ISBN 87-7519-045-1
- Fra socialstat til minimalstat: en liberal strategi, Samleren, 1993; ISBN 87-568-1204-3

== Filmography ==
- Fogh bag facaden, 58 min., Danish documentary, by Christoffer Guldbrandsen, 2003,
- Den hemmelige krig, 58 min., Danish documentary, by Christoffer Guldbrandsen, 2006,
- AFR, 83 min., Danish mockumentary, by Morten Hartz Kaplers, 2007, AFR
- CIA's danske forbindelse, by Mette Aaby, 2008,

== See also ==
- Cabinet of Anders Fogh Rasmussen I
- Cabinet of Anders Fogh Rasmussen II
- Cabinet of Anders Fogh Rasmussen III
- List of prime ministers of Denmark
- Politics of Denmark

Political offices
| Preceded by Isi Foighel | Minister of Tax; 1987–1992 | Succeeded by Peter Brixtofte |
| Preceded by Niels Helveg Petersen | Minister of Economic Affairs; 1990–1992 | Succeeded by Thor Pedersen |
| Preceded by Poul Nyrup Rasmussen | Prime Minister of Denmark; 2001–2009 | Succeeded by Lars Løkke Rasmussen |
Party political offices
| Preceded by Uffe Ellemann-Jensen | Leader of Venstre; 1998–2009 | Succeeded by Lars Løkke Rasmussen |
Diplomatic posts
| Preceded by Jaap de Hoop Scheffer | Secretary General of NATO; 2009–2014 | Succeeded by Jens Stoltenberg |
