= Birgitta Ed =

Swedish entrepreneur and priest

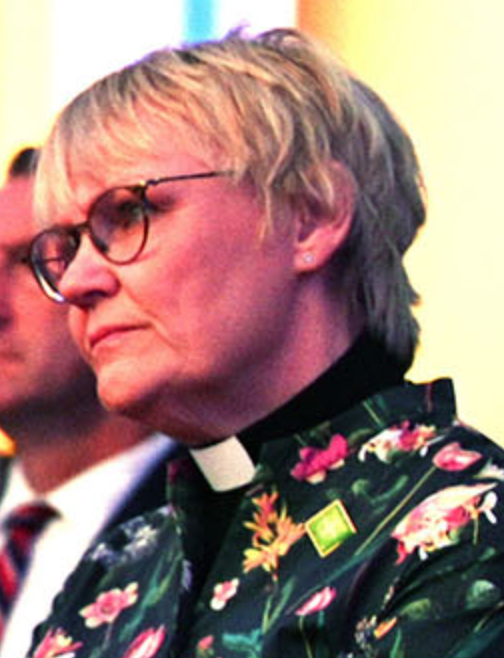
- Ed in 2024

Spouse of the Prime Minister of Sweden
- Assumed role 18 October 2022
- Monarch: Carl XVI Gustaf
- Prime Minister: Ulf Kristersson
- Preceded by: Richard Friberg
- Priest
- Church: Strängnäs Cathedral
- Diocese: Diocese of Strängnäs

Orders
- Ordination: 22 January 2023 by Johan Dalman

Personal details
- Born: Birgitta Paulina Ed; 2 September 1968 (age 58) Strängnäs, Sweden
- Denomination: Church of Sweden
- Spouse: Ulf Kristersson (m. 1991)
- Children: 3
- Profession: Entrepreneur, priest
- Education: Uppsala University; University College Stockholm

Birgitta Paulina Kristersson Ed (née Ed; 2 September 1968) is a Swedish priest in the Church of Sweden and a former entrepreneur and public relations consultant. She is married to Ulf Kristersson, who has been the Prime Minister of Sweden since 2022.

== Career ==
Ed worked as a political advisor in the government office (Ministry of Foreign Affairs and Ministry of Sweden) from 1991 to 1994, during Prime Minister Carl Bildt's tenure in office. In 1994, Ed co-founded the PR agency Sagt:Gjort, which through a merger in 2000 became the PR agency Springtime, where Ed was CEO from 2000–2001. Ed was CEO of Stiftelsen Sverige i Europa, leading the yes side during the 2003 Swedish euro referendum campaign.

Ed was involved, along with her agency Springtime, in the Swedish exhibition at the World Expo 2010 in Shanghai from 2009 to 2010. She later co-founded a business development agency Six Year Plan AB, where she was a senior adviser and co-owner.

=== Clergy career ===
In 2018, she began studying theology at the University College Stockholm with the aim of becoming a priest. She was ordained a priest on 22 January 2023 for the Diocese of Strängnäs in the Church of Sweden by bishop Johan Dalman in Strängnäs Cathedral.

== Controversies ==
=== Residence modifications and expenditures (2022 - 2026) ===
Following her relocation to the official residences at Sagerska Palace in Stockholm and the Harpsund country estate, Ed directed multiple interior and structural modifications through the national property board, Statens fastighetsverk. Internal correspondence reviewed by media outlets showed that her design requests incurred high procurement and consultant fees. For example, a 675 SEK bread paddle ultimately cost taxpayers 2,363 SEK after architectural consultation billing, while a 7,400 SEK kitchen rug generated a final cost of 27,400 SEK due to 19 hours of specialised consultant billing.

Ed also faced public scrutiny over the installation of private amenities at public expense. In April 2023, she requested a chicken coop at Harpsund that cost taxpayers 16,691 SEK. Following media exposure in May 2026, the prime minister's office announced the family would personally reimburse the state for the full amount. Additionally, media audits reported that a further 653,000 SEK of government funds were spent on gym renovations at both residences, including a 487,000 SEK upgrade at Harpsund for training equipment and a mirror wall. The couple was also criticised in media reports for hosting private events at the state-owned properties, such as a student party for her daughter at Harpsund in 2025.

=== Teach for Sweden grant allocation (2026) ===
In May 2026, a conflict of interest controversy emerged involving Ed's sister, Marita Bildt, who serves as a board member for the educational charity Teach for Sweden. An investigation reported that state aid to the organisation more than doubled after Bildt joined the board in 2021. On 9 April 2026, the prime minister, Ulf Kristersson, participated in a government cabinet meeting that reallocated 5 million SEK from the state integration and equality budget directly to the charity, drawing criticism from legal experts and opposition politicians regarding familial conflicts of interest.

=== Clergy appointment (2023) ===
In October 2023, Ed was appointed to a priest position at Strängnäs Cathedral. While the national Church of Sweden typically mandates public advertisements for vacant ministry roles to ensure transparent recruitment, a Dagens Nyheter newspaper investigation revealed this vacancy was handled without public notice. Parish leadership finalised the specific job criteria one day before Ed applied, and she was hired two weeks later as the sole applicant. The appointment drew criticism for institutional nepotism due to Ed's prior professional connections with the approving official, Bishop Johan Dalman, through shared local foundation boards.

=== Sagerska Palace event hosting (2025) ===
In October 2025, Ed used her position as vice chairperson of Europaskolan, a privately managed and publicly funded independent school (friskola), to co-sign a dinner hosted at Sagerska Palace, the Swedish Prime Minister's Stockholm residence. Legal and anti-corruption experts criticised the use of the official residence for private institutional networking. Amid political opposition and media reports, the school cancelled the booking in November 2025 and relocated the event to a commercial venue.

=== Fållöknastiftelsen and volunteer labour (2026) ===
In June 2026, an Aftonbladet newspaper investigation exposed financial and labour discrepancies regarding Fållöknastiftelsen, a health non-profit foundation co-founded by Ed. Ed and her husband Ulf Kristersson purchased the Vängården Fållökna Manor for 11 million SEK and leased it to the foundation, from which Ed personally billed 22,000 SEK monthly for development while relying on uncompensated volunteer labour to renovate the property. Ed was also accused of using her ecclesiastical connections to secure donations and free IT support for the foundation.

Volunteers were incentivised with political and business networking opportunities, and several foundation events were hosted inside Sagerska Palace. The investigation revealed that two foundation volunteers subsequently received public appointments within months of working at the estate, including one appointed as a secretary at the Government Offices and another, Martin Valfridsson, appointed as Director-General of the National Board of Institutional Care (Statens institutionsstyrelse).

Additionally, security concerns were raised when an undercover reporter successfully joined the volunteer crew, met Ed and her husband, and gained access to the couple's private bedroom in the without a background check by the Swedish Security Service (Säpo).

Following the reports in June 2026, the Strängnäs diocese disciplinary body (domkapitel) launched an official inquiry into Ed's professional suitability as a priest, which carries potential sanctions, ranging from a written reprimand, to expulsion from the clergy.

== Personal life ==
She has been married to Ulf Kristersson since 1991, and they have three adopted daughters from China. Her sister Marita Bildt is the sister-in-law of former Swedish Prime Minister Carl Bildt.

Honorary titles
Preceded by Richard Friberg	Spouse of the Prime Minister of Sweden; 2022–present	Current holder
