= Uppland Runic Inscription 158 =

The Uppland Runic Inscription 158 is a lost Viking Age runestone engraved in Old Norse with the Younger Futhark runic alphabet. It was located in Löttinge, in Täby Municipality.

== Inscription ==
[kalukʀ lit × risa × stn × þina × iftʀ × siba · boanta sin × koes...--... faþur · s¶in han fal · s... ¶ keþfrekr]
<kalukʀ> let {} ræisa {} stæin {} þenna {} æftiʀ {} Sibba, {} boanda sinn {} ... faður {} sinn. Hann fioll {} s[unnarla](?) {} ...
"<kalukʀ> had this stone raised in memory of Sibbi, her husbandman ... her father. He fell south(?) ... "

== See also ==
- List of runestones
