= Näsbypark =

District in Täby Municipality, Sweden

Coordinates: 59.4288°N 18.0813°E

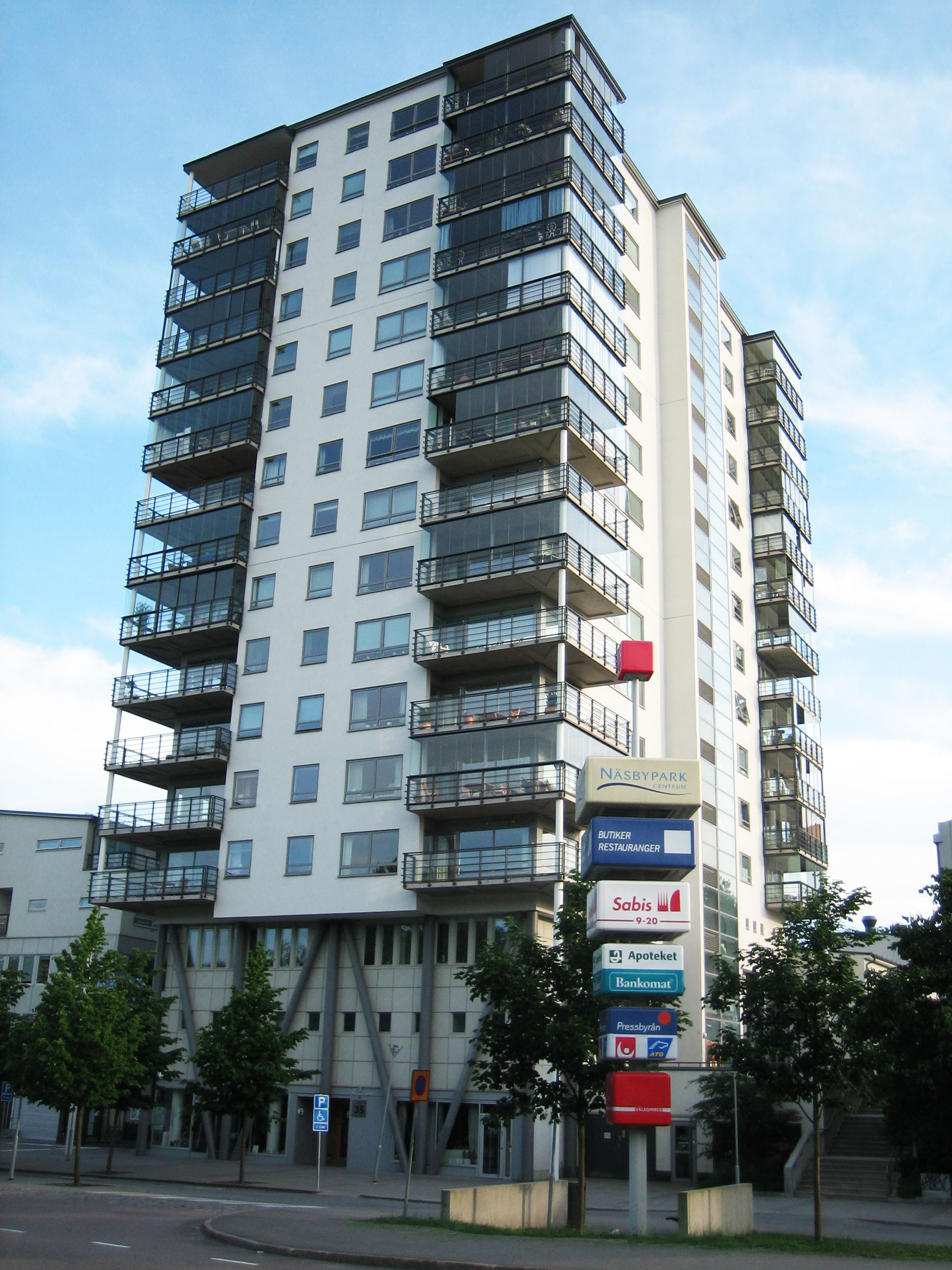
Central Näsbypark

Näsbypark is a district in Täby Municipality, north of Stockholm, Sweden.

== Geography ==
Näsbypark is located in the extreme southeastern part of the municipality next to Stora Värtan, an inlet of the Baltic Sea. It is bordered to the north by the neighbourhood of Viggbyholm and to the west by the neighbourhoods of Roslags Näsby and Näsbydal, which are separated from Näsbypark by the E18 motorway. To the south, Näsbypark is bordered by the neighbourhood of Lahäll, with the Sågtorpsvägen road generally defined as the border between the two.

== History ==
The name Näsbypark derives from the former park at Näsby Manor, which was designed by Nicodemus Tessin the Elder. The manor was totally demolished by a fire in 1897 and was rebuilt in 1902 by Carl Robert Lamm. Today, Näsby manor is a conference center.

The neighbourhood is characterized by detached houses mainly built between 1940-1970.

== Transportation ==
Näsbypark station is the terminal station of line 29 on the narrow-gauge Roslagsbanan railway, 11.8 km from Östra Station in central Stockholm. Roslagsbanan also stops at Näsby Allé station (11 km from Östra Station in Central Stockholm) in southern Näsbypark. Connections to central Stockholm are either by the E18 motorway or the Roslagsbanan train service.

== Notable residents ==
The previous Prime Minister of Sweden, Fredrik Reinfeldt, grew up in Näsbypark and he lived there with his wife, Filippa Reinfeldt, prior to moving to the Prime Minister's mansion in central Stockholm.
