= Ella Park =

Urban area in Täby Municipality, Sweden

Coordinates: 59°26′56″N 18°2′19″E

Ella Park is a neighbourhood in the central part of Täby Municipality, north of Stockholm.

It is dominated by single-family houses built mainly during the period between 1960 and 1970.
