= Richard Friberg =

Swedish economist (born 1967)

- Friberg in 2019

Spouse of the Prime Minister of Sweden
- In role 30 November 2021 – 18 October 2022
- Monarch: Carl XVI Gustaf
- Prime Minister: Magdalena Andersson
- Preceded by: Ulla Löfven
- Succeeded by: Birgitta Ed

Personal details
- Born: 5 May 1967 (age 59)
- Spouse: Magdalena Andersson (m. 1997)
- Children: 2
- Education: Stockholm School of Economics
- Website: richardfriberg.se
- Scientific career
- Fields: Economics
- Workplaces: Stockholm School of Economics
- Thesis: Prices, profits and exchange rate uncertainty (1997)
- Doctoral advisor: Robert Feenstra

Richard Friberg (born 5 May 1967) is a Swedish economist specializing in industrial organization, international trade, and risk management. He is the Jacob Wallenberg professor of economics at the Stockholm School of Economics.

== Education ==
Friberg completed a MSc. in Business and Economics (1992) and Ph.D. (1997) at the Stockholm School of Economics (SSE). His dissertation was titled Prices, profits and exchange rate uncertainty. Friberg's doctoral advisor was Robert Feenstra. He was a Fulbright scholar from August 1994 to June 1995 at the Massachusetts Institute of Technology. He was a postdoctoral researcher at the SSE from 1998 to 2000.

== Career ==
Friberg is an economist specializing in industrial organization, international trade, and risk management. He became an assistant professor at SSE in 2000. Friberg became an associate professor (docent) in 2001 and a full professor in 2008. He was selected as the Jacob Wallenberg professor of economics in 2009.

From 2009 to 2013, Friberg was editor of The Scandinavian Journal of Economics.

== Personal life ==
Since 1997 Friberg has been married to Magdalena Andersson, the prime minister of Sweden from 2021 to 2022; they have two children. He and his wife are avid outdoors people; they often go hiking, kayaking and mountaineering.

== Selected works ==
- Friberg, Richard (1999). Exchange Rates and the Firm: Strategies to Manage Exposure and the Impact of EMU. Palgrave Macmillan UK. ISBN 978-0-333-74551-9.
- Friberg, Richard (2015). Managing Risk and Uncertainty: A Strategic Approach. MIT Press. ISBN 978-0-262-52819-1.

Honorary titles
Preceded by Ulla Löfven	Spouse of the Prime Minister of Sweden; 2021–2022	Succeeded by Birgitta Ed
