= List of spouses of prime ministers of Sweden =

Spouse of the prime minister of Sweden
- Statsministerns gemål
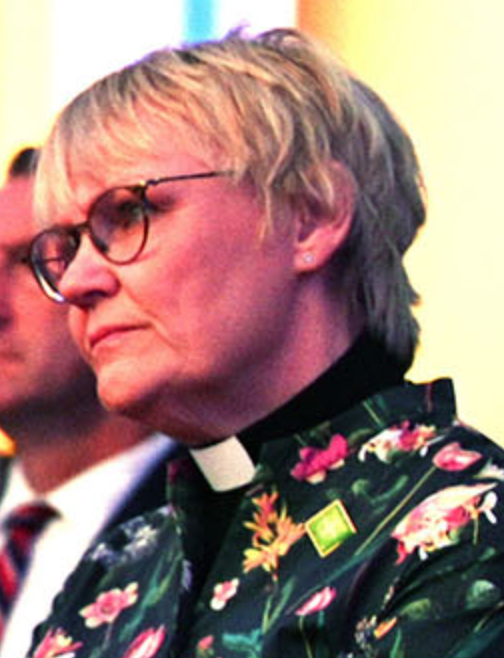
- Incumbent; Birgitta Ed since 18 October 2022
- Residence: Sager House
- Term length: While married to the incumbent Prime Minister.
- Inaugural holder: Caroline Wachtmeister

This is a list of spouses of the prime minister of Sweden. The spouse of the prime minister of Sweden is not an official office, although they play a spouse role during official visits. The current prime minister, Ulf Kristersson, is married to Birgitta Ed since 1991.

== United Kingdom of Sweden and Norway (1876–1905) ==
Name	Relation to Prime Minister	Duration
Caroline Wachtmeister (1826–1910)	wife of Louis Gerhard De Geer	1876–1880
Amalia De la Gardie (1821–1883)	wife of Arvid Posse	1880–1883
Charlotta Melart	wife of Carl Johan Thyselius	1883–1884
Frida Dahlberg	wife of Robert Themptander	1884–1888
Lucile Rosalie Dufva	wife of Gillis Bildt	1888–1889
Ulrika Gyldenstolpe	wife of Gustaf Åkerhielm	1889–1891
Carolina Boström	wife of Erik Gustaf Boström	1891–1900
Matilda von Otter	wife of Fredrik von Otter	1900–1902
Carolina Boström	wife of Erik Gustaf Boström	1902–1905
Henrika Charlotta Torén	wife of Johan Ramstedt	1905
Anna Elfbrink	wife of Christian Lundeberg	1905

== Kingdom of Sweden (1905–present) ==
Spouses marked in bold represents the Prime Minister's spouse while in office.

Prime Minister	In office	Spouse (born–dead)	Marriage years	Children
Karl Staaff	1905–1906			
Arvid Lindman	1906–1911; 1928–1930	**Annie Almström** (1867–1927)	1888–1927	Rolf Lindman
Arvid Lindman	1906–1911; 1928–1930	**Annie Almström** (1867–1927)	1888–1927	Eva Lindman
Arvid Lindman	1906–1911; 1928–1930	**Annie Almström** (1867–1927)	1888–1927	Karin Lindman
Karl Staaff	1911–1914			
Hjalmar Hammarskjöld	1914–1917	**Agnes Almqvist** (1866–1940)	1890–1940	Bo Hammarskjöld
Hjalmar Hammarskjöld	1914–1917	**Agnes Almqvist** (1866–1940)	1890–1940	Åke Hammarskjöld
Hjalmar Hammarskjöld	1914–1917	**Agnes Almqvist** (1866–1940)	1890–1940	Sten Hammarskjöld
Hjalmar Hammarskjöld	1914–1917	**Agnes Almqvist** (1866–1940)	1890–1940	Dag Hammarskjöld
Carl Swartz	1917	**Dagmar Lundström** (1867–1932)	1886–1926	Erik Swartz
Carl Swartz	1917	**Dagmar Lundström** (1867–1932)	1886–1926	Brita Swartz
Carl Swartz	1917	**Dagmar Lundström** (1867–1932)	1886–1926	Olof Swartz
Nils Edén	1917–1920	**Marja Wallmark** (1878–1959)	1904–1945	Lars Edén
Nils Edén	1917–1920	**Marja Wallmark** (1878–1959)	1904–1945	Brita Edén
Nils Edén	1917–1920	**Marja Wallmark** (1878–1959)	1904–1945	Per Olof Edén
Hjalmar Branting	1920; 1921–1923; 1924–1925	**Anna Jäderin** (1855–1950)	1884–1925	Georg Branting
Hjalmar Branting	1920; 1921–1923; 1924–1925	**Anna Jäderin** (1855–1950)	1884–1925	Sonja Branting
Gerhard Louis De Geer	1920–1921	**Magdalena Sörensen** (1861–1925)	1883–1925	Arvid De Geer
Gerhard Louis De Geer	1920–1921	**Magdalena Sörensen** (1861–1925)	1883–1925	Elisabet Magdalena De Geer
Gerhard Louis De Geer	1920–1921	**Magdalena Sörensen** (1861–1925)	1883–1925	Magnus De Geer
Gerhard Louis De Geer	1920–1921	**Magdalena Sörensen** (1861–1925)	1883–1925	Louise Adrienne De Geer
Gerhard Louis De Geer	1920–1921	**Magdalena Sörensen** (1861–1925)	1883–1925	Anna De Geer
Oscar von Sydow	1921	**Mary Wijk** (1884–1957)	1911–1936	Erik von Sydow
Oscar von Sydow	1921	**Mary Wijk** (1884–1957)	1911–1936	Kristian von Sydow
Oscar von Sydow	1921	**Mary Wijk** (1884–1957)	1911–1936	Marie von Sydow
Ernst Trygger	1923–1924	**Signe Söderström** (1867–1934)	1891–1934	Ulla Trygger
Ernst Trygger	1923–1924	**Signe Söderström** (1867–1934)	1891–1934	Carl Trygger
Ernst Trygger	1923–1924	**Signe Söderström** (1867–1934)	1891–1934	Nils Christian Trygger
Rickard Sandler	1925–1926	**Maria Lindberg** (1877–1971)	1909–1964	Björn Sandler
Rickard Sandler	1925–1926	**Maria Lindberg** (1877–1971)	1909–1964	Åke Sandler
Rickard Sandler	1925–1926	**Maria Lindberg** (1877–1971)	1909–1964	Germund Sandler
Carl Gustaf Ekman	1926–1928; 1930–1932	**Laura Widlund** (1879–1970)	1900–1945	Gertrud Ekman
Carl Gustaf Ekman	1926–1928; 1930–1932	**Laura Widlund** (1879–1970)	1900–1945	Ingrid Ekman
Carl Gustaf Ekman	1926–1928; 1930–1932	**Laura Widlund** (1879–1970)	1900–1945	Torsten Ekman
Carl Gustaf Ekman	1926–1928; 1930–1932	**Laura Widlund** (1879–1970)	1900–1945	Ragnar Ekman
Felix Hamrin	1932	**Elisabeth Pennycook**	1900–1937	Ruth Hamrin
Felix Hamrin	1932	**Elisabeth Pennycook**	1900–1937	Jessie Hamrin
Felix Hamrin	1932	**Elisabeth Pennycook**	1900–1937	Mac Hamrin
Per Albin Hansson	1932–1936; 1936–1946†	**Sigrid Vestdahl** (1886–1973)	1906–1918 (cohabitation); 1926–1946† (cohabitation)	Anna Lisa Vestdahl-Hansson
Per Albin Hansson	1932–1936; 1936–1946†	**Sigrid Vestdahl** (1886–1973)	1906–1918 (cohabitation); 1926–1946† (cohabitation)	Per Gunnar Vestdahl-Hansson
Per Albin Hansson	1932–1936; 1936–1946†	Elisabeth Fryckberg (1889–1969)	1918–1926	Elsa Brita Hansson
Per Albin Hansson	1932–1936; 1936–1946†	Elisabeth Fryckberg (1889–1969)	1918–1926	Karin Hansson
Axel Pehrsson-Bramstorp	1936	**Sigrid Nilsson** (1881–1951)	1908–1951	Inga Bramstorp
Axel Pehrsson-Bramstorp	1936	**Sigrid Nilsson** (1881–1951)	1908–1951	Folke Bramstorp
Axel Pehrsson-Bramstorp	1936	**Sigrid Nilsson** (1881–1951)	1908–1951	Rut Bramstorp
Axel Pehrsson-Bramstorp	1936	**Sigrid Nilsson** (1881–1951)	1908–1951	John Bramstorp
Tage Erlander	1946–1969	**Aina Andersson** (1902–1990)	1930–1985	Sven Erlander
Tage Erlander	1946–1969	**Aina Andersson** (1902–1990)	1930–1985	Bo Erlander
Olof Palme	1969–1976; 1982–1986†	Jelena Rennerova (1927– )	1949–1952	
Olof Palme	1969–1976; 1982–1986†	**Lisbeth Beck-Friis** (1931–2018)	1956–1986†	Joakim Palme
Olof Palme	1969–1976; 1982–1986†	**Lisbeth Beck-Friis** (1931–2018)	1956–1986†	Mårten Palme
Olof Palme	1969–1976; 1982–1986†	**Lisbeth Beck-Friis** (1931–2018)	1956–1986†	Mattias Palme
Thorbjörn Fälldin	1976–1978; 1979–1982	**Solveig Öberg** (1935– )	1956–2016	Eva Fälldin
Thorbjörn Fälldin	1976–1978; 1979–1982	**Solveig Öberg** (1935– )	1956–2016	Nicklas Fälldin
Thorbjörn Fälldin	1976–1978; 1979–1982	**Solveig Öberg** (1935– )	1956–2016	Pontus Fälldin
Ola Ullsten	1978–1979	**Evi Esko** (1931–1992)	1961–1981	Katarina Ullsten
Ola Ullsten	1978–1979	**Evi Esko** (1931–1992)	1961–1981	Maria Ullsten
Ola Ullsten	1978–1979	Louise Beaudoin (1954– )	1989–2018	Nicolas Beaudoin Ullsten
Ola Ullsten	1978–1979	Louise Beaudoin (1954– )	1989–2018	Christian Beaudoin Ullsten
Ingvar Carlsson	1986–1991; 1994–1996	**Ingrid Melander** (1934– )	1957–	Ingela Carlsson
Ingvar Carlsson	1986–1991; 1994–1996	**Ingrid Melander** (1934– )	1957–	Pia Carlsson
Carl Bildt	1991–1994	Kerstin Zetterberg (1947– )	1974–1975	
Carl Bildt	1991–1994	**Mia Bohman** (1953– )	1984–1997	Gunnel Bildt
Carl Bildt	1991–1994	**Mia Bohman** (1953– )	1984–1997	Nils Bildt
Carl Bildt	1991–1994	Anna Maria Corazza (1963– )	1998–	Gustaf Bildt
Göran Persson	1996–2006	Gunnel Claesson (1947–)	1978–1994	Anna Persson
Göran Persson	1996–2006	Gunnel Claesson (1947–)	1978–1994	Linnea Persson
Göran Persson	1996–2006	**Annika Andersson** (1951– )	1995–2003	
Göran Persson	1996–2006	**Anitra Steen** (1949– )	2003–	
Fredrik Reinfeldt	2006–2014	**Filippa Reinfeldt** (1967– )	1992–2013	Gustaf Reinfeldt
Fredrik Reinfeldt	2006–2014	**Filippa Reinfeldt** (1967– )	1992–2013	Erik Reinfeldt
Fredrik Reinfeldt	2006–2014	**Filippa Reinfeldt** (1967– )	1992–2013	Ebba Reinfeldt
Fredrik Reinfeldt	2006–2014	Roberta Alenius (1978– )	2015–2022 (cohabitation)	Alessia Alenius
Fredrik Reinfeldt	2006–2014	Anna Nordin (1980– )	2025–	
Stefan Löfvén	2014–2021	**Ulla Arvidsson** (1951– )	2003–	
Magdalena Andersson	2021–2022	**Richard Friberg** (1967– )	1997–	Björn Friberg
Magdalena Andersson	2021–2022	**Richard Friberg** (1967– )	1997–	Saga Friberg
Ulf Kristersson	2022–	**Birgitta Ed** (1968– )	1991–	Siri Ed Kristersson
Ulf Kristersson	2022–	**Birgitta Ed** (1968– )	1991–	Ellen Ed Kristersson
Ulf Kristersson	2022–	**Birgitta Ed** (1968– )	1991–	Signe Ed Kristersson

== See also ==
- Prime Minister of Sweden
- List of prime ministers of Sweden
