= Ulla Löfven =

Swedish politician and trade unionist (born 1951)

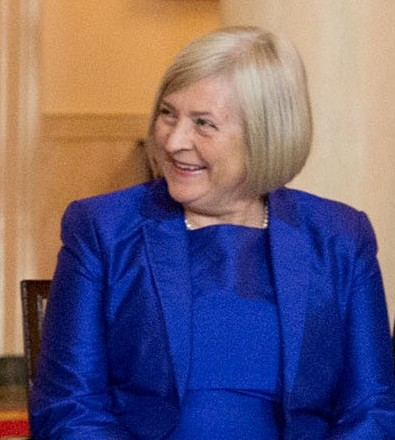
- Ulla Löfven in May 2016

Spouse of the Prime Minister of Sweden
- In role 3 October 2014 – 30 November 2021
- Monarch: Carl XVI Gustaf
- Prime Minister: Stefan Löfven
- Preceded by: Filippa Reinfeldt
- Succeeded by: Richard Friberg

Personal details
- Born: Ulla Margareta Arvidsson; 29 May 1951 (age 74) Stora Malm Parish, Södermanland, Sweden
- Party: Social Democrats
- Spouse(s): Sten Johansson (divorced) Stefan Löfven (m. 2003)
- Children: 2 (from her previous marriage)

Ulla Margareta Löfven (Swedish pronunciation: [ˈɵ̂lːa lœˈveːn]; also spelt Löfvén, née Arvidsson, previously Johansson; born 29 May 1951) is a Swedish politician and trade unionist. She is married to former Prime Minister Stefan Löfven, the former leader of the Social Democrats.

She was born on 29 May 1951 in Stora Malm Parish, Sôdermanland County, Sweden.

She first met Stefan Löfven when they both worked at Hägglunds & Söner in 1992; he worked as a welder and she was a representative for the local branch of a trade union. She was married and had two children when they met. They married in November 2003.

She was employed as the assistant of Carin Jämtin, the party secretary of the Social Democrats, until her husband was elected party leader in January 2012.

Honorary titles
Vacant Title last held by Filippa Reinfeldt	Spouse of the Prime Minister of Sweden; 2014–2021	Succeeded by Richard Friberg
