= Anitra Steen =

Swedish politician (born 1949)

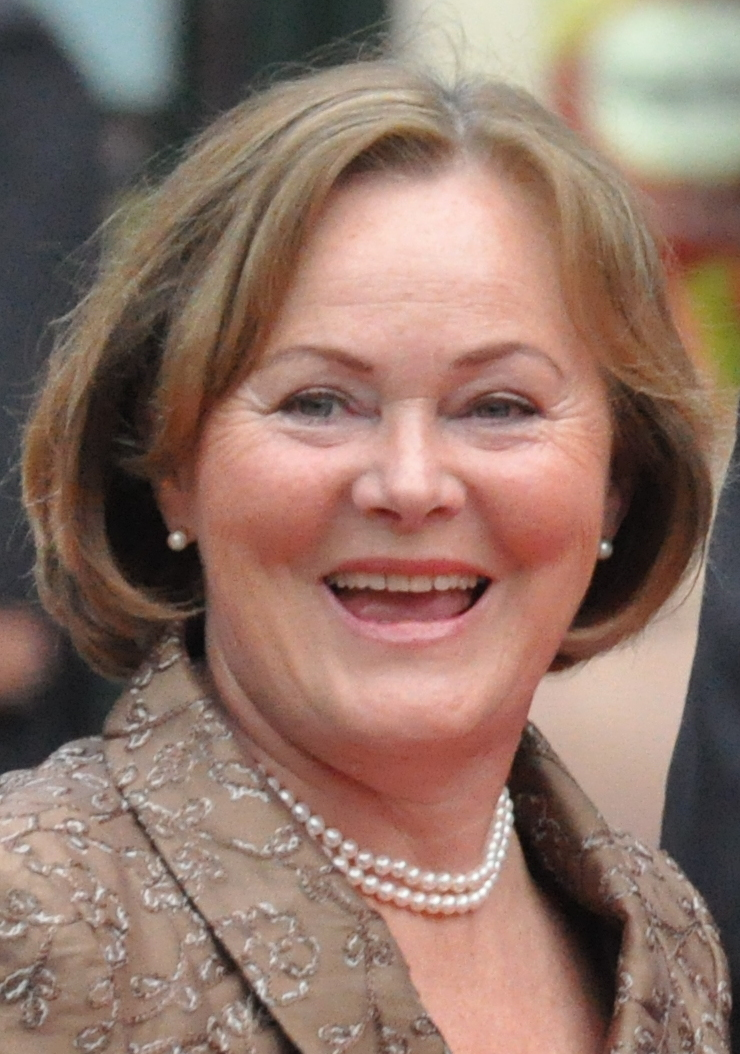
- Steen in 2010

Spouse of the Prime Minister of Sweden
- In role 6 December 2003 – 6 October 2006
- Prime Minister: Göran Persson
- Preceded by: Annika Barthine
- Succeeded by: Filippa Reinfeldt

Personal details
- Born: Anitra Linnéa Bergström; 13 May 1949 (age 77) Västanfors, Fagersta, Västmanland, Sweden
- Party: Social Democrats
- Spouse(s): Per Olof Steen (m. 1970, divorced) Göran Persson (m. 2003)
- Children: 2
- Education: Uppsala University (1971)

Anitra Linnéa Steen (née Bergström; on 13 May 1949) is a Swedish politician, civil servant who is the wife of former Prime Minister Göran Persson.

Steen held various governmental roles since 1989: state secretary for Persson-led Ministry of Education and then for the Ministry of Finance, as well as director-general of the Council for Higher Education and the Tax Agency. Between 1999 and May 2009, when she retired, she was the manager of Systembolaget, the Swedish state alcoholic beverage retailing monopoly. In that role she was forced to cope with a full blown corruption scandal, involving bribery of shop managers and senior staff by some major suppliers, including Vin & Sprit, formerly the producing and importing division of the Swedish state monopoly. Vin & Sprit is now owned by Pernod Ricard.

== Personal life ==
Steen was born in Västanfors, Fagersta, Västmanland. She graduated from Uppsala University in 1971.

In 1970, she married Per Olof Steen, with whom she has two children; the couple later divorced. Since 6 December 2003, she has been married to Göran Persson, former Prime Minister of Sweden. Because of her personal connection to the head of the Swedish government, her independence as a board member of Scandinavian Airlines, which is jointly owned by the Scandinavian governments, was put in question by some.

Civic offices
Preceded by	State secretary for the Swedish Ministry of Education; 1989–1991	Succeeded by
Preceded by	Director-general of the Swedish Council for Higher Education; 1992–1994	Succeeded by
Preceded by	State secretary for the Swedish Ministry of Finance; 1994–1995	Succeeded by
Preceded by Lennart Nilsson	Director-general of the Swedish Tax Agency; 1996–1999	Succeeded by Mats Sjöstrand
Business positions
Preceded by Gabriel Romanus	CEO of the Systembolaget; 1999–2009	Succeeded by Magdalena Gerger
