= Robert Feenstra =

American economist, academic and author

Robert Christopher Feenstra
- Born: 1956 (age 69–70)
- Title: Distinguished Professor Emeritus

Academic background
- Education: B.A. (1977); Ph.D. (1981)
- Alma mater: University of British Columbia; Massachusetts Institute of Technology
- Academic advisors: Walter Erwin Diewert; Jagdish Bhagwati; T. N. Srinivasan

Academic work
- Institutions: University of California, Davis; National Bureau of Economic Research

Robert Christopher Feenstra (born 1956) is an American economist, academic and author. He is a Distinguished Professor Emeritus in the Department of Economics at the University of California, Davis. He served as the director of the International Trade and Investment Program at the National Bureau of Economic Research from 1992 to 2016. He also served as Associate Dean in the Social Sciences at the University of California, Davis from 2014 to 2019.

Feenstra's research is focused on the theory and estimation of international trade models, including the measurement issues that arise in these topics. He is most known for his research on: measuring the gains from product variety; assessing the impact of offshoring; and the Penn World Table, a project jointly with the University of Groningen on measuring real GDP across different countries in dollar values. He has written over 100 published articles and six books.

Feenstra was awarded the Bernhard Harms Prize from the Kiel Institute for the World Economy at the University of Kiel in Germany in 2006. He has presented numerous invited lectures at universities around the world. In 2017, he was elected a fellow of the Econometric Society.

== Early life and education ==
Born in Vancouver, Canada, Feenstra was an undergraduate at the University of British Columbia, where he completed his B.A. Honors in Economics and was awarded the University Medal in Arts and Sciences in 1977. He then started graduate work at the Massachusetts Institute of Technology where he completed his Ph.D. in 1981. That year, he did a post-doctoral fellowship at the University of Chicago.

== Career ==
After completing his Ph.D. at the Massachusetts Institute of Technology, Feenstra taught for five years at the Columbia University. In 1986, he joined the University of California, Davis as an associate professor, becoming a professor in 1990 and a distinguished professor in 2007. In 2006, he was endowed the C. Bryan Cameron Distinguished Chair in International Economics.

Feenstra was the chair of Department of Economics at UC Davis from 1990 to 1995. From 2014 to 2017, he was appointed as the Associate Dean of Academic Affairs, Division of Social Sciences, and subsequently from 2017 to 2019 as the Associate Dean of the Faculty in the Social Sciences, College of Letters and Science at the University of California, Davis.

In 1992, Feenstra was appointed as the director of the International Trade and Investment program at the National Bureau of Economic Research (NBER). He headed the program until 2016. He remains a faculty research fellow at the NBER.

Feenstra has been an international research fellow and then associate of the Kiel Institute for World Economy since 2006. He was the co-editor of the Journal of International Economics from 1987 to 1990. He then served as the editor of the journal from 1995 to 2001. He has been the associate editor of The Review of Economics and Statistics, American Economic Review and American Economic Journal – Economic Policy.

== Research ==
Feenstra's research is focused on the theory and estimation of international trade models, including assessing the impact of trade policies and measurement issues that arise in these topics.

=== Variety gains from trade ===
Feenstra wrote the article "New Product Varieties and the Measurement of International Prices," published in the American Economic Review in 1994, which is one of his most widely cited articles. In the article, he discussed how the gains from product variety that arise in models of international trade with monopolistic competition can be measured. The research output is summarized in the book Product Variety and the Gains from International Trade, which was initially presented as the Zeuthen Lectures, University of Copenhagen, 2007;

=== Offshoring and wage inequality ===
Feenstra also wrote the article "Integration of Trade and Disintegration of Production in the Global Economy" published in 1998. In the article, he discussed different adaptions of offshoring as well as its global growth from the 1970s. In joint work with Gordon Hanson, they have discussed the employment and wage effects of offshoring, especially on workers with low skills. The research output is summarized in the book Offshoring in the Global Economy: Theory and Evidence, which was initially presented as the Ohlin Lectures, Stockholm School of Economics, 2008.

=== Contributions to the Penn World Table ===
Feenstra is also widely known for his work on the Pen World Table (PWT). Initiated by scholars from the University of Pennsylvania in the 1960s, Feenstra became involved with the Penn World Table in the early 2000s. This project creates "real GDP" across countries in dollar terms and attempts to answer the question: what is the value of the basket of goods purchased by the average consumer in each country when evaluated at U.S. prices? It has become the most downloaded dataset in economics.

In early 2010s, Feenstra took over the calculations of the PWT together with Robert Inklaar and Marcel Timmer at the University of Groningen. He wanted to introduce prices on international traded products, in addition to the prices for consumption and investment goods already collected. The PWT website went live at the University of Groningen in July 2013. Feenstra's work on PWT has been funded by two grants, one from National Science Foundation and the other from Sloan Foundation.

In 2015, Feenstra and his coauthors published the article "The Next Generation of the Penn World Table", which appeared in the American Economic Review. This article describes the changes introduced to PWT starting with version 8 in 2013, which expanded on previous versions in three respects. First, in addition to comparisons of living standards using components of real GDP on the expenditure side, they provide a measure of productive capacity, called real GDP on the output side. Second, growth rates are benchmarked to multiple years of cross-country price data so they are less sensitive to new benchmark data. Third, data on capital stocks and productivity are (re)introduced.

=== Prices and measurement ===
Feenstra is also engaged in several projects collecting prices for the measurement of real GDP. He has collaborated with Alberto Cavallo of the Billion Prices Project MIT, to obtain bar-code level prices for various countries that can be used to calculate real GDP. In the article "What is the Price of Tea in China?", Feenstra and co-authors collected prices at the bar-code level from grocery stores in China, using software that scraped these prices from a cell phone application. Since these cities vary greatly in size, they were able to test for a pro-competitive effect of city size on prices, and they confirmed that larger cities in China have lower prices for than in smaller cities. They attributed these lower prices in larger cities to greater entry of firms and retailers and more competition. They did not find this pro-competitive effect across cities in the United States, leading to the question of what account for the difference between the U.S. and China.

=== Theoretical considerations on variety gains and pro-competitive effects ===
Feenstra explored the question in theory in a paper entitled "Restoring the Product Variety and Pro-competitive Gains from Trade with Heterogeneous Firms and Bounded Productivity", where he started with a popular class of models used in international trade that does not give rise to a pro-competitive effect of city or country size on prices. He showed what mathematical assumptions in these models need to be modified in order to restore a pro-competitive effect. That paper drew on "Globalization, Markups, and U.S. Welfare”, joint with David Weinstein, where they was able to measure a pro-competitive effect of import competition on prices in the United States. In 2018, Feenstra was invited for a keynote lecture at the Econometric Society meeting. Entitled "The Pro-competitive Effects of Market Size," the address drew on the theoretical and empirical results from these publications.

=== Armington elasticity ===
In a 2018 paper, "In Search of the Armington Elasticity", Feenstra and co-authors address the long-standing issue in international trade of measuring the degree of substitution between goods imported from different countries, versus the degree of substitution between imported and domestically produced goods. They make use of a novel dataset to estimate both elasticities and assess the "rule of two", under which foreign goods are twice as substitutable for each other as they are for domestically produced goods. They confirm that result, though with confidence intervals that are not that tight.

=== The China trade shock ===
Feenstra has also conducted research on the impact of China's joining the WTO on its exports– the so-called China shock – and on employment in the United States and elsewhere. In 2019, he and coauthors published the article "U.S. Exports and Employment” in the Journal of International Economics, examining the job losses caused by U.S. imports from China and the job gains due to U.S. global exports.

== Awards and honors ==
- 2006 - Bernhard Harms Prize from the Kiel Institute for World Economics at the University of Kiel in Germany
- 2010 - 2013 - Herbert A. Young Society Dean's Fellowship at UC Davis
- 2007 - Global Economy Lecture, Vienna Institute for International Economics Studies
- 2007 - Zeuthen Lectures, University of Copenhagen
- 2008 - Nottingham Lectures in International Economics, University of Nottingham
- 2008 - Ohlin Lectures, Stockholm School of Economics
- 2011 - Open Economy Lectures, University of International Business and Economics
- 2011 - Yanfu Memorial Lecture, Peking University
- 2014 - Frank D. Graham Memorial Lecture, Princeton University

== Publications ==
=== Books ===
- International Trade Price Indexes and Seasonal Commodities. U.S. Dept. of Labor, Bureau of Labor Statistics, Washington, D.C., 1999, with William Alterman and W. Erwin Diewert.
- Advanced International Trade: Theory and Evidence. Princeton University Press, 2004 and 2015.
- Emergent Economics, Divergent Paths: Economic Organization and International Trade in South Korea and Taiwan, Cambridge University Press, 2006, with Gary G. Hamilton.
- Product Variety and the Gains from International Trade. MIT Press, 2010. Presented as the Zeuthen Lectures, University of Copenhagen, 2007.
- International Economics. Worth Publishers, 2008, 2011, 2014, 2017 and 2021, with Alan M. Taylor.
- Offshoring in the Global Economy: Theory and Evidence. MIT Press, 2010. Presented as the Ohlin Lectures, University of Stockholm, 2008.

=== Selected articles ===
- Feenstra, R. C. "Functional Equivalence between Liquidity Costs and the Utility of Money." Journal of Monetary Economics, 1986, 17(2): 271–291.
- Feenstra, R. C. "Symmetric Pass-through of Tariffs and Exchange Rates under Imperfect Competition: An Empirical Test." Journal of International Economics, 1989, 27(1–2):25–45.
- Feenstra, R. C., and James R. Markusen. "Accounting for Growth with New Inputs." International Economic Review, 1994, 35(2): 429–447.
- Feenstra, R. C. "New Product Varieties and the Measurement of International Prices." American Economic Review, 1994, 84(1): 157–177.
- Feenstra, R. C. and Gordon H Hanson. "Foreign Direct Investment and Relative Wages: Evidence from Mexico’s Maquiladoras." Journal of International Economics, 1997, 42(3–4): 371–393.
- Feenstra, R. C. "Integration of Trade and Disintegration of Production in the Global Economy." Journal of Economic Perspectives, 1998, 31–50.
- Feenstra, R. C., and G. H. Hanson. "The Impact of Outsourcing and High-Technology Capital on Wages: Estimates For the United States, 1979-1990." Quarterly Journal of Economics, 1999, 114(3): 907–940.
- Feenstra, R. C., B. Mandel, M. B. Reinsdorf, and M. J. Slaughter. "Effects of Terms of Trade Gains and Tariff Changes on the Measurement of U.S. Productivity Growth." American Economic Journal: Economic Policy, 2013, 5(1): 59–93.
- Feenstra, R. C. and J. Romalis. "International Prices and Endogenous Quality." Quarterly Journal of Economics, 2014, 129(2): 477–528.
- Feenstra, R. C., R. Inklaar and M. Timmer, "The Next Generation of the Penn World Table." American Economic Review, 2015, 105(10): 3150–3182.
- Feenstra, R. C. and D. Weinstein, "Globalization, Markups, and U.S. Welfare." Journal of Political Economy, 2017, 125(4): 1041–1074.
- Feenstra, R. C., P. Luck, M. Obstfeld and K. Russ, "In Search of the Armington Elasticity." Review of Economics and Statistics, 2018, 100(1): 135–150.
