= Filippa Reinfeldt =

Swedish politician

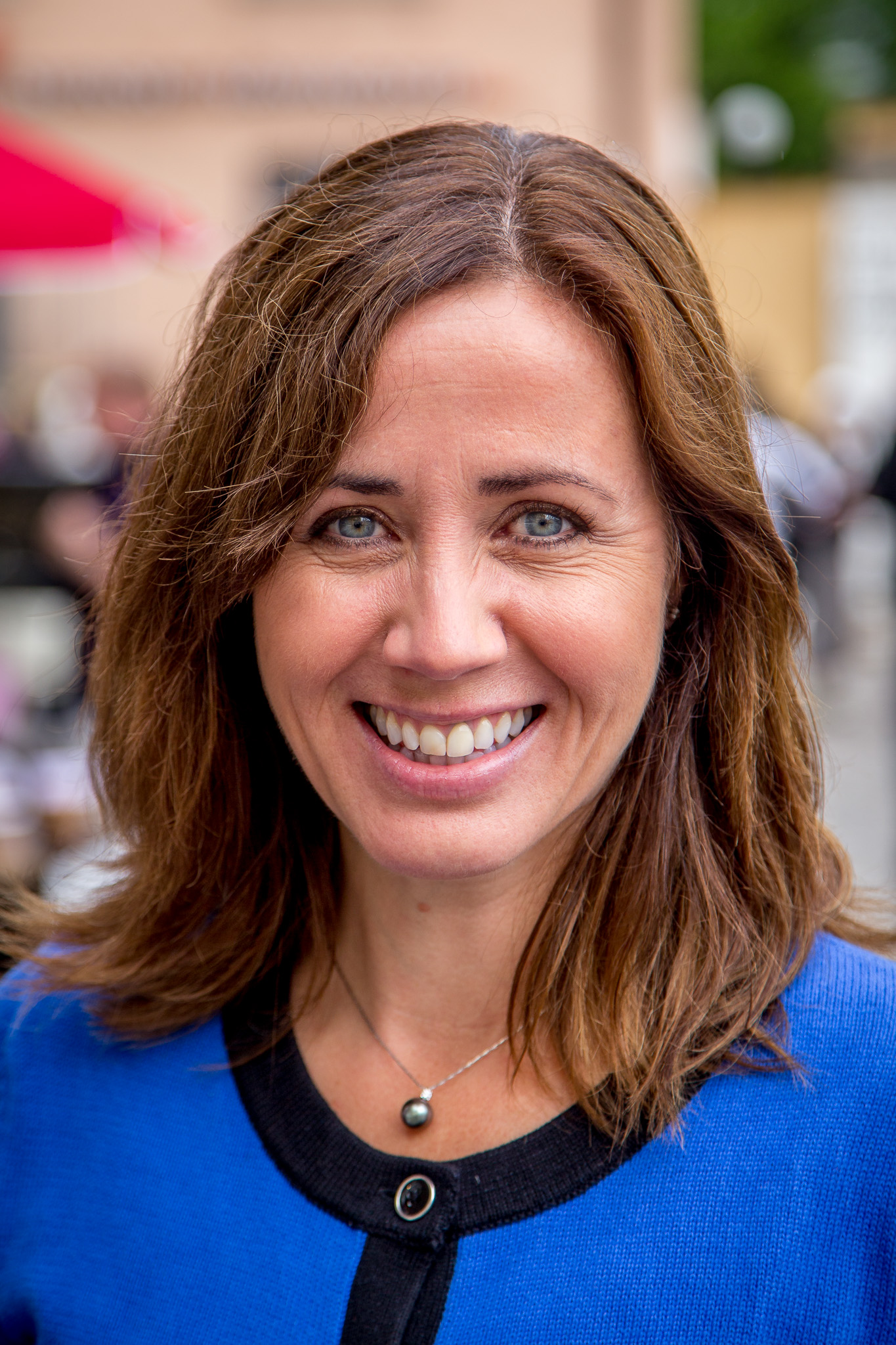
- Filippa Reinfeldt in July 2014

Health Service Commissioner of Stockholm County
- In office 2006–2014
- Preceded by: Inger Ros
- Succeeded by: Anna Starbrink

Spouse of the Prime Minister of Sweden
- In role 6 October 2006 – 20 February 2013
- Prime Minister: Fredrik Reinfeldt
- Preceded by: Anitra Steen
- Succeeded by: Ulla Löfvén

Personal details
- Born: Filippa Désirée Amanda Cay Holmberg; 14 June 1967 (age 59) Skeppsholmen, Stockholm, Sweden
- Party: Moderate Party
- Spouse: Fredrik Reinfeldt (m. 1992; div. 2013)
- Children: 3

Filippa Désirée Amanda Cay Reinfeldt (née Holmberg; 14 June 1967) is a Swedish politician of the Moderate Party. She served as Health Service Commissioner of Stockholm County from 2006 to 2014, with responsibility for health care, social affairs and hospitals. She was previously mayor of Täby Municipality from 2005 to 2006. In July 2019, she was appointed the Moderate Party's spokesperson on LGBT-issues.

She was married to former Prime Minister Fredrik Reinfeldt from 1992 until their divorce in 2013.

== Early life ==
Filippa Holmberg was born on 14 June 1967, the daughter of Senior Captain Cay Holmberg and his wife, Ulla Molin. The parents divorced, and she grew up with her mother in Ålsten. She became a member of the Moderate Youth League (MUF) at the age of 13 and then pursued a humanistic-aesthetic program at Bromma gymnasium until 1986. After graduation, she was recruited to Timbro by Gunnar Hökmark. In 1989, she was recruited to the central MUF and participated in one of the largest recruitment projects in the organization's history: 200,000 first-time voters were called before the 1991 Swedish general election. In 1990, she was elected to the MUF board. Later, she was elected chairman of the Moderate Youth League in Solna Municipality.

== Career ==
Reinfeldt was Municipal Commissioner (Swedish: kommunalråd) of Täby, Uppland, from 2002 and Mayor and Chairperson (Mayor) of the Täby Municipal Executive from 2005 until 2006. Reinfeldt was appointed to several posts (förtroendevald) in the Stockholm City Council from 1991 to 1994 and councillor in the Stockholm County Council from 1994.

Filippa Reinfeldt's position as a politician was used by the Swedish Social Democratic Party to criticise Fredrik Reinfeldt during the 2006 Swedish general election. Following the 2006 general election, Filippa Reinfeldt was re-elected as a Mayor in Täby with the Moderate Party alone gaining over 50% of the votes in the Täby municipal election. She resigned shortly afterwards in order to become County Commissioner of Health Services in the administration of Chris Heister.

On 16 October 2014, she challenged incumbent Finance Commissioner Torbjörn Rosdahl following the 2014 general election but lost, with the votes 20 for her against 22 for Rosdahl. She subsequently announced that she will retire from politics.

On 19 December 2014, Dagens Industri revealed that Reinfeldt would become a partner of privately owned health care company Aleris, responsible for business development and public affairs by February 2015.

== Personal life ==
Filippa Reinfeldt met her future husband Fredrik Reinfeldt in 1989 when the two presided at the Moderate Youth League. They married in 1992 in Skeppsholmskyrkan and later moved to Täby. On 7 March 2012, the couple announced their separation. On 11 July, the couple signed their divorce application (customarily pending for six months). On 20 February 2013, they signed the last papers that finalised their divorce. They have three children.

Political offices
Preceded by Stefan Klåvus	Mayor of Täby; 2005–2006	Succeeded by Leif Gripestam
Preceded by Inger Ros	Health Service Commissioner of Stockholm County; 2006–2014	Succeeded by Anna Starbrink
Honorary titles
Preceded by Anitra Steen	Spouse of the Prime Minister of Sweden; 2006–2013	Vacant Title next held by Ulla Löfvén
