= Strängnäs Cathedral =

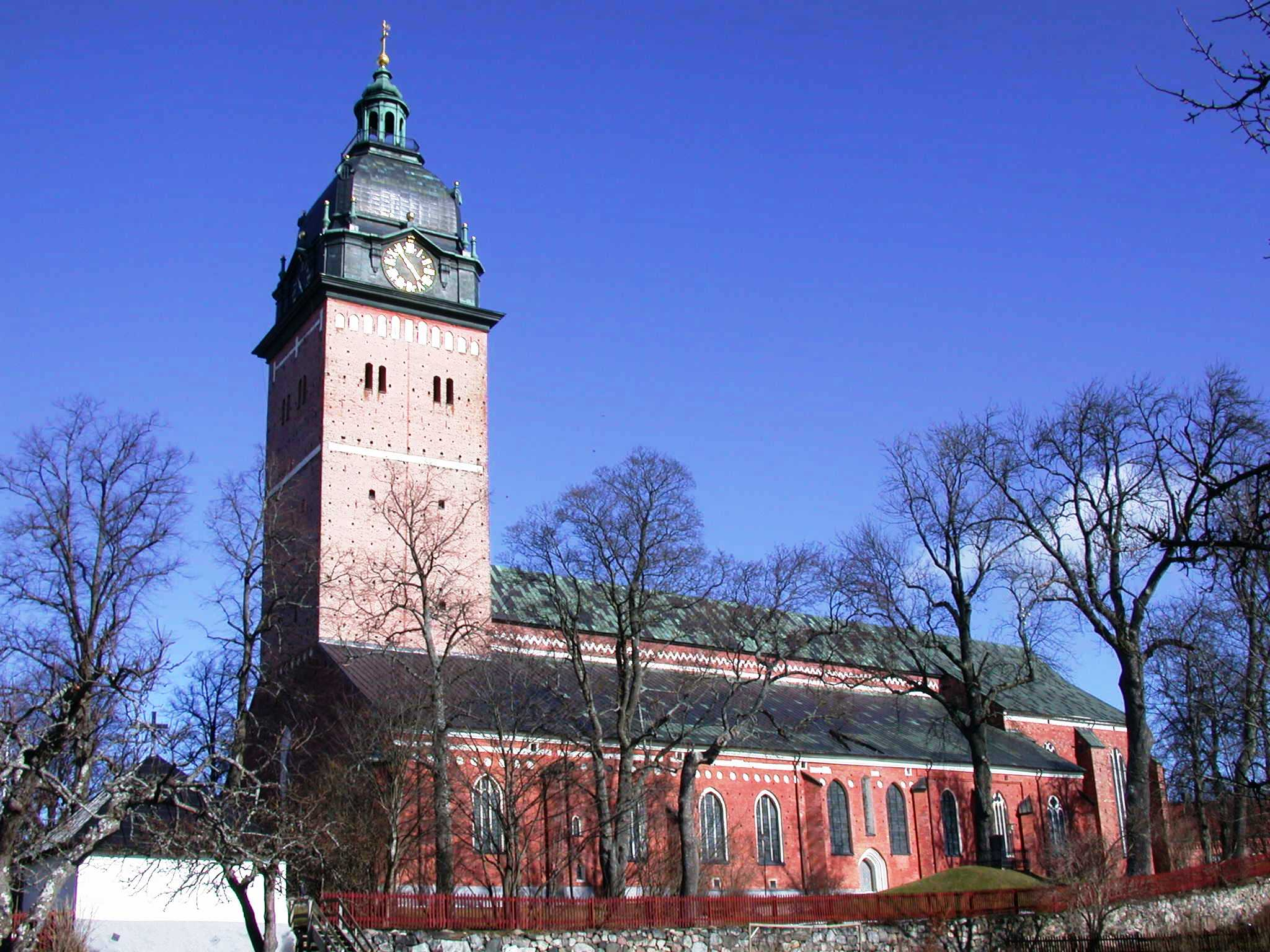
- Strängnäs Cathedral

- Location within Södermanland Location within Sweden
- 59°22′32.16″N 17°02′04.56″E
- Location: Strängnäs
- Country: Sweden
- Denomination: Church of Sweden
- Previous denomination: Roman Catholic

History
- Status: Cathedral
- Founded: 1260
- Dedication: St Peter & St Paul
- Consecrated: 1291

Architecture
- Functional status: Active
- Style: Gothic

Administration
- Diocese: Strängnäs

Clergy
- Bishop: Johan Dalman

Strängnäs Cathedral (Swedish: Strängnäs domkyrka) is a Lutheran cathedral church in Strängnäs, Sweden, since the Protestant Reformation the seat of the Church of Sweden Diocese of Strängnäs.

== Architecture ==
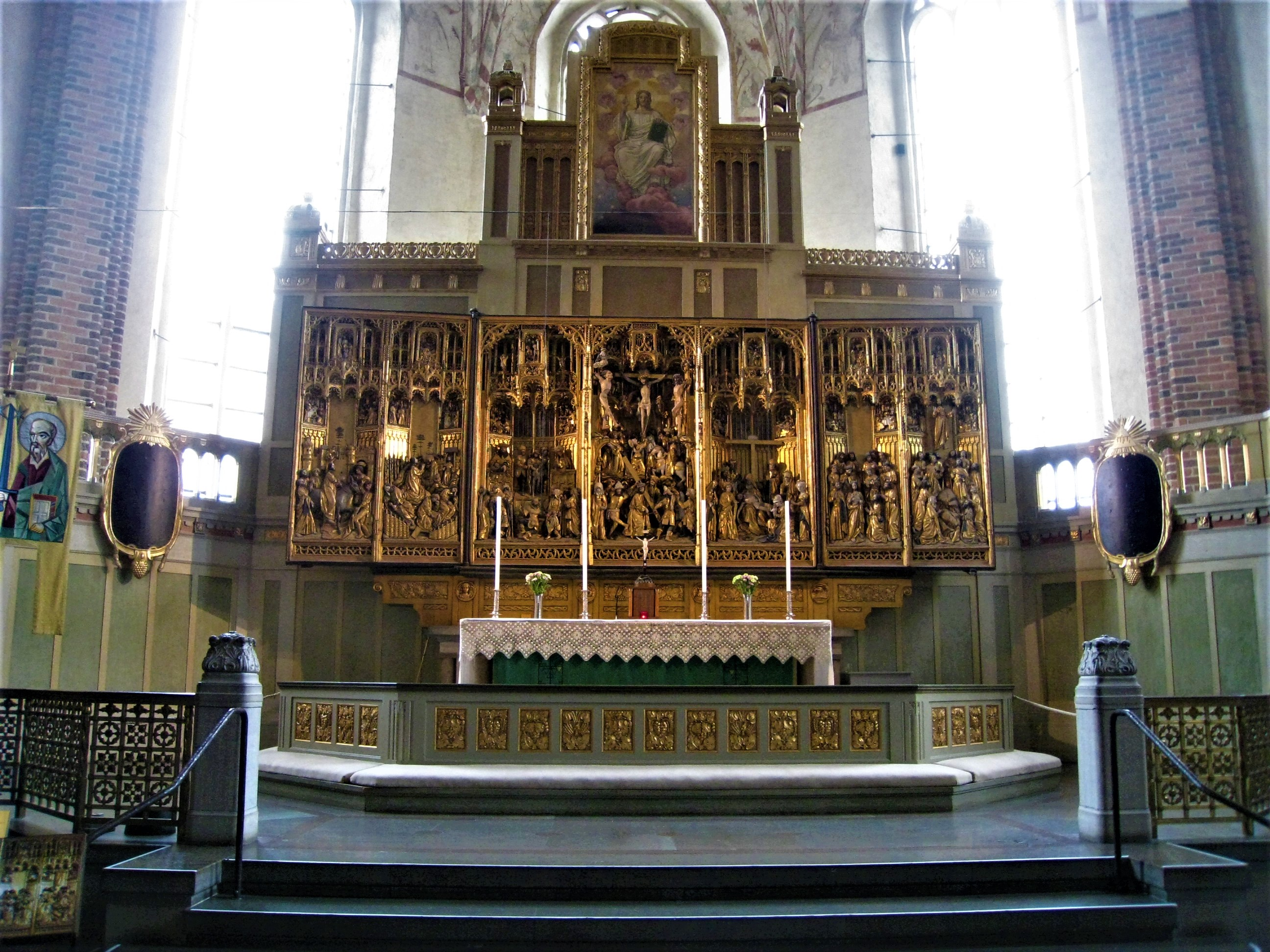
The high altar of Strängnäs Cathedral, showing detail of the sanctuary, and the very large carved and gilded triptych reredos.

Construction of the cathedral began in about 1260 with inaugurated in 1291; additions were created during the 1300s and 1400s. In 1330 the core church itself was completed and it was later supplemented during the Middle Ages with a sacristy, towers and lateral choirs. The present characteristic Baroque-style tower hood was built in 1723.

It is built mainly of bricks in the characteristic Scandinavian Brick Gothic style. The original church was built of wood, probably during the first decades of the 12th century, on a spot where pagan rituals used to take place and where the missionary Saint Eskil was killed during the mid 11th century. The wooden church was not rebuilt in stone and bricks until 1240, just after Strängnäs became a diocese.

The cathedral contains a mixture of decorative styles. The nave, chancel, and sanctuary are highly traditional, with a very large triptych reredos dominating the high altar at the east end of the building. However, two of the side chapels have been refurbished in highly contemporary style, with modern altars, and abstract artistic decoration and religious symbolism.

== Prominent burials ==
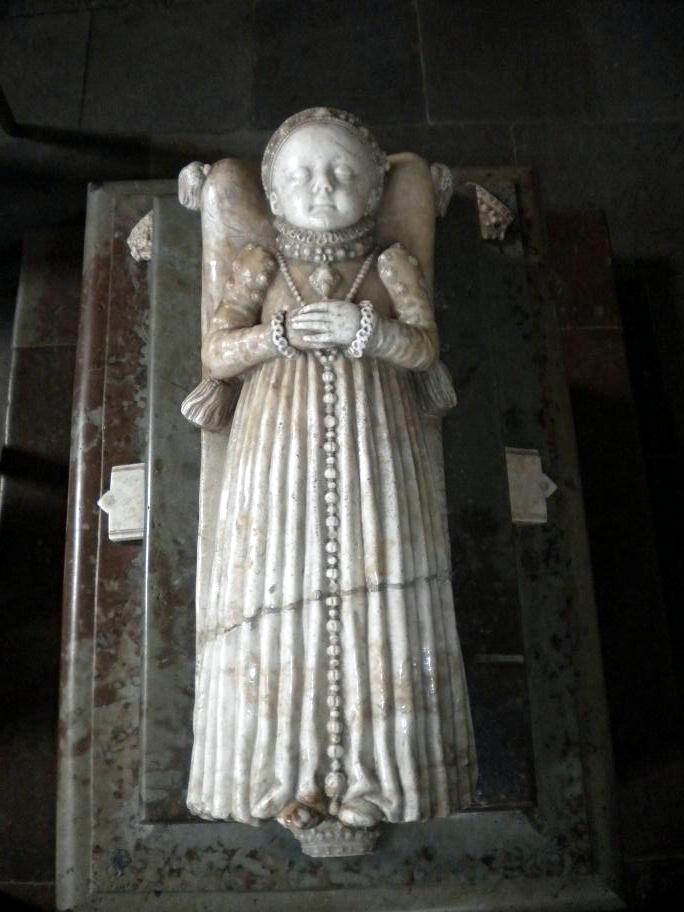
Grave monument of Princess Isabella of Sweden in Strängnäs Cathedral

The cathedral contains the tombs of Charles IX of Sweden, Sten Sture the Elder, Maria of Palatinate-Simmern and Gustaf Otto Stenbock. On 31 July 2018, the burial regalia (two crowns and an orb) of Charles IX and Christina of Holstein-Gottorp were stolen in a daylight robbery with the thieves escaping by boat. In February 2019 it was reported that the regalia had been found and a man was facing trial accused of the theft.

== Strängnäs Cathedral Library ==
Strängnäs Cathedral Library is one of the oldest surviving and working libraries in Sweden. It dates its origin to the year 1316 when Strängnäs Dominican monastery (according to a record kept by a will) received a widow's donation of books. The library was then built consciously by the bishops Kort Rogge and John Matthiæ. During the 1600s, it was expanded by Christina, Queen of Sweden, through the addition of the spoils of war, especially from the cities of Prague, Olmutz and Nikolsburg. During the 1700s the library expanded through gifts and bequests from learned diocesan clergy. During the 1800s it was kept in the former school building's main hall, and is now in the special Library chancel in the cathedral's northwestern corner. Dr Henrik Aminson (1814–1885) published in 1863 a comprehensive printed directory Bibliotheca Templi Cathedralis Stregnensis, quae maximam partem ex Germania Capta est circa finem belli triginta annorum, descripta, 1-2, of over 600 pages. Most of the printed books are listed in Libris, the Swedish libraries search service. A printed catalogue in two volumes was published in 2017 (Ragnhild Lundgren, Strängnäs domkyrkobibliotek. Systematisk katalog över tryckta böcker).

== Gallery ==
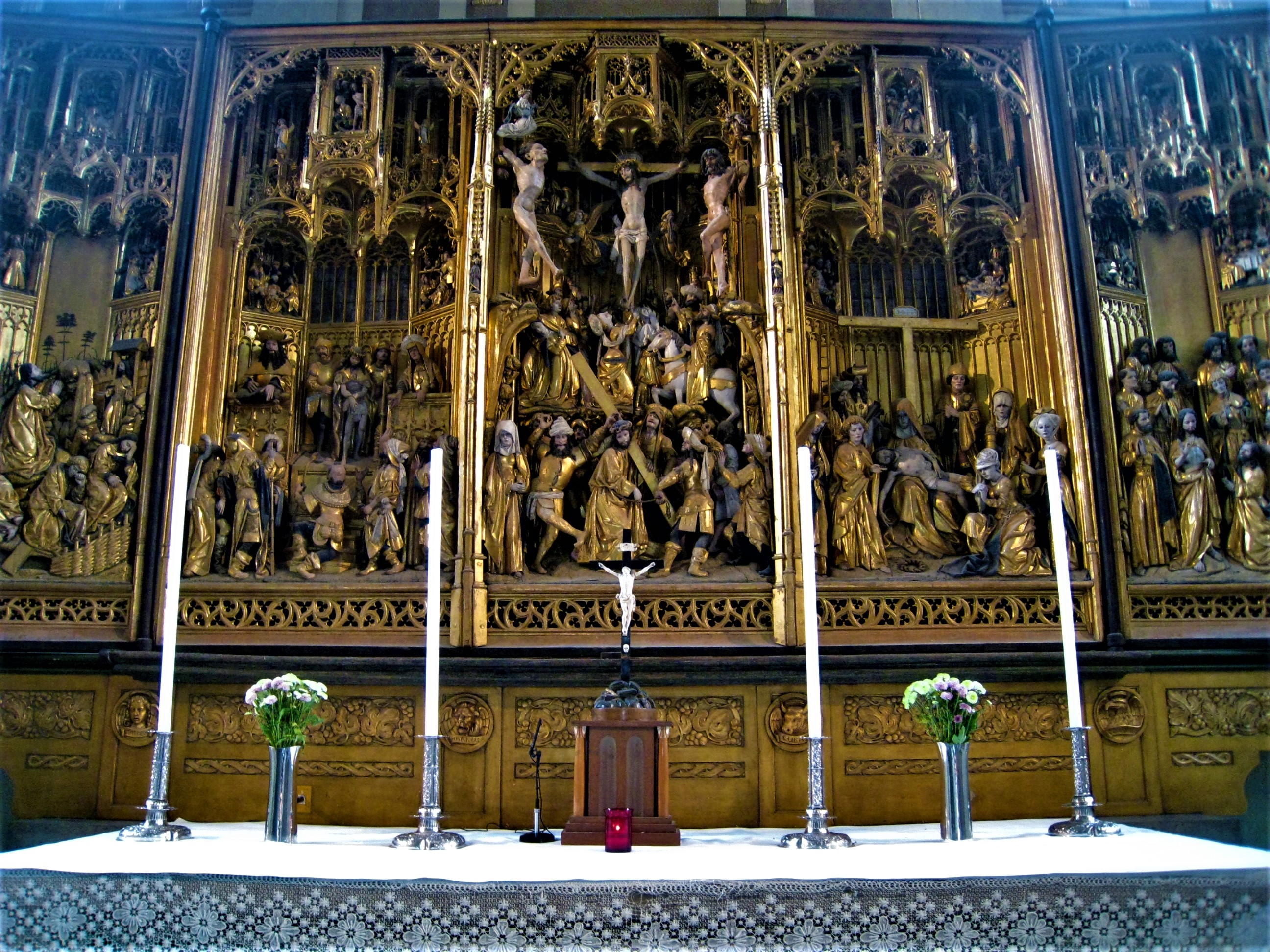
Altar

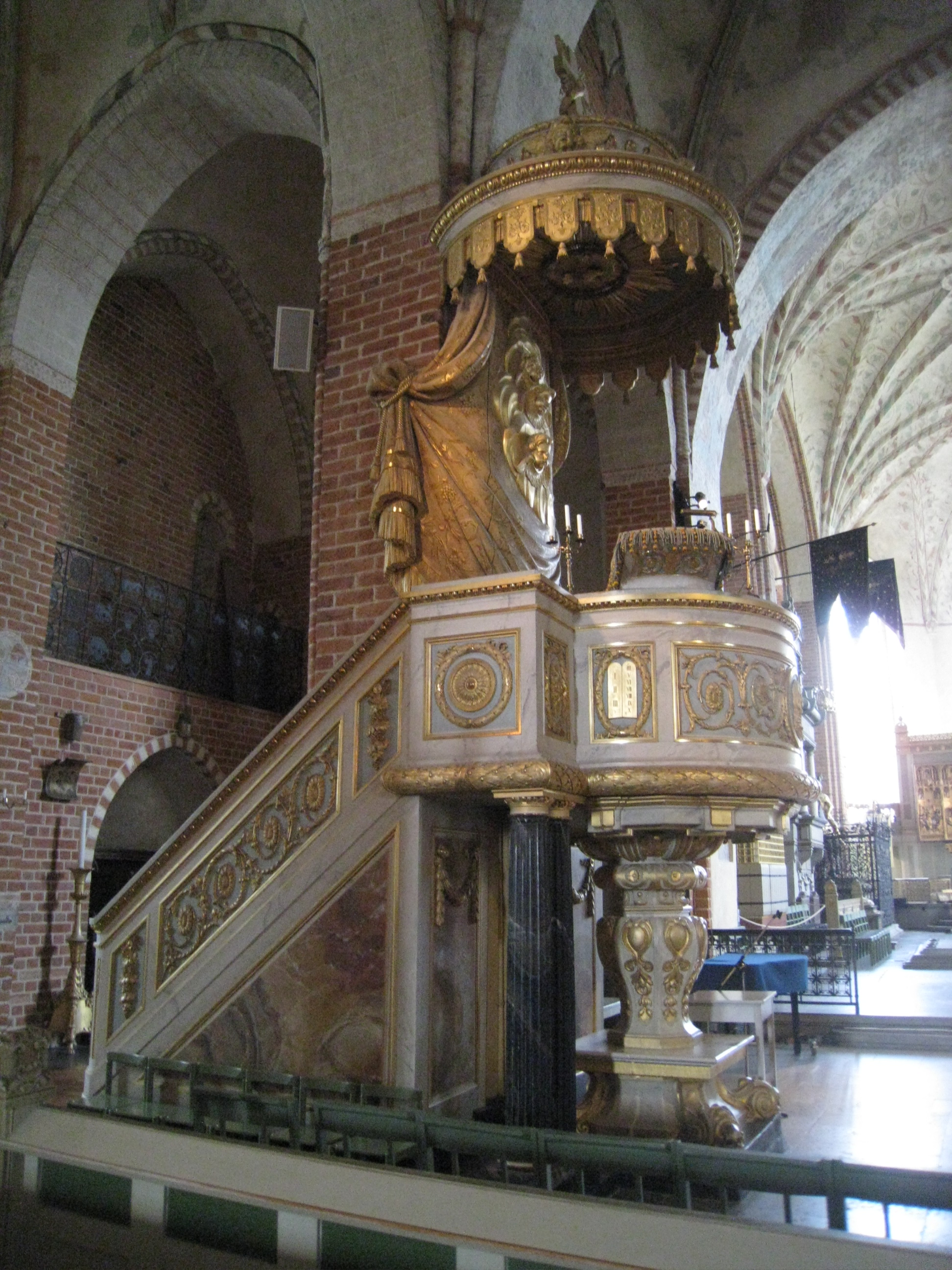
Pulpit

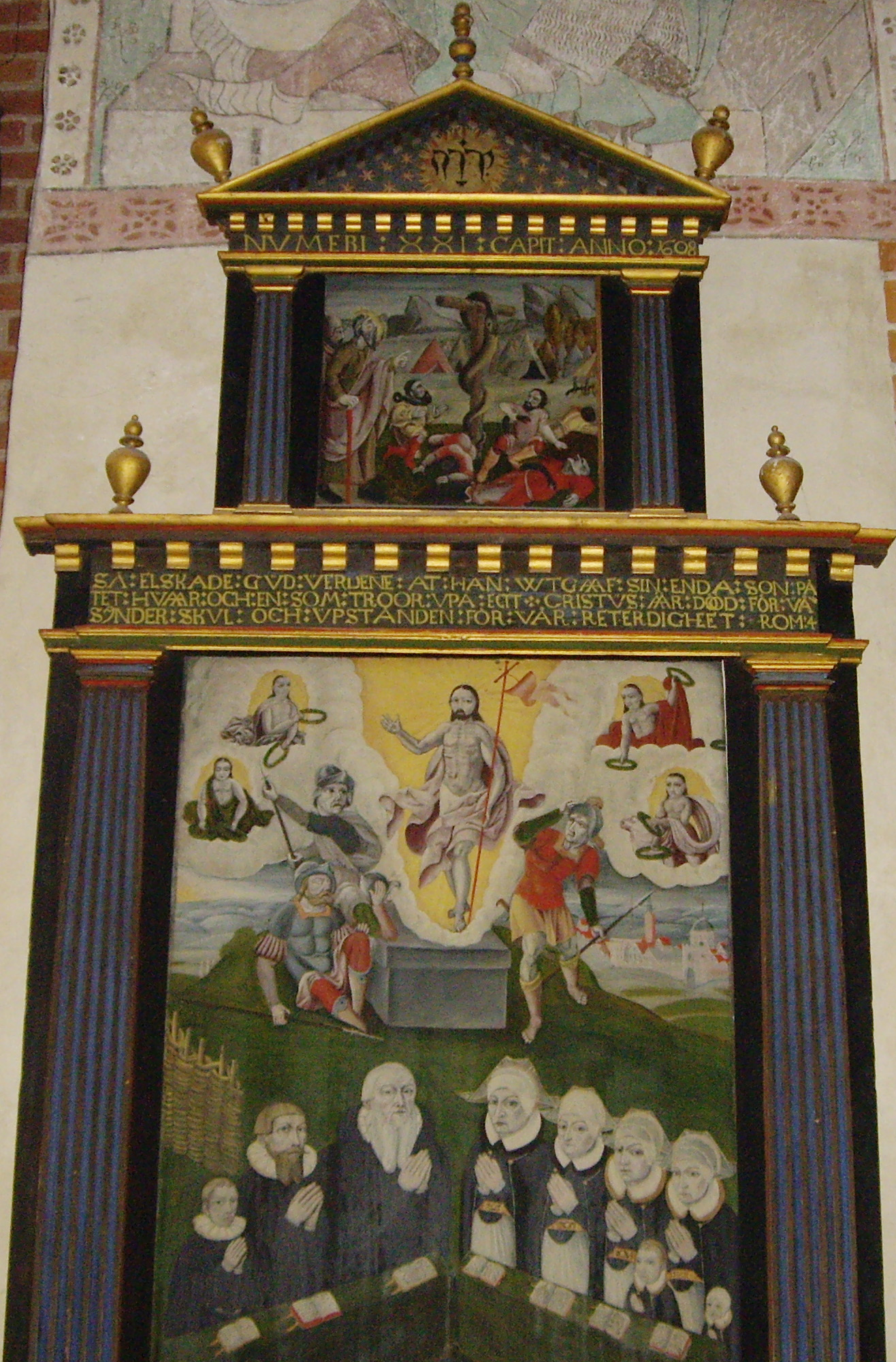
Epitaph

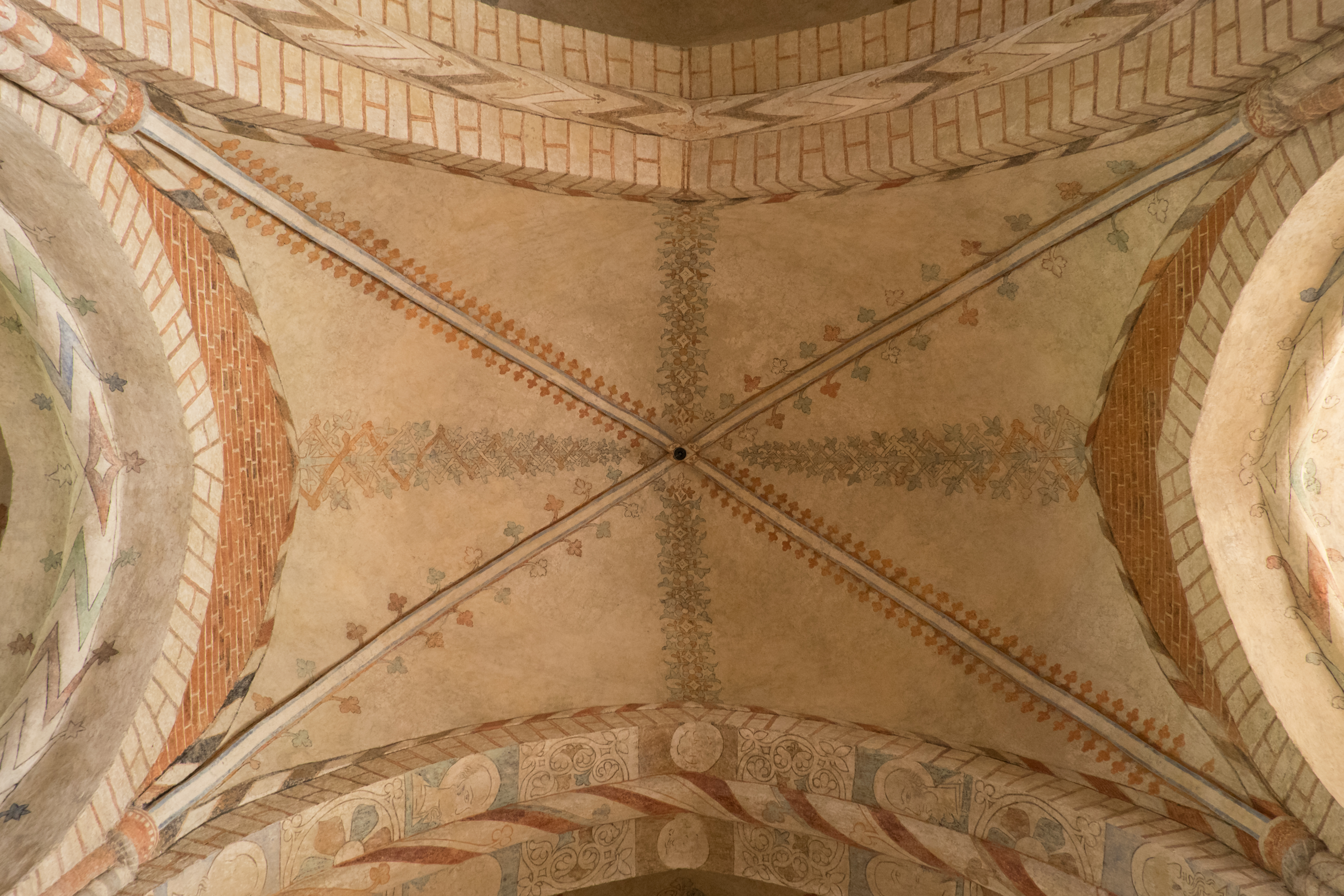
Ceiling

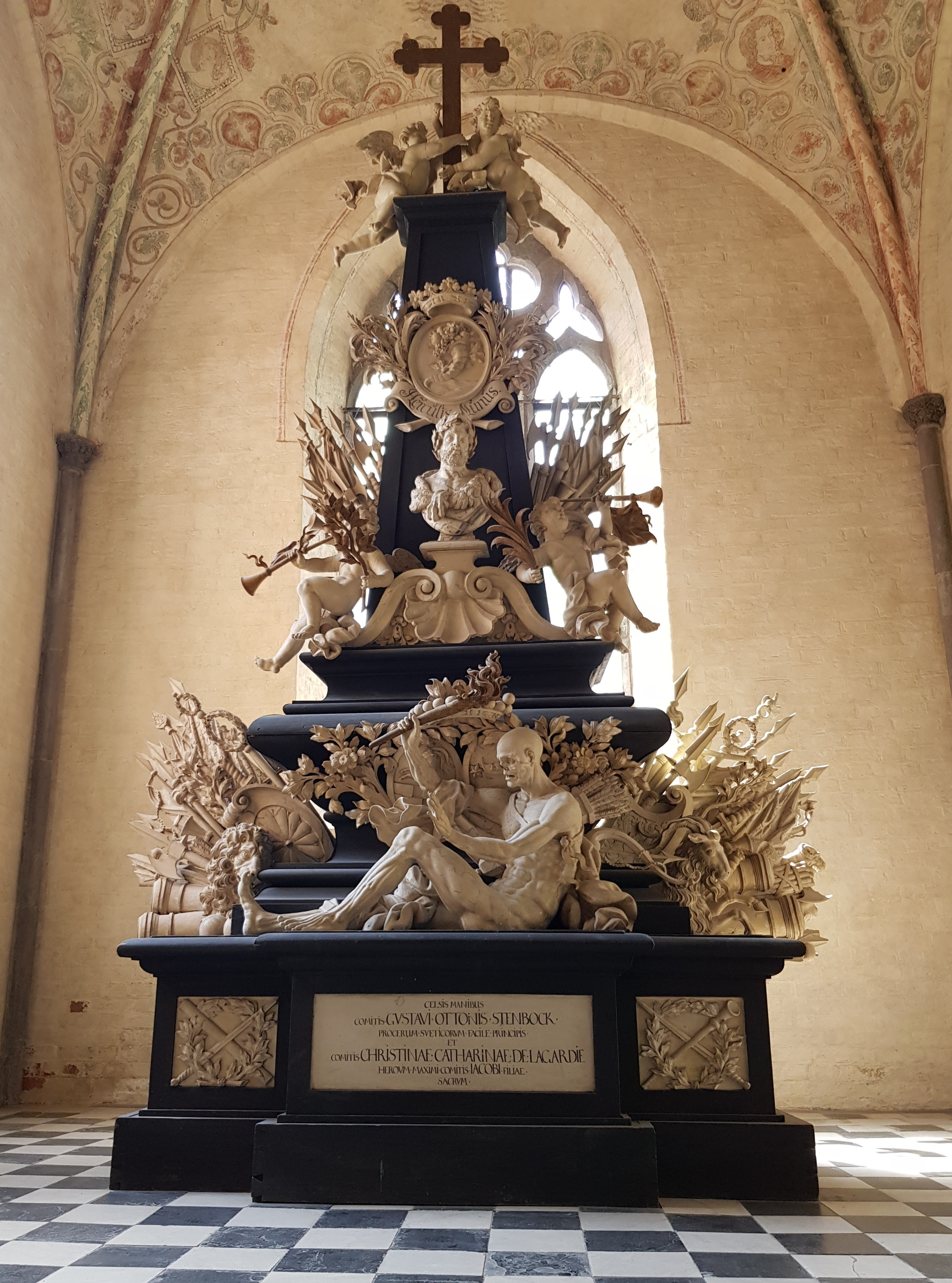
Gustaf Otto Stenbock memorial

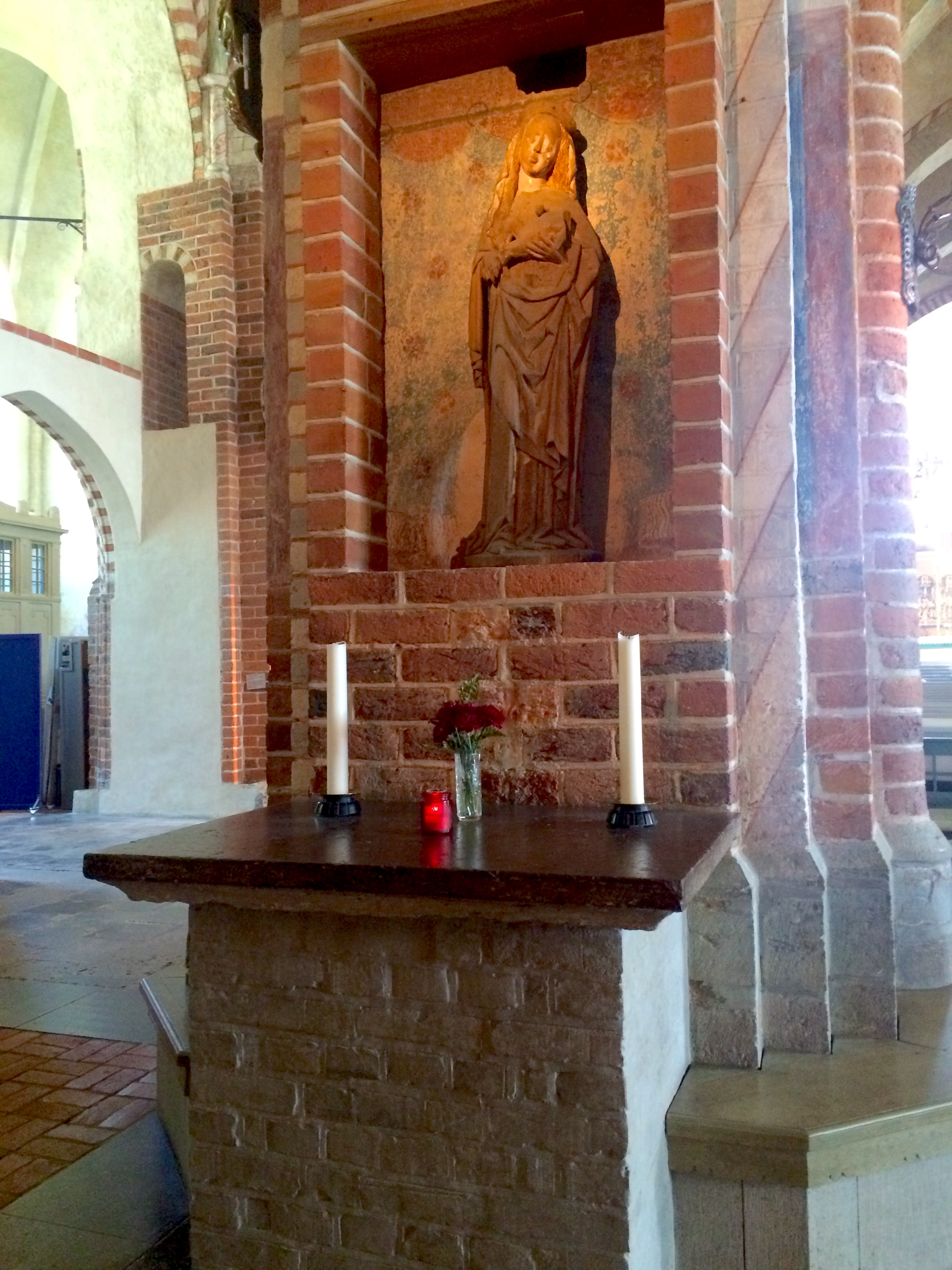
The shrine of the Blessed Virgin Mary

Viking Age memorial runestone built into the southern exterior wall of the cathedral
