= Johan Dalman =

Swedish bishop (born 1960)

The Right Reverend Johan Dalman
- Bishop of Strängnäs
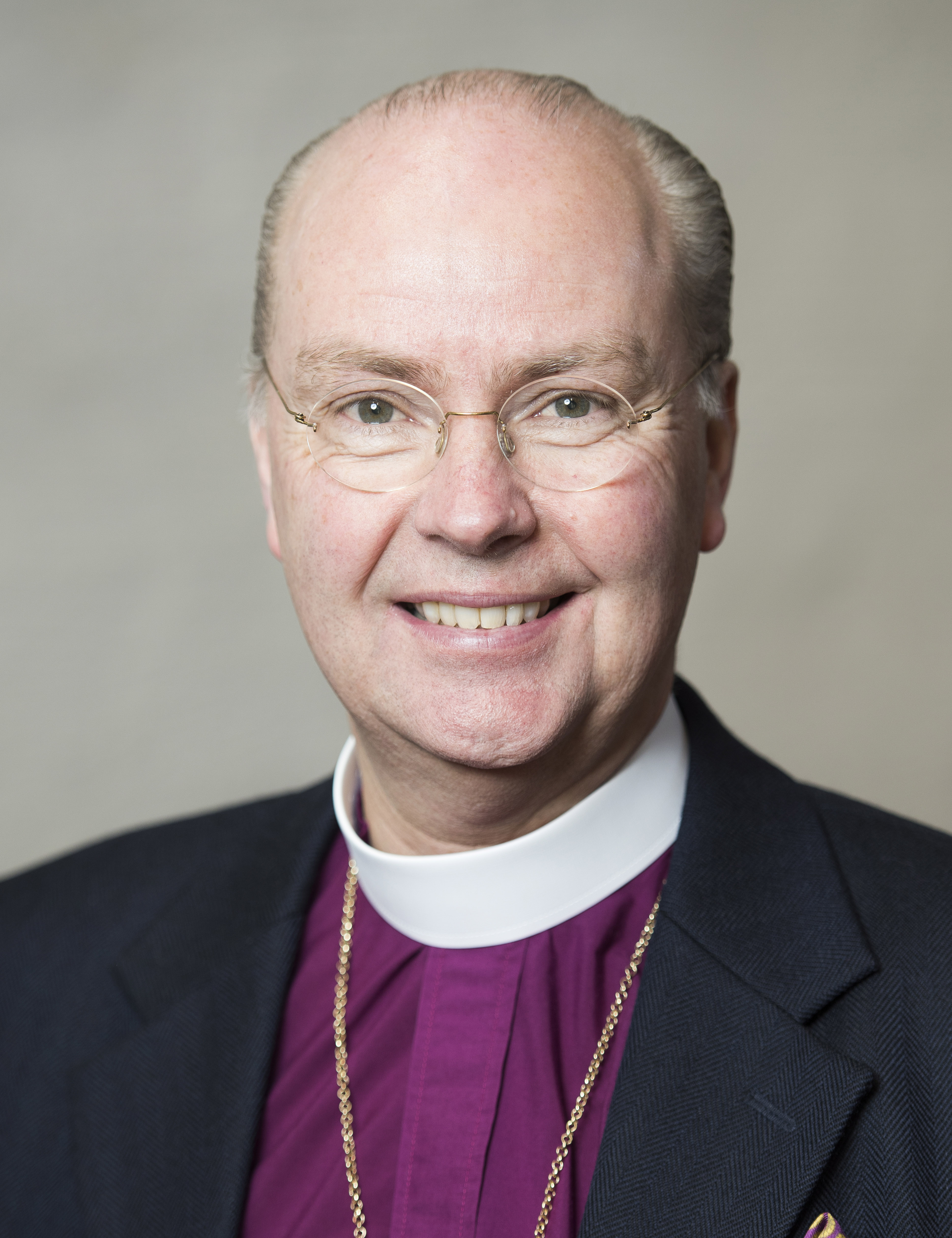
- Church: Church of Sweden
- Diocese: Strängnäs
- Appointed: 2015
- Predecessor: Hans-Erik Nordin

Orders
- Ordination: 1990
- Consecration: 6 September 2015 by Antje Jackelén

Personal details
- Born: 6 July 1960 (age 66) Gothenburg, Sweden
- Parents: Knut Dalman and Maj Tegström
- Spouse: Margareta Nisser
- Children: 3
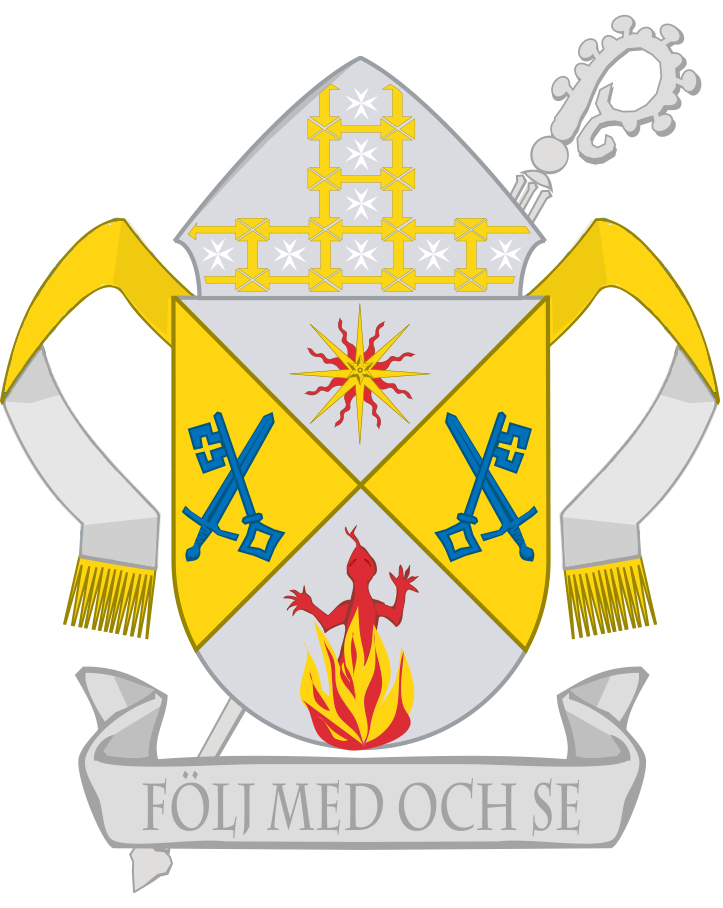
- Coat of arms

Johan Fredrik Dalman (born 6 July 1960) is a Swedish bishop.

== Biography ==
Johan Dalman is the son of director Knut Dalman and Maj Tegström. He is married to art historian Margareta Nisser Dalman, who is senior curator at the Royal Collections. The couple have three children.

Dalman was ordained a priest in 1990 for the Archdiocese of Uppsala. He became assistant pastor in Enköping, secretary for theology and ecumenism at the Church Office in Uppsala and publisher of Verbum publishers. He received his doctorate in 1989 with the thesis titled Guds tilltal i det sköna: Anthony Ashley Cooper, den tredje earlens av Shaftesbury teologiska estetik (The voice of God in the beauty of Anthony Ashley Cooper, third Earl of Shaftesbury theological aesthetics). That led to ongoing research studies at Harris Manchester College, Oxford, 1990/91. In 2008 he became dean of Strängnäs Cathedral. Dalman is particularly interested in Anglican devotion, in particular of the progressive High Church direction affirming Catholicism.

In 2010, he was nominated for as a candidate for the Diocese of Linköping, but withdrew after he received 79 of 532 votes. In the autumn of 2013 Dalman was nominated as one of five candidates for Archbishop of Uppsala where he received 4% of the votes in the nomination election. In 2015, Dalman, together with Cristina Grenholm, was nominated for Bishop of the Diocese of Strängnäs. He received 62% of the vote and was elected as Bishop on 4 March 2015 with 68.5% of the vote. He was ordained a bishop on 6 September 2015 in Uppsala Cathedral. On 29 November the same year he was appointed as chaplain to the King.
