= Täby Municipality =

Täby Municipality Täby kommun
- Municipality
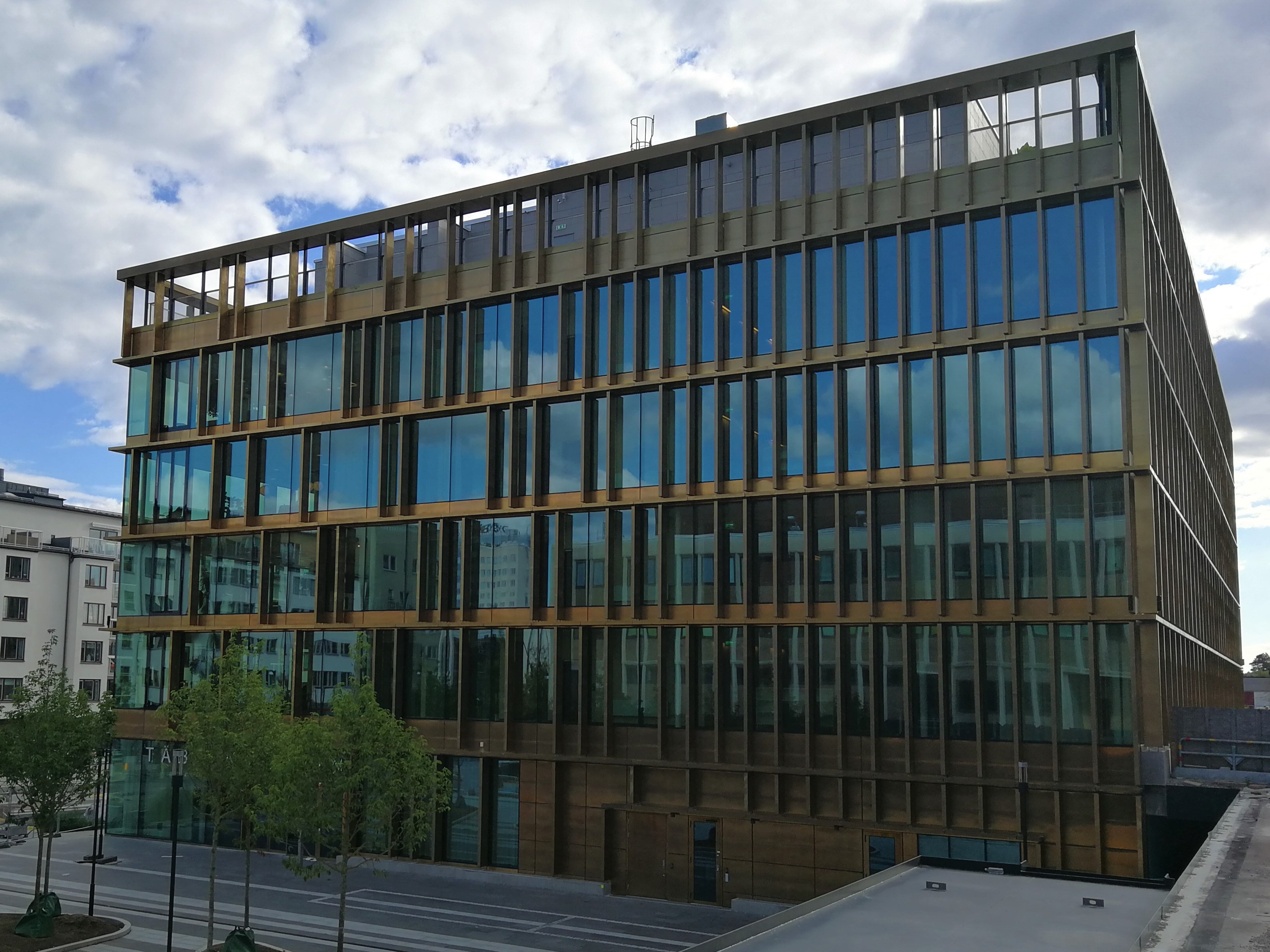
- Municipal building

- Flag Coat of arms

- Coordinates: 59°26′N 18°05′E
- Country: Sweden
- County: Stockholm County
- Seat: Täby

Area
  - Total: 71.22 km^{2} (27.50 sq mi)
  - Land: 60.72 km^{2} (23.44 sq mi)
  - Water: 10.5 km^{2} (4.1 sq mi)
- Area as of 1 January 2014.

Population (30 June 2025)
  - Total: 78,074
  - Density: 1,286/km^{2} (3,330/sq mi)
- Time zone: UTC+1 (CET)
  - Summer (DST): UTC+2 (CEST)
- ISO 3166 code: SE
- Province: Uppland
- Municipal code: 0160
- Website: www.taby.se
- Density is calculated using land area only.

Täby Municipality (Swedish: Täby kommun) is a municipality north of Stockholm in Stockholm County in east central Sweden. Its seat is located in the town of Täby (Swedish pronunciation: [ˈtɛ̌ːbʏ]). Täby Municipality can be characterized as a suburb of Stockholm.

The municipality is one of few in Sweden which has approximately the same size as the original entity created out of Täby parish, when the first local government acts came into force in 1863. It has not been amalgamated with other units, but minor changes of its limits have been carried out.

== Localities ==
For statistical purposes the municipality is divided into two non-administrative urban areas (tätort). The southern built-up area constituted until 2014 the multimunicipal urban area Täby which was partly situated in Danderyd Municipality. From 2015 it is considered part of Stockholm urban area.

The northern built-up area, (Täby kyrkby) is part of the bimunicipal Vallentuna urban area, of which the main part constitutes the seat of Vallentuna Municipality.

The southern part is Ella Gård or in English Ella Farm, which was the location of one of the largest farms in Täby during the 19th century.

== Demography ==
=== Population development ===
Population development in Täby Municipality 1970–2026
| Year | Population |
|---|---|
| 1970 | 38,406 |
| 1975 | 41,307 |
| 1980 | 47,105 |
| 1985 | 54,185 |
| 1990 | 56,714 |
| 1995 | 58,833 |
| 2000 | 60,197 |
| 2005 | 60,594 |
| 2010 | 63,789 |
| 2015 | 68,281 |
| 2017 | 70,405 |
| 2019 | 71,874 |
| 2023 | 76,738 |
| 2026 | 78,849 |
Source: SCB – Folkmängd efter region och år.

=== 2022 by district ===
This is a demographic table based on Täby Municipality's electoral districts in the 2022 Swedish general election sourced from SVT's election platform, in turn taken from SCB official statistics.

In total there were 73,870 residents, including 54,267 Swedish citizens of voting age. 37.1% voted for the left coalition and 61.8% for the right coalition. Indicators are in percentage points except population totals and income.

| Location | Residents | Citizen adults | Left vote | Right vote | Employed | Swedish parents | Foreign heritage | Income SEK | Degree |
| Location | | | % | % | | | | | |
|---|---|---|---|---|---|---|---|---|---|
| 1 Täby kyrkby | 1,794 | 1,232 | 37.0 | 61.9 | 82 | 78 | 22 | 37,765 | 65 |
| 2 Runborg | 2,000 | 1,390 | 41.9 | 57.5 | 86 | 83 | 17 | 40,585 | 68 |
| 3 Byle | 2,358 | 1,514 | 35.1 | 64.0 | 88 | 83 | 17 | 44,118 | 67 |
| 4 Midgård | 2,143 | 1,531 | 43.8 | 55.4 | 84 | 80 | 20 | 32,888 | 59 |
| 5 Vallatorp S | 1,851 | 1,279 | 30.6 | 68.7 | 86 | 79 | 21 | 41,321 | 69 |
| 6 Vallatorp N | 1,873 | 1,275 | 37.0 | 62.0 | 87 | 81 | 19 | 38,884 | 65 |
| 7 Visinge | 1,574 | 1,105 | 39.6 | 59.3 | 85 | 82 | 18 | 38,540 | 66 |
| 8 Erikslund | 1,750 | 1,221 | 38.3 | 61.0 | 85 | 80 | 20 | 37,613 | 67 |
| 9 Skarpäng N | 2,260 | 1,596 | 34.1 | 65.3 | 86 | 83 | 17 | 43,442 | 72 |
| 10 Ella park | 2,495 | 1,685 | 31.6 | 67.7 | 86 | 82 | 18 | 45,192 | 76 |
| 11 Ensta, Kullagränd | 2,025 | 1,542 | 36.4 | 62.9 | 80 | 77 | 23 | 33,035 | 65 |
| 12 Skarpäng S | 1,485 | 1,060 | 35.8 | 63.2 | 86 | 85 | 15 | 45,515 | 77 |
| 13 Ella gård V | 1,853 | 1,384 | 37.1 | 62.0 | 85 | 85 | 15 | 37,355 | 76 |
| 14 Ella gård N | 1,690 | 1,176 | 42.1 | 56.6 | 83 | 82 | 18 | 39,895 | 75 |
| 15 Roslags-Näsby N | 1,729 | 1,435 | 39.1 | 59.3 | 82 | 79 | 21 | 32,255 | 64 |
| 16 Storstugan | 1,294 | 1,170 | 40.9 | 58.0 | 69 | 60 | 40 | 22,626 | 52 |
| 17 Täby C | 1,301 | 1,143 | 32.9 | 65.5 | 77 | 72 | 28 | 28,693 | 61 |
| 18 Näsbydal | 1,343 | 1,125 | 44.0 | 55.0 | 78 | 70 | 30 | 27,044 | 61 |
| 19 Roslags-Näsby S | 1,580 | 1,121 | 37.3 | 62.1 | 80 | 72 | 28 | 34,527 | 69 |
| 20 Arninge, Ullna | 2,331 | 1,351 | 33.8 | 64.8 | 86 | 61 | 39 | 34,395 | 59 |
| 21 Löttingelund | 1,174 | 809 | 37.2 | 61.4 | 83 | 79 | 21 | 42,761 | 67 |
| 22 Gribbylund N | 1,447 | 1,064 | 34.0 | 65.5 | 88 | 81 | 19 | 42,177 | 68 |
| 23 Gribbylund V | 2,476 | 1,671 | 36.7 | 62.0 | 85 | 78 | 22 | 38,901 | 66 |
| 24 Gribbylund C | 1,376 | 1,012 | 45.9 | 53.1 | 72 | 53 | 47 | 24,200 | 42 |
| 25 Åkerbyvägen | 1,924 | 1,483 | 41.4 | 57.7 | 83 | 68 | 32 | 27,813 | 53 |
| 26 Marknadsvägen | 1,866 | 1,308 | 44.0 | 54.4 | 79 | 58 | 42 | 27,304 | 52 |
| 27 Gribbylund S | 1,950 | 1,457 | 38.5 | 61.0 | 85 | 80 | 20 | 39,126 | 72 |
| 28 Grindtorp S | 1,276 | 1,143 | 44.3 | 54.2 | 81 | 62 | 38 | 26,362 | 53 |
| 29 Grindtorp N | 2,011 | 1,675 | 43.0 | 56.0 | 82 | 71 | 29 | 29,168 | 57 |
| 30 Täby park | 1,412 | 1,123 | 42.3 | 56.7 | 84 | 59 | 41 | 32,528 | 63 |
| 31 Viggbyholm V | 1,272 | 1,057 | 42.1 | 56.8 | 79 | 77 | 23 | 27,146 | 55 |
| 32 Viggbyholm N | 1,957 | 1,326 | 34.7 | 64.6 | 85 | 84 | 16 | 42,887 | 73 |
| 33 Hägernäs N | 2,036 | 1,564 | 47.3 | 51.2 | 82 | 64 | 36 | 25,361 | 45 |
| 34 Lahäll, Näsbygård | 2,568 | 1,797 | 33.4 | 65.9 | 86 | 85 | 15 | 40,830 | 75 |
| 35 Norskogen | 2,321 | 1,593 | 37.0 | 61.2 | 79 | 61 | 39 | 29,990 | 54 |
| 36 Näsbypark C | 1,783 | 1,537 | 33.5 | 65.2 | 80 | 80 | 20 | 28,282 | 65 |
| 37 Näsbypark Ö | 1,834 | 1,348 | 25.2 | 74.3 | 84 | 84 | 16 | 48,801 | 77 |
| 38 Viggbyholm S | 2,337 | 1,665 | 29.5 | 69.1 | 79 | 74 | 26 | 36,897 | 63 |
| 39 Hägernäs S | 1,828 | 1,512 | 32.9 | 66.0 | 83 | 70 | 30 | 34,160 | 54 |
| 40 Näsbypark V | 1,175 | 856 | 32.3 | 66.5 | 80 | 85 | 15 | 40,655 | 74 |
| 41 Näsby slott | 1,118 | 932 | 25.4 | 74.4 | 82 | 88 | 12 | 53,402 | 79 |
Source: SVT

=== Income and education ===
Täby is one of the wealthiest municipalities in Sweden, with the 2nd highest median income per capita. The share of highly educated persons, according to Statistics Sweden's definition: persons with post-secondary education that is three years or longer, is 43.9% and the 6th highest in the country.

=== Residents with a foreign background ===
On 31 December 2017 the number of people with a foreign background (persons born outside of Sweden or with two parents born outside of Sweden) was 15 429, or 21.91% of the population (70 405 on 31 December 2017). On 31 December 2002 the number of residents with a foreign background was (per the same definition) 9 760, or 16.21% of the population (60 198 on 31 December 2002). On 31 December 2017 there were 70 405 residents in Täby, of which 12 183 people (17.30%) were born in a country other than Sweden. Divided by country in the table below – the Nordic countries as well as the 12 most common countries of birth outside of Sweden for Swedish residents have been included, with other countries of birth bundled together by continent by Statistics Sweden.

Country of birth
31 December 2017
| 1 | Sweden | 58,222 |
| 2 | European Union: Other countries | 2,095 |
| 3 | Asia: Other countries | 1,968 |
| 4 | Finland | 1,235 |
| 5 | Iran | 1,231 |
| 6 | Poland | 757 |
| 7 | South America | 641 |
| 8 | Europe outside of the EU: other countries | 623 |
| 9 | Germany | 516 |
| 10 | Africa: Other countries | 480 |
| 11 | North America | 378 |
| 12 | Iraq | 365 |
| 13 | Syria | 353 |
| 14 | Norway | 283 |
| 15 | Thailand | 228 |
| 16 | Yugoslavia/Yugoslavia; SFR Yugoslavia/Serbia and Montenegro | 208 |
| 17 | Afghanistan | 175 |
| 18 | Denmark | 153 |
| 19 | Soviet Union | 111 |
| 20 | Bosnia and Herzegovina | 104 |
| 21 | Turkey | 104 |
| 22 | Oceania | 65 |
| 23 | Eritrea | 51 |
| 24 | Iceland | 34 |
| 25 | Somalia | 15 |
| 26 | Unknown country of birth | 10 |

== Public transportation ==
The municipality is served by the Stockholm public transport system through SL. There are thirteen stops on all the three branches of the narrow gauge Roslagsbanan suburban railway. There are also bus connections with the Stockholm Metro as well as an extensive internal bus network.

== History ==
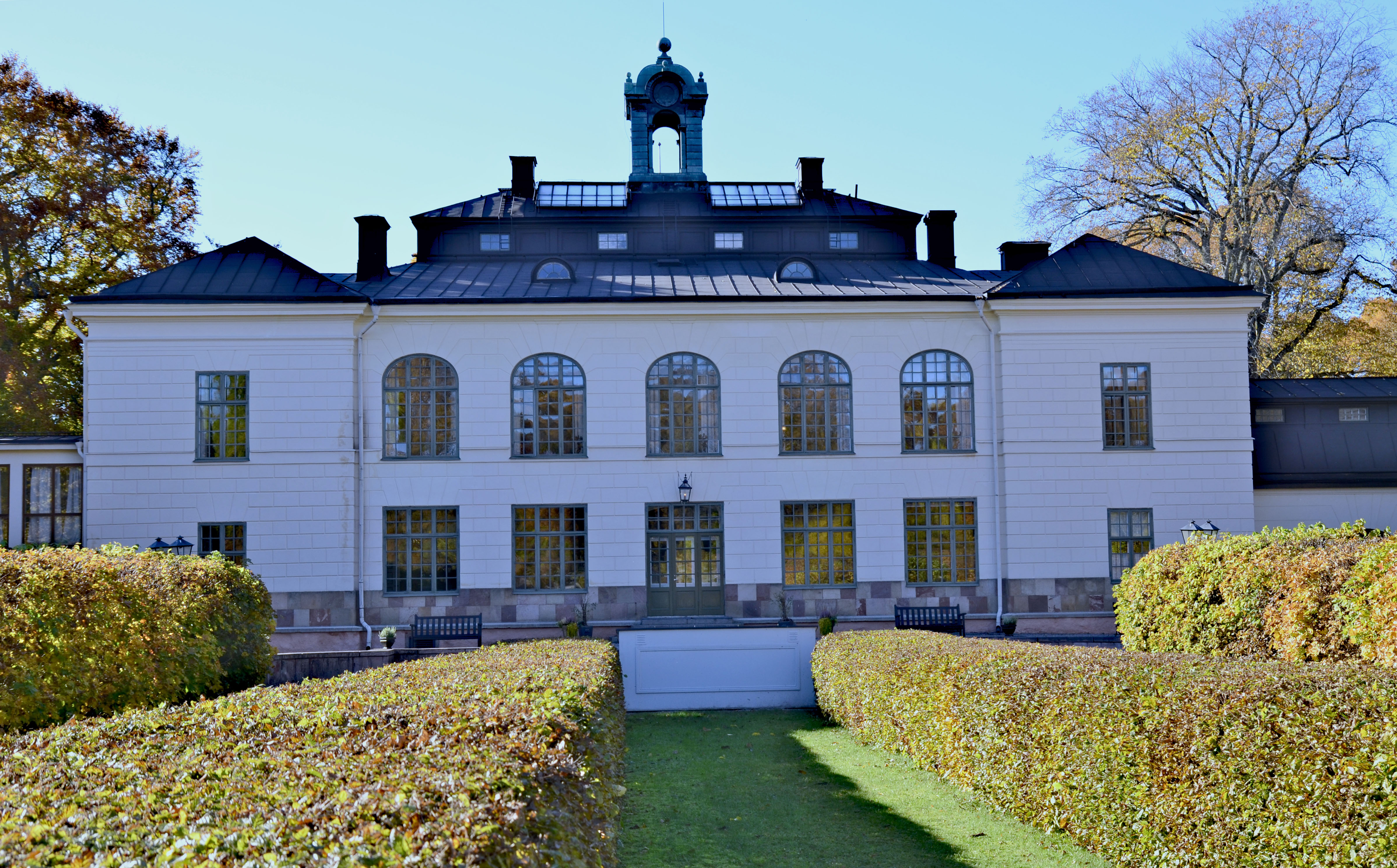
Näsby Manor

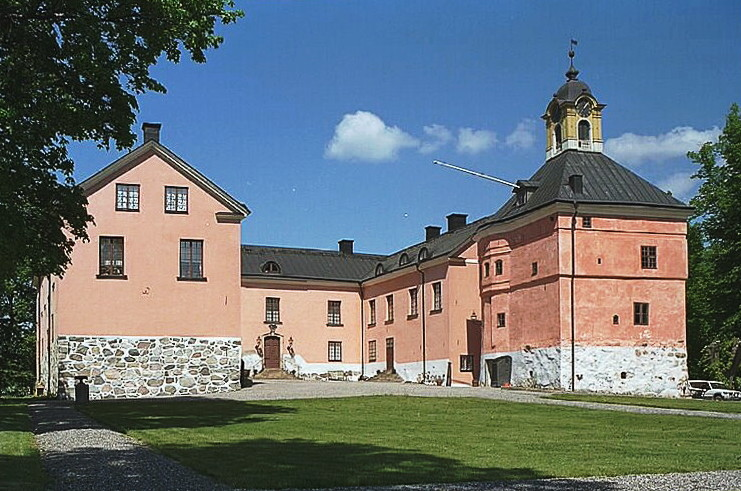
Rydboholm Manor

During the first millennium, Täby was part of the lands of the Svear, known as Svitjod. Remains from this period can be found in more than 37 runestones found in the municipality. In the north of the municipality can be found, the remains of the 11th-century causeway known as Jarlabankes bro. The cross on Täby's coat of arms is found on the Risbylestenen, a runestone, in the northern part of the municipality. It is said that this runestone shows the first signs of Christianity reaching this part of Europe. (Note: Täby's coat of arms has a Byzantine cross which is apparently a reference to the town's relationship with Constantinople (Miklagard or Old Norse Mikligarðr) and the Byzantine Empire during the age of the Vikings.) During the Middle Ages, Täby was part of the Attundaland region.

Täby remained a rural community until the 19th century. Most of the land was owned by the noble families. During the 16th and 17th centuries, most of the land in eastern Täby was owned by the Brahe family of Rydboholm Manor (Rydboholms slott). Other noble families owning land in Täby at different times during this period were Banér, Bååth, Roos, Sparre, Gyllenstierna and Meijerfeldt.

The latter two owned, at different times, Näsby Manor (Näsby Slott) in the southeast of the municipality. By 1790 Täby had a population of approximately 900 people, most of them living on one of the 36 farms. By the end of the 19th century the population had grown to approximately 1,250.

In 1885, the Roslagsbanan narrow-gauge railway was built, connecting Täby with the city of Stockholm. Täby experienced a population expansion. People settled near the railway stations. In 1902 the wealthy engineer Carl Robert Lamm (1856–1938), acquired the burned down Näsby Manor and rebuilt it.

Around the time of the First World War many city dwellers in Stockholm acquired small summer residences in the eastern part of Täby, what is now the district of Näsbypark. By 1919 Täby's population had grown to 3,000. Some years after Second World War Täby increasingly became a suburb of Stockholm, and by 1947 the population had increased to 8,584, concentrated in the southern and eastern parts of the municipality.

In 1948 Täby acquired the title of a "merchant town" (Swedish: köping), valid until the reform of 1971. This was also the beginning of the large scale development of Täby, led by the mayor Gustaf Berg. By 1975 the population had increased to 41,307 people.

Today, Täby is considered an attractive suburb to Stockholm with one of the highest median incomes in Sweden.

== Politics ==
Täby has for a long period of time been run by a coalition of centre-right parties. Filippa Reinfeldt, ex-wife of Fredrik Reinfeldt (the former Swedish Prime Minister and former leader of the Moderate Party), served as mayor between 2005 and 2006. Since the 2022 election, the municipality is governed by the Alliansen lit. 'The alliance' coalition, which Moderate Party politician Erik Andersson serving as mayor.

The slogan of the municipality is today in translation "Täby, the city on the countryside".

== Sights ==
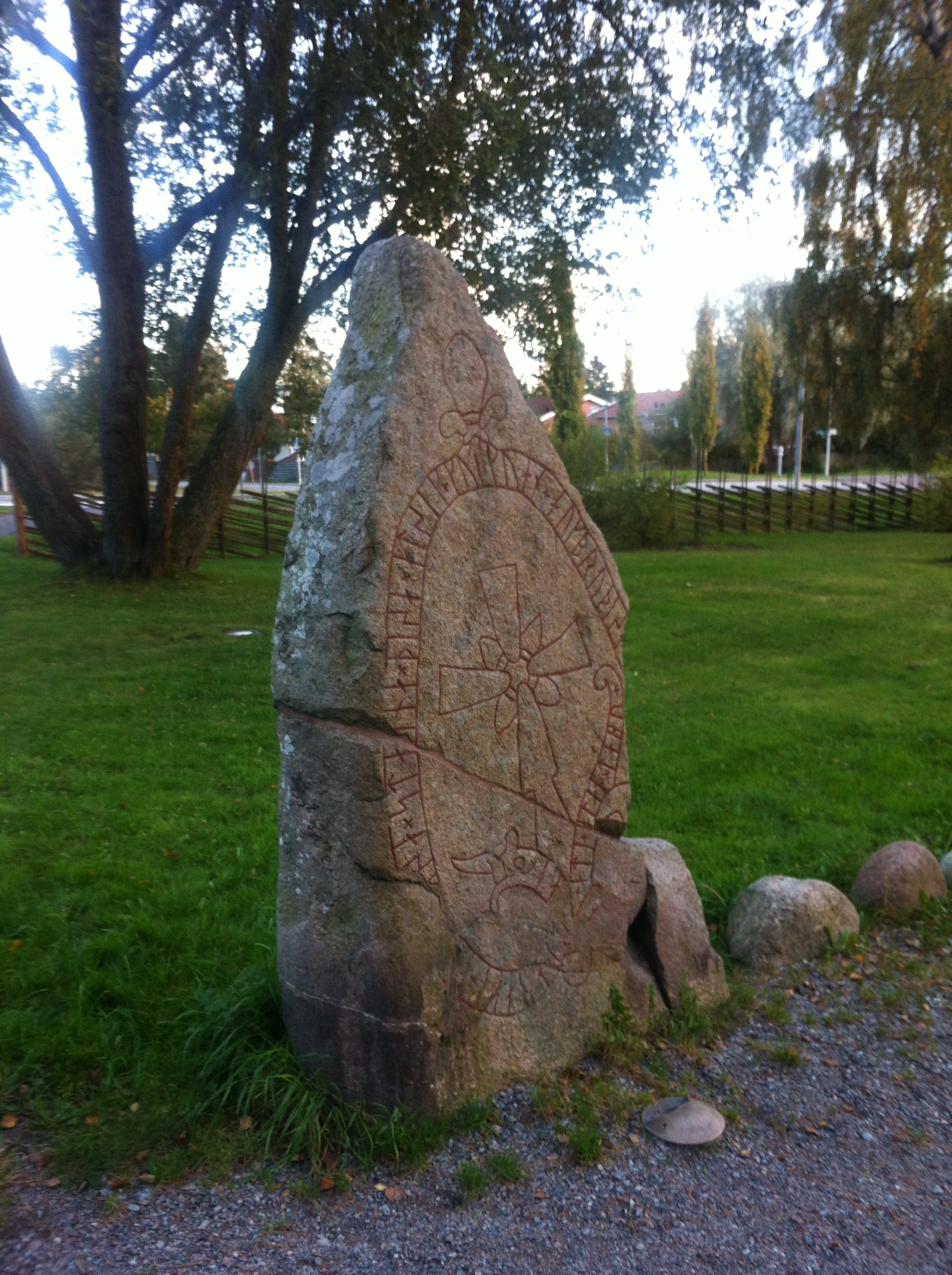
Runestone at Jarlabankes bro

- Runestones: There are 37 identified runestones in Täby. Their inscriptions have provided many interesting and useful insights into the life and destinies of the people of the Viking Age. Judging from the inscriptions of the runestones and legends, the most important man at that time was Jarlabanke Ingefastsson (ca. 1000). He has given name to the remains of the Viking era causeway known as Jarlabankes bro.
- Näsby Manor: Originally built in the 1660s and designed by Nicodemus Tessin the Elder, Näsby Manor is located in the picturesque and natural setting of Näsbyviken shore. The manor was burned to the ground in 1897, but was rebuilt according to the original design on the initiative of Carl Robert and Dora Lamm who moved into the manor in 1905. Parts of the old manor garden still exist and are being well preserved.
- Taby Racecourse: Sweden's largest horse racing track, inaugurated in 1960.
- Täby Church: Built in the 13th century. It houses a triptych from the 15th century. The most notable objects are the wall paintings from the medieval times, painted by Albertus Pictor. One of them, Death playing chess, portrays a man playing chess with the Grim Reaper and was the inspiration for the movie director Ingmar Bergman when he made the perhaps best known Swedish movie ever, The Seventh Seal.

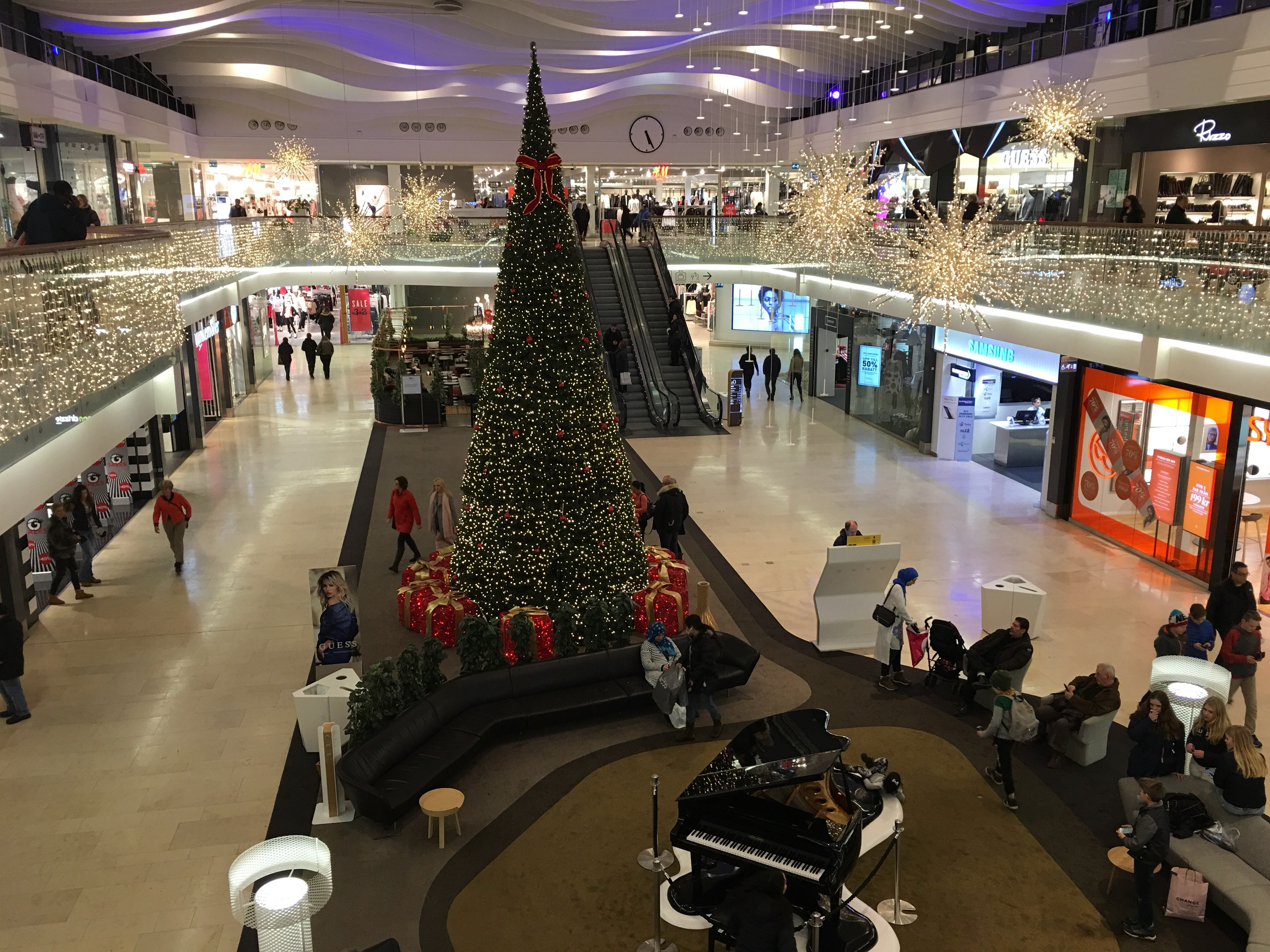
Täby Centrum

- Täby Centrum: One of Sweden's largest shopping malls.

== Notable natives ==
- Sara Danius (1962–2019), professor of aesthetics, former permanent secretary of the Swedish Academy
- Henrik Holm (b. 1968), professional tennis player
- Sara Lumholdt (b. 1984), singer and former member of pop band A*Teens
- Kristian Luuk (b. 1966), comedian and talk show-host
- Eric Prydz (b. 1976), DJ and producer
- Fredrik Reinfeldt (b. 1965), politician, Prime Minister of Sweden 2006–2014
- Filippa Reinfeldt (b. 1967), politician, former Mayor and Commissioner of Täby, Commissioner of Health Services of Stockholm County 2006–2014, former wife of Fredrik Reinfeldt
- Johan Rheborg (b. 1963), comedian
- Stig Engström (1935–2000), suspected murderer of Olof Palme

== Sister towns ==
Täby is twinned with the following municipalities:

- Järvenpää, Finland
- Lørenskog Municipality, Norway
- Reinbek, Germany
- Rødovre Municipality, Denmark
- Viimsi Parish, Estonia

== Gallery ==
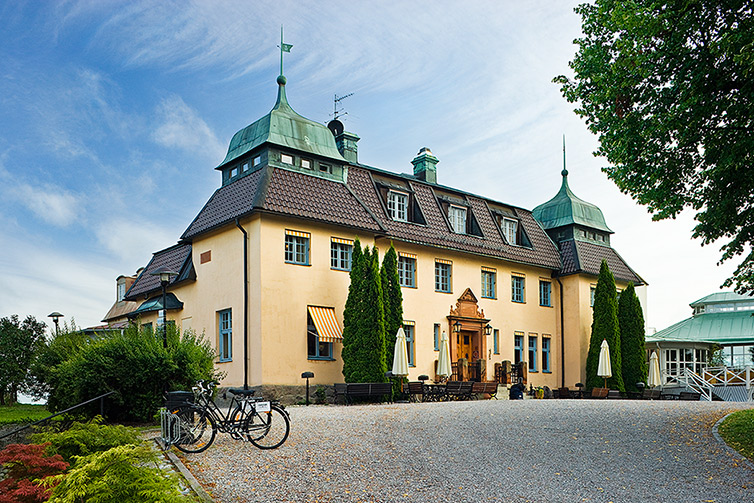
Såstaholm manor, now used as a conference site

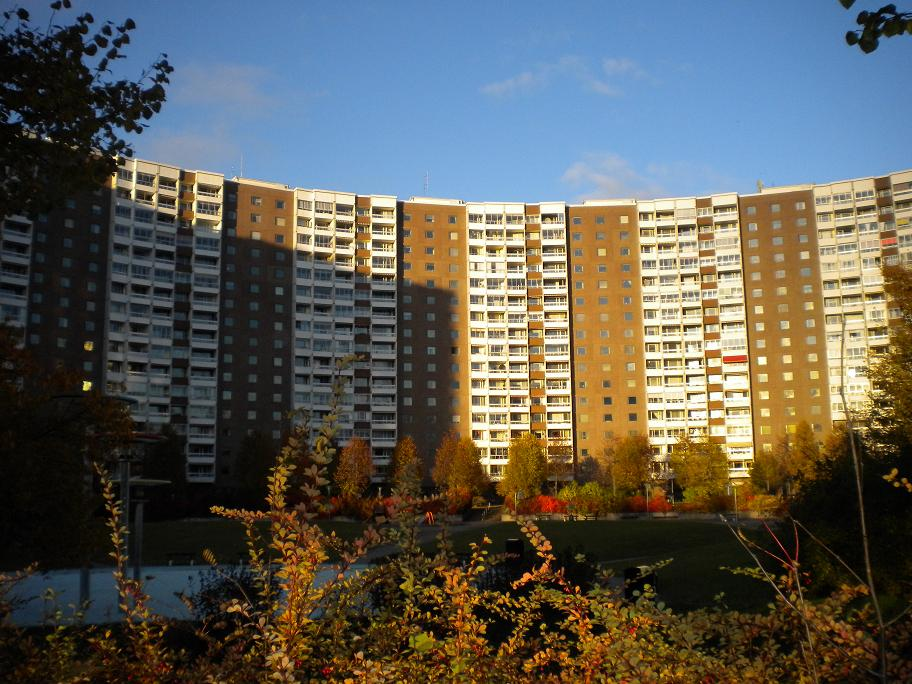
The Storstugan building close to Täby centrum

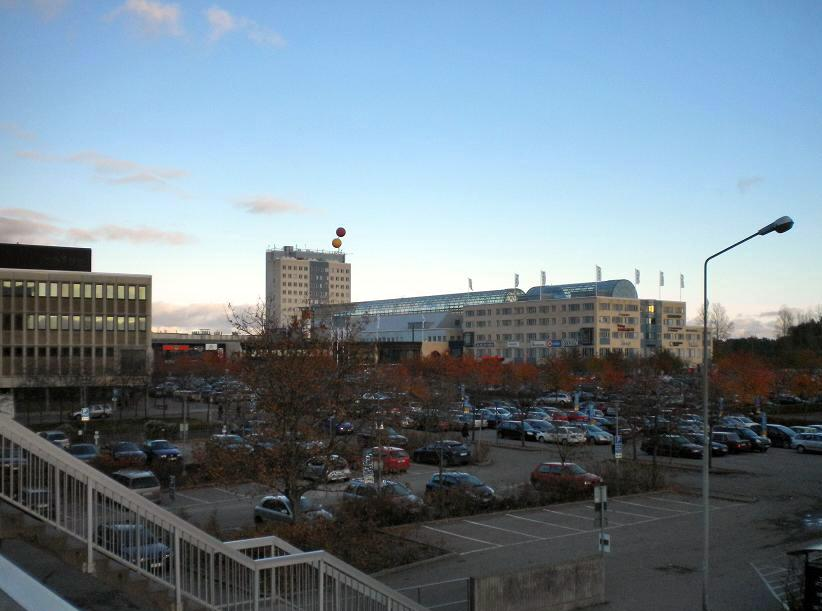
Täby centrum shopping mall

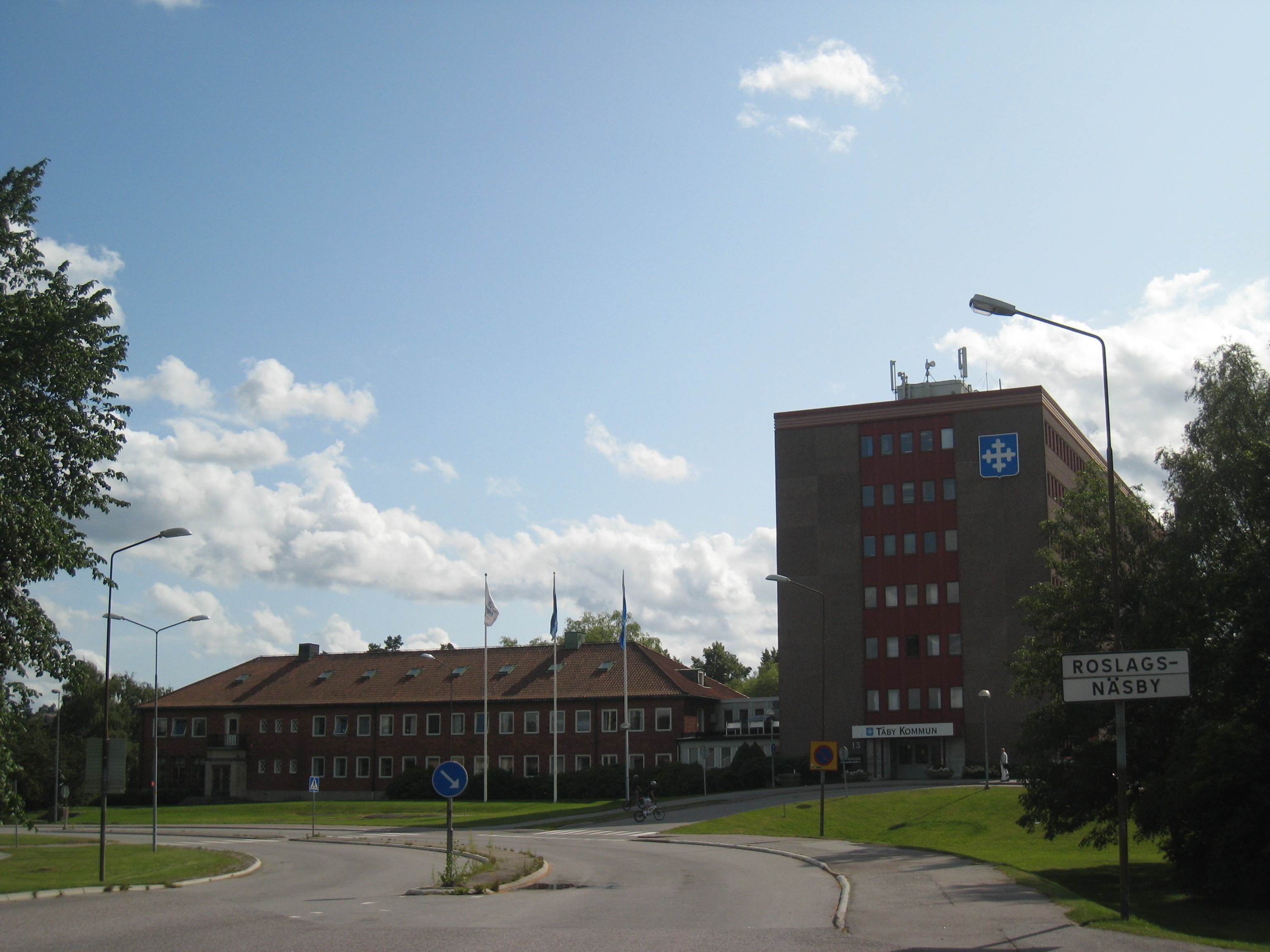
Old municipal building of Täby Municipality, demolished in 2017–2018.

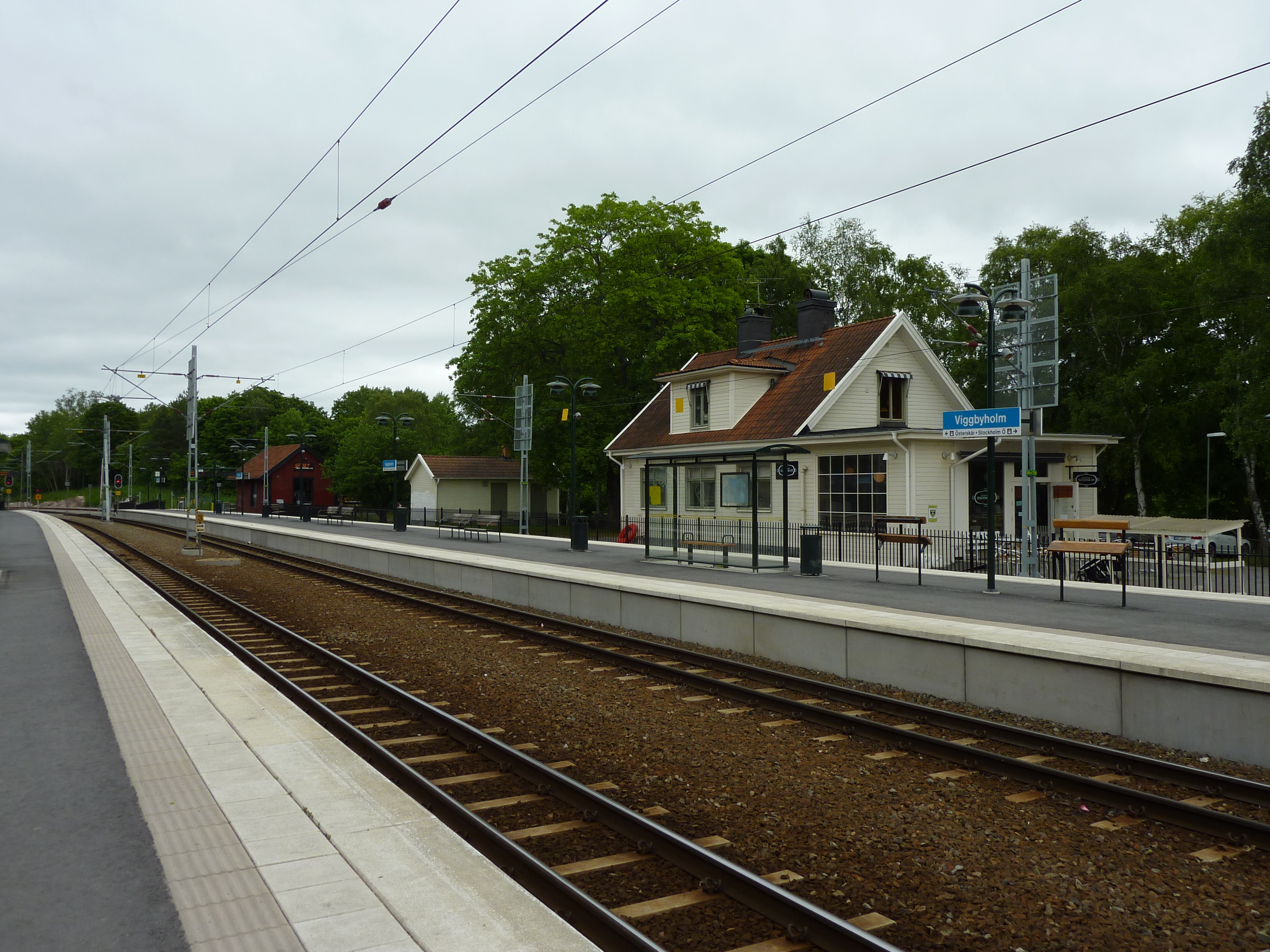
Viggbyholm station at Roslagsbanan.

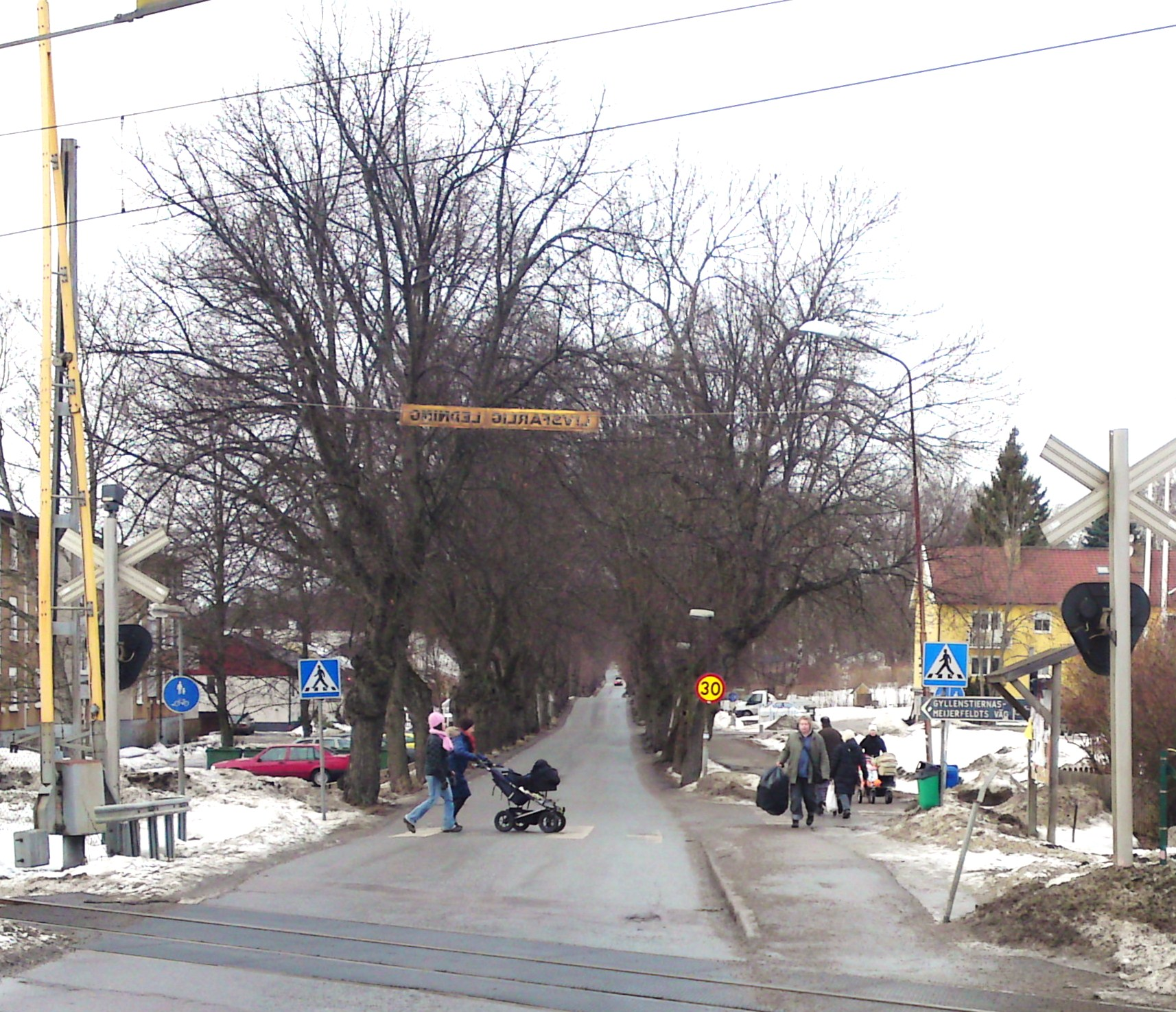
Road in Näsbypark with railroad crossing of Roslagsbanan.
