= Vancouver Film Critics Circle Awards 2020 =

Annual Canadian film awards ceremony

The 21st Vancouver Film Critics Circle Awards honoured the films selected by the Vancouver Film Critics Circle as the best of 2020. Although usually presented in December of the same year for which the awards are presented, these awards were delayed to the winter of 2021, due to the COVID-19 pandemic in Canada and the associated complications in film production and distribution.

Nominations for the Canadian film categories were announced on February 3, 2021, and nominations in the international categories were announced on February 19. The international winners were announced on February 22, and the Canadian winners were announced on March 8.

== Winners and nominees ==
=== International ===
Category	Winners and nominees	Films	Ref.
Best Film	Chloé Zhao	Nomadland	
Best Film	David Fincher	Mank	
Best Film	Emerald Fennell	Promising Young Woman	
Best Actor	Chadwick Boseman	Ma Rainey's Black Bottom	
Best Actor	Riz Ahmed	Sound of Metal	
Best Actor	Anthony Hopkins	The Father	
Best Actor	Gary Oldman	Mank	
Best Actress	Frances McDormand	Nomadland	
Best Actress	Viola Davis	Ma Rainey's Black Bottom	
Best Actress	Carey Mulligan	Promising Young Woman	
Best Supporting Actor	Daniel Kaluuya	Judas and the Black Messiah	
Best Supporting Actor	Sacha Baron Cohen	The Trial of the Chicago 7	
Best Supporting Actor	Leslie Odom Jr.	One Night in Miami...	
Best Supporting Actress	Youn Yuh-jung	Minari	
Best Supporting Actress	Maria Bakalova	Borat Subsequent Moviefilm	
Best Supporting Actress	Amanda Seyfried	Mank	
Best Director	Chloé Zhao	Nomadland	
Best Director	David Fincher	Mank	
Best Director	Thomas Vinterberg	Another Round (Druk)	
Best Screenplay	Aaron Sorkin	The Trial of the Chicago 7	
Best Screenplay	Emerald Fennell	Promising Young Woman	
Best Screenplay	Jack Fincher	Mank	
Best Documentary	Alexander Nanau	Collective	
Best Documentary	Bonni Cohen and Jon Shenk	Athlete A	
Best Documentary	Alex Gibney	Totally Under Control	
Best Foreign Language Film	Lee Isaac Chung	Minari	
Best Foreign Language Film	Thomas Vinterberg	Another Round (Druk)	
Best Foreign Language Film	Andrei Konchalovsky	Dear Comrades! (Dorogie tovarishchi!)	

=== Canadian ===
Category	Winners and nominees	Films	Ref.
Best Film	Madeleine Sims-Fewer and Dusty Mancinelli	Violation	
Best Film	Brandon Cronenberg	Possessor	
Best Film	Sean Durkin	The Nest	
Best Actor	Justin Rain	Brother, I Cry	
Best Actor	Adam Brody	The Kid Detective	
Best Actor	Alex Crowther	Flowers of the Field	
Best Actor	Marlon Kazadi	Chained	
Best Actress	Madeleine Sims-Fewer	Violation	
Best Actress	Carrie Coon	The Nest	
Best Actress	Andrea Riseborough	Possessor	
Best Supporting Actor	Christopher Abbott	Possessor	
Best Supporting Actor	Adam Beach	Monkey Beach	
Best Supporting Actor	Adrian Holmes	Chained	
Best Supporting Actor	Aleks Paunovic	Chained	
Best Supporting Actress	Rainbow Dickerson	Beans	
Best Supporting Actress	Tina Lameman	Monkey Beach	
Best Supporting Actress	Jennifer Jason Leigh	Possessor	
Best Director	Brandon Cronenberg	Possessor	
Best Director	Sean Durkin	The Nest	
Best Director	Madeleine Sims-Fewer and Dusty Mancinelli	Violation	
Best Screenplay	Sean Durkin	The Nest	
Best Screenplay	Brandon Cronenberg	Possessor	
Best Screenplay	Titus Heckel	Chained	
Best Documentary	Jennifer Abbott and Joel Bakan	The New Corporation: The Unfortunately Necessary Sequel	
Best Documentary	Jennifer Abbott	The Magnitude of All Things	
Best Documentary	Ariel Nasr	The Forbidden Reel	
Best British Columbia Film	Titus Heckel	Chained	
Best British Columbia Film	Jennifer Abbott and Joel Bakan	The New Corporation: The Unfortunately Necessary Sequel	
Best British Columbia Film	Jessie Anthony	Brother, I Cry	
One to Watch	Titus Heckel	Chained	
One to Watch	Kiawenti:io Tarbell	Beans	
One to Watch	Jessie Anthony	Brother, I Cry	
