= Katherine Dodds =

Canadian writer, artist, filmmaker

Katherine Dodds is a Canadian writer, artist, and filmmaker. After graduating from the University of Victoria in 1995, Dodds worked for Adbusters magazine and directed commercials. In 2001, she founded Hello Cool World Media, which distributed various films and was behind the grassroots marketing campaign for the 2003 film The Corporation., before she was named an Impact Producer by Tracey Friesen in 2016. In 2019, Dodds founded a sharing service called Cool World Technologies, Inc., and in that same year, Dodds became the recipient of a 2019 BC Community Achievement Award.

== Career ==
Dodds studied painting at the University of Victoria in the 1980s, graduating with an honours BFA in 1985. She received an MA with distinction from the University of Leeds, UK (Department of Fine Art and Cultural Studies) in 1998 in feminist theory and the visual arts. From 1992–1997, Dodds worked as a marketing manager and associate editor for Adbusters magazine. She directed the a commercial called Obsession Fetish, which parodies Calvin Klein, and addressed eating disorders with the tagline "The beauty industry is the beast."

In 2001, Dodds founded the social cause communications company Good Company Communications Inc, doing business as Hello Cool World Media. Dodds is the creative director and strategist behind Hello Cool World projects. Hello Cool World is known for the logo and grassroots marketing for The Corporation (2003), which premiered in theaters in January 2004. With Mark Achbar, the directors produced a three-part DVD version of the film designed for high school students. Hello Cool World is also the Canadian distributor for the award-winning documentary 65 Redroses, and the educational sub-distributor of the 2017 film Indian Horse, based on the book of the same name by the acclaimed Indigenous author Richard Wagamese.

In 2016, Dodds was named as an "Impact Producer" in Tracey Friesen's book Story Money Impact: Funding Media for Social Change. She was also the Impact Producer for The New Corporation, a sequel directed by Joel Bakan and Jennifer Abbott. She was the director of the digital media companion project TheNewCorporation.app, alongside a new platform for impact engagement "Cool.World." Dodds and Bakan pitched their impact campaign at the November 2018 Good Pitch Vancouver.

In 2019, she co-founded Cool World Technologies, Inc. a service to promote other impact projects. Mark Achbar granted Dodds and Hello Cool World worldwide rights to manage the brand and distribution for The Corporation and his previous film Manufacturing Consent (1992).

On July 19, 2021, due to Twitter's refusal to boost an ad for The New Corporation, Bakan and Dodds filed a constitutional challenge accusing the platform and the Canadian government of failing to protect freedom of expression and democracy over refusal to allow ads about a Canadian documentary film.

=== As a writer ===
Dodds is the writer of Picturing Transformation Nexw-áyantsut, a book published in October 2013 by Figure 1 Publishing. The book features the photographic artwork of Uts'am Witness Project co-founder Nancy Bleck and was written with her and Squamish Nation Hereditary Chief Bill Williams. In 2023, Dodds started working with Adbusters magazine again, helping with their new book Manifesto for World Revolution, and serving as a contributing editor.

== Awards ==
In 2006, Dodds received a "Woman of Vision" Artistic Achievement Award from Women in Film Video Vancouver for her work in multimedia. Dodds is also the recipient of a 2019 BC Community Achievement Award.
