= Chris Barrett (filmmaker) =

American film director

- Born: July 24, 1982 (age 44); Bryn Mawr, Pennsylvania
- Education: Pepperdine University
- Occupations: Internet Entrepreneur, Filmmaker, Spokesperson, Author
- Political party: Democratic Party

Chris Barrett (born July 24, 1982, in Bryn Mawr, Pennsylvania) is an American Internet entrepreneur, film director, spokesperson, and author who is featured in the 2004 Sundance award winning documentary The Corporation and its 2020 sequel The New Corporation: The Unfortunately Necessary Sequel.

== Early life and background ==
Barrett grew up in Haddonfield, New Jersey, and graduated 2001 from Haddonfield Memorial High School in 2001. Barrett attended Pepperdine University.

== Career ==
=== First corporately sponsored college student ===
Barrett launched his entrepreneurial career in high school, during a national search for a corporation to sponsor his college education. In exchange for college tuition, Barrett was willing to be a company's “spokesguy” and wear clothes with the sponsors' logo on them. The inspiration for this came after Chris saw a TV commercial featuring professional golfer and Nike spokesperson Tiger Woods wearing a Nike logo on his hat.

Barrett became the first corporately sponsored college student, when he was named a financial responsibility spokesperson for the credit card company First USA, which was owned by BankOne. The corporate sponsorship announcement happened on NBC's The Today Show in June 2001.

=== Powerhouse Pictures ===
In 2006, Barrett co-founded Powerhouse Pictures with actor Efren Ramirez, where he directed the documentary After School, about teacher-student sex scandals, which was announced on CNN's Larry King Live.

=== Chainlink Labs ===
In 2017, Barrett began working on Chainlink, a decentralized oracle network, and currently serves as Director of Communications at Chainlink Labs.

== Political career ==
=== Grassroots for Sanders ===
In 2015, Barrett co-founded #BernItForward, a web app where you would donate $3 on behalf of three friends to the 2016 Bernie Sanders Presidential campaign. He then joined Grassroots for Sanders as an assistant fundraising manager, the organization behind the subreddit r/SandersForPresident, where he helped raise $10 million directly to the 2016 Sanders campaign.

=== Elected to office ===
Inspired by Bernie Sanders' progressive politics, Barrett joined the Collingswood, New Jersey, democratic ticket in 2017 and was elected to the Camden County Democratic Committee. While elected to office, Barrett worked with the Democratic party to make the voice of younger, more progressive, voters heard within the New Jersey Democratic Party. Barrett is an advocate for legalizing marijuana and social justice reform, eliminating student loan debt, and gun control.

== The Corporation ==
Barrett was featured in Sundance Film Festival award winning documentary film The Corporation is a 2003 Canadian documentary film written by University of British Columbia law professor Joel Bakan, and directed by Mark Achbar and Jennifer Abbott. The documentary examines the modern-day corporation. Barrett was interviewed to discuss being the first corporately sponsored college student.

Barrett was also featured in the 2020 sequel, The New Corporation: The Unfortunately Necessary Sequel, a Canadian documentary film, directed by Joel Bakan and Jennifer Abbott that premiered at the 2020 Toronto International Film Festival. The film profiles new developments in the political and social power of corporations since the release of the original. After 17 years, Chris Barrett returned in the sequel to share his transformation from being the first corporately sponsored college student to pay for his college education to now being a Bernie Sanders-inspired progressive grassroots politician. The film also showcases Barrett's run for political office in New Jersey and becoming an elected official.

Documentary appearances
Year	Title	Role	Ref
2003	The Corporation	Himself	
2006	Maxed Out	Himself	
2020	The New Corporation	Himself	

== Direct Your Own Life ==
Barrett is co-author of the non-fiction business book Direct Your Own Life: How to be a Star in Any Field Your Choose, published by Kaplan Publishing (ISBN 9781427797667).

Barrett and Napoleon Dynamite actor Efren Ramirez co-authored the book aimed at encouraging readers to achieve their life goals.
