= Politico-media complex =

Media's relationship with the ruling class

The politico-media complex (PMC, also referred to as the political-media complex) is a name given to the network of relationships between a state's political and ruling classes and its media industry. It may also encompass other interest groups, such as law (and its enforcement), corporations and multinationals. The term PMC is used as a pejorative, to refer to the collusion between governments, individual politicians, and the media industry.

== Early media institutions ==
Before Johannes Gutenberg introduced movable type to Europe in 1450, most information was delivered by town criers, ministers from the pulpit, or bartenders. Town criers spread information and news including royal edicts, police regulations, important community events and war news. These early methods of communication were often delivered by messengers on foot and could be easily controlled by the ruling class. With the invention of the printing press, written news began to spread. Corantos, which were semi-regular pamphlets that reported the news, are an example of the early politico-media complex. Popular in England, corantos reported mostly foreign news as the royal government attempted to control what domestic news reached the masses. Corantos eventually would become regular periodicals that were subject to less political control and mark one of the earlier forms of industrialized media.

== Print ==
=== Global print media ===
The Universal Declaration of Human Rights states: "Everyone has the right to freedom of opinion and expression; this right includes freedom to hold opinions without interference and impart information and ideas through any media regardless of frontiers".

Although print media in the West has suffered from declining advertising trends, many newspapers and magazines in the Middle East continue to publish well. For countries in which the majority of the population does not have easy access to the Internet or television, newspapers and magazines are some ways to get the news. However, the independence from political influence and dependability of newsprint is questionable in many countries. The Reporters Without Borders Press Freedom Index, an index measuring the amount of press freedom in the world implies that in Western first world countries, the rights of the press are not fully respected, and that the press is not completely free to investigate or criticize the government. However, the index also reports the situation is worse in politically unstable nations.

==== The West ====
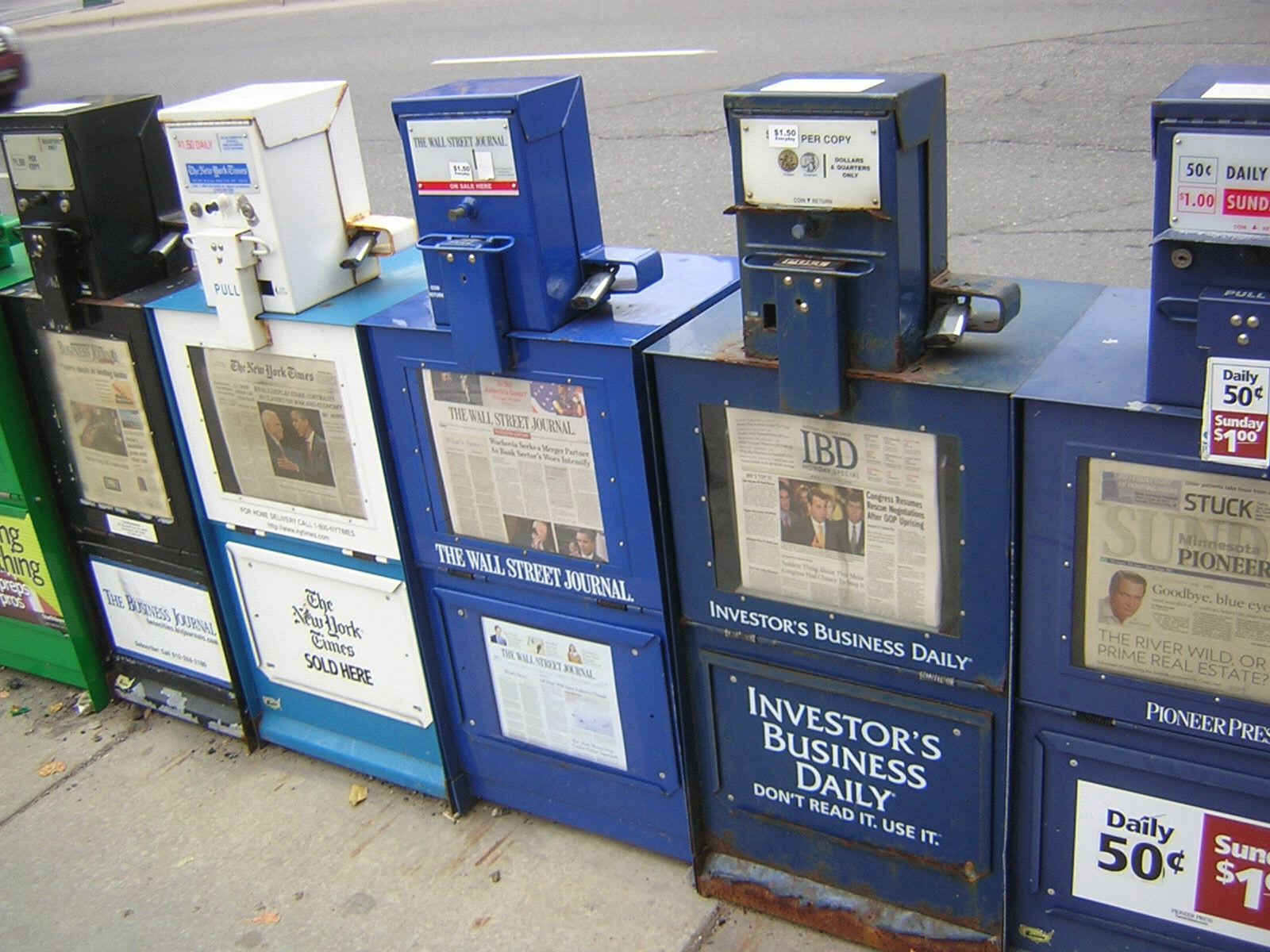
Newspapers, as seen here, are easily available in many parts of the world.

Newspapers and magazines open two-way dialogues between readers and journalists. Some studies have shown that the print media are more likely to reinforce existing political attitudes of the masses than change them.

Reporters Without Borders, an international non-governmental organization that promotes freedom of the press, produces an annual Press Freedom Index assessing countries' press freedom. Reporters Without Borders secretary-general Jean-François Julliard said at the release of the 2009 Press Freedom Index: "It is disturbing to see European democracies such as France, Italy and Slovakia fall steadily in the rankings year after year [...] Europe should be setting an example as regards civil liberties. How can you condemn human rights violations abroad if you do not behave irreproachably at home? The Obama effect, which has enabled the United States to recover 16 places in the index, is not enough to reassure us."

==== Asia ====
The press is censored in the People's Republic of China through the Golden Shield Project known worldwide as the Great Firewall of China. Reporters Without Borders ranks China's press situation as "very serious," the worst possible ranking on their five-point scale. China's press was ranked 173rd out of 179 countries in the 2013 World Press Freedom Index. The Chinese government maintains the legal authority to censor the press, and in defense of censorship, claims that the Chinese Communist Party has the most freedom of the press since there is no wealthy minority controlling it. In the 2020 World Press Freedom Index, China dropped 5 places to 177.

==== The Middle East and North Africa ====
Middle Eastern print media is mainly paid for by private funders, either a specific family or specific government party. Some Middle Eastern newspapers and magazines have been accused of having obvious political ties. Many countries in the Middle East and Africa have harsh government restrictions concerning what can be published. Restricting rationales may include politics or economics. Iran, ranked 174 out of 179 in 2013, is described as highly censored, as the Iranian government maintains strict control over much of the print and broadcast media and news websites. Reporters Without Borders has said that journalists in Israel "enjoy real freedom of expression despite the existence of military censorship." However, Professor Yoram Peri of the University of Maryland has said that Israel experienced a media control crackdown as the government censors coverage of military action coverage, displaying how governments often limit press freedom during times of war. According to Reporters Without Borders in 2009, Eritrea in Northern Africa is the worst ranked country for journalistic freedom. Eritrea is currently a one-party "transitional government" which has yet to enact its ratified constitution. Other African countries at the bottom of the 2009 Press Freedom Index include Syria (165) and Somalia (164). Both countries exhibit little journalistic freedom and are infamous for their unstable transitional governments and near constant warfare.

=== Struggles ===
Where newspapers used to represent an exclusive connection between readers and advertisers, print media now competes with the power of the Internet. Because of declining advertising revenue and shrinking audiences, print press has been described as declining. Today a little more than half of Americans read a newspaper every day. However, a 2004 report notes that 55 million newspapers are sold daily in the United States, and newsprint still plays a significant role in the politico-media complex.

In addition to economic struggles and readership decline, newsprint has also struggled with losing readers' trust. Surveys have found that people tend to trust newspapers less than other news media, in part because they believe that newspaper journalists are "isolated and out of touch" and motivated by commercial interests. Most people believe their local and national news television stations more than their local and national newspapers. The only news medium that people trust less than newspapers is print magazines.

Some old people out there have speculated that the youth today are more visually inclined, and are therefore less likely to be influenced by written political news or propaganda. One Pew Center study found that 28% of the younger generations such as Gen Z or Gen Y read the paper in a day, and average only 10 minutes of reading time. Harvard Professor Thomas Patterson said: "What's happened over time is that we have become more of a viewing nation than a reading nation, and the internet is a little of both. My sense is that, like it or not, the future of news is going to be in the electronic media, but we don't know what that form is going to look like."

== Radio ==
=== History of political radio ===
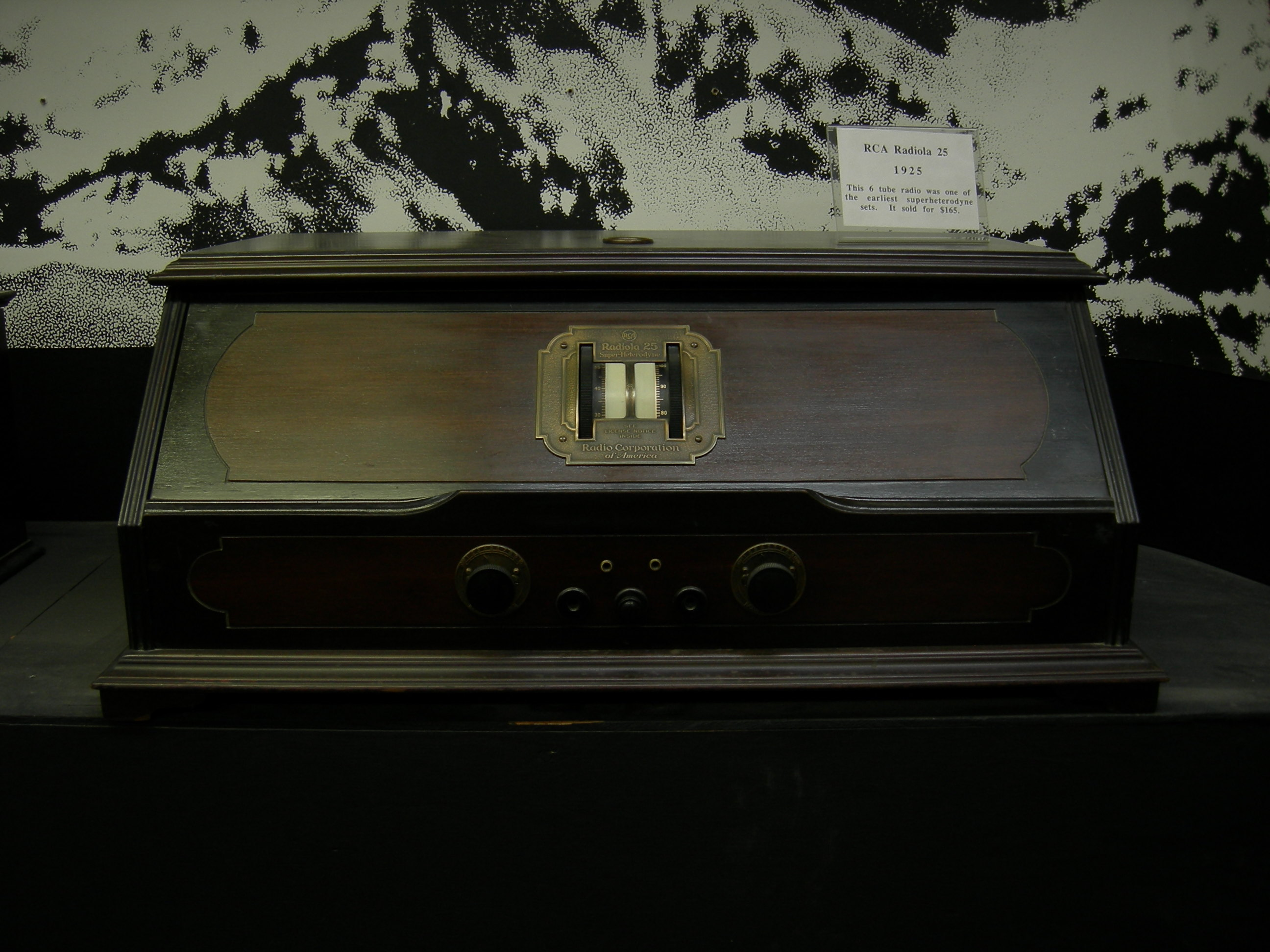
An RCA Radiola, manufactured 1925

The early American radio industry was composed of commercial shipping companies that used radio for navigation, and amateur radio enthusiasts who built radios at home. This mixture of military, industry, and community went unregulated until the Radio Act of 1912, which required all ships to use radio communication and keep a constant radio watch, amateur users to be licensed, and began regulating the use of wavelengths for radio transmissions. This act represents one of the earliest interactions between the government and the radio media and also set a precedent for later radio legislation, including the Radio Act of 1927, which established the Federal Radio Commission and added further regulation to radio users, both commercial and amateur. Government regulation increased again with the American entrance into World War I, when President Woodrow Wilson ordered naval control of all radio stations and ordered that amateurs cease all radio activity. Jonathan Reed Winkler, a noted WWI historian, said: “It was only during World War I that the United States first came to comprehend how a strategic communications network-the collection of submarine telegraph cables, and long-distance radio stations used by a nation for diplomatic, commercial and military purposes- was vital to the global political and economic interests of a great power in the modern world.”

After World War I, radio was introduced to broader civilian audiences when Westinghouse released the Aeriola Jr. in 1919, and the Radio Corporation of America (RCA) released the Radiola in 1920. The Aeriola Jr. and Radiola helped established a new channel for the politico-media complex to enter into thousands of American homes. By 1919 the oldest licensed American radio station, KDKA, from Pittsburgh, PA began broadcasting regular music shows, and soon music, educational programming, sports coverage and eventually news coverage became popular. Coverage of politics quickly caught on across the countries as stations began covering elections and reporting news of government actions. The close politico-media complex between government and radio was evident in 1924 when the Republican and Democratic National Conventions were covered, while the conventions of the other parties were ignored. Candidates made the eve of election speeches, the first instance of radio broadcasting that was meant to affect the American political process. Progressive candidate Robert Lafollette claimed that the "radio trust" had undermined his campaign.

The numbers of radio users exploded. By 1935 about 2 in 3 American homes owned a radio. Politicians would continue to use the radio in World War II, in which the radio was used primarily for news transmissions and the spread of propaganda. One example of radio propaganda came from Iva Toguri D'Aquino, Ruth Hayakawa, June Suyamawho, and Myrtle Lipton collectively known as Tokyo Rose. These women hosted anti-American programming intended to lower American soldiers' morale and illustrate the use of governments' use of the media to influence the public or their enemies. However, many people, such as Iva Toguri D'Aquino and Allied prisoners of war, were forced against their will to participate in these programs and worked hard to help Allied forces.

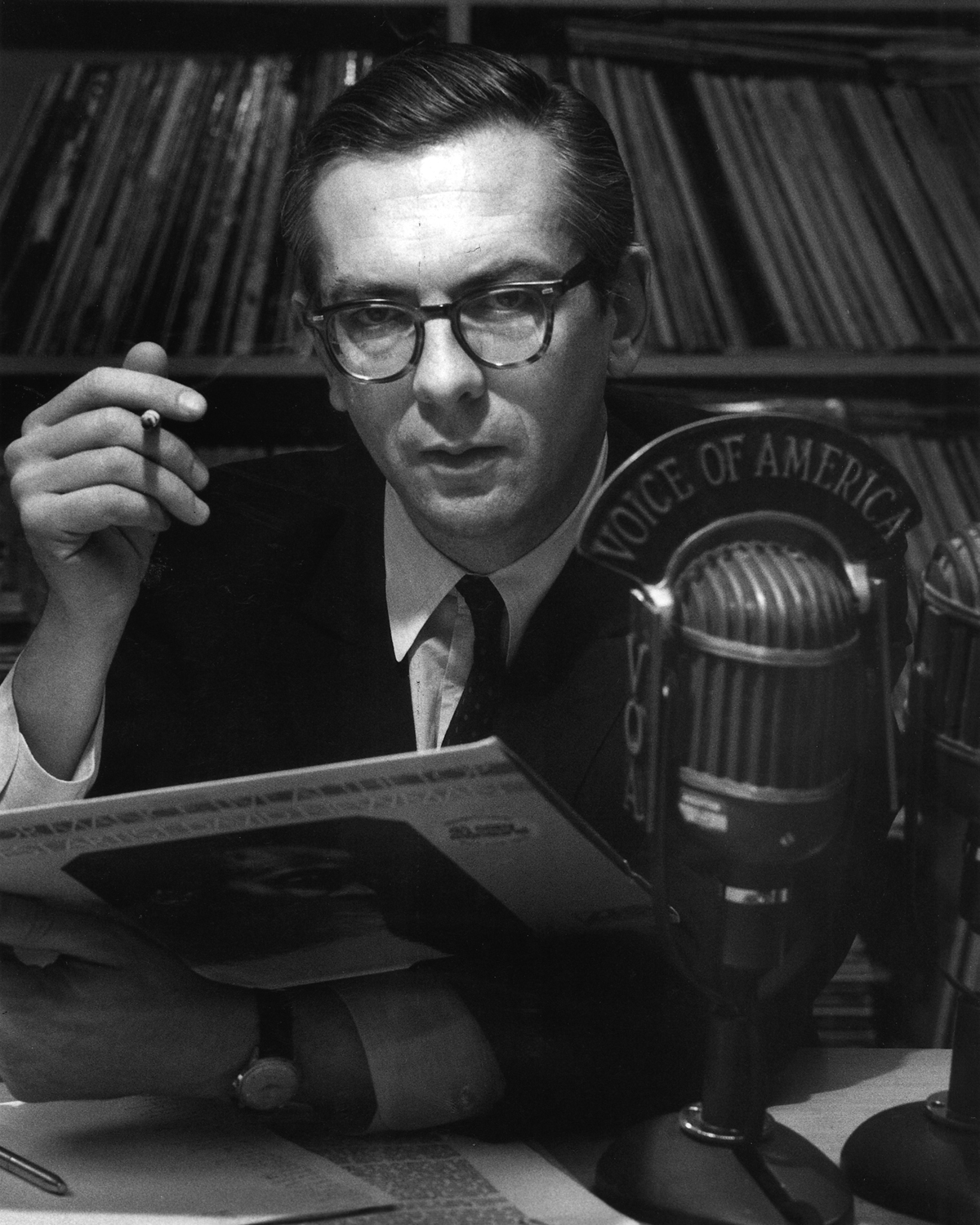
Willis Conover, host of the VOA's Music USA program, 1969

After WWII and throughout the Cold War era, Democratic nations used long-range radio waves to broadcast news into countries behind the Iron Curtain or otherwise information-compromised nations. The American international radio program, the Voice of America, founded during World War II, became a critical part of the Cold War era "public diplomacy," which aimed to spread democratic values and popularize American policies abroad. In 1950, President Harry S. Truman described the Cold War conflict as a "struggle, above all else, for the minds of men," which the American people would win by getting "the real story across to people in other countries"; in other words, by embracing the politico-media complex and using it to influence foreign listeners. The Voice of America (VOA), which operated under the authority of the United States Information Agency, supported programming in forty-five languages and broadcast over 400 hours of programming a week. Programming included unbiased news coverage, musical programs, and Special English broadcasts, which was intended to help listeners master American English. The VOA was not alone in its international broadcasting efforts, the United States Central Intelligence Agency supported Radio Free Europe and Radio Liberty, both propagandist radio networks intended to incite dissent against Communism. Other nations also used international radio as propaganda. For example, Deutsche Welle (DW), the German international radio program was a major broadcaster during the Cold War. By 1965 DW aired 848 hours of programming to the Soviet Union and abroad and reached 5% of the USSR population weekly by 1980. Deutsche Welle's mission to “promote understanding of Germany as an independent nation with its roots in European culture and as a liberal, democratic, constitutional state based on the rule of law.” illustrates German use of the politico-media complex.

=== Modern political radio ===
The Golden Age of Radio may have only lasted from 1935 to 1950, yet radio is still an active medium in the politico-media complex. Today there is extensive radio programming on politics. An example is the Rush Limbaugh Show, which broadcast the political commentary of late Rush Limbaugh, referred to by listeners as "America's Truth Detector," the "Doctor of Democracy," and the "Most Dangerous Man in America". The Rush Limbaugh Show has hosted numerous politicians, illustrating that politicians still use the radio to affect public opinion and the political process. The now defunct Air America Media company provided progressive political commentary and news coverage and described itself as the "most recognized progressive talk radio network, providing an independent and unfiltered voice to a grateful listening nation". Air America programs such as The Rachel Maddow Show, The Lionel Show, and Live in Washington with Jack Rice discussed recordings of politicians, hosted politicians as live guests, and acted as a connection between the political classes and the media.

== Film ==
=== National cinema ===
One of the film's most powerful forms is national cinema, for which there are entire books for individual countries and varying definitions. Through the cinema, ideological groups within specific countries can construct and reinforce their collective identities through film, as well as the identities of what is considered a foreigner through propaganda.

=== Cultural politics ===
Ulf Hedetoft said that "in the real world of politics and influence, certain nationalisms, cultures, ideas, and interpretations are more powerful, assertive and successful than others. Where the less influential ones are not necessarily less self-congratulatory, they are certainly more inward-looking and always carry the label of national specificity". He also said that the same films actually become de-nationalized as a result of its "national-cultural currency" more widely and easily dispersed, mixing with other cultures, becoming either a "positive admixture" to other countries' cultures and identities or a "model for emulation." He compares national cinema that undergoes such processes to English becoming a global lingua Franca: the cultural sharing that results is hegemonic and the globalizing process is non-symmetrical.

=== Propaganda ===
Propaganda is a way that politics can be represented and manipulated in film. Russian producers Sergei Eisenstein and Vsevolod Pudovkin are credited with the birth of propaganda aesthetics, for which the underlying assumption was that by manipulating cinematic images representing reality, they could manipulate spectators' concepts of reality. Documentaries can be an even more effective form of propaganda than other genre films because the form of representation claims to mirror reality, making obfuscation of brainwashing an audience easier.

British newsreels such as The Battle of the Somme of World War I were propaganda because they only showed the war from their own perspective, though it can be argued as being more honest and objective than more recent war documentaries (for they were edited without adjustments for dramatic or epic effect). Their photographers remained on their front lines which presented at least some truth. According to Furhammar and Isaksson, it was Russian filmmakers who were the "masters of montage" and discovered film's power to create the convincing illusion with cutting, rhythmic editing, and a didactic approach.

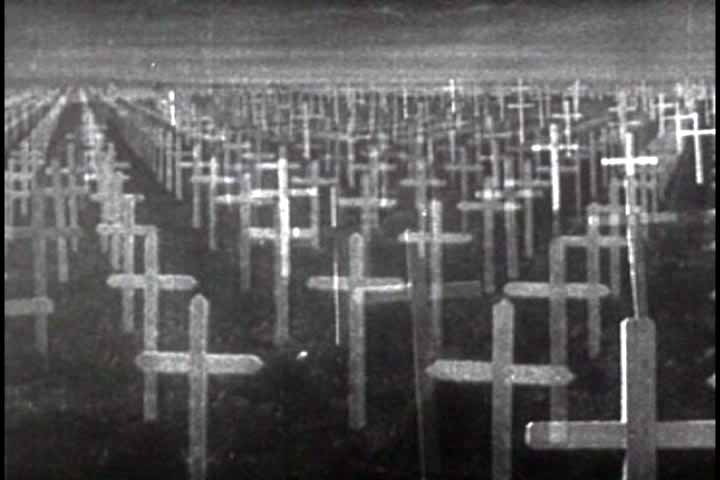
A scene from "Divide and Conquer", the third installment of Why We Fight, 1943

When sound became possible, documentaries have been said to become more politically powerful with the use of speakers' voices and music. In Nazi Germany, newsreels were just as important as feature films, while in Fascist Italy propaganda was mostly limited to documentaries. A comparison of the first three installments of the American series Why We Fight and the Nazi documentary Sieg im Westen (Victory in the West) demonstrates how convincing even two opposing interpretations of the same events can be. The first covers years in a couple of hours but its density disguises any omission of truth while the latter manages to depict war with real images but without blood or death. The same is found in documentaries about the Spanish Civil War.

Falsification of political matter in documentaries can be created by lifting shots of events other than the one being dealt with and including them in the film so that they appear to be a part of the "reality" it claims to represent. The House Committee on Un-American Activities, for example, did this with Operation Abolition in 1960 and Nazi newsreels depicted scenes of the Allies' defeat at Dieppe as real scenes from the Normandy invasion just a few days afterward to convince the audience of the Reich's success. The audience's political affiliations can also be manipulated by actually staging the ostensibly real events as the 1944 Nazi picture The Führer Gives the Jews a Town did.

World War II propaganda persisted 30 years after Dachau and Auschwitz such as in the thinly disguised fascist Italian film The Night Porter (1974). The film sought to legitimize the Nazis' genocide while glorifying sadism, brutality, and machismo. What amazes Henry Giroux, as he explains in "Breaking into the Movies", is that such blatant ideological messages were ignored by critics and the general public, and that society may be incapable of testing the present against the past has implications for post-industrial oppression in the West and the strategies for resisting it. Despite the writings of Antonio Gramsci, Herbert Marcuse, and Paulo Freire, the majority of Americans do not recognize how important class hegemony, or cultural domination, is in nations where populations are kept obedient to governments through ideological means. He argues that "[w]e are not only victims in the political and material sense, but are also tied emotionally and intellectually to the prevailing ruling-class norms and values."

Though feature forms of propaganda lack documentaries' ostensible authenticity they can retain political power because directors' resources are less limited and they can create the reality of the film. They further compensate for lack of credibility with intensity.

=== Anti-politics in film ===
Despite the strong patriotism and nationalism of Americans, overtly political films have never been well received in the U.S. while films that have represented politics inconspicuously (such as in the form of propaganda) have remained popular. Besides Frank Capra, no other major American filmmaker has seriously presented central themes of citizenship, participation, and responsibility in civic life amidst the complexities and corruption of the political world. While Capra sought to "develop a positive American cinematic vocabulary for political action" of the individual, as Charles Lindholm and John A. Hall describe, he ultimately failed.

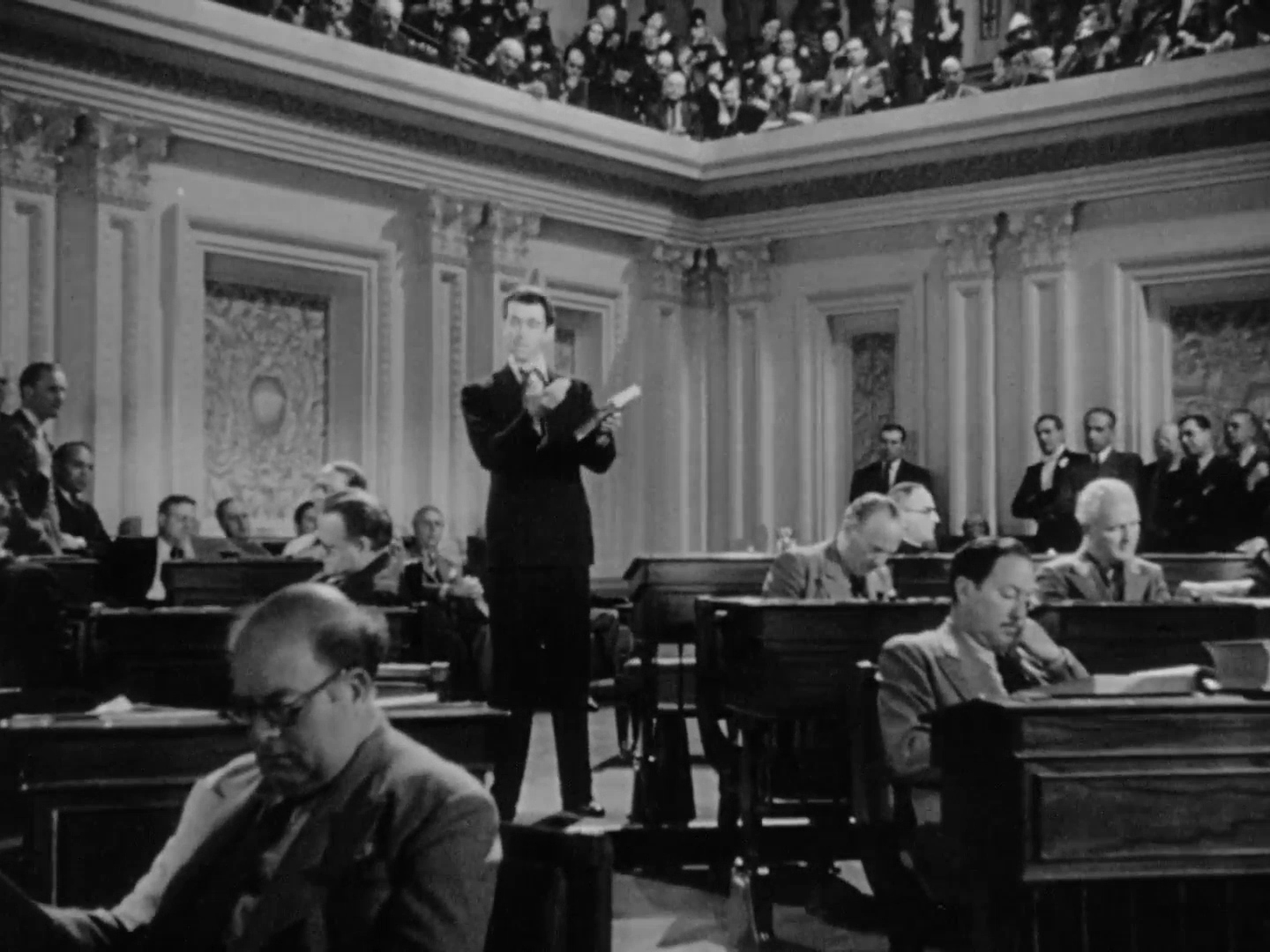
A scene from Capra's Mr. Smith Goes to Washington, 1939

Capra's films are characterized by the same basic formula according to which the fundamental American values of fairness and honesty are challenged by the corruption and cruelty of politics. Ronald Reagan later extensively quoted the speech made by Mr. Deeds in Mr. Deeds Goes to Town (1936) where he expresses his disgust with the complexities of politics and calls for individual goodness. In his next film Mr. Smith Goes to Washington, (1939) Capra reinforces the integrity and decency of the everyman who can transcend politics despite the power and crookedness of special interest groups. After the hero of Meet John Doe realizes his need for others, he discovers and attempts to expose a fascist bidder for presidency planning to take advantage of his club support. He fails in the midst of a violent mob with the depressing conclusion that the American public is a credulous crowd that is susceptible to manipulation until the John Doe club members come begging his forgiveness and convince him to return to lead them.

The ending of John Doe was unsuccessful amongst audiences and critics, discouraging any more political films for Capra and no films of merit after It's a Wonderful Life. Capra's ultimate fall from filmmaking and his advice that all American filmmakers should forget politics if they do not want to cut themselves in half signify the challenge filmmakers face when they attempt to criticize politics. Lindholm and Hall observe that "the problems that defeated Capra has also undercut later attempts by American filmmakers to portray the complex relationship between individualism and citizenship in the United States" and claim that Hollywood has instead adopted the paranoia of politics that Capra had tried to overcome. Consequently, political films in the U.S. have followed a trend of focusing on the flawed character of leaders, such films like Citizen Kane (1940) and Nixon (1995). Otherwise, they show the corruption of power, such as in The Candidate (1972) and Primary Colors (1998). Other films, like A Face in a Crowd (1957) and All the King's Men (1949), follow the warning of John Doe. JFK (1991) and The Manchurian Candidate (1962), on the other hand, are based on the premise that democracy is an illusion and Americans are the ignorant pawns of various conspiracies involving, for example, the collusion between the government and the media.

=== The depoliticizing effect of cinema ===
While films can be overtly political they can also depoliticize and oversimplify what is inherently complex, such as class struggle. Film, as it contributes to mass culture, has been criticized for reducing the concept of class to stereotypes and predictable formulas that promote superficial understandings of ideology. Such misrepresentation and the ignorance that it promotes and perpetuates has been said to make audiences and citizens vulnerable to manipulative tactics of politicians in a complex reality. One of the exceptions to oversimplification and ideological flattening in cinema has been said to be Norma Rae (1979), a film that presents a truer representation than is conventional of the complexities and politics of the working-class struggle and culture at the level of everyday life.

== Television ==
=== Role of television in United States presidential elections ===
While the mass media have long influenced the political process, the introduction of the television marked a significant shift. As a primary medium through which voters obtain information on candidates and the news in general, television beame a prominent channel for political groups to influence the public.

This transformation started in the early 1960s when newscast programs were extended to thirty-minute programs, which allowed for greater news coverage and capacity. This expanded time slot also allowed more focus to be given to presidential candidates, and network news soon became the center of national politics coverage. Because newscasts were national, aired political campaigns were able to impact viewers across the country and spread influence nationwide.

Rick Shenkman analyzes the media's impact on politics in his book, Just How Stupid Are We?: Facing the Truth About the American Voter, and observes that American voters have gained significant political power over the last 50 years, though they are more vulnerable to manipulation as their knowledge of politics and world affairs have decreased. He also claims that "politicians have repeatedly misled voters" by "dumbing down of American politics via marketing, spin machines, and misinformation".

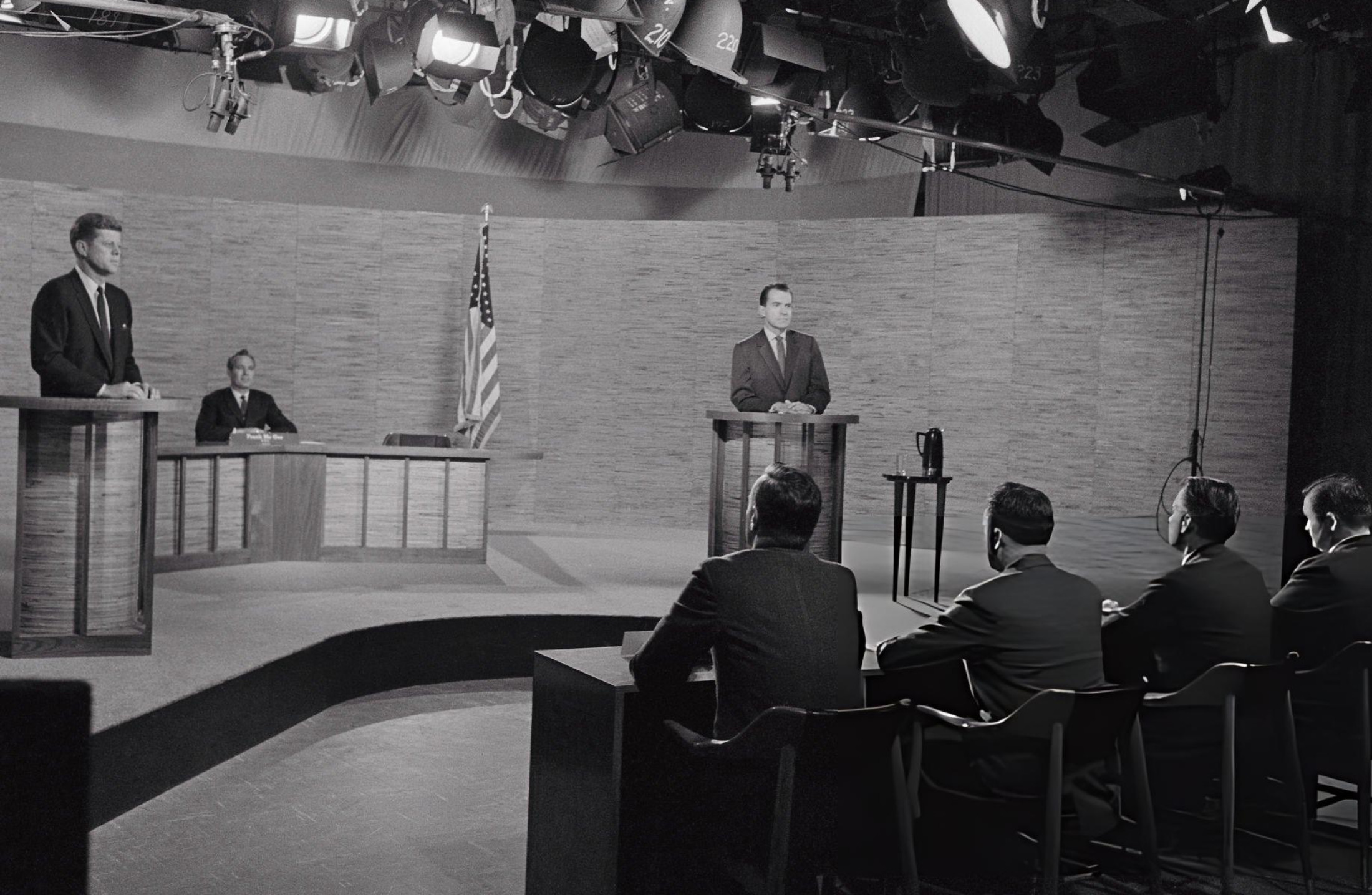
John F. Kennedy and Richard Nixon in the first televised presidential candidates' debate, 1960

By prioritizing news stories, the news media play a significant role in determining the nation's political reality; they provide the political information that will be regarded as fact and indicate to viewers how much importance to attach to each topic according to how much air time they dedicate to a given issue and the emphasis they place on it. For example, television news can offer cues on topic salience by deciding what the opening story on the newscast will be or by altering the length of time devoted a story. When these cues are repeated broadcast after broadcast, day after day, they may be able to effectively communicate the amount of importance broadcasters want each topic to have.

=== Political influence on religion via television ===
In his book, Politics After Television: Religious Nationalism and the Reshaping of the Public in India, Arvind Rajagopal examines Hindu nationalism during the late 1980s and 1990s in India. Rajagopal analyzed the role of the media in the public's construction of national, cultural, class, and regional identity. More specifically, he studied the hegemonic role of the Ram Janmabhumi movement and how the Ram project played out on Indian national television. In his study, Rajagopal found that the Ram project played a role in "shaping discourses about national and cultural identities through the 1990s to the present" in India.

Rajagopal investigated the cultural and political economy of television in contemporary India. His discussion of television revolves around the industrial and cultural politics of the serialized epic Ramayan. The serial epic, which generated unprecedented viewership, is based on the epic story of the Hindu god Ram and aired on Doordarshan, India's state-run television. Rajagopal argued that the national telecast of the Hindu religious epic Ramayan during the late 1980s provided much of the ideological groundwork for the launch of the Ram Janmabhumi movement and that "television profoundly changes the context of politics".^{(p. 24)}

The epic was broadcast on national television and sponsored by the ruling Congress government. Rajagopal argued that Congress assumed that the mere sponsorship of the epic would aid its electoral future by bringing in the majority Hindu vote. On the contrary, it was the electorally weak Hindu nationalist political body, the Bharatiya Janata Party (BJP), that benefited from the serial's popularity. The BJP did so by avoiding the media effects framework attempted by Congress and articulated a complex relationship between the televised Hindu epic and its own Hindu nationalist beliefs instead. The BJP mobilized the public around the symbol of Ram, the lead figure of the serial, but strategically reworked the symbol via the Ram Janmabhumi movement to emphasize cultural authenticity, national belonging, and a renewed sense of national purpose and direction. Articulating the temple restoration project within its electoral promise, the BJP, not surprisingly, went on to form the national government in the next general election,^{p. 43} illustrating that, as Rajagopal argues, television is capable of profoundly impacting politics.

Central to the BJP's success was the party's strategic use of both the media and the market by creating merchandise such as stickers, buttons, and audiotapes centering on the key figure of the Ram. Rajagopal observed that the televised epic also dealt with the tension between the past and the present at many levels, which can be seen in the reworking of the epic to fit the conventions of modern commercial television. In addition, the epic was introduced and ended with twenty minutes of advertising, which helped the serial to reconstruct the past through technologies of the present.

=== Television and politics around the world ===
In the “Dramas of Nationhood: The Politics of Television in Egypt,” Lila Abu-Lughod suggested that a nation's television should be studied to answer larger questions about the culture, power, and modern self-fashioning of that nation. Abu-Lughod focuses on Egypt and investigates the elements of developmentalist ideology and the dreams of national progress that dominated Egyptian television in the past. She analyzed the nation's television broadcasts and highlighted the attempt to depict the authentic national culture and the intentional strategies for fighting religious extremism.

Abu-Lughod discovered that the main cultural form that binds Egypt together is television serials. They are melodramatic programs akin to American soap operas but more closely tied to political and social issues than their Western counterparts. Their contents reflect the changing dynamics of Islam, gender relations, and everyday life in the Middle Eastern nation of Egypt, while at the same time trying to influence and direct these changes.

Another group who studied the impact of television on politics included Holli Semetko and Patti Valkenburg. In their studies, they analyzed the framing of press and television news in European politics. For reader clarification, they provided the best working definitions of news frames as defined from a wide range of sources. News frames are "conceptual tools which media and individuals rely on to convey, interpret and evaluate information", which set the parameters "in which citizens discuss public events" and are in a mode of "persistent selection, emphasis, and exclusion". Framing is selecting "some aspects of a perceived reality" to enhance their salience "in such a way as to promote a particular problem definition, causal interpretation, moral evaluation, and/or treatment recommendation". Frames help audiences "locate, perceive, identify, and label" the flow of information around them and to "narrow the available political alternatives."

News frames utilize the framing effect, or when relevant attributes of a message – such as its organization, content, or structure – make "particular thoughts applicable, resulting in their activation and use in evaluations." The framing effect has shown to have large effects on people's perceptions and has also been shown to shape public perceptions of political issues or institutions.

Like agenda-setting research, framing analysis focuses on the relationship between public policy issues in the news and the public perceptions of these issues. However, framing analysis "expands beyond agenda-setting research into what people talk or think about by examining how they think and talk about issues in the news." The results of Semetko and Valkenburg's research indicate that the attribution of responsibility frame was most commonly employed by the news, which focuses on making viewers feel a sense of obligation to perform whatever duties are attached to the given role and feel a sense of moral accountability for not taking on the role.

== Internet ==
=== Impact on political media ===
The Internet has given the world a tool for education, communication, and negotiation in political information and political roles and its use by individuals and organizations has increased and continues to significantly increase. This rapid increase can be compared to the boom of the television and its impact on politics as a form of media. The Internet opens up a world of commentary and criticism which in turn allows for new and better ideas to circulate amongst many people. It gives multidirectional communication, which allows people to stay connected with organizations or people associated with politics more easily. However, there are many controversies regarding the PMC in the medium as the Internet can encourage and facilitate the practice of providing bits of information extracted from a far wider context or biased information, which leads to public cynicism toward the media.

The relative ease of entry into publishing through Internet/Web channels gives opportunities to become one-person contributors or players in the PMC

For example, Wikipedia is a major global channel and is currently the thirteenth most visited website in the world. In 2009 it found its objectivity being compromised at the highest levels with a member sitting on the influential Arbitration Committee (ArbCom) who had an undisclosed conflict of interest. It was revealed that David Boothroyd - a serving Labour Party Councillor for Westminster City—had gained a seat on the Arbitration Committee under the pseudonym of "Sam Blacketer" and also went on to make controversial edits to the Wikipedia entry on the then Leader of the Opposition, later Conservative Prime Minister of the United Kingdom, David Cameron. Boothroyd was also found to have operated prior his appointment to the Arbitration Committee other contemporary accounts—a practice in Wikipedia known as 'sock puppetry'—to give undue weight through appearing as different identities to a particular point of view as opposed to representing a neutral point of view (NPOV). Given Wikipedia's presence and influence in the world, the "affair" attracted mainstream media and other new media attention nationally and internationally, which damaged Wikipedia's standing among readers. Boothroyd was forced to step down from the Arbitration Committee, although he claimed he had already asserted his intention to resign.

The impact of the internet on politics has been notable, as this form of media has more current information than others as it is constantly being updated. Another advantage is its capacity to have extensive information in one place, like voting records, periodicals, press releases, opinion polls, policy statements, speeches, etc. Obtaining a comprehensive understanding of an election, for example, is more convenient than it has been in the past. Political information available on the internet covers every major activity of American politics. Users, nonetheless, remain susceptible to bias, especially on websites that represent themselves as objective sources.

Bill Clinton was the first U.S. President to utilize the Internet in a national campaign and to appoint a Director of Email and Electronic Publishing.

Email is heavily used among numerous levels of government, political groups, and even media companies as a means of communicating with the public which plays a significant role in the political-media complex. The popularity of e-mail hit the Internet and the public in the mid-1990s as a way to stay in touch with family and friends. In 1993 the United States Congress and the White House began using it for internal communication and as a means of communicating with the general public. During the Clinton administration, a director for email and electronic publishing was appointed and by the summer of 1993, the White House was receiving 800 emails per day. In order to deal with the influx of e-mail, a more sophisticated system was put in. In a six-month period, at one point, there were half a million emails sent to the president and vice president.

=== Elections ===
The United States Presidential campaign in 1996 between sitting-President Bill Clinton and Bob Dole was one of the first campaigns to utilize the internet on a national level in the US.

With the internet, campaigns can raise a significant amounts of money in a shorter period of time compared to other methods. Email also offers a low-cost way of reaching voters.

During the 2008 United States Presidential election between John McCain and Barack Obama, the internet was extensively utilized by both candidates. Facebook was heavily used to give people the ability to support their views and share information with their friends. Both sent out messages daily to promote themselves and the issues at hand, for leverage against the other candidate.

=== Discussion forums and blogs ===
Blogs are a type of website, usually maintained by an individual with regular entries of commentary, descriptions of events, or other material such as graphics or video. Blogging started to become popular in the early 2000s and was used mostly by highly educated, highly paid, males. Around 2004 blogging became more mainstream and was typically used for political interaction.

The Internet creates a space in which people can voice their opinions and discuss political issues under the protection of anonymity. Some discussion forums are actually groups or organizations that set up a discussion for a specific purpose about one issue or person in politics. Some problems with discussion forums include the lack of personal contact, which allows people not to take responsibility for posts, such as personal attacks on others. Bias is another issue of online discussion forums because many websites attract like-minded individuals, making it less likely for alternative perspectives to be introduced.

=== Electronic government ===
An e-Government is a government that is inter-networked through digital technology for mass media distribution and communication for voters, taxpayers, schools, hospitals, etc. It has been described as a new way to transform government programs by closing the gap between distance and time. This idea has been said to be a more cost effective and convenient way to form programs around the needs of citizens rather than civil servants.

== UK media phone hacking scandal ==
The first major reappraisal of the relationship between a political elite/class and the media in a major modern Western PMC, with respect to the decline of representative political and legal processes and the consequent erosion of and dangers to the public interest in a Western democracy, is captured in excerpts from three contributions to an emergency three-hour debate conducted by members of parliament (MPs) in the Parliament of the United Kingdom on the afternoon of the 6 July 2011.

We, politicians, have colluded for far too long with the media: we rely on them, we seek their favour, and we live and we die politically because of what they write and what they show, and sometimes that means we lack the courage or the spine to stand up when wrong has occurred.

— House of Commons Hansard Debates for 06 July 2011, Phone Hacking Chris Bryant, MP. Column 1540 Emergency debate under the Standing Order No. 24.

As MPs, we depend on the media. We like to be liked by them; we need to be liked by them. We depend on the media, and that applies still more to Governments. It is an unavoidable observation that Parliament has behaved with extraordinary cowardice for many years...

— House of Commons Hansard Debates for 06 July 2011, Phone Hacking Zac Goldsmith, MP. Column 1569 Emergency debate under the Standing Order No. 24.

We are faced with a scandal of expanding proportions, including hacking, allegations of interference in police investigations, and claims that payments have been made to officers. To restore faith and trust in the police and the media, we must lock up the guilty, establish a statutory inquiry, shine a cleansing light on the culture of the media and, if necessary, of the police, and implement the reforms necessary to ensure that the privacy of victims and citizens is never intruded on again. It is clear from today’s debate that this is the will of the House, and we are committed to making it happen.

— House of Commons Hansard Debates for 06 July 2011, Phone Hacking Tom Brake, MP. Column 1580 Emergency debate under the Standing Order No. 24.

These comments refer to the apparent effects of the relationships between the members of (the UK) parliament and those that form the UK Government, the Metropolitan Police and News International (NI [UK subsidiary of News Corporation ]) and the influence of the latter organization on the former two institutions.

The debate was precipitated by some of the information procurement methods found to have been used by the now-defunct major British Sunday newspaper News of the World, which was owned by NI.

The Parliamentary turmoil resulted in the UK government instituting a three-pronged public judicial examination known as the Leveson Inquiry into the relations and interactions between the media and the public, the media and the police and the media and the politicians. Its findings were published November 29, 2012 based on an eight-month investigation (November 2011 to June 2012) that probed into the relationships. While the Leveson findings are oriented toward the PMC of the UK, some commentators argued that its findings will have global implications through their relevance to similar existing networks in other countries.

== See also ==
- List of industrial complexes
- Manufacturing Consent (disambiguation)
- Freedom of the press
- Fake news
- Godi media
- Firewall of China
- Hillsborough disaster (The Sun)
- Hillsborough Wikipedia posts
- History of radio
- KDKA (AM)
- Korean Central News Agency
- Leveson Inquiry
- Media bias in the United States
- Mediacracy
- World Press Freedom Index
- PRISM
- Postmodernism
- Post-truth politics
- Spin (propaganda)
- The New Totalitarians
