= Vince Arvidson =

Canadian cinematographer and film director

Vince Arvidson is a Canadian cinematographer and film director from Vancouver, British Columbia. He is most noted for his work on the documentary film The Magnitude of All Things, for which he was a Canadian Screen Award nominee for Best Cinematography in a Documentary at the 10th Canadian Screen Awards in 2022.

His other cinematography credits have included the films With Child, Kayak to Klemtu and Chained.

As a filmmaker, he directed the documentary film I Forgive You, My Killer, and the short film Postage.
