= Marlon Kazadi =

Canadian actor (born 2004)

- Born: Marlon S. Kazadi; November 16, 2004 (age 21)
- Occupation: Actor
- Years active: 2018–present

Marlon S. Kazadi (born November 16, 2004) is a Canadian actor. He is best known for the role of Mike Broadstreet in the film Zombie Town (2023), a zombie thriller based on a book of the same name by author R. L. Stine. Kazadi's first lead role was in the independent film Chained (2020), for which he won Best Young Actor at the New York International Film Awards, as well as nominations at the Vancouver Film Critics Circle Awards and UBCP/ACTRA Awards.

== Early life ==
Marlon S. Kazadi moved to Vancouver, British Columbia, from the Democratic Republic of the Congo at the age of 7, along with his mother, Fatima Kazadi. She later remarried to producer Kayvon Sarfehjooy. Kazadi attended French-speaking schools – École Anne Hébert and École des Pionniers, before continuing his education in English.

== Career ==
Kazadi made his acting debut at 9 years old, on the ABC series The Whispers. He decided to respond to an open call after his mother suggested that he may take a liking to acting, as she noticed his talent from him replaying movie characters that he watched as a child.

He then took a three-year hiatus from acting to pursue a career as a professional soccer player, which was his first dream. In 2018, he landed the supporting role of Omar in the film Child's Play, a remake of the original classic horror film featuring Chucky. That same year, Kazadi was cast in two series: first as Young James (Jimmy) Olsen in Supergirl, and then in a recurring role as Malcolm in Riverdale.

By the age of 15, Kazadi had landed his first lead role as Taylor in the feature film Chained (2020), a crime thriller by Titus Heckel. Kazadi was nominated for multiple awards based on his performance, and won Best Young Lead Actor in the New York International Film Awards. His work in Chained caught the eyes of various producers, which eventually landed him the lead role of Mike Broadstreet in Zombie Town, based on author R.L. Stine's book of the same name.

== Filmography ==
Film and television
Year	Title	Role	Notes
2023	Zombie Town	Mike Broadstreet	Lead actor
2021	Ghostbusters: Afterlife	Thickneck	Cameo appearance
2021	Chained	Taylor	Lead actor
2020	Christmas In Evergreen: Bells Are Ringing	David	Main cast
2019	Child's Play	Omar	Main cast
2019	Supergirl	Young James	Episode 419: "American Dreamer"
2019–2021	Riverdale	Malcolm	5 episodes
2019	Christmas In Evergreen: Tidings of Joy	David	Main cast
2018	Christmas In Evergreen: Letters to Santa	David	Main cast
2015	The Whispers	Nomad Boy	Episode 2: "Hide & Seek"

== Awards and nominations ==
Year	Award	Category	Nominated work	Result
2021	New York International Film Awards	Best Young Lead Actor	Chained	Won
2021	UBCP/ACTRA Awards, Vancouver	Best Lead Performance, Male	Chained	Nominated
2021	VFCC Awards	Best Actor in a Canadian Film	Chained	Nominated
