= The Corporation (2003 film) =

- Theatrical release poster
- Directed by: Mark Achbar; Jennifer Abbott
- Written by: Joel Bakan; Harold Crooks; Mark Achbar
- Produced by: Mark Achbar; Bart Simpson
- Narrated by: Mikela J. Mikael
- Cinematography: Mark Achbar; Rolf Cutts; Jeff Hoffman; Kirk Tougas
- Edited by: Jennifer Abbott
- Music by: Leonard J. Paul
- Production company: Big Picture Media Corporation
- Distributed by: Zeitgeist Films
- Release dates: September 10, 2003 (Toronto International Film Festival); January 16, 2004
- Running time: 145 minutes
- Country: Canada
- Language: English
- Box office: $4.84 million

The Corporation is a 2003 Canadian documentary film written by University of British Columbia law professor Joel Bakan and filmmaker Harold Crooks, and directed by Mark Achbar and Jennifer Abbott. The documentary examines the modern corporation. Bakan wrote the book The Corporation: The Pathological Pursuit of Profit and Power during the filming of the documentary.

A sequel film, The New Corporation: The Unfortunately Necessary Sequel, was released in 2020.

== Synopsis ==
The documentary shows the development of the contemporary business corporation, from a legal entity that originated as a government-chartered institution meant to affect specific public functions, to the rise of the modern commercial institution entitled to most of the legal rights of a person. The documentary concentrates mostly upon corporations in North America, especially in the United States. One theme is its assessment of corporate personhood, as a result of an 1886 case in the Supreme Court of the United States in which a statement by Chief Justice Morrison Waite (Note: "The court does not wish to hear argument on the question whether the provision in the Fourteenth Amendment to the Constitution, which forbids a State to deny to any person within its jurisdiction the equal protection of the laws, applies to these corporations. We are all of the opinion that it does." However, the Supreme Court decision did not itself address the matter of whether corporations were "persons" with respect to the Fourteenth Amendment; in Chief Justice Waite's words, "we avoided meeting the question". (118 U.S. 394 (1886) – According to the official court Syllabus in the United States Reports)) led to corporations as "persons" having the same rights as human beings, based on the Fourteenth Amendment to the United States Constitution.

Topics addressed include the Business Plot, where in 1933, General Smedley Butler exposed an alleged corporate plot against then-U.S. President Franklin D. Roosevelt; the tragedy of the commons; Dwight D. Eisenhower's warning people to beware of the rising military–industrial complex; economic externalities; suppression of an investigative news story about the bovine growth hormone on Fox affiliate television station WTVT in Tampa, Florida, at the behest of Monsanto; the invention of the soft drink Fanta by The Coca-Cola Company due to the trade embargo on Nazi Germany; the alleged role of IBM in the Holocaust (see IBM and the Holocaust); the Cochabamba protests of 2000 brought on by the privatization of a municipal water supply in Bolivia; and in general themes of corporate social responsibility, the notion of limited liability, the corporation as a psychopath; and the debate about corporate personhood.

Through vignettes and interviews, The Corporation examines and criticizes corporate business practices. The film's assessment is demonstrated using the diagnostic criteria in the DSM-IV. Robert D. Hare, a University of British Columbia psychology professor and FBI consultant, compares the profile of the contemporary profitable business corporation to that of a clinically diagnosed psychopath. The Corporation attempts to compare the way corporations are systematically compelled to behave with what it claims are the DSM-IV's symptoms of psychopathy, e.g., the callous disregard for the feelings of other people, the incapacity to maintain human relationships, the reckless disregard for the safety of others, the deceitfulness (continual lying to deceive for profit), the incapacity to experience guilt, and the failure to conform to social norms and respect the law.

=== Interviews ===
The film features interviews with prominent corporate critics such as Noam Chomsky, Charles Kernaghan, Naomi Klein, Michael Moore, Vandana Shiva, and Howard Zinn, as well as opinions from chief executive officers such as Ray Anderson (from Interface, Inc.), business guru Peter Drucker, Nobel laureate economist Milton Friedman, and think tanks advocating free markets such as the Fraser Institute. Interviews also feature Dr. Samuel Epstein, who was involved in a lawsuit against Monsanto for promoting the use of Posilac (trade name for recombinant Bovine somatotropin) to induce more milk production in dairy cattle, and Chris Barrett who, as a spokesperson for First USA, was the first corporately sponsored college student in America.

Joel Bakan, the author of the award-winning book The Corporation: The Pathological Pursuit of Profit and Power, writes:

The law forbids any motivation for their actions, whether to assist workers, improve the environment, or help consumers save money. They can do these things with their own money, as private citizens. As corporate officials, however, stewards of other people’s money, they have no legal authority to pursue such goals as ends in themselves – only as means to serve the corporations own interests, which generally means to maximize the wealth of its shareholders. Corporate social responsibility is thus illegal – at least when its genuine.

— Joel Bakan, The Corporation: The Pathological Pursuit of Profit and Power

== Release ==
=== Box office ===
The Corporation grossed around $3.5 million in North American box office receipts and had a worldwide gross of over $4.8 million, making it the second top-grossing film for its U.S. distributor, Zeitgeist Films. It took the place of Manufacturing Consent as the top-grossing feature documentary ever to come out of Canada.

=== Versions ===
==== TVO version ====
The extended edition made for TVOntario (TVO) separates the documentary into three one-hour episodes:

- "Pathology of Commerce": About the pathological self-interest of the modern corporation.
- "Planet Inc.": About the scope of commerce and the sophisticated, even covert, techniques marketers use to get their brands into our homes.
- "Reckoning": About how corporations cut deals with any style of government - from Nazi Germany to despotic states today - that allow or even encourage sweatshops, as long as sales go up.

==== DVD version ====
In April 2005, the film was released on DVD as a two-disc set that includes following:

- Disc 1: the film, two tracks of directors' and writer's commentary, 27 minutes of Q&As with the filmmakers, 17 minutes of deleted scenes (not including a hidden clip of the "Milton Friedman Choir" singing "An Ode To Privatization"), 39 minutes of Janeane Garofalo interviewing Joel Bakan on Air America Radio's The Majority Report, 7 minutes of Katherine Dodds on grassroots marketing, theatrical trailer, subtitles in three languages (English, French, Spanish), and descriptive audio.
- Disc 2: 165 unused interview clips and updates sorted by both interviewee ("Hear More From...") and topic ("Topical Paradise"). "Related Film Resources", which is one of the topics in "Topical Paradise", includes trailers for 14 other documentary films and a three-minute UK animated film.

In 2012, a new Canadian educational version was released for high school students. This "Occupy Your Future" version is exclusively distributed by Hello Cool World, who were behind the branding and grassroots outreach of the original film in four countries. This version is shorter and breaks the film into three parts. The extras include interviews with Joel Bakan on the Occupy movement, Katherine Dodds on social branding, and two short films from Annie Leonard's The Story of Stuff project.

=== Streaming ===
From 2017 until 2022, the film was formerly available for streaming online on Canada Media Fund's Encore+ YouTube channel, licensed by Programming and Operations Lead Paulina Abarca-Cantin.

The film is also available for digital purchase on Amazon Prime Video and iTunes.

== Reception ==
=== Critical reception ===
Film critics gave the film generally favorable reviews. The review aggregator Rotten Tomatoes reported that 90% of critics gave the film positive reviews, based on 111 reviews with an average rating of 7.4/10. The website's critical consensus reads, "The Corporation is a satisfyingly dense, thought-provoking rebuttal to some of capitalism's central arguments." Metacritic reported the film had an average score of 73 out of 100, based on 28 reviews.

In Variety, Dennis Harvey praised the film's "surprisingly cogent, entertaining, even rabble-rousing indictment of perhaps the most influential institutional model for our era" and its avoidance of "a sense of excessively partisan rhetoric" by deploying a wide range of interviewees and "a bold organizational scheme that lets focus jump around in interconnective, humorous, hit-and-run fashion."

In the Chicago Sun-Times, Roger Ebert described the film as "an impassioned polemic, filled with information sure to break up any dinner-table conversation," but felt that "at 145 minutes, it overstays its welcome. The wise documentarian should treat film stock as a non-renewable commodity."

The Economist review, while calling the film "a surprisingly rational coherent attack on capitalism's most important institution" and "a thought-provoking account of the firm", calls it incomplete. It suggests that the idea for an organization as a psychopathic entity originated with Max Weber, in regards to government bureaucracy. The reviewer remarks that while the film weighs heavily in favor of public ownership as a solution to the issues depicted, it fails to acknowledge the magnitude of evils committed in the name of public ownership, such as those of the Communist Party in the former Soviet Union.

=== Remarks by interview subject ===
Psychiatrist Robert D. Hare is interviewed in the film, and his Psychopathy Checklist is used to characterise behavior of corporations as psychopathic in the documentary. Hare's comments used in the film are that:

One of the questions that comes up periodically is to what extent could a corporation be considered to be psychopathic. And if we look at a corporation as a legal person, that it may not be that difficult to actually draw the transition between psychopathy in the individual, to psychopathy in a corporation. We could go through the characteristics that define this particular disorder, one by one, and see how they might apply to corporations...They would have all the characteristics, and in fact, in many respects, the corporation of that sort is the proto-typical psychopath.

In his book Snakes in Suits (2006; co-written with Paul Babiak), Hare writes that ":

Although the producers of the documentary stated that they used the term psychopath merely as a metaphor for the most egregious corporate entities, it is apparent that they had in mind corporations in general...To refer to the corporation as psychopathic because of the behaviors of a carefully selected group of companies is like using the traits and behaviors of the most serious high-risk criminals to conclude that the criminal (that is, every criminal) is a psychopath. If [common diagnostic criteria] were applied to a random set of corporations, some might apply for the diagnosis of psychopathy, but most would not.

However, in his monologue in The Corporation and the transcript of the interview, Hare, in addition to pointing out differences between corporations, clearly uses generalized terms with regard to numerous of his characterizations of psychopathy applying to corporations. He states, for example:

A psychopath doesn’t accept responsibility for his or her own behaviour. Usually diffusion of responsibility is the name of the game for the psychopath. Somebody else made me do it, it wasn’t my fault, it was fate. And I’m not really responsible. Corporations would do this almost routinely I would imagine.

== Awards ==
The film won or was nominated for over 26 international awards including winning the World Cinema Audience Award: Documentary at the Sundance Film Festival in 2004, a Special Jury Award at the International Documentary Film Festival Amsterdam (IDFA) in 2003 and a Genie Award - Documentary in 2005.

== See also ==
- Corporatocracy
- Empire (Hardt and Negri book) (2000)
- Evil corporation
- Manufacturing Consent (film) (1992), co-directed by Mark Achbar
- Manufacturing Consent (1988), the book upon which the eponymous film was based
- Psychopathy in the workplace
