= Roland Huntford =

British author (1927–2026)

Roland Huntford FRSL
- Born: Roland Horowitz; 4 September 1927; Cape Town, South Africa
- Died: 23 January 2026 (aged 98); Cambridge, England
- Education: University of Cape Town; Imperial College London
- Occupations: Biographer, author

Roland Huntford (né Horowitz; 4 September 1927 – 23 January 2026) was a British author, principally of biographies of Polar explorers.

== Background and education ==
Huntford was born on 4 September 1927, in Cape Town. Huntford, the son of Lithuanian parents (originally "Horowitz") living in South Africa, has stated that he was educated at the University of Cape Town and Imperial College London. In an interview with the glaciologist Charles Swithinbank, he claimed "his father was an Army officer and his mother was from Russia"; Ranulph Fiennes, however, observed that, during his own research on Captain Scott – in the course of which he presented reviews of, and himself assessed, Huntford's biographical work – he was unable to corroborate any of Huntford's own claims regarding his background, which presented his father as "some English colonial gentleman given to romantic travels in pre-Soviet Russia".

== Career ==
Huntford's author biography, used in publicity for his books, states that he worked for the United Nations in Geneva, then as a journalist for The Spectator. He was formerly Scandinavian correspondent of The Observer, also acting as their winter sports correspondent. He was the 1986–1987 Alistair Horne Fellow at St Antony's College, Oxford.

He wrote biographies of Robert Falcon Scott, Ernest Shackleton and Nobel Peace Prize winner Fridtjof Nansen; these biographies have been the subject of controversy.

Huntford put forth the point of view that Roald Amundsen's success in reaching the South Pole was abetted by much superior planning, whereas errors by Scott (notably including the reliance on horses instead of sled dogs) ultimately resulted in the death of Scott and his companions.

His other books include Sea of Darkness (LCCN 75-17690, LCCN 75-308453), The Sayings of Henrik Ibsen (LCCN 96-196895) and Two Planks and a Passion: The dramatic history of skiing (LCCN 2024-731383). His polemical The New Totalitarians (LCCN 72-189259, LCCN 75-127231) is a critique of socialism in Sweden, written from the point of view of western political culture. His main thesis was that the Swedish social democratic party, like the "new totalitarians" in Aldous Huxley's Brave New World, relied less upon the violence and intimidation of the old totalitarians than upon sly persuasion and soft manipulation in order to achieve its goals.

Huntford was elected a Fellow of the Royal Society of Literature (FRSL) in 2001.

== Death ==
Huntford died after a brief illness in Cambridge, England, on 23 January 2026, at the age of 98.

== Works ==
- A Cultural History of Snow
- The Last Place on Earth
- The New Totalitarians
- The Shackleton Voyages
