= Manufactured crisis =

Manufactured crisis may refer to:

== Books ==
- Manufactured Crisis: The Untold Story of the Iran Nuclear Scare, a 2014 book by Gareth Porter
- Manufactured Crisis: The War to End America, a 2024 book by James Simpson

== Other uses ==
- False flag, an act committed with the intent to place the blame on another party
- Fear, uncertainty, and doubt, a manipulative propaganda tactic

== See also ==
- Manufacturing Consent (disambiguation)
