= Peter Roeck =

Canadian film and television editor

Peter Roeck is a Canadian film and television editor. He is most noted for his work on the 2020 film The New Corporation: The Unfortunately Necessary Sequel, for which he was a Canadian Screen Award nominee for Best Editing in a Documentary at the 9th Canadian Screen Awards in 2021.
