= Chained (2020 film) =

2020 Canadian thriller film

- Directed by: Titus Heckel
- Written by: Titus Heckel
- Produced by: Rachelle Chartrand; Chester Sit
- Starring: Marlon Kazadi; Aleks Paunovic; Adrian Holmes
- Cinematography: Vince Arvidson
- Edited by: Jackie Dzuba
- Music by: Alfredo Santa Ana
- Production company: My Precious Pictures
- Distributed by: Freestyle Digital Media
- Release date: October 1, 2020 (VIFF)
- Running time: 104 minutes
- Country: Canada
- Language: English

Chained is a 2020 Canadian thriller drama film, written and directed by Titus Heckel. The film stars Marlon Kazadi as Taylor, a Black Canadian teenage boy subjected to abuse by his father Pete (Adrian Holmes); he meets and befriends Jim (Aleks Paunovic), a criminal who has been left chained up in an abandoned warehouse, only to begin turning into an abuser himself as he learns the power of using violence to get what he wants.

The film was produced in British Columbia in fall 2019, with shooting taking place in Kelowna and at the abandoned Kaleden hotel in Kaleden.

The film premiered at the 2020 Vancouver International Film Festival. It was included in the festival's online streaming platform, but was also one of the few films at the festival given a socially distanced physical screening at the VIFF Centre.

The film received six Vancouver Film Critics Circle award nominations at the Vancouver Film Critics Circle Awards 2020, for Best Actor in a Canadian Film (Kazadi), Best Supporting Actor in a Canadian Film (2: Holmes, Paunovic), Best Screenplay for a Canadian Film (Heckel), Best British Columbia Film and One to Watch (Heckel). It also won two awards at the New York International Film Awards.

== Cast ==
- Marlon Kazadi as Taylor
- Aleks Paunovic as Jim
- Adrian Holmes as Pete
- Roark Critchlow as Detective Smith
- Andrea Agur as Tina
- Leia Madu as Nora
- Emily Holmes as Grace
