= Uts'am Witness Project =

Environmental project in Canada, 1997–2007

The Uts'am Witness Project formally began in 1997, and was at first known as The Witness Project. The project was co-founded by artist photographer Nancy Bleck, world-renowned mountaineer John Clarke and Squamish Nation Hereditary Chief Bill Williams in order to bring the public onto the land, in a contested part of the Squamish Nation territory in a non-violent way. This part of the territory was known at the time as "Tree Farm License 38" (TFL38) and was threatened with logging. It was a time when there were many protests and clashes between environmentalists and loggers.

The project ran out of the Roundhouse Community Centre in Vancouver, also founded in 1997, and was featured as one of its first programs, with Nancy Bleck their first artist in residence. The public was invited participate in summer wilderness camping weekends at Sims Creek, in the Elaho Valley, and to participate in a traditional Coast Salish Witness Ceremony. Originally meant to last one summer, the project ended up running for 10 years, involving 10,000 people, and ultimately was successful at preserving the area from logging, and bringing it under protection through the Squamish Nation Sacred Land Use Plan.

In October 2013 a book about the project was published by Figure 1 Publishing featuring the photographic artwork of Nancy Bleck. Picturing Transformation Nexw-áyantsut was written by Katherine Dodds with Nancy Bleck and Chief Bill Williams and describes how the project helped not only protect the area from logging, but returned it to its ancestral name of Nexw-áyantsut, which means 'place of transformation' in the Squamish language.
