= The Magnitude of All Things =

2020 Canadian film directed by Jennifer Abbott

- Directed by: Jennifer Abbott
- Written by: Jennifer Abbott
- Produced by: Andrew Williamson; Henrik Meyer; Shirley Vercruysse; Jennifer Abbott
- Narrated by: Jennifer Abbott; Tara Samuel
- Cinematography: Vince Arvidson
- Edited by: Jennifer Abbott
- Production companies: Flying Eye Productions; Cedar Island Films
- Distributed by: National Film Board of Canada
- Release date: September 24, 2020 (VIFF)
- Running time: 86 minutes
- Country: Canada
- Language: English

The Magnitude of All Things is a Canadian documentary film, directed by Jennifer Abbott and released in 2020. The film explores the concept of environmental grief, through the lens of connecting Abbott's emotional reaction to the death of her sister Saille from cancer to her emotional reactions to climate change.

The film premiered at the 2020 Vancouver International Film Festival. It was subsequently screened at the 2020 Planet in Focus environmental film festival, where it won the award for Best Canadian Feature.

The film was shortlisted for the Vancouver Film Critics Circle award for Best Canadian Documentary at the Vancouver Film Critics Circle Awards 2020. The film received Canadian Screen Award nominations for Best Cinematography in a Documentary (Vince Arvidson) and Best Editing in a Documentary (Abbott) at the 10th Canadian Screen Awards in 2022.
