= The New Totalitarians =

1971 book by Roland Huntford

- Author: Roland Huntford
- Language: English
- Genre: Non-fiction
- Publication date: 1971
- Publication place: United Kingdom

The New Totalitarians is a 1971 book by British author Roland Huntford. Huntford analyzes the political and social climate of early 1970s Sweden, and argues that it resembles a benevolent totalitarian state in the mould of Aldous Huxley's Brave New World. The main thesis was that the Swedish government relied less upon the violence and intimidation of the old totalitarians than upon subtle persuasion and soft manipulation in order to achieve its goals. The influence of the state and official ideology were most visible in the most private of matters; where little or no consciously "political" control had stretched before.

== Summary ==
At the time that Huntford wrote, Sweden had been governed by the Social Democratic Party of Sweden for over 40 years. Huntford argues that this had led to the complete dominance of socialist thought at all levels of the government; including the bureaucracy and the judiciary; which were controlled by a powerful interconnecting network of Social Democratic labour unions, lobby groups, and partisan organizations. He also points to the fact that these networks had made it very difficult for non-socialists to achieve any position of real power in Sweden, but noted that few Swedes seemed to view this politicization of their state with concern.

The New Totalitarians also analyzes Swedish society in a broader historical context. The author argued that, since the country had bypassed the feudal system and had always been a very centralized state, Sweden had never developed a civic culture that champions individualism like most other countries of Western Europe. He thus argues that the country's political culture and institutions were very much the product of a unique socio-political context, and thus not applicable to otherwise comparable Western nations.

At the same time, he analyses how sex was being "politicized" by design from above. He argued that the changes in the sexual behaviour of the Swedes was a matter of official direction and that sexual liberalism had become the vicarious passion of a society trapped in boredom and "engineered consent".

== Influences ==
The book greatly influenced Canadian author Peter Brimelow, and is repeatedly cited in his similarly themed 1986 book on Canada, The Patriot Game.

== Criticism ==
Historians Henrik Beggren and Lars Trägårdh described that while being one of the most advanced welfare states in the world, Sweden is far from being collectivist. The Swedish welfare policies and Family Law are aimed at liberating people from dependence on family, church and private charities.
