= Michael Bakan =

American ethnomusicologist

Michael Bakan is a professor of ethnomusicology at Florida State University and director of the Balinese gamelan ensemble Sekaa Gong Hanuman Agung ("Gamelan Club of the Great Hanuman"). He wrote Music of Death and New Creation: Experiences in the World of Balinese Gamelan Beleganjur, a book said to have "elevated gamelan beleganjur to the level of the much better known gong kebyar".

Michael is the brother of noted Canadian legal theorist Joel Bakan.
