= Manufacturing Consent (disambiguation) =

Manufacturing Consent: The Political Economy of the Mass Media is a 1988 book by Edward S. Herman and Noam Chomsky.

Manufacturing Consent may also refer to:

- The "manufacture of consent", a phrase coined by Walter Lippmann in his 1922 book Public Opinion
- Manufacturing Consent (Burawoy book), a 1979 book by Michael Burawoy
- Manufacturing Consent: Noam Chomsky and the Media, a 1992 documentary film based on the book by Herman and Chomsky

== See also ==
- Inventing Reality, a book by Michael Parenti which discusses a similar idea
- "The Engineering of Consent", a 1947 essay by Edward Bernays
- Manufactured crisis (disambiguation)
- Mass media
- Noble lie
- Propaganda
- Social dynamics
- Social engineering (disambiguation)
- Walden Two § Cultural engineering
