= Redemption (Stargate SG-1) =

- Stargate SG-1 episodes
- Episode nos.: Season 6 Episodes 1 & 2
- Directed by: Martin Wood
- Written by: Robert C. Cooper
- Production codes: 601 & 602
- Original air dates: June 7, 2002; June 14, 2002

Guest appearances
- Tony Amendola as Bra'tac; Christopher Kennedy as Dr. Larry Murphy; David Hewlett as Rodney McKay; Gary Chalk as Colonel Chekov; Neil Denis as Rya'c; Gary Jones as Walter Harriman; Tobias Mehler as Lt. Simmons; David Palffy as Anubis; Aleks Paunovic as Shaq'rel; Ivan Cermak as Hagman; Craif McNair as Technician #1; Carrie Richie as Technician #2; Dan Shea as Siler; Michael Soltis as Medic

Episode chronology
← Previous "Revelations"	Next → "Descent"
- Stargate SG-1 (season 6)

"Redemption" is the two-part season 6 premiere of the science fiction television series Stargate SG-1. Airing on June 7 and June 14, 2002, it was the first all-new SG-1 episode to be broadcast by SCI FI, the new home of SG-1 after the series' move from Showtime. The episode was written by producer Robert C. Cooper, and directed by Martin Wood. "Redemption" is the first episode where actor Corin Nemec had main cast status, his character Jonas Quinn replacing Daniel Jackson (played by Michael Shanks) who died at the end of season 5. The episode also marks the second appearance of David Hewlett's character Rodney McKay, who later became a main character on Stargate Atlantis. "Redemption Part 2" was nominated for a Gemini Award in the category "Best Visual Effects".

== Part 1 ==
Major Carter invites Jonas Quinn, who left his home planet and has been living at Stargate Command (SGC) since Daniel Jackson's death ("Meridian"), to leave the base with SG-1. At Area 51, they see the newly built fighter jet X-302 for the first time, but O'Neill refuses to test-fly it (because of the X-301 incident in season 4's "Tangent"). Back at the SGC, O'Neill denies the proposal of General Hammond and Col. Chekov, who wants a Russian as the new fourth member of SG-1. Jonas admits to Carter that he wants to be a member of SG-1, and talks with Teal'c about O'Neill's mistrust in him. When Teal'c talks with his Colonel, O'Neill claims that Jonas is an alien.

Bra'tac arrives at the SGC and informs Teal'c that Drey'auc (Teal'c wife) is ill. By the time they have reached Chulak, Drey'auc has died. Teal'c's teenage son Rya'c wants to take revenge on Teal'c and starts to beat him down, but Bra'tac intervenes. Teal'c talks with Rya'c during Drey'auc burial, and Rya'c starts to cry. Meanwhile, at Earth, the SGC Stargate was dialed from off-world and has stayed open beyond its 38-minute limit, with energy of the gate rapidly rising. Carter presumes that the gate will eventually explode and potentially cause the destruction of Earth. Dr. Rodney McKay arrives at the SGC as ordered much to Carter's annoyance. Carter informs Col. Chekov that the X-302 will soon be ready so that Earth can contact the Asgard for help. As O'Neill and Carter start with X-302, Jonas and McKay inform Hammond of potential problems with the X-302's hyperspace engine due to the instability of the naqahdriah. Shortly before the X-302 enters hyperspace, they miss the window and the mission is cancelled.

Back on Chulak, a Jaffa arrives with a Tel'tak and reveals that Anubis is going to attack Earth's Stargate. Through trial and error of dialing planets that belong to Anubis, they finally find out which world the weapon is on. Back at SGC, Carter can only assume what caused the problem. A hologram of Anubis appears in the gateroom, saying in a very dramatic way that they will all be destroyed soon, much to O'Neill's annoyance.

== Part 2 ==
Dr. McKay talks with Major Carter about the situation, when McKay has the idea of using an EMP. General Hammond allows him to proceed, despite Carter's protest. She also presents the problems with that plan, but Hammond orders her to work with McKay. The plan is finally carried out, but it doesn't work. Suddenly lightning strikes from the machine. When Carter closes the iris, she is struck down.

On the Jaffa world, they find out where Anubis has positioned the weapon and together with Rya'c they use a Tel'tak to go there. The planet is guarded by Ha'taks, who detect the cloaked cargo ship and thus Teal'c, Bra'tac and Rya'c ring down to the planet, where they attack the Jaffa. During the battle however Rya'c is wounded. They then hide because there are many guards and patrolling Death gliders. The three Jaffa then find the weapon (which is of Ancient origin) and while Rya'c has to stay hidden the two adults go to the weapon. However the weapon is protected by a force field.

At SGC, Carter's wounds are treated in the infirmary and she is visited by McKay who apologizes to her and tells her about his past. It is also revealed that the time until the explosion is cut in half, as Carter had predicted. Later Carter visits Jonas who looks at the Stargate and asks her how they got the Stargate in the gate room. This gives Carter an idea. She tells the scientists there to use the X-302 to fling the Stargate into space, and all of them start working. Hammond later talks with Colonel Chekov about the use of their Stargate, but the Russians demand a lot in return.

On Anubis' planet, Teal'c and Bra'tac are caught by Jaffa and questioned but they keep silent. They then ask for Rya'c, which makes Teal'c angry. Rya'c later overhears what will happen with Teal'c and Bra'tac. He then goes to a place with ships and steals a Death glider. Afterwards, he attacks the Jaffa guarding Teal'c and Bra'tac, who then free themselves. He then attacks the weapon, and despite being hit by another glider, he destroys the weapon.

Back on Earth, Jonas suggests using the hyperspace engine, but they don't know what will happen if they are used inside the atmosphere. They nevertheless plan to do it and only open a hyperspace window for about one second, long enough to transport the X-302 far enough away from the Earth that the stargate's explosion is harmless. They carry out the plan successfully and O'Neill also ejects in time, much to the joy of the others.

Later, McKay leaves and says goodbye to Carter while O'Neill talks with Hammond. They are then contacted by Teal'c, who informs them that the weapon was destroyed. Later, the gate from the Russians is installed and, although they want a Russian member at SG-1, O'Neill decides to take Jonas in, who then leaves with the team on his first mission.

== Production ==
- This episode features a brand new opening sequence, with various shots of the gate spinning, and Michael Shanks' name being removed to make way for Corin Nemec's in between Christopher Judge and Don S. Davis.
- There was an intentional goof in the 18th minute of the episode: a monitor displayed the time that the wormhole had been active, but its reflection was not reflected mirror-inverted in the briefing room window, but displayed forwardly. This was done on purpose so that the viewer would have a concept of the time running out even when the timer wasn't in shot.
- "Redemption" was not originally a two-parter, but Robert C. Cooper noticed during writing that while the script was already too long, there was still a huge hole in the story. He always wanted to do more with Teal'c and Rya'c but never had the story to fit those scenes into.
- "Redemption" introduced the X-302, the first human-built fighter plane retro-engineered from Goa'uld technology. Andy Mikita came up with the idea to put the X-302 prop on a flatbed truck and drive it out of the hangar so that in the shot it looks like it taxies itself out. After Brad Wright and Robert C. Cooper, who have a passion for fighter jets, had flown in two T38 Airforce jets, Wright intended to write an episode with T38s in it, and bring the pilots from the US to Vancouver, Canada, where SG-1 was filmed. The T38s were put in the background of all shots.
- There was a lot of night-shooting in "Redemption".
- The scenes with O'Neill and Carter in masks in the X-302 were dubbed after filming.

=== Introduction of Jonas Quinn ===
At the end of season 5, Michael Shanks (Daniel Jackson) decided to leave Stargate SG-1 for concerns over being under-utilized. Some casting people from the SciFi Channel, who were looking to fill the void with a new character, happened to walk through the courtyard of MGM's Santa Monica offices where Corin Nemec was that day. They briefly mentioned Stargate to him, and the same afternoon Nemec's manager called Nemec to tell him they were interested in him. Since Nemec had never watched Stargate SG-1 up until that time (he was familiar with the Stargate film though), he was sent some videotapes of the show and had some more meetings until he was finally cast as Jonas Quinn for the penultimate season 5 episode "Meridian". Everyone agreed to wait and see how the character looked on film before deciding on long-term involvements, but MGM liked what they saw. Although "there's been quite a bit of ire directed by fans towards Daniel's replacement" after the airing of "Meridian", Robert C. Cooper hoped that they would like the character in the end.

"Redemption" is meant to establish that the new character can contribute ideas and be a team player. Writer Robert C. Cooper also felt it was important to acknowledge and not "trivialize what the [Daniel Jackson] character meant to the team and to the show for five seasons". The producers based Jonas's motivation to join SG-1 on his former reluctance to shut off the machine that would indirectly kill Daniel, and his feelings of responsibility of Daniel's death. According to producer Joseph Mallozzi before the airing of season 6, "Jonas will bring a unique alien perspective and ability to the team. In particular, this 'ability' will allow him to contribute in areas of expertise usually owned by Sam and Daniel. ... Jonas will take a heat off Sam in particular, allowing her to open up a little more." Producer Brad Wright said that "What Corin, as Jonas, will bring to the show is a renewed sense of amazement at the fact that we're crossing the galaxy in a single step [through a stargate]. It's still a profound and amazing thing that's happening, no matter how accustomed our characters are to it."

Carter is one of the three SG-1 members Jonas Quinn feels most comfortable around, and Jonas hopes that she and Teal'c can persuade O'Neill to give him a chance to prove himself worthy of a place on the team. However, according to Richard Dean Anderson, "O'Neill feels that Jonas is directly responsible for the demise or at least the damaging of Daniel Jackson. [...] As a result, he harbours some resentment towards Jonas. [At the end of "Redemption",] O'Neill has finally come to the point of accepting Jonas but not entirely. [...] O'Neill is suspicious of aliens in general. The only exception is Teal'c [...] and O'Neill refuses to or isn't able to forget that Jonas is an alien." According to Amanda Tapping, "there is a hesitancy on [Carter]'s part to be too familiar with Jonas. [...] She is not to make this big emotional investment in Jonas because he's not Daniel. [...] In some ways, Jonas has inadvertently brought the three [remaining SG-1 members] closer together." Corin Nemec thought that "the writers hit the nail on the head in starting the season off" with a prolonged transition stage, and Jonas's "easy-going nature" later "help[s] him establish relationships not only with his fellow teammates but also Dr Fraiser and General Hammond, who according to Nemec is "very much a father figure in Jonas's eyes". However, Anderson was convinced that "O'Neill is [nevertheless not] going to warm up to Jonas very much at all", something which Nemec felt "makes things much more interesting".

== Release and reception ==
Part one of "Redemption" first aired on Sci Fi in the United States on June 7, 2002, whilst part two aired the following week on June 14, 2002. Airing on Sci Fi, Stargate SG-1 was followed by Farscape, with Sci Fi president Bonnie Hammer hoping that fans of Stargate would "stick around" to improve Farscape's ratings. Part one reportedly earned a 1.8 household rating, equating to approximately 1.35 million homes viewing, whilst part two earned a 1.7 rating, equating to approximately 1.3 million homes. In the United Kingdom part one and two first aired on Sky One on September 25, 2002, and were the 10th and 7th most watched programs on the channel that week, with 73 thousand and 78 thousand viewers respectively.

Mark Sachs for The Los Angeles Times praised the "smooth rapport" and "sly quippery" of Anderson, Tapping, Judge and newcomer Nemec, which combined with "all the interplanetary carrying-on make for a rollicking good time". Sachs also believed the episode was a good episode for newcomers to the series to start with. Jan Vincent-Rudzki for TV Zone praised the episode for its humour, style and "ability to surprise, treating the audience as intelligent". Vicent-Ridzki awarded part one 7 out of 10 and part two 9 out of 10, calling the special effects "astounding as ever", but it was new character Jonas Quinn the reviewer called the "biggest plus".

Chris Wyatt for Cinescape magazine also positively received the episode, writing "solid ensemble character work and an interesting premise prove that there will be life after Daniel Jackson". Wyatt did however question why they chose to begin the season and change from Showtime to Sci Fi with an episode "deeply mired in mythology" and was also critical of what he called "seemingly endless scenes of spoken exposition". Brian Ford Sullivan for The Futon Critic believed "the show has never looked and or played better", going on to highlight the episodes "exciting battles and a surprisingly easily accessible storyline". Kathie Huddleston for Science Fiction Weekly felt Nemec's Quinn was reminiscent of Daniel Jackson from early episodes of the series although believed he was "less of a nerd, but just as curious, intelligent and gentle of spirit". Huddleston awarded the episode a B grade but believed the writers needed to focus "more on the exploration of other planets and less on trying to figure out unique ways to endanger the human race".

KJB for IGN was less positive, calling Stargate SG-1 at its best "a standard action adventure hour with some interesting characters" and at its worst "a cheap excuse for tired old science fiction cliche's", believing "Redemption" "falls somewhere in between". Mark A. Perigard was similarly negative in his review in The Boston Herald, believing the series had "run out of stories to tell" and accused Anderson "just collecting a paycheck". WhatCulture included the episode as their 5th "most controversial" episode of Stargate due to Daniel Jackson being replaced by Jonas Quinn on SG-1.

Corin Nemec came on board amid controversy. At the beginning of season 6, producer Joseph Mallozzi admitted to still getting the "odd incoherent rambling death threat passed along to me from the [Save Daniel Jackson] site."

The work of James Tichenor, Simon Ager, Michelle Comens, Adam de Bosch Kemper, Deborah Dunphy, Shannon Gurney, Krista McLean, Matthew Talbot-Kelly, Craig Van Den Biggelaar and Bruce Woloshyn on the episode earned them a nomination for "Best Visual Effects" at the 19th Gemini Awards, with Shattered City: The Halifax Explosion ultimately winning the award.
