= Manufacturing Consent (film) =

Manufacturing Consent: Noam Chomsky and the Media
- Film poster
- Directed by: Mark Achbar; Peter Wintonick
- Starring: Mark Achbar; Noam Chomsky
- Distributed by: Zeitgeist Films
- Release date: 1992
- Running time: 167 minutes
- Countries: Australia; Finland; Norway; Canada
- Language: English

Manufacturing Consent: Noam Chomsky and the Media is a 1992 documentary film that explores the political life and ideas of linguist, intellectual, and political activist Noam Chomsky. Filmmakers Mark Achbar and Peter Wintonick expand the analysis of capitalism and mass media presented in Manufacturing Consent, a 1988 book Chomsky wrote with Edward S. Herman.

== Overview ==
The film presents and illustrates Chomsky and Herman's propaganda model thesis that corporate media, as profit-driven institutions, tend to serve and further the agendas and interests of dominant, elite groups in the society. A centerpiece of the film is a long examination of the history of The New York Times' coverage of the Indonesian occupation of East Timor, which Chomsky says exemplifies the media's unwillingness to criticize an ally of the elite.

== Companion book ==
Mark Achbar edited a companion book of the same name. It features a transcript of the film annotated with excerpts from referenced and relevant materials as well as several comments from Noam Chomsky interspersed throughout. Eighteen "Philosopher All-Stars" baseball cards (as seen in the film) are also included. On the back of each card is a short summary of the person, titles of their major works, and a series of quotations attributed to the individual. Chomsky is featured as a card in the set, as are René Descartes, Jean-Jacques Rousseau, Voltaire, Mary Wollstonecraft, Wilhelm von Humboldt, Pierre-Joseph Proudhon, Sojourner Truth, Karl Marx, Sitting Bull, Rosa Luxemburg, Peter Kropotkin, Emma Goldman, Mahatma Gandhi, Martin Luther King Jr., Bertrand Russell, and Michel Foucault. The book made The Globe and Mail's national bestseller list in Canada.

The first half of the book, hyperlinked to the relevant portions of the film's audio, is available online from Z Magazine. The entire book is available as a PDF document on the Region 2 DVD of the film.

== Release ==
Until the release of The Corporation (2003), made by Mark Achbar, Jennifer Abbott and Joel Bakan, it was the most successful feature documentary in Canadian history playing theatrically in over 300 cities around the world. It appeared in more than 50 international film festivals where it received 22 awards. It was broadcast on television in over 30 markets and translated into a dozen languages.

On the review aggregator website Rotten Tomatoes, 78% of 9 critics' reviews are positive.

Chomsky stated in an on-stage interview at the 2013 New York City Documentary festival that he had never actually seen the documentary because "I can't stand watching myself...but I'm told it was a pretty impressive film." In a published conversation with Achbar and several activists, he stated that "the positive impact of it has been astonishing to me" but people mistakenly get the impression that he is the leader of a movement that they should join. He also criticized The New York Times review of the film, which he said mistook his message for being a call for voter organizing rather than for engaging in media critique and political action.

== See also ==
- Concentration of media ownership
- Propaganda model
- List of films dealing with anarchism
