= Social engineering =

Social engineering may refer to:

- Social engineering (political science), a means of influencing particular attitudes and social behaviors on a large scale
- Social engineering (security), obtaining confidential information by manipulating or deceiving people

== See also ==
- Walden Two#Cultural engineering
- Manufacturing Consent (disambiguation)
- Mass media
- Noble lie
- Propaganda
- Social dynamics
- Social software
- Social technology
- Urban planning
