= A Cow at My Table =

- Directed by: Jennifer Abbott
- Produced by: Flying Eye Productions
- Music by: Oh Susanna
- Release date: 1998
- Running time: 90 minutes
- Country: Canada

A Cow at My Table is a 1998 documentary film examining Western attitudes towards farm animals and meat.

It covers the conflict between animal rights advocates and the meat industry, and their respective attempts to influence consumers. It was directed, shot, and edited by Jennifer Abbott, who spent five years travelling across Canada, the United States, Australia and New Zealand to interview representatives on all sides. The film intercuts these interviews with images of farm animals and industrial farming operations. It explores what is sometimes popularly called factory farming.

The filming of A Cow at My Table drew early criticism from the Canadian meat industry, with both the Ontario Chicken Marketing Board and the Dairy Farmers of Ontario publishing articles warning of Abbott's actions.

Music for the film was performed by Oh Susanna.

== See also ==
- List of vegan and plant-based media
