= Zombie Town =

- Theatrical release poster
- Directed by: Peter Lepeniotis
- Written by: Dean Wilkinson; Michael Samonek; Michael Schwartz; Peter Lepeniotis
- Based on: Zombie Town by R. L. Stine
- Produced by: John Gillespie
- Starring: Marlon Kazadi; Madi Monroe; Henry Czerny; Chevy Chase; Dan Aykroyd
- Cinematography: Rudolf Blahacek
- Edited by: Marc Roussel
- Music by: Ryan Shore
- Production companies: Trimuse Entertainment; Viva Pictures; Now Entertainment Group; Lookout Entertainment; Toonz Entertainment
- Distributed by: Viva Pictures
- Release date: September 1, 2023
- Running time: 92 minutes
- Country: Canada
- Language: English
- Box office: $130,802

Zombie Town is a 2023 Canadian comedy horror film directed by Peter Lepeniotis in his live action debut. It is based on the 2000 novel of the same name by R. L. Stine. The film stars Marlon Kazadi, Madi Monroe, Henry Czerny, Chevy Chase, and Dan Aykroyd.

== Plot ==
Two teenagers watch a reclusive horror filmmaker's latest film, which turns a town into zombies. The teenagers use the Eye of Horus on a canister lid to ward off zombies.

== Cast ==
- Dan Aykroyd as Len Carver
- Chevy Chase as Mezmarian
- Marlon Kazadi as Mike Broadstreet
- Henry Czerny as Richard Landro
- Madi Monroe as Amy Maxwell
- Scott Thompson as Andy
- Bruce McCulloch as Officer Jenkins
- R. L. Stine as Director (cameo)

== Production ==
In August 2022, it was announced that Aykroyd, Chase and several other actors were cast in the film and that filming occurred in Ontario. The film was shot in Sudbury in September 2022. Principal photography wrapped that same month after four weeks of filming.

The score was composed by Ryan Shore.

== Release ==
The film was released in theaters in Canada on August 18, 2023. It also premiered on Hulu on October 6, 2023.

== Reception ==
On the review aggregator website Rotten Tomatoes, 44% of nine critics' reviews are positive, with an average rating of 6.2/10.
