= Titus Heckel =

Canadian film director and screenwriter

Titus Heckel is a Canadian film director and screenwriter from Vancouver, British Columbia. He is most noted for his 2020 film Chained, for which he received three Vancouver Film Critics Circle award nominations at the Vancouver Film Critics Circle Awards 2020, for Best Screenplay in a Canadian Film, Best British Columbia Film and One to Watch.

His first feature film, With Child, was released in 2014. He also wrote and directed the short film The Better Man (2012), and wrote the television thriller film A Deadly Vendetta (2018).
