= Aleks Paunovic =

Canadian actor (born 1969)

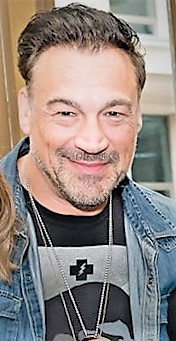
- Paunovic in 2018
- Born: June 29, 1969 (age 57); Winnipeg, Manitoba, Canada
- Occupation: Actor
- Years active: 1994–present
- Height: 6 ft 5 in (196 cm)

Aleks Paunovic (born June 29, 1969) is a Canadian actor. Some of his many roles include prospector Jim McAllister on drama TV series Arctic Air (2012–2014), Julius on fantasy horror drama series Van Helsing (2016–2021), imposing warrior Wygar Oak on the second season of Dirk Gently's Holistic Detective Agency (2017) and Bojan "Boki" Boscovic on dystopian thriller series Snowpiercer (2020–2024).

== Biography ==
Paunovic is from Winnipeg, Manitoba, and "three generations of fighters" are in his family. His father is of Serbian descent, and his mother is of Croatian ancestry. His grandfather, father and uncle were all champion boxers in Yugoslavia, and he was a champion boxer until a shoulder injury ended his career. Paunovic was in a rock band before he got an acting job at his first audition. He supports the Red Cross/Impact Anti-Bullying Campaign, as he had been bullied as a child.

== Filmography ==
=== Film ===
Year	Title	Role	Notes	Ref.
2002	Wishmaster: The Prophecy Fulfilled	Brick	Direct-to-video	
2002	I Spy	Bob		
2004	Seven Times Lucky	Sacco		
2007	Taming Tammy	Sy		
2008	Heart of a Dragon	Tim		
2009	Personal Effects	Tom		
2009	Driven to Kill	Tony Links	Direct-to-video	
2010	Transparency	Linder		
2010	Blood: A Butcher's Tale	Tony Links	Direct-to-video	
2010	Guido Superstar: The Rise of Guido	Hubs Cappa		
2011	In the Name of the King 2: Two Worlds	Allard	Direct-to-video	
2012	Charlie	Earnest		
2013	Percy Jackson: Sea of Monsters	Cyclops		
2013	The Marine 3: Homefront	Gabriel	Direct-to-video	
2014	Feed the Gods	Pete		
2014	What an Idiot	Caleb		
2015	Badge of Honor	Samuel		
2015	Dead Rising: Watchtower	Logan	Streaming film	
2015	Vendetta	Griffin Abbott		
2015	Blackway	Skell		
2015	Numb	Lee		
2016	Kindergarten Cop 2	Zogu	Direct-to-video	
2017	A Very Sordid Wedding	Hardy		
2017	War for the Planet of the Apes	Winter		
2018	The Age of Adulting	Woodrow		
2018	Siberia	Yefrem		
2018	Freaks	Robert Kraigen		
2019	Cold Pursuit	Det. Osgard		
2019	Puppet Killer	Jamie		
2019	Volition	Terry		
2020	Chained	Jim		
2021	Zero Contact	Trevor Williams		
2023	The Silent Service	Logan Steiger	Japanese film	

=== Television ===
Year	Title	Role	Notes	Ref.
1994	Heads	Roderick	Television film	
2002	Jeremiah	Stomp	Episode: "Red Kiss"	
2002	Stargate SG-1	Shaq'rel	Episode: "Redemption: Parts 1 & 2"	
2002	Christmas Rush	Petrovich	Television film	
2002	John Doe	Pavel Kovarik	Episode: "Manifest Destiny"	
2003	The Crooked E: The Unshredded Truth About Enron	Lazarri	Television film	
2003	Andromeda	Agio	Episode: "Vault of the Heavens"	
2003	Picking Up & Dropping Off	Joey	Television film	
2004	Mutant X	Nick	Episode: "Divided Loyalties"	
2004	Cold Squad	Cal Blannon	Episode: "Cock of the Walk"	
2005	The Dead Zone	Matthew Meter	Episode: "The Last Goodbye"	
2005	Chasing Christmas	Vincent	Television film	
2005	Painkiller Jane	Sgt. Frizelle	Television film	
2005–2007	Battlestar Galactica	Marine Sgt. Omar Fischer	Recurring role	
2006	Whistler	Vic Mostov	Episode: "The Looks of Love"	
2006	Supernatural	Sean's Friend	Episode: "Crossroad Blues"	
2006	Kraken: Tentacles of the Deep	Ike	Television film	
2006	Psych	Security Guard	Episode: "Spellingg Bee"	
2007	Maneater	Sgt. Winshiser	Television film	
2007	Bionic Woman	Curtis	Episode: "Sisterhood"	
2007	Stargate Atlantis	Rakai	Episode: "Reunion"	
2008	Smallville	Orderly	Episode: "Labyrinth"	
2009	Fireball	Draven	Television film	
2009	Sanctuary	The Duke	Episode: "Penance"	
2010	Supernatural	Skinwalker (Pack Leader's Second in Command)	Episode: "All Dogs Go To Heaven"	
2010	Human Target	Alexei Volkov	Episode: "Embassy Row"	
2010	Riverworld	Bernardo	Television film	
2010	Caprica	William Adama Sr.	Episode: "The Dirteaters"	
2010	Gotta Grudge?	Big Al	Television film	
2011	InSecurity	Victor	Episode: "Keeping Up with the Laslovs"	
2011	Smallville	OrderlyThug #1	2 episodes	
2012	The Christmas Consultant	Boris Tartakov	Television film	
2012–2014	Arctic Air	Jim McAllister	Recurring role	
2013	Republic of Doyle	Angus Farris	Episode: "The Common Wealth"	
2013	Eve of Destruction	Ruslan	Miniseries	
2013	Chupacabra vs. the Alamo	Agent Perez	Television film	
2013	Once Upon a Time	Berkley	Episode: "The Evil Queen"	
2013	Hell on Wheels	Anton Hersch	Episode: "Cholera"	
2013	Psych	Serbian #1	Episode: "Lassie Jerky"	
2013	Christmas Bounty	Manucci	Television film	
2014	Parked	Hector	Episode: "Pilot (DADS)"	
2014	Far from Home	Dale Cottonwood	Television film	
2014	Zapped	Ted	Television film	
2014	Psych	Bartender	Episode: "Cog Blocked"	
2014–2015	The 100	Gustus	Recurring role	
2015	iZombie	Julien DuPont	Recurring role; 8 episodes	
2015	Ghost Unit	Jadranko	Episode #1.1	
2015	Continuum	Rollins	Recurring role	
2015	Dashing Through the Snow	Blade	Television film	
2016	Supernatural	Gunner Lawless	Episode: "Beyond the Mat"	
2016	Motive	Sgt. Fred Blunt	2 episodes	
2016–2021	Van Helsing	Julius	Main role	
2017	Zoo	Dallas	2 episodes	
2017	Hell's Kitchen	Himself	Guest diner; Reality series Episode: "Catch of the Day"	
2017	Dirk Gently's Holistic Detective Agency	Wygar Oak	Recurring role; 6 episodes	
2018	Arrow	C.O. Felton	2 episodes	
2020–2024	Snowpiercer	Bojan "Boki" Boscovic	Recurring role	
2021	Hawkeye	Ivan Banionis	Recurring role; 4 episodes	
2024	The Silent Service	Logan Steiger	6 episodes	
2025	Reacher	Taktorov	Episode: "Unfinished Business"	
2025	Percy Jackson and the Olympians	Polyphemus	2 episodes	

=== Web ===
Year	Title	Role	Notes	Ref.
2011	Mortal Kombat: Legacy	Shao Kahn	Episode: "Kitana & Mileena: Parts 1 & 2"	

== Awards and nominations ==
For his role of Julius in Van Helsing, Paunovic has been nominated three times for Leo Awards: in 2018 - Best Lead Performance by a Male: Dramatic Series, in 2019 - Best Supporting Performance by a Male: Dramatic Series, and in 2022 - Best Lead Performance by a Male: Dramatic Series.
