= Mark Achbar =

Canadian filmmaker (born 1955)

- Born: 1955 (age 70–71); Ottawa, Ontario, Canada
- Occupations: film director, film producer
- Notable work: Manufacturing Consent; The Corporation

Mark Achbar (born 1955) is a Canadian filmmaker, best known for The Corporation (2003), Manufacturing Consent: Noam Chomsky and the Media (1992). He has also been an executive producer on feature documentaries.

== Biography ==
Achbar is a graduate of Syracuse University's Fine Arts Film Program. He interned in Hollywood on the children's TV programme Bill Daily's Hocus Pocus Gang, followed by three years in Toronto with Sunrise Films on its documentary series Spread your Wings, and briefly on the CBC/Disney series Danger Bay. He subsequently worked with his friend, director/writer Robert Boyd, and received a Gemini nomination for Best Writer on The Canadian Conspiracy, a cultural/political satire for CBC, and HBO's Comedy Experiments hosted by Martin Mull, featuring Canadian-born stars: Eugene Levy, Lorne Greene, Leslie Nelson, William Shatner, Morley Safer, Howie Mandel, Peter Jennings, John Candy, Dave Thomas, Margot Kidder, and Anne Murray. The fake documentary chronicled Canada's secret takeover of the United States. The program won a Gemini for Best Entertainment Special and was nominated for an International Emmy.

Achbar moved into independent media, working in many capacities on films, videos, and books, notably Peter Watkins' 14.5-hour documentary The Journey, and the book At Work In The Fields of The Bomb with photojournalist Robert Del Tredici. With Peter Wintonick, Achbar co-directed and co-produced Manufacturing Consent: Noam Chomsky and the Media (1992), which was, until the release of The Corporation, Canada's all-time top-grossing feature documentary. Achbar's companion book to the film is on the national bestseller list in Canada.

Achbar collaborated with Jennifer Abbott to create Two Brides and a Scalpel: Diary of a Lesbian Marriage, a video diary by the couple who became known as Canada's first legally married same-sex couple. This video diary was filmed by Georgina Scott, a transgender heavy equipment operator who legally married Linda Fraser, a lesbian woman, and then underwent male-to-female sex reassignment surgery. The film received festival invitations from around the world and was broadcast in Canada on Pridevision and the Knowledge Network.

In 1997, Achbar initiated a documentary film project titled The Corporation with author and University of British Columbia law professor Joel Bakan. Bakan wrote the film and book, while Achbar co-directed, produced, and executive-produced the film, with Jennifer Abbott joining the team as co-director and editor in 2000. The Corporation was released theatrically in 2004 and stands as the all-time top-grossing feature documentary made in Canada. During its 5-year existence, Encore+, a YouTube portal for "classic" Canadian films and TV shows (2017–2022), accumulated over 8,263,108 views of the film, its top-ranked title out of 2,500+ titles. Manufacturing Consent was 2nd ranked, with over 7,380,819 views, an indication of the enduring relevance of the issues the film explores.

Telefilm, a Canadian film and television financing agency, had a generous incentive program for producers of successful theatrical films. Until 2004, those films were exclusively dramas. The Corporation changed that. For the first time, a documentary's box office gross qualified it for a "performance envelope" – a reserve fund for the top Canadian producers whose films gross over $1m. A total of $2.38m was awarded to Achbar's company, Invisible Hand Productions Inc—diminished from the $4.5m the program would have awarded a dramatic production—which he, in collaboration with co-EP Betsy Carson, invested into ten Canadian feature documentaries: five in development and five in production; $270,000 of development financing and a further $5.85m of production financing was locked in for those productions.

The completed, theatrically released productions which benefited from this funding are: Velcrow Ripper's Fierce Light, When Spirit Meets Action; Denis Delestrac's Pax Americana and the Weaponisation of Space, Kevin McMahon's Waterlife, Frederick Gertten's Bananas: Poison in a Banana Republic; Mathieu Roy's and Harold Crooks' Surviving Progress; and Oliver Hockenhull's Neurons to Nirvana: Understanding Psychedelic Medicine.

In 2022, Achbar helped shoot and is an Executive Producer on DOSED2-The Trip Of A Lifetime.

Achbar continues his film career as an Executive Producer of feature documentary films and the occasional mockumentary. He has contributed his videography skills to two animal rights videos, Penny's Story and Meat The Victims: Excelsior Farms.

Achbar is co-founder, with Sarah Butterfield, of Speakables, a Vancouver technology startup.

Achbar is an investor in Humanitas Smart Planet Fund and Versance.ai.

== Selected films ==
Director and producer:

- Manufacturing Consent: Noam Chomsky and the Media (with Peter Wintonick) (1992)
- Two Brides And A Scalpel: Diary of a Lesbian Marriage (with co-director and editor Jennifer Abbott) (1999)
- The Corporation (with co-director and editor Jennifer Abbott and writer Joel Bakan) (2003)
- Romancing The Atom, directed by Mark Achbar (in production)

Executive producer with Betsy Carson:

Executive producer with Betsy Carson:

- Fierce Light: When Spirit Meets Action, directed by Velcrow Ripper (with NFB Executive Producer Silva Basmajian) (2008)
- Pax Americana and the Weaponization of Space, directed by Denis Delestrac (2009)
- Waterlife, directed by Kevin McMahon (and with Executive Producers Michael McMahon and NFB's Silva Basmajian) (2009)
- Bananas: Poison in a Banana Republic, directed by Fredrik Gertten (2009)
- Surviving Progress, directed by Mathieu Roy and Harold Crooks (and with Executive Producer Martin Scorsese) (2011)
- Neurons To Nirvana, directed by Oliver Hockenhull (2013)
- Romancing The Atom, directed by Mark Achbar (in production with producer and EP Betsy Carson) Supported by Knowledge Network and TVO, Canada Media Fund, and Creative BC

Executive producer

- Blue Gold: World Water Wars, directed by Sam Bozzo (2008)
- Marmato, directed by Mark Grieco (2014)
- Fractured Land, directed by Fiona Rayher and Damien Gillis (2015)
- When the Storm Fades, directed by Sean Devlin (with Executive Producers Naomi Klein, The Yes Men) (2017)
- DOSED: The Trip of a Lifetime, directed by Tyler Chandler and Nicholas Meyers (2022)
- Calling All People, directed by Hollie McGowan (2024)
- Fairy Creek, directed by Jen Muranetz (2024)
- The Mad World of Harvey Kurtzman , on the writer and editor of the comic book Mad, directed and produced by Bart Simpson (2026)
- Searching For Drug Peace, directed and co-produced by Alisher Balfanbayev, co-producer Max Joelson
- Chemical Consent, directed and produced by Ana Maria Carrizales (in progress)

Awards for "The Canadian Conspiracy"

- Gemini Award nomination, Best Writer, The Canadian Conspiracy — "a cultural/political satire for CBC and HBO's Comedy Experiments."

Awards for "The Corporation"

1. Audience Award, World Cinema, Documentary Sundance Film Festival
2. Audience Award Philadelphia International Film Festival
3. Audience Award Vancouver International Film Festival
4. Audience Award Thessaloniki Documentary Film Festival
5. Audience Award FIC Brasília International Film Festival
6. Audience Award (1st runner-up) Calgary International Film Festival
7. Audience Award (1st runner-up) Toronto International Film Festival
8. Insight Award for Excellence National Association of Film and Digital Media Artists, US
9. Best Documentary The Genie Awards, 2005
10. Genesis Award for Outstanding Documentary Film United States Humane Society
11. Audience Award for Best Feature Length Film Ecocinema International Film Festival, Rhodes
12. Best Feature Documentary Environmental Media Association Awards
13. Reel Room Audience Award for Best Documentary Sydney Film Festival
14. Joris Ivens Special Jury Award International Documentary Festival, Amsterdam
15. NFB Best Documentary Award Calgary International Film Festival
16. Best Feature Length Documentary Ecocinema International Film Festival, Rhodes
17. Top Ten Films of the Year Toronto International Film Festival Group
18. Best Documentary Program or Series - History/Biography/Social/Political Leo Award
19. Best Direction in a Documentary Program or Series Leo Award
20. Best Screenwriting in a Documentary Program or Series Leo Award
21. Best Picture Editing in a Documentary Program or Series Leo Award
22. Best Overall Sound in a Documentary Program or Series Leo Award
23. Best Sound Editing in a Documentary Program or Series Leo Award
24. Best Documentary (1st runner-up) Seattle International Film Festival
25. Special Jury Mention Montreal New Film And Video Festival

Awards for Manufacturing Consent

1. Golden Sesterce (Grand Prize) 1992 Visions du Réel documentary film festival, Nyon, Switzerland
2. Special Mention, FIPRESCI International Press Jury 1992 Visions du Réel documentary film festival, Nyon, Switzerland
3. Special Mention, Public Jury 1992 Nyon International Documentary Film Festival
4. Federal Express Award for Most Popular Canadian Film 1992 Vancouver International Film Festival
5. Gold Hugo (Best Social/Political Documentary) 1992 Chicago International Film Festival
6. Special Mention, Unanimous Jury Award 1992 Toronto International Festival of Festivals
7. Special Jury Award 1992 Atlantic Film Festival
8. Public's "Most Loved" Documentary 1992 Sydney International Film Festival
9. Gold Apple 1993 National Educational Film and Video Festival
10. Honourable Mention 1993 American Film and Video Festival
11. Director's Choice Award 1993 Charlotte Film and Video Festival
12. Voted "Best of the Festival" by Public 1993 Edmonton Global Visions Film Festival
13. Gold Conch (Grand Prize ex-aqueo) 1994 Bombay International Documentary Film Festival
14. Critics' Award 1994 Bombay International Film Festival
15. Grand Prize- Best Political Documentary 1994 Canadian Documentary Film Festival
16. Prix de la Critique Internationale/FIPRESCI Fédération Internationale de la Presse Cinématographique Festival de NYONE
17. Distinguished Documentary Achievement 1994 International Documentary Association

=== Nominations or semi-finalist for Manufacturing Consent ===
1. Yamagata International Documentary Film Festival
2. International Documentary Association Awards
3. Blois International Film Festival
4. Quinzaine du cinéma québécois
5. The Orwell Award
6. Best Documentary of the Year - New Internationalist Magazine
1. References
