= The New Corporation: The Unfortunately Necessary Sequel =

2020 Canadian documentary film

- Directed by: Joel Bakan; Jennifer Abbott
- Written by: Joel Bakan
- Based on: The New Corporation: How "Good" Corporations are Bad for Democracy by Joel Bakan
- Produced by: Betsy Carson; Trish Dolman
- Narrated by: Charles Officer
- Cinematography: Ian Kerr
- Edited by: Peter Roeck
- Music by: Matt Robertson
- Production company: Grant Street Productions
- Release date: September 13, 2020 (TIFF)
- Running time: 105 minutes
- Country: Canada
- Language: English

The New Corporation: The Unfortunately Necessary Sequel is a 2020 Canadian documentary film directed by Joel Bakan and Jennifer Abbott. A sequel to the influential 2003 film The Corporation, the film profiles new developments in the political and social power of corporations in the seventeen years since the release of the original.

The film premiered at the 2020 Toronto International Film Festival.

== Critical response ==
Writing for Now and The Georgia Straight, Norman Wilner reviewed the film positively, stating that "There’s not a lot of new information here, but the organization is thoughtful and pointed, summing up two decades of immoral, destructive conduct by businesses whose CEOs understand that any fines that might be levied against them for their actions are worth paying, given the massive profits those actions will create. And yes, this furious anti-corporate documentary counts Rogers and Bell among its production partners. That’s 2020 for you."

Michael Vecchio of Exclaim! was more dismissive, writing that "while the nefarious actions of the corporate world remain as devious as ever, knowledge of their conduct has become more mainstream, and so it is not so much that what this sequel is presenting is not important, but rather that it hardly gives viewers any new insight. Indeed, the question does arise; is this sequel really as necessary as its title claims?"

== Awards ==
At the 9th Canadian Screen Awards, Peter Roeck received a nomination for Best Editing in a Documentary.
