= Joel Bakan =

Canadian legal scholar and filmmaker (born 1959)

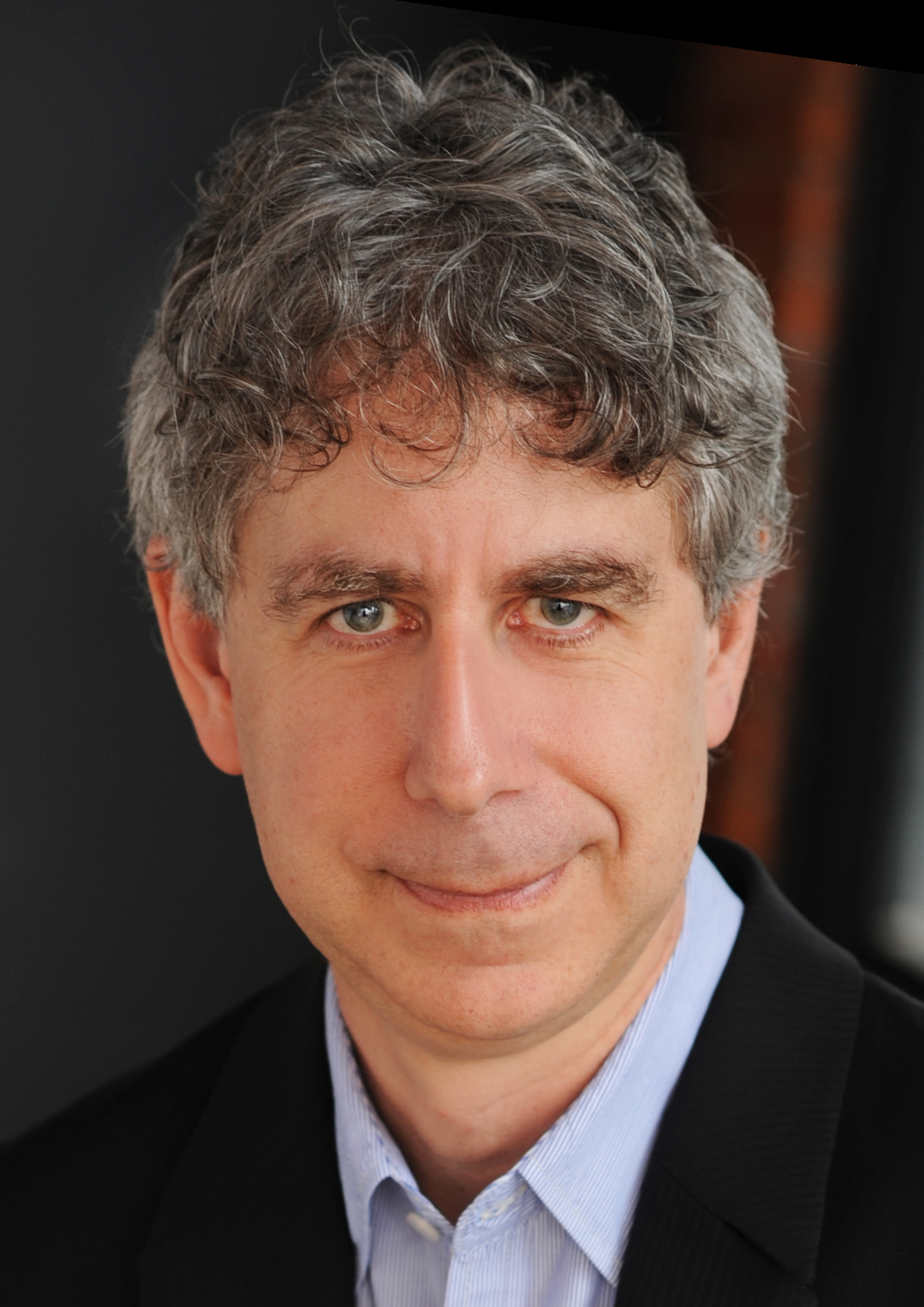
- Bakan in 2011
- Born: Joel Conrad Bakan; 1959 (age 66–67); Lansing, Michigan, U.S.
- Notable credit: The Corporation (2003)
- Spouses: Marlee Gayle Kline (died 2001); Rebecca Jenkins (m. 2004)

Academic background
- Education: Simon Fraser University (BA); University of Oxford (BA); Dalhousie University (LLB); Harvard University (LLM)

Academic work
- Discipline: Law
- Sub-discipline: Constitutional law; economic law; jurisprudence; socio-legal studies
- Institutions: University of British Columbia
- Website: joelbakan.com

Joel Conrad Bakan (born 1959) is an American-Canadian writer, jazz musician, filmmaker, and professor at the Peter A. Allard School of Law at the University of British Columbia.

Born in Lansing, Michigan, and raised for most of his childhood in East Lansing, Michigan, where his parents, Paul and Rita Bakan, were both long-time professors in psychology at Michigan State University. In 1971, he moved with his parents to Vancouver, British Columbia. He was educated at Simon Fraser University (BA, 1981), University of Oxford (BA in law, 1983), Dalhousie University (LLB, 1984) and Harvard University (LLM, 1986).

He served as a law clerk to Chief Justice Brian Dickson in 1985. During his tenure as clerk, Dickson authored the judgment R v Oakes, among others. Bakan then pursued a master's degree at Harvard Law School. After graduation, he returned to Canada, where he has taught law at Osgoode Hall Law School of York University and the University of British Columbia Faculty of Law. He joined the University of British Columbia Faculty of Law in 1990 as an associate professor. Bakan teaches constitutional Law, contracts, socio-legal courses, and the graduate seminar. He has won the Faculty of Law's Teaching Excellence Award twice and a UBC Killam Research Prize.

== Personal life ==
Bakan has a son from his first wife, Marlee Gayle Kline. Kline was a scholar and Professor of Law at the University of British Columbia before dying due to leukemia in 2001. Bakan helped establish the Marlee Kline Memorial Lectures in Social Justice to commemorate her contributions to Canadian law and feminist legal theory. He is now married to Canadian actress and singer Rebecca Jenkins. His brother, Michael Bakan, is an ethnomusicologist.

== Works ==
Bakan authored The Corporation: The Pathological Pursuit of Profit and Power (2003), a book analyzing the evolution and modern-day behavior of corporations from a critical perspective. It was made into a film The Corporation by directors Mark Achbar and Jennifer Abbott the same year and won 25 international awards. His book Childhood Under Siege: How Big Business Ruthlessly Targets Children was published in 2011. Joel Bakan writes in The Corporation:

The law forbids any motivation for their actions, whether to assist workers, improve the environment, or help consumers save money. They can do these things with their own money, as private citizens. As corporate officials, however, stewards of other people's money, they have no legal authority to pursue such goals as ends in themselves – only as means to serve the corporations own interests, which generally means to maximise the wealth of its shareholders. Corporate social responsibility is thus illegal – at least when its genuine.

He is the author of books on Canadian constitutional law, including Just Words: Constitutional Rights and Social Wrongs (1997).

Bakan and his wife Rebecca Jenkins released a jazz album, Blue Skies in 2008, an album of Jenkins' original songs, Something's Coming, in 2012, and Rebecca Jenkins: Live at the Cellar in 2014.

In 2020, he was codirector with Abbott of The New Corporation: The Unfortunately Necessary Sequel, a sequel to the original film version of The Corporation. A follow-up book The New Corporation: How "Good" Corporations Are Bad for Democracy was released in the same year, and was the winner of the Jim Deva Prize for Writing that Provokes from the BC and Yukon Book Prizes in 2021.

=== Bibliography ===
- Just Words: Constitutional Rights and Social Wrongs (1997).
- The Corporation: The Pathological Pursuit of Profit and Power (2003).
- Childhood Under Siege: How Big Business Ruthlessly Targets Children (2011).
- The New Corporation: How "Good" Corporations Are Bad for Democracy (2020, ISBN 9781984899729).

=== Filmography ===
- The Corporation (2003).
- The New Corporation: The Unfortunately Necessary Sequel (2020).
