= Jennifer Abbott =

Canadian director and editor (born 1965)

- Born: 1965 (age 59–60); Montreal, Quebec, Canada
- Occupations: Film director; Cinematographer; Film editor; Documentary filmmaker
- Years active: 1993–

Jennifer Abbott (born 1965) is a Canadian film director, writer, editor, producer and sound designer who specializes in social justice and environmental documentaries.

== Early life, family and education ==
Born in Montreal, Quebec, Abbott has lived in Vancouver and on Galiano Island, British Columbia. She earned a degree in political science from McGill University, with a particular interest in radical political thought and women's studies. She attended law school briefly before instead studying film at Emily Carr University of Art and Design. She left after two years to continue her studies independently; she later taught at the university.

Abbott has twin daughters, who appeared in her film The Magnitude of All Things. Her sister, Saille, died in 2008; Abbott's grief at her death is woven into The Magnitude of All Things.

== Career ==
Abbott has created several documentaries on social justice and environmental issues. Her first documentary, A Cow at My Table (1998), is about the meat industry and animal rights activists. Filming landed her in jail in Saskatchewan after she crawled under a fence onto slaughterhouse property. A Cow at My Table was one of the first feature documentaries to expose and criticize intensive animal agribusiness and won several international awards. In 2000, she was the editor on director Mark Achbar's Two Brides and a Scalpel: Diary of a Lesbian Marriage (2000), a low-budget video diary of the first legally married lesbian couple in Canada. The film received multiple festival invitations and was later broadcast on Canadian television networks.

In 2003, Abbott co-directed with Achbar The Corporation, the film for which she is best known. The documentary critically explores the behavior of modern corporations towards society and the world at large. During the directing/editing process, Abbott went through over 800 pages of interview transcripts and 400 hours of footage. The first "rough cut" was 34 hours that she whittled down into a narrative structure, in both content and emotional arc, over the course of a year. It was important to her that the documentary did not force ideas onto the audience but rather asked questions open to interpretation. During the filming of the documentary, Bakan wrote the book The Corporation: The Pathological Pursuit of Profit and Power.

Abbott became involved with the documentary I Am (2011) after director Tom Shadyac saw The Corporation and invited her to be editor and executive producer. The documentary explores Shadyac's personal journey after a 2007 bicycle accident caused him to develop post-concussion syndrome. Abbott worked remotely on the film from her home.

In 2015, Abbott co-wrote and edited Sea Blind, about the detrimental environmental impacts of the shipping industry and the opening of a sea route in the Arctic due to ice melting as a result of climate change. She also co-wrote, co-directed and edited Us and Them, which features 4 homeless people living with addictions over the course of ten years.

In 2020, Abbott released the feature documentary The Magnitude of All Things, about the emotional and psychological dimensions of the climate crisis which she wrote, directed, co-produced, edited, sound designed and narrated. The film was co-produced by the National Film Board of Canada, Cedar Island Films and Flying Eye Productions. POV magazine called it "as poignant as it is provocative, ... [calling] to mind the lyrical and elegiac wonder of Terrence Malick." Tammy Bannister, Vancouver International Film Festival Programmer, described it as "[p]erhaps the most visceral reasoned call to action for humanity since An Inconvenient Truth". The Magnitude of All Things won the Best Canadian Feature Award at the Planet in Focus Film Festival and premiered internationally in Amsterdam at the IDFA (film festival) featured in the Frontlight program.

In 2020, she also released The New Corporation: The Unfortunately Necessary Sequel (co-directed with Joel Bakan), a follow-up to The Corporation, again co-directed with Mark Achbar. It premiered at the Toronto International Film Festival. A Forbes contributor called it "The Must-See Documentary of the Year".

Abbott first started working in media with Sara Diamond and The Women's Labour History Project. In 2004, Abbott's first experimental short and multimedia work Skinned, about interracial relationships, made with writer David Odhiambo, was exhibited at the Museum of Modern Art in New York. In 2013, she was commissioned by the Netherlands' Submarine Channel to create an experimental short for a multimedia compilation based on a chapter from Steven Poole's book Unspeak, and created the short film Brave New Minds, constructed entirely from footage ripped from the Internet.

Abbott edited the book Making Video 'In': The Contested Ground of Alternative Video on the West Coast, published in 2000.

== Filmography ==
=== Director ===
- Skinned (1993)
- A Cow at My Table (1998)
- The Corporation (2003)
- Unspeak: Brave New Minds (2013)
- Us and Them (2015)
- The New Corporation: The Unfortunately Necessary Sequel (2020)
- The Magnitude of All Things (2020)

=== Writer ===
- Skinned (1993)
- Us and Them (2015)
- Sea Blind (2015)
- The Magnitude of All Things (2020)

=== Editor ===
- Skinned (1993)
- A Cow at My Table (1998)
- Two Brides and a Scalpel: Diary of a Lesbian Marriage (2000)
- The Corporation (2003)
- Let It Ride (2006)
- I Am (2011)
- Unspeak: Brave New Minds (2013)
- Sea Blind (2015)
- Us and Them (2015)
- The Magnitude of All Things (2020)

=== Sound Design ===
- Skinned (1993)
- Unspeak: Brave New Minds (2013)
- Sea Blind (2015)
- The Magnitude of All Things (2020)

=== Producer ===
- A Cow at My Table (1998)
- I Am (2011)
- The Magnitude of All Things (2020)

== Awards and nominations ==
=== A Cow at My Table (1998) ===
- Gold Special Jury Award, WorldFest Houston 1999
- Best Documentary, New Jersey International Film Festival 1999
- Best Documentary, Narrowsburg International Film Festival, New York 1999
- 1st Prize, Video Awards Promoting Respect for All Life, Latham Foundation, California 2000
- Media Commendation Award, Canadian Federation of Humane Societies, 1999
- Silver Certificate, Prix Leonardo International Festival of Film & TV, Italy 1999

=== The Corporation (2003) ===
- Audience Award, World Cinema, Documentary, Sundance Film Festival
- Insight Award for Excellence, National Association of Film and Digital Media Artists, USA
- Best Documentary, The Genie Awards, 2005
- Genesis Award for Outstanding Documentary Film, Humane Society of the United States
- Audience Award for Best Feature Length Film, Ecocinema International Film Festival, Rhodes
- Best Feature Documentary, Environmental Media Association Awards
- Reel Room Audience Award for Best Documentary, Sydney Film Festival
- Joris Ivens Special Jury Award, International Documentary Festival, Amsterdam
- NFB Best Documentary Award, Calgary International Film Festival
- Best Feature Length Documentary, Ecocinema International Film Festival, Rhodes
- Top Ten Films of the Year, Toronto International Film Festival
- Best Documentary Program or Series - History/Biography/Social/Political, Leo Award
- Best Direction in a Documentary Program or Series, Leo Award
- Best Picture Editing in a Documentary Program or Series, Leo Award
- Best Documentary (1st runner-up), Seattle International Film Festival
- Special Jury Mention, Montreal New Film And Video Festival
- Audience Award, Philadelphia International Film Festival
- Audience Award, Vancouver International Film Festival
- Audience Award, Thessaloniki Documentary Film Festival
- Audience Award, FIC Brasilia International Film Festival
- Audience Award (1st runner-up), Calgary International Film Festival
- Audience Award (1st runner-up), Toronto International Film Festival

=== I Am (2011) ===
- Documentary Award - Catholics in Media Associates (CIMA) - 2012

=== Unspeak: Brave New Minds (2013) ===
- Nominee: Prix Europa

=== The New Corporation: The Unfortunately Necessary Sequel (2020) ===
- Nominee: Best Canadian Feature Film, Toronto International Film Festival

=== The Magnitude of All Things (2020) ===
- Best Canadian Documentary, Planet in Focus Film Festival
- Nominee: Best Picture Editing in Documentary, Directors Guild of Canada
